= List of populated places in Kosovo =

The following is a list of populated places in Kosovo, arranged by municipality.

== Deçan / Dečani ==
Name (Albanian)	Name (Serbian)	Coordinates
Baballoq	Babaloć	
Beleg	Beleg	
Belle	Belaje	
Carrabreg i Epërm	Gornji Crnobreg	
Carrabreg i Ulët	Donji Crnobreg	
Dashinoc	Dašinovac	
Deçan	Dečani	
Drenoc	Drenovac	
Dubovik	Dubovik	
Dubravë	Dubrava	
Gjocaj	Ðocaj	
Gllogjan	Glođane	
Gramaçel	Gramočelj	
Hulaj	Huljaj	
Irzniq	Rznić	
Isniq	Istinić	
Jasiq	Jasić	
Junik	Junik	
Kodrali	Kodralija	
Lëbushë	Ljubuša	
Lumbardh	Ljumbarda	
Lloqan	Loćane	
Llukë e Epërme	Gornja Luka	
Llukë e Ulët	Donja Luka	
Maznik	Maznik	
Papiq	Papić	
Pobërgjë	Pobrđe	
Pozhar	Požar	
Prapaqan	Papraćane	
Prekolluk	Prekoluka	
Prilep	Prilep	
Rastavicë	Rastavica	
Ratish i Epërm	Gornji Ratiš	
Ratish i Ulët	Donji Ratiš	
Shaptej	Šaptelj	
Sllup	Slup	
Strellc i Epërm	Gornji Streoc	
Strellc i Ulët	Donji Streoc	
Voksh	Vokša	
Vranoc i Vogël	Mali Vranovac	

== Gjakovë / Ðakovica ==
Name (Albanian)	Name (Serbian)	Coordinates
Babaj i Bokës	Babaj Boks	
Bardhaniq	Bardonić	
Bardhasan	Bardosan	
Batushë	Batuša	
Bec	Bec	
Berjah	Berjak	
Bishtazhin	Bistražin	
Bitesh	Biteš	
Brekoc	Brekovac	
Brovinë	Brovina	
Cërmjan	Crmljane	
Dallashaj	Dalašaj	
Damjan	Damjane	
Devë	Deva	
Doblibarë	Doblibare	
Dobrixhë	Dobrić	
Dobrosh	Dobroš	
Dol	Dolj	
Dujakë	Dujak	
Duzhnjë	Dužnje	
Firajë	Firaja	
Firzë	Firza	
Fshaj	Fšaj	
Gërçinë	Grčina	
Gërgoc	Grgoc	
Gjakova	Ðakovica	
Goden	Goden	
Guskë	Guska	
Hereç	Ereč	
Jabllanicë	Jablanica	
Jahoc	Jahoc	
Janosh	Janoš	
Kodrali	Kodralija	
Korenicë	Korenica	
Koshare	Košare	
Kralan	Kraljane	
Kusar	Kusar	
Kushavec	Kuševac	
Lipovec	Lipovac	
Llugaxhi	Lugadžija	
Madanaj	Madanaj	
Marmull	Marmule	
Mejë	Meja	
Meqe	Meća	
Moglicë	Moglica	
Molliq	Molić	
Morinë	Morina	
Nec	Nec	
Nivokaz	Nivokaz	
Novosellë e Epërme	Gornje Novo Selo	
Novosellë e Poshtme	Donje Novo Selo	
Orize	Orize	
Osek Hilë	Osek Hilja	
Osek Pashë	Osek Paša	
Pacaj	Pacaj	
Palabardhë	Paljabarda	
Pjetërshan	Petrušan	
Plançor	Pljančor	
Ponoshec	Ponoševac	
Popoc	Popovac	
Qerim	Ćerim	
Qerret	Čeret	
Raçë	Rača	
Radoniq	Radonjić	
Rakoc	Rakoc	
Rakovinë	Rakovina	
Ramoc	Ramoc	
Rashkoc	Raškoc	
Rogovë	Rogovo	
Rracaj	Racaj	
Rrezinë	Rezina	
Rrypaj	Ripaj	
Sheremet	Šeremet	
Shishman	Šišman	
Skivjan	Skivjane	
Smaq	Smać	
Smolicë	Smonica	
Sopot	Sopot	
Stubëll	Stubla	
Trakaniq	Trakanić	
Ujz	Ujz	
Vogovë	Vogovo	
Vraniq	Vranić	
Zhabel	Žabelj	
Zhdredhë	Ždrelo	
Zhub	Žub	
Zylfaj	Zulfaj	

== Drenas / Glogovac ==
Name (Albanian)	Name (Serbian)	Coordinates
Abri e Epërme	Gornje Obrinje	
Arllat	Orlate	
Baicë	Banjica	
Çikatovë e Vjetër	Staro Čikatovo	
Çikatovë e Re	Novo Čikatovo	
Dobroshec	Dobroševac	
Domanek	Domanek	
Drenas	Glogovac	
Fushticë e Epërme	Gornja Fuštica	
Fushticë e Poshtme	Donja Fuštica	
Gllanasellë	Gladno Selo	
Gllobar	Globare	
Godanc	Godance	
Gradicë	Gradica	
Kishnarekë	Kišna Reka	
Komoran	Komorane	
Korroticë e Epërme	Gornja Koretica	
Korroticë e Poshtme	Donja Koretica	
Krajkovë	Krajkovo	
Likoshan	Likošane	
Llapushnik	Lapušnik	
Negroc	Negrovce	
Nekoc	Nekovce	
Paklek	Poklek	
Polluzhë	Poluža	
Sankoc	Stankovce	
Shtrubullovë	Štrbulovo	
Shtuticë	Štutica	
Tërdec	Trdevac	
Tërstenik	Trstenik	
Vasilevë	Vasiljevo	
Vërboc	Vrbovac	
Vuçaku	Vučak	
Zabel i Epërm	Gornji Zabelj	
Zabel i Ultë	Donji Zabelj	

== Gjilan / Gnjilane ==
Name (Albanian)	Name (Serbian)	Coordinates
Bilincë	Bilince	
Bresalc	Brasaljce	
Bukovik	Bukovik	
Burincë	Burince	
Capar	Sapar	
Çelik	Čelik	
Cernicë	Cernica	
Demiraj	Demiraj	
Dobërçan	Dobrčane	
Dunav	Dunavo	
Gadish	Gadiš	
Gjilan	Gnjilane	
Goden	Goden	
Gumnishtë	Gumnište	
Haxhaj	Hadžaj	
Inatoc	Inatovce	
Kishnapolë	Kišno Polje	
Kmetoc	Kmetovce	
Kravaricë	Kravarica	
Kurexh	Kuredž	
Lipovicë	Lipovica	
Livoç i Epërm	Gornji Livoč	
Livoç i Ultë	Donji Livoč	
Lladovë	Vladovo	
Llashticë	Vlaštica	
Llovcë	Lovce	
Malishevë	Mališevo	
Muçibabë	Mučibaba	
Nasalë	Nosalje	
Përlepnicë	Prilepnica	
Pidiç	Pidić	
Pogragjë	Podgrađe	
Ponesh	Poneš	
Selishtë	Selište	
Shillovë	Šilovo	
Shurdhan	Šurlane	
Sllakoc i Epërm	Gornje Slakovce	
Sllakoc i Poshtëm	Donje Slakovce	
Sllubicë	Slubica	
Stançiq	Stančić	
Stublilnë	Stublina	
Terzijaj	Terzijaj	
Uglar	Ugljare	
Velekincë	Velekince	
Vërbicë e Zhegocit	Žegovačka Vrbica	
Vërbicë e Kmetovcit	Kmetovačka Vrbica	
Vrapçiq	Vrapčić	
Zhegër	Žegra	
Zhegoc	Žegovac	

== Graçanicë / Gračanica ==
Name (Albanian)	Name (Serbian)	Coordinates
Badoc	Badovac	
Batushë	Batuse	
Çagllavicë	Čaglavica	
Dobratin	Dobrotin	
Graçanicë	Gračanica	
Gushtericë e Epërme	Gornja Gušterica	
Gushtericë e Ulët	Donja Gušterica	
Kishnicë	Kišnica	
Lepi	Lepina	
Livagjë	Livađe	
Llapllasellë	Laplje Selo	
Preoc	Preoce	
Radevë	Radevo	
Skullan	Skulanevo	
Suhadoll	Suvi Do	
Sushicë	Sušica	
Uglar	Ugljare	

== Dragash / Dragaš ==
Name (Albanian)	Name (Serbian)	Coordinates
Baçkë	Bačka	
Bellobrad	Belobrad	
Blaç	Bljač	
Breznë	Brezna	
Brod	Brod	
Brodosanë	Brodosavce	
Brrut	Brut	
Buçe	Buča	
Buzez	Buzec	
Dikancë	Dikance	
Dragash	Dragaš	
Glloboçicë	Globočica	
Kapre	Kapra	
Kërstec	Krstac	
Kosavë	Kosovce	
Krushevë	Kruševo	
Kuk	Kukovce	
Kukjan	Kukuljane	
Kuklibeg	Kuklibeg	
Leshtan	Leštane	
Lubovishtë	Ljubovište	
Mlikë	Mlike	
Orqushë	Orčuša	
Plavë	Plava	
Pllajnik	Plajnik	
Radesh	Radeša	
Rapqë	Rapča	
Restelicë	Restelica	
Rrenc	Rence	
Shajnë	Šajnovce	
Vranishtë	Vranište	
Xërxë	Zrze	
Zaplluxhë	Zaplužje	
Zgatar	Zgatare	
Zlipotok	Zlipotok	
Zym	Zjum	

== Istog / Istok ==
Name (Albanian)	Name (Serbian)	Coordinates
Banjë	Banja	
Banjicë	Banjica	
Belicë	Belica	
Bellopojë	Belo Polje	
Carallukë	Crni Lug	
Cërkolez	Crkolez	
Cerrcë	Crnce	
Dobrushë	Dobruša	
Dragolec	Dragoljevac	
Drejë	Drenje	
Dubovë e Vogël	Malo Dubovo	
Dubravë	Dubrava	
Gjurakoc	Ðurakovac	
Istog	Istok	
Istog i Poshtëm	Donji Istok	
Kaliqan	Kaličane	
Kashicë	Kašica	
Kërrninë	Krnjina	
Kosh	Koš	
Kovragë	Kovrage	
Llugë	Lugovo	
Llukac i Begut	Begov Lukavac	
Llukac i Thatë	Suvi Lukavac	
Lubovë	Ljubovo	
Lubozhdë	Ljubožda	
Mojstir	Mojstir	
Muzhevinë	Muževine	
Orrobërdë	Orno Brdo	
Osojan	Osojane	
Polanë	Poljane	
Prekallë	Prekale	
Prigodë	Prigoda	
Rakosh	Rakoš	
Serbobran	Srbobran	
Shalinovicë	Šaljinovica	
Shushicë	Sušica	
Sinajë	Sinaje	
Staradran	Starodvorane	
Studenicë	Studenica	
Suhogërllë	Suvo Grlo	
Tomoc	Tomance	
Trubuhoc	Trbuhovac	
Tuçep	Tučep	
Uçë	Ukča	
Veriq	Verić	
Veriq i Ri	Novi Verić	
Vrellë	Vrela	
Zabllaq	Zablaće	
Zallq	Žač	
Zhakovë	Žakovo	

== Kaçanik / Kačanik ==
Name (Albanian)	Name (Serbian)	Coordinates
Bajnicë	Banjica	
Begracë	Belograce	
Biqec	Bičevac	
Bob	Bob	
Dimcë	Dimce	
Doganaj	Doganović	
Drenogllavë	Drenoglava	
Dromjak	Drobnjak	
Dubravë	Dubrava	
Duraj	Dura	
Elezaj	Eleza	
Gabricë	Gabrica	
Gajre	Gajre	
Gërlicë e Epërme	Gornja Grlica	
Gjurgjedell	Ðurđev Dol	
Glloboçicë	Globočica	
Gorancë	Gorance	
Han i Elezit	Ðeneral Janković	
Ivajë	Ivaja	
Kaçanik	Kačanik	
Kaçanik i Vjetër	Stari Kačanik	
Korbliq	Korbulić	
Kotlinë	Kotlina	
Kovaçec	Kovačevac	
Krivenik	Krivenik	
Nikaj	Nika	
Paldenicë	Palivodenica	
Pustenik	Pustenik	
Rekë	Reka	
Rezhancë	Režance	
Runjevë	Runjevo	
Seçishtë	Sečište	
Semajë	Semanje	
Sllatinë	Slatina	
Soponicë	Sopotnica	
Stagovë	Stagovo	
Strazhë	Straža	
Vatë	Vata	

== Klinë / Klina ==
Name (Albanian)	Name (Serbian)	Coordinates
Berkovë	Berkovo	
Binxhë	Biča	
Bokshiq	Bokšić	
Budisalc	Budisavci	
Çabiq	Čabić	
Caravik	Cerovik	
Deiq	Deič	
Doberdol	Dobri Dol	
Dollc	Dolac	
Dollovë	Dolovo	
Dranashiq	Drenovčić	
Drenoc	Drenovac	
Dresnik	Drsnik	
Dugajevë	Dugonjive	
Dush	Duš	
Dush i Vogël	Dušević	
Gjurgjevik i Madh	Veliki Ðurđevik	
Gjurgjevik i Vogël	Mali Ðurđevik	
Gllarevë	Iglarevo	
Grabanicë	Grabanica	
Grabc	Grabac	
Gremnik	Grebnik	
Jagodë	Jagoda	
Jashanicë	Jošanica	
Jelloc	Jelovac	
Kërnicë	Krnjince	
Klinafc	Klinavac	
Klinë	Klina	
Kpuz	Kpuz	
Krushevë e Madhe	Veliko Kruševo	
Krushevë e Vogël	Malo Kruševo	
Leskoc	Leskovac	
Nagllavë	Naglavci	
Përqevë	Prčevo	
Pjetërq i Epërm	Gornji Petrič	
Pjetërq i Poshtëm	Donji Petrič	
Pograxhë	Pograđe	
Qeskovë	Českovo	
Qupevë	Čupevo	
Radulloc	Radulovac	
Ranoc	Renovac	
Resnik	Resnik	
Rixhevë	Riđevo	
Rudicë	Rudice	
Sferkë	Svrhe	
Shtupel	Štupelj	
Siqevë	Sićevo	
Stupë	Stup	
Ujmirë	Dobra Voda	
Videjë	Vidanje	
Volljakë	Volujak	
Zabërgjë	Zabrđe	
Zajm	Zajmovo	
Zllakuqan	Zlokućane	

== Fushë Kosovë / Kosovo Polje ==
Name (Albanian)	Name (Serbian)	Coordinates
Bardh i Madh	Veliki Belaćevac	
Bardh i Vogël	Mali Belaćevac	
Bresje	Bresje	
Fushë Kosovë	Kosovo Polje	
Graboc i Poshtëm	Donji Grabovac	
Harilaç	Ariljača	
Henc	Ence	
Kuzmin	Kuzmin	
Lismir	Dobri Dub	
Miradi e Epërme	Gornje Dobrevo	
Miradi e Poshtme	Donje Dobrevo	
Nakaradë	Nakarade	
Pomozotin	Pomazatin	
Sllatinë e Madhe	Velika Slatina	
Sllatinë e Vogël	Mala Slatina	
Vragoli	Vragolija	

== Kamenicë / Kosovska Kamenica ==
Name (Albanian)	Name (Serbian)	Coordinates
Berivojcë	Berivojce	
Bllatë	Blato	
Boscë	Bosce	
Bratilloc	Bratilovce	
Busavatë	Busovata	
Dajkoc	Dajkovce	
Dazhnicë	Daždince	
Desivojcë	Desivojce	
Feriqevë	Firićeja	
Gjyrishec	Ðuriševce	
Gmicë	Gmince	
Gogolloc	Gogolovce	
Gragjenik	Građenik	
Grizimë	Grizime	
Hajnoc	Ajnovce	
Hodonoc	Odanovce	
Hogosht	Ogošte	
Kamenicë	Kosovska Kamenica	
Karaçevë e Epërme	Gornje Karačevo	
Karaçevë e Poshtme	Donje Karačevo	
Kolloleq	Kololeč	
Kopërnicë	Koprivnica	
Koretin	Koretin	
Kostadincë	Kostadince	
Kranidell	Krajnidel	
Kremenatë I	Kremenata I	
Kremenatë II	Kremenata II	
Krilevë	Kriljevo	
Lajçiq	Ljajčić	
Leshtar	Lještar	
Lisockë	Lisacka	
Marocë	Marovce	
Meshinë	Mešina	
Moçar	Močare	
Muçivërc	Mučivrce	
Novosellë	Novo Selo	
Petroc	Petrovce	
Poliçkë	Polička	
Qarakoc	Čarakovce	
Rahovicë	Oraovica	
Rogaçicë	Rogačica	
Ruboc	Robovac	
Sedllar	Sedlare	
Shahiq	Šajić	
Shipashnicë e Epërme	Gornja Šipašnica	
Shipashnicë e Poshtme	Donja Šipašnica	
Strelicë	Strelica	
Strezoc	Strezovce	
Svircë	Svirce	
Tërstenë	Trstena	
Topanicë	Toponica	
Tugjec	Tuđevce	
Vaganesh	Vaganeš	
Velegllavë e Epërme	Gornja Veljeglava	
Velegllavë e Poshtme	Donja Veljeglava	
Vriqec	Vrućevce	
Zajçec	Zajčevce	
Zhujë	Žuja	

== Mitrovicë / Kosovska Mitrovica ==
Name (Albanian)	Name (Serbian)	Coordinates
Bajgorë	Bajgora	
Barë	Bare	
Batahir	Bataire	
Braboniq	Brabonjić	
Dedi	Dedinje	
Gushac	Gušavac	
Kaçandoll	Kačandol	
Kçiq i Madh	Veliki Kičić	
Kçiq i Vogël	Malo Kičiće	
Koprivë	Kopriva	
Koshtovë	Košutovo	
Kovaçicë	Kovačica	
Kutlloc	Kutlovac	
Lisicë	Lisica	
Lushtë	Ljušta	
Magjerë	Mađera	
Mazhiq	Mažić	
Melenicë	Meljenica	
Mitrovicë	Kosovska Mitrovica	
Ovçar	Ovčare	
Pirq	Pirče	
Rahovë	Orahovo	
Rashan	Rašane	
Rekë	Reka	
Rzhanë	Ržana	
Selac	Seljance	
Shipol	Šipolje	
Shupkovc	Šupkovac	
Stantërg	Stari Trg	
Stranë	Strana	
Suhodoll i Epërm	Gornji Suvi Do	
Suhodoll i Poshtëm	Donji Suvi Do	
Svinjarë	Svinjare	
Tërstenë	Trstena	
Tunel i Parë	Prvi Tunel	
Vaganicë	Vaganica	
Vërbnicë	Vrbnica	
Vidishiq	Vidušić	
Vidomiriq	Vidomirić	
Vinarc i Epërm	Gornje Vinarce	
Vinarc i Poshtëm	Donje Vinarce	
Vllahi	Vlahinje	
Zabërxhë	Zabrđe	
Zasellë	Zasela	
Zhabar i Epërm	Gornje Žabare	
Zhabar i Poshtëm	Donje Žabare	
Zijaqë	Zijača	

== Leposaviq / Leposavić ==
Name (Albanian)	Name (Serbian)	Coordinates
Bare	Bare	
Bellobradë	Belo Brdo	
Beluqë	Beluće	
Berberishtë	Berberište	
Bërzancë	Brzance	
Bistricë	Bistrica	
Bistricë e Shalës	Šaljska Bistrica	
Borçan	Borčane	
Borovë	Borova	
Cerajë	Ceranja	
Crnatovë	Crnatovo	
Crven	Crveni	
Desetak	Desetak	
Dobravë	Dobrava	
Dren	Dren	
Dubokë	Duboka	
Gërkajë	Grkaje	
Gnezhdanë	Gnježdane	
Graniçan	Graničane	
Guli	Gulije	
Guvnishtë	Guvnište	
Isevë e Ulët	Donje Isevo	
Jarinje	Jarinje	
Jashanicë	Jošanica	
Jellakcë	Jelakce	
Kajkovë	Kajkovo	
Kamenicë	Kamenica	
Kërnin i Epërm	Gornji Krnjin	
Kërnin i Ulët	Donji Krnjin	
Kijevçiqë	Kijevčiće	
Koporiqë	Koporiće	
Koshuticë	Košutica	
Koshutovë	Košutovo	
Kostinpotok	Kostin Potok	
Krushçicë	Kruščica	
Krushevë	Kruševo	
Kutnje	Kutnje	
Leposaviq	Leposavić	
Leshak	Lešak	
Llazhinë	Lazine	
Lloznë	Lozno	
Majdevë	Majdevo	
Mekiniqe	Mekiniće	
Mihaliq	Mioliće	
Miokoviq	Miokoviće	
Moshnicë	Mošnica	
Ostraqë	Ostraće	
Pllakanicë	Plakaonica	
Pllaninicë	Planinica	
Popoc	Popovce	
Postenjë e Ibrit	Ibarsko Postenje	
Potomlë	Potkomlje	
Pridvoricë	Pridvorica	
Qirkoviq	Ćirkoviće	
Rëvatskë	Rvatska	
Rodel	Rodelj	
Rucmanc	Rucmance	
Seocë	Seoce	
Simiçiste	Simičište	
Sllatinë	Slatina	
Soçanicë	Sočanica	
Trebiqe	Trebiće	
Trikosë	Trikose	
Tvrgjan	Tvrđan	
Ulinje	Ulije	
Vitanoviq	Vitanoviće	
Vraqevë	Vračevo	
Vuçë	Vuča	
Zabërxhë	Zabrđe	
Zavratë	Zavrata	
Zemanicë	Zemanica	
Zërnosek	Zrnosek	

== Lipjan / Lipljan ==
Name (Albanian)	Name (Serbian)	Coordinates
Akllap	Oklap	
Babush i Muhaxherve	Muhadžer Babuš	
Baicë	Banjica	
Banullë	Bandulić	
Breg i Zi	Crni Breg	
Brus	Brus	
Bujan	Bujance	
Bukovicë	Bukovica	
Divlakë	Divljaka	
Dobrajë e Madhe	Velika Dobranja	
Dobrajë e Vogël	Mala Dobranja	
Gadime e Epërme	Gornje Gadimlje	
Gadime e Ulët	Donje Gadimlje	
Gllanicë	Glanica	
Gllavicë	Glavica	
Gllogoc	Glogovce	
Grackë e Vjetër	Staro Gracko	
Grackë e Vogël	Malo Gracko	
Gumnasellë	Guvno Selo	
Hallaç i Madh	Veliki Alaš	
Hallaq i Vogël	Mali Alaš	
Hanroc	Androvac	
Janjevë	Janjevo	
Kleqkë	Klečka	
Kojskë	Konjsko	
Konjuh	Konjuh	
Kraishtë	Krajište	
Krojmir	Krajmirovce	
Leletiq	Laletić	
Lipjan	Lipljan	
Lipovicë	Lipovica	
Llugaxhi	Lugadžija	
Llugë	Lug	
Magurë	Magura	
Marec	Marevce	
Medvec	Medvece	
Mirenë	Mirena	
Okosnicë	Okosnica	
Plitkoviq	Plitković	
Poturoc	Poturovce	
Qellopek	Čelopek	
Qylagë	Čučuljaga	
Resinoc	Rusinovce	
Ribar i Madh	Veliko Ribare	
Ribar I Vogël	Malo Ribare	
Rubofc	Rabovce	
Rufc i Ri	Novo Rujce	
Rufc i Vjetër	Staro Rujce	
Shalë	Sedlare	
Shisharkë	Šišarka	
Sllovi	Slovinje	
Smallushë	Smoluša	
Teqë	Teća	
Tërbuc	Trbovce	
Topliqan	Topličane	
Torinë	Torina	
Varigoc	Varigovce	
Vërshec	Vrševce	
Vogaçicë	Vogačica	
Vrellë	Vrelo	
Vrellë e Goleshit	Goleško Vrelo	
Zllakuqan	Zlokućane	

== Malishevë / Mališevo ==
Name (Albanian)	Name (Serbian)	Coordinates
Astrazup	Ostrozub	
Balincë	Balince	
Banjë	Banja	
Bellanicë	Belanica	
Berishë	Beriša	
Bubavec	Bobovac	
Bubël	Bublje	
Carallukë	Crni Lug	
Carravranë	Crnovrana	
Damanek	Domanek	
Dragobil	Dragobilje	
Gajrak	Gajrak	
Garaqevë	Goračevo	
Golluboc	Golubovac	
Guriq	Gorić	
Janqishtë	Jančište	
Joviq	Jović	
Kërvasari	Kravasarija	
Kijevë	Kijevo	
Lladroc	Ladrovac	
Lladroviq	Ladrović	
Llapçevë	Labučevo	
Llashkadrenoc	Vlaški Drenovac	
Llazicë	Lozica	
Lubizhdë	Ljubižda	
Malishevë	Mališevo	
Marali	Moralija	
Maxharë	Mađare	
Millanoviq	Milanović	
Mirushë	Miruša	
Mleqan	Mlečane	
Ngucat	Guncat	
Pagarushë	Pagaruša	
Panorc	Ponorac	
Pllaqicë	Pločice	
Qypevë	Čupevo	
Rudë	Rude	
Senik	Senik	
Shkarashnik	Skorošnik	
Temeqinë	Tumičina	
Tërpezë	Trpeza	
Tërpezë e Poshtme	Donja Trpeza	
Turjakë	Turjak	
Vërmicë	Vrmnica	

== Novobërdë / Novo Brdo ==
Name (Albanian)	Name (Serbian)	Coordinates
Bolec	Boljevce	
Bostan	Bostane	
Bushincë	Bušince	
Carevc	Carevce	
Dragancë	Draganac	
Izvor	Izvor	
Jasenovik	Jasenovik	
Kllobukar	Klobukar	
Koretishtë	Koretište	
Kosaqë	Kosača	
Kufcë e Epërme	Gornje Kusce	
Llabjan	Labljane	
Makresh i Epërm	Gornji Makreš	
Makresh i Ultë	Donji Makreš	
Manishincë	Manišince	
Miganoc	Miganovce	
Mozgovë	Mozgovo	
Novobërdë	Novo Brdo	
Parallovë	Paralovo	
Pasjak	Pasjak	
Prekoc	Prekovce	
Stanishor	Stanišor	
Strazhë	Straža	
Tërniqec	Trnićevce	
Tirincë	Tirince	
Zebincë	Zebince	

== Obiliq / Obilić ==
Name (Albanian)	Name (Serbian)	Coordinates
Babimoc	Babin Most	
Bakshi	Bakšija	
Breznicë	Breznica	
Caravodicë	Crkvena Vodica	
Dobrosellë	Dobro Selo	
Graboc i Epërm	Gornji Grabovac	
Hade	Ade	
Hamidi	Hamidija	
Kozaricë	Kozarica	
Kryshevc	Kruševac	
Leshkoshiq	Leskovčić	
Llazarevë	Lazarevo	
Mazgit	Mazgit	
Milloshevë	Miloševo	
Minjerë e Kosovës	Rudnik Kosovo	
Obiliq	Obilić	
Plemetin	Plemetina	
Raskovë	Raskovo	
Shipitullë	Šipitula	
Siboc	Sibovac	

== Rahovec / Orahovac ==
Name (Albanian)	Name (Serbian)	Coordinates
Bellacërkë	Bela Crkva	
Bërnjak	Brnjača	
Bratotin	Bratotin	
Brestoc	Brestovac	
Celinë	Celina	
Çifllak	Čiflak	
Dejnë	Danjane	
Dobidol	Dobri Dol	
Drenoc	Drenovac	
Gexhë	Gedža	
Hoçë e Madhe	Velika Hoča	
Hoçë e Vogël	Mala Hoča	
Kaznik	Koznik	
Kramovik	Kramovik	
Krushë e Madhe	Velika Kruša	
Mrasor	Mrasor	
Nagavc	Nogavac	
Nushpal	Našpale	
Opterushë	Opteruša	
Pastasellë	Pusto Selo	
Pataqan i Epërm	Gornje Potočane	
Pataqan i Poshtëm	Donje Potočane	
Petkoviq	Petković	
Polluzhë	Poluža	
Radostë	Radoste	
Rahovec	Orahovac	
Ratkoc	Ratkovac	
Reti e Poshtme	Donje Retimlje	
Retijë	Retimlje	
Sapniq	Sopnić	
Sarosh	Saroš	
Senoc	Sanovac	
Vrajak	Vranjak	
Xërxë	Zrze	
Zatriq	Zatrić	
Zoqishtë	Zočište	

== Partesh / Parteš ==
Name (Albanian)	Name (Serbian)	Coordinates
Budrikë e Poshtme	Donja Budriga	
Partesh	Parteš	
Pasjan	Pasjane	

== Pejë / Peć ==
Name (Albanian)	Name (Serbian)	Coordinates
Babiq	Babiće	
Baran	Barane	
Bellopaq	Belopać	
Bellopojë	Belo Polje	
Bllagajë	Blagaje	
Bogë	Boge	
Breg i Zi	Crni Vrh	
Brestovik	Brestovik	
Brezhanik	Brežanik	
Broliq	Brolić	
Buçan	Bučane	
Çallapek	Čelopek	
Dobërdol	Dobri Do	
Drelaj	Drelje	
Duboçak	Dubočak	
Dubovë	Dubovo	
Dugaivë	Duganjive	
Gllaviçicë	Glavičica	
Gllogjan	Glođane	
Gorazhdec	Goraždevac	
Graboc	Grabovac	
Haxhaj	Hadžovići	
Jabllanicë	Jablanica	
Jabllanicë e Madhe	Velika Jablanica	
Jabllanicë e Vogël	Mala Jablanica	
Kërstoc	Krstovac	
Kliçinë	Klinčina	
Koshutan	Košutane	
Kosuriq	Kosurić	
Kotradiq	Kotradić	
Kryshec	Kruševac	
Kuqishtë	Kućište	
Leshan	Lješane	
Lëvoshë	Ljevoša	
Lipë	Lipa	
Llabjan	Labljane	
Llaz-Bellopaq	Laz Belopać	
Llozhan	Ložane	
Llugagji	Lugađija	
Loxhë	Lođa	
Lubeniq	Ljubenić	
Lutogllavë	Ljutoglava	
Malaj	Maljeviće	
Millovanc	Milovanac	
Nabërgjan	Nabrđe	
Nakëll	Naklo	
Nepolë	Nepolje	
Novosellë	Novo Selo	
Osojë	Osoje	
Ozdrim	Ozrim	
Pavlan	Plavljane	
Pejë	Peć	
Pepiq	Pepiće	
Pishtan	Pištane	
Poçestë	Počešće	
Qyshk	Ćuška	
Radac	Radavac	
Ramun	Romune	
Rashiq	Rašić	
Raushiq	Raušić	
Rekë e Allagës	Alagina Reka	
Rosulë	Rosulje	
Ruhot	Ruhot	
Shkrel	Škrelje	
Shtupeq i Madh	Veliki Štupelj	
Shtupeq i Vogël	Mali Štupelj	
Sigë	Siga	
Stankaj	Jošanica	
Sverkë	Svrke	
Treboviq	Trebović	
Trestenik	Trstenik	
Turjakë	Turjak	
Vitomiricë	Vitomirica	
Vragoc	Vragovac	
Vranoc	Vranovac	
Zagërmë	Zagrmlje	
Zahaq	Zahać	
Zllapek	Zlopek	

== Podujevë / Podujevo ==
Name (Albanian)	Name (Serbian)	Coordinates
Bajçinë	Bajčina	
Balloc	Balovac	
Barainë	Baraina	
Batllavë	Batlava	
Bellopojë	Belo Polje	
Bërvenik	Brevnik	
Bllatë	Blato	
Bradash	Bradaš	
Brainë	Braina	
Brecë	Brece	
Buricë	Burince	
Dobërdol	Dobri Do	
Dobratin	Dobrotin	
Dumnicë e Epërme	Gornja Dubnica	
Dumnicë e Poshtme	Donja Dubnica	
Dumosh	Dumoš	
Dvorishtë	Dvorište	
Dyz	Duz	
Gërdoc	Grdovac	
Gllamnik	Glavnik	
Godishnjak	Godišnjak	
Halabak	Alabak	
Herticë	Hrtica	
Kaçybeg	Kačibeg	
Kalaticë	Kaljatica	
Kërpimeh	Krpimej	
Kunushec	Konjuševac	
Kushevicë	Kruševica	
Letanc	Letance	
Livadicë	Livadica	
Lladoc	Ladovac	
Llapashticë e Epërme	Gornja Lapaštica	
Llapashticë e Poshtme	Donja Lapaštica	
Llaushë	Lauša	
Llugë	Lug	
Lluzhan	Lužane	
Lupç i Epërm	Gornje Ljupče	
Lupç i Poshtëm	Donje Ljupče	
Majac	Majance	
Merdar	Merdare	
Metehi	Metohija	
Metergoc	Medregovac	
Miroc	Mirovac	
Muhazob	Mazap	
Murgull	Murgula	
Obrançë	Obrandža	
Orllan	Orlane	
Pakashticë e Epërme	Gornja Pakaštica	
Pakashticë e Poshtme	Donja Pakaštica	
Penuhë	Penduha	
Peran	Perane	
Përpellac	Prepolac	
Podujevë	Podujevo	
Pollatë	Palatna	
Popovë	Popovo	
Potok	Potok	
Rakinicë	Rakinica	
Reçicë	Rečica	
Repë	Repa	
Revuq	Revuće	
Sallabajë	Kisela Banja	
Sfeqël	Svetlje	
Shajkoc	Šajkovac	
Shakovicë	Šakovica	
Shtedim	Štedim	
Siboc i Epërm	Gornji Sibovac	
Siboc i Poshtëm	Donji Sibovac	
Sllatinë	Slatina	
Surdull	Surdula	
Surkish	Surkiš	
Sylevicë	Siljevica	
Tërrnavë	Trnava	
Tërrnavicë	Trnavica	
Turuçicë	Turučica	
Velikarekë	Velika Reka	
Zakut	Zakut	
Zhiti	Žitinje	

== Prishtinë / Priština ==
Name (Albanian)	Name (Serbian)	Coordinates
Ballaban	Balaban	
Barilevë	Bariljevo	
Bërnicë e Epërme	Gornja Brnjica	
Bërnicë e Poshtme	Donja Brnjica	
Besi	Besinje	
Busi	Businje	
Dabishec	Dabiševac	
Dragoc	Dragovac	
Drenoc	Drenovac	
Gllogovicë	Glogovica	
Grashticë	Graštica	
Hajkobillë	Ajkobila	
Hajvali	Ajvalija	
Keqekollë	Kačikol	
Koliq	Kolić	
Kolovicë	Kojlovica	
Kukavicë	Kukavica	
Lebanë	Lebane	
Llukar	Lukare	
Makoc	Makovac	
Marec	Marevce	
Matiçan	Matičane	
Mramor	Mramor	
Nëntë Jugoviq	Devet Jugovića	
Nishec	Niševce	
Orlloviq	Orlović	
Prapashticë	Propaštica	
Prishtinë	Priština	
Prugoc	Prugovac	
Radashec	Radoševac	
Rimanishtë	Rimanište	
Sharban	Šarban	
Shashkoc	Šaškovac	
Sinidol	Sinji Dol	
Siqevë	Sićevo	
Slivovë	Slivovo	
Sofali	Sofalija	
Teneshdoll	Teneš Do	
Trudë	Trudna	
Vranidoll	Vrani Do	
Zllash	Zlaš	
Zllatar	Zlatare	

== Prizren ==
Name (Albanian)	Name (Serbian)	Coordinates
Atmagjë	Atmađa	
Billushë	Biluša	
Caparc	Caparce	
Dedaj	Dedaj	
Dobrushtë	Dobrušte	
Dojnicë	Dojnice	
Drajçiq	Drajčići	
Dushanovë	Dušanovo	
Gërnçar	Grnčare	
Gjonaj	Ðonaj	
Gornjasellë	Gornje Selo	
Gorozhup	Gorožup	
Grazhdanik	Graždanik	
Hoçë e Qytetit	Hoča Zagradska	
Jabllanicë	Jablanica	
Jeshkovë	Ješkovo	
Kabash	Kabaš	
Kabash i Hasit	Kabaš Has	
Karashëngjergj	Karašinđerđ	
Kobajë	Kobanja	
Kojushë	Kojuš	
Korishë	Koriša	
Krajk	Krajk	
Krushë e Vogël	Mala Kruša	
Kushnin	Kušnin	
Kushtendil	Kuštendil	
Landovicë	Landovica	
Leskovec	Leskovac	
Lez	Lez	
Llokvicë	Lokvica	
Lubinjë e Epërme	Gornje Ljubinje	
Lubinjë e Poshtme	Donje Ljubinje	
Lubiqevë	Ljubičevo	
Lubizhdë	Ljubižda	
Lubizhdë e Hasit	Ljubižda Has	
Lukinaj	Ljukinaj	
Lutogllavë	Ljutoglav	
Malësi e Re	Nova Šumadija	
Mamushë	Mamuša	
Manastiricë	Manastirica	
Mazrek	Mazrek	
Medvec	Medvece	
Milaj	Miljaj	
Muradem	Muradem	
Mushnikovë	Mušnikovo	
Nashec	Našec	
Nebregoshtë	Nebregošte	
Novak	Novake	
Novosellë	Novo Selo	
Petrovë	Petrovo Selo	
Piranë	Pirane	
Pllanejë	Planeja	
Pllanjan	Planjane	
Poslishtë	Poslište	
Pouskë	Pousko	
Prizren	Prizren	
Randobravë	Randubrava	
Reçan	Rečane	
Romajë	Romaja	
Sërbicë e Epërme	Gornja Srbica	
Sërbicë e Poshtme	Donja Srbica	
Shkozë	Škoza	
Shpenadi	Špinadija	
Skorobishtë	Skorobište	
Smaç	Smać	
Sredskë	Sredska	
Struzhë	Stružje	
Trepetincë	Trepetnica	
Tupec	Tupec	
Velezhë	Veleža	
Vërbiqan	Vrbičane	
Vërmicë	Vrbnica	
Vlashnjë	Vlašnja	
Zhivinjan	Živinjane	
Zhur	Žur	
Zojz	Zojić	
Zym	Zjum	

== Ranillug / Ranilug ==
Name (Albanian)	Name (Serbian)	Coordinates
Bozhec	Boževce	
Domoroc	Domorovce	
Drenoc	Drenovce	
Gllogoc	Glogovce	
Hodec	Odevce	
Kormnjan i Epërm	Gornje Korminjane	
Kormnjan i Poshtëm	Donje Korminjane	
Pançellë	Pančelo	
Rajanoc	Rajanovce	
Ranillug	Ranilug	
Ropotovë e Madhe	Veliko Ropotovo	
Ropotovë e Vogël	Malo Ropotovo	
Tomanc	Tomance	

== Skënderaj / Srbica ==
Name (Albanian)	Name (Serbian)	Coordinates
Abri e Poshtme	Donje Obrinje	
Aqarevë	Ovčarevo	
Bajë	Banja	
Baks	Baks	
Burojë	Broćna	
Çirez	Ćirez	
Çitak	Čitak	
Çubrel	Čubrelj	
Dashec	Doševac	
Izbicë	Izbica	
Klinë e Poshtme	Donja Klina	
Klinë e Epërme	Gornja Klina	
Klinë e Mesme	Srednja Klina	
Klladërnicë	Kladernica	
Kopiliq i Epërm	Gornji Obilić	
Kopiliq i Poshtëm	Donji Obilić	
Kostërc	Kostrc	
Kotorr	Kotore	
Kozhicë	Kožica	
Krasaliq	Krasalić	
Krasmiroc	Krasmirovac	
Kryshec	Kruševac	
Kuçicë	Kućica	
Leçinë	Leočina	
Likoc	Likovac	
Llaushë	Lauša	
Lubavec	Ljubovac	
Makërmal	Makrmalj	
Marinë	Marina	
Mikushnicë	Mikušnica	
Murgë	Murga	
Pemishtë	Padalište	
Plluzhinë	Plužina	
Polac	Poljance	
Prekaz i Epërm	Gornje Prekaze	
Prekaz i Poshtëm	Donje Prekaze	
Prelloc	Prelovac	
Radishevë	Radiševo	
Rakinicë	Rakitnica	
Rezallë	Rezala	
Runik	Rudnik	
Skënderaj	Srbica	
Syriganë	Suvo Grlo	
Tërnac	Trnavce	
Ticë	Tica	
Turiqec	Turićevac	
Tushilë	Tušilje	
Vajnikë	Voćnjak	
Vitak	Vitak	

== Shtime / Štimlje ==
Name (Albanian)	Name (Serbian)	Coordinates
Belincë	Belince	
Carralevë	Crnoljevo	
Davidoc	Davidovce	
Devetak	Devetak	
Dugë	Duga	
Gjurkoc	Ðurkovce	
Gllavicë	Glavica	
Godanc i Epërm	Gornje Godance	
Godanc i Poshtëm	Donje Godance	
Karaqicë	Karačica	
Llanishtë	Lanište	
Mollopolc	Malopoljce	
Muzeqinë	Mužičane	
Petrovë	Petrovo	
Petroviq	Petrović	
Pjetërshticë	Petraštica	
Raçak	Račak	
Rancë	Rance	
Rashincë	Rašince	
Shtime	Štimlje	
Topillë	Topilo	
Vojnoc	Vojinovce	
Zborc	Zborce	

== Shtërpcë / Štrpce ==
Name (Albanian)	Name (Serbian)	Coordinates
Beroc	Berevce	
Biti e Epërme	Gornja Bitinja	
Biti e Poshtme	Donja Bitinja	
Brezovicë	Brezovica	
Brod	Brod	
Drekoc	Drajkovce	
Firajë	Firaja	
Gotovushë	Gotovuša	
Izhancë	Ižance	
Jazhincë	Jažince	
Kashtanevë	Koštanjevo	
Sevcë	Sevce	
Shtërpcë	Štrpce	
Sushicë	Sušiće	
Vërbeshticë	Vrbeštica	
Viqë	Viča	

== Suharekë / Suva Reka ==
Name (Albanian)	Name (Serbian)	Coordinates
Bllacë	Blace	
Budakovë	Budakovo	
Bukosh	Bukoš	
Çadrak	Čajdrak	
Delloc	Delovce	
Dobërdelan	Dobrodeljane	
Dubravë	Dubrava	
Duhël	Dulje	
Dvoran	Dvorane	
Gelancë	Geljance	
Gjinoc	Ðinovce	
Greiçec	Grejčevce	
Greikoc	Grejkovce	
Javor	Javor	
Kastërc	Kostrce	
Krushicë e Epërme	Gornja Krušica	
Krushicë e Poshtme	Donja Krušica	
Leshan	Lešane	
Luzhnicë	Lužnica	
Maçitevë	Mačitevo	
Mohlan	Movljane	
Mushtisht	Mušutište	
Nepërbisht	Neprebište	
Nishor	Nišor	
Papaz	Papaz	
Peçan	Pećane	
Popolan	Popovljane	
Reçan	Rečane	
Reshtan	Raštane	
Sallagrazhdë	Selogražde	
Samadrexhë	Samodraža	
Savrovë	Savrovo	
Semetisht	Semetište	
Sllapuzhan	Slapužane	
Sopijë	Sopina	
Staravuçinë	Stara Vučina	
Studençan	Studenčane	
Suharekë	Suva Reka	
Tërrnje	Trnje	
Vërshec	Vrševce	
Vraniq	Vranić	

== Ferizaj / Uroševac ==
Name (Albanian)	Name (Serbian)	Coordinates
Bablak	Babljak	
Babush i Serbëve	Srpski Babuš	
Balaj	Balić	
Bibaj	Biba	
Burrnik	Burnik	
Cërnillë	Crnilo	
Doganaj	Doganjevo	
Dramjak	Dramnjak	
Ferizaj	Uroševac	
Fshat i Vjetër	Staro Selo	
Gaçkë	Gatnje	
Gërlicë	Grlica	
Gremë	Grebno	
Jezerc	Jezerce	
Komogllavë	Kamena Glava	
Koshare	Košare	
Kosinë	Kosin	
Lloshkobare	Laškobare	
Manastirc	Manastirce	
Mirash	Miraš	
Mirosalë	Mirosavlje	
Muhoc	Muhovce	
Nekodim	Nekodim	
Nerodimë e Poshtme	Donje Nerodimlje	
Nerodimë e Epërme	Gornje Nerodimlje	
Papaz	Papaz	
Pleshinë	Plešina	
Pojatë	Pojatište	
Prelez i Jerlive	Jerli Prelez	
Prelez i Muhaxherëve	Muhadžer Prelez	
Rahovicë	Rahovica	
Rakaj	Raka	
Sazli	Sazlija	
Slivovë	Slivovo	
Softaj	Softović	
Sojevë	Sojevo	
Surqinë	Svrčina	
Talinoc i Jerlive	Jerli Talinovac	
Talinoc i Muhaxherëve	Muhadžer Talinovac	
Dardani	Tankosić	
Tërrn	Trn	
Varosh	Varoš Selo	
Zaskok	Zaskok	
Zllatar	Zlatare	

== Viti / Vitina ==
Name (Albanian)	Name (Serbian)	Coordinates
Ballancë	Balance	
Beguncë	Begunce	
Binça	Binač	
Budrikë e Epërme	Gornja Budrika	
Buzovik	Buzovik	
Çifllak	Čiflak	
Debelldeh	Debelde	
Devajë	Devaja	
Drobesh	Drobeš	
Gërmovë	Grmovo	
Gërnçar	Grnčar	
Gjylekar	Ðelekare	
Goden i Madh	Veliki Goden	
Gushicë	Gušica	
Kabash	Kabaš	
Kllokot	Klokot	
Letnicë	Letnica	
Lubishtë	Ljubište	
Mjak	Mijak	
Mogillë	Mogila	
Podgorc	Podgorce	
Pozharan	Požaranje	
Radivojc	Radivojce	
Ramjan	Donje Ramnjane	
Ramnishtë	Ravnište	
Remnik	Ribnik	
Sadovinë e Çerkezve	Čerkez Sadovina	
Sadovinë e Jerlive	Jerli Sadovina	
Shashar	Šašare	
Sllatinë e Epërme	Gornja Slatina	
Sllatinë e Poshtme	Donja Slatina	
Smirë	Smira	
Stubëll e Epërme	Gornja Stubla	
Stubëll e Poshtme	Donja Stubla	
Tërpezë	Trpeza	
Tërstenik	Trstenik	
Vërban	Vrban	
Vërboc	Vrbovac	
Vërnakollë	Vrnavokolo	
Vërnez	Vrnez	
Viti	Vitina	
Zhiti	Žitinje	

== Vushtrri / Vučitrn ==
Name (Albanian)	Name (Serbian)	Coordinates
Akrashticë	Okraštica	
Balincë	Balince	
Banjskë	Banjska	
Beçiq	Bečić	
Beçuk	Benčuk	
Begaj	Novo Selo Begovo	
Bivolak	Bivoljak	
Boshlan	Bošljane	
Brusnik	Brusnik	
Bukosh	Bukoš	
Ceceli	Cecelija	
Dalak	Doljak	
Dobërllukë	Dobra Luka	
Druar	Drvare	
Duboc	Dubovac	
Dumnicë e Epërme	Gornja Dubnica	
Dumnicë e Llugës	Lug Dubnica	
Dumnicë e Poshtme	Donja Dubnica	
Galicë	Galica	
Gllavatin	Glavotina	
Gojbulë	Gojbulja	
Gracë	Grace	
Gumnishtë	Gumnište	
Hercegovë	Hercegovo	
Karaçë	Karače	
Kollë	Kolo	
Kunovik	Kunovik	
Kurillovë	Kurilovo	
Liqej	Jezero	
Lumadh	Velika Reka	
Mavriq	Mavrić	
Maxhunaj	Novo Selo Mađunsko	
Mihaliq	Mijalić	
Miraçë	Miroče	
Nedakoc	Nedakovac	
Novolan	Nevoljane	
Oshlan	Ošljane	
Pantinë	Pantina	
Pasomë	Pasoma	
Pestovë	Pestovo	
Prelluzhë	Prilužje	
Reznik	Resnik	
Ropicë	Ropica	
Samadrexhë	Samodreža	
Sfaraçak i Epërm	Gornji Svračak	
Sfaraçak i Poshtëm	Donji Svračak	
Shalë	Šalce	
Shlivovicë	Šljivovica	
Shtitaricë	Štitarica	
Skoçan	Skočna	
Skromë	Skrovna	
Sllakoc	Slakovce	
Sllatinë	Slatina	
Smrekonicë	Smrekovnica	
Stanoc i Epërm	Gornje Stanovce	
Stanoc i Poshtëm	Donje Stanovce	
Stroc	Strovce	
Studime e Epërme	Gornja Sudimlja	
Studime e Poshtme	Donja Sudimlja	
Taraxhë	Taradža	
Tërllobuq	Trlabuć	
Vërnicë	Vrnica	
Vesekoc	Vesekovce	
Vilanc	Viljance	
Vushtrri	Vučitrn	
Zagorë	Zagorje	
Zhilivodë	Žilivoda	

== Zubin Potok ==
Name (Albanian)	Name (Serbian)	Coordinates
Babiq	Babiće	
Babudovicë	Babudovica	
Bajnoviqe	Bojnoviće	
Banjë	Banja	
Bërnjak	Brnjak	
Breg i Madh	Velji Breg	
Bube	Bube	
Burllatë	Burlate	
Çabër	Čabra	
Çeqevë	Čečevo	
Çeshanoviq	Češanoviće	
Çitlluk	Čitluk	
Crepulë	Crepulja	
Dobroshevinë	Dobroševina	
Dragalicë	Dragalica	
Drainoviq	Drainoviće	
Dren	Dren	
Gazivodë	Gazivode	
Jabukë	Jabuka	
Jagnjenicë	Jagnjenica	
Jasenovik i Epërm	Gornji Jasenovik	
Jasenovik i Poshtëm	Donji Jasenovik	
Junakë	Junake	
Kalludër e Madhe	Velika Kaludra	
Kalludër e Vogël	Mala Kaludra	
Kërligatë	Krligate	
Kijec	Kijevce	
Kleçkë	Klečke	
Kobillogllavë	Kobilja Glava	
Kopiloviq	Kopiloviće	
Kovaçë	Kovače	
Kozarevë	Kozarevo	
Lluçkarekë	Lučka Reka	
Megjipotok	Međeđi Potok	
Okllac	Oklace	
Padinë	Padine	
Paruc	Paruci	
Prelez	Prelez	
Presekë	Preseka	
Prevlak	Prevlak	
Pridvoricë	Pridvorica	
Rançiq	Rančiće	
Rezallë	Rezala	
Rujishtë	Rujište	
Shipovë	Šipovo	
Shtuoc	Štuoce	
Stërnac i Epërm	Gornji Strmac	
Tushiqë	Tušiće	
Uglar	Ugljare	
Varragë e Epërme	Gornje Varage	
Varragë e Poshtme	Donje Varage	
Vërbë	Vrba	
Vitakovë	Vitakovo	
Vojmisliq	Vojmisliće	
Vukojeviq	Vukojeviće	
Zagragjë	Zagrađe	
Zagul	Zagulje	
Zeqeviç	Zečeviće	
Zharevë	Žarevi	
Zubin Potoku	Zubin Potok	
Zupç	Zupče	

== Zveçan / Zvečan ==
Name (Albanian)	Name (Serbian)	Coordinates
Banjskë	Banjska	
Banovdoll	Banov Do	
Boletin	Boljetin	
Bresnicë	Bresnica	
Dolan	Doljane	
Graboc	Grabovac	
Grizhan	Grižani	
Izvor	Izvori	
Joshevik	Joševik	
Kamenicë	Kamenica	
Korilë	Korilje	
Kullë	Kula	
Lipë	Lipa	
Lipovicë	Lipovica	
Llokvë	Lokva	
Llovac	Lovac	
Llozishtë	Lozište	
Maticë	Matica	
Mekidoll	Meki Do	
Potok i Jankut	Jankov Potok	
Rahovicë	Oraovica	
Rekë e Banjskës	Banjska Reka	
Rudar i Madh	Veliko Rudare	
Rudar i Vogël	Malo Rudare	
Rudinë	Rudine	
Sendojë	Sendo	
Sërboc	Srbovac	
Suhadoll i Banjës	Banjski Suvi Do	
Vallaq	Valač	
Vilishtë	Vilište	
Zhazhë	Žaža	
Zherovnicë	Žerovnica	
Zhitkoc	Žitkovac	
Zveçan	Zvečan	
Zveçan i Vogël	Mali Zvečan	

== See also ==
- Administrative divisions of Kosovo
- Districts of Kosovo
- Municipalities of Kosovo
- List of cities in Kosovo
