= Pirče =

Pirče may refer to the following places:

In Kosovo:

- Pirče, Mitrovica, a settlement in the Municipality of Mitrovica

In Slovenia:

- Pirče, Kostel, a settlement in the Municipality of Kostel

== See also ==
- Poljana
