= Koretište =

Koretište Koretishtë
- Village
- Location in Kosovo
- Coordinates: 42°29′18″N 21°26′30″E
- Location: Kosovo
- District: Gjilan
- Municipality: Gjilan

Population (2024)
  - Total: 321
- Time zone: UTC+1 (CET)

Koretište (Serbian Cyrillic: Коретиште; erroneously Kuretište, Serbian Cyrillic: Куретиште) or Koretishtë/Koretisht (Albanian definite form: Koretishta/Koretishti), is a village in the municipality of Gjilan in Kosovo. It is inhabited by majority of ethnic Serbs.

== History ==
The village was mentioned as Karanište (Serbian Cyrillic: Караниште) in the Ottoman defter of 1455 of the Vlk Vilayet (Vilayet of Vuk), encompassing most of Vuk Branković's former territory. At that time the village was populated with a priest and 14 households.

On the Austrian map from 1689, it is registered under the name Koretište (Serbian Cyrillic: Коретиште).

== See also ==
- Populated places in Kosovo
