= Brus =

Brus may refer to:

== Places ==
- Brus, Serbia, a town and municipality
- Brus, Świętokrzyskie Voivodeship, a village in south-central Poland

== People ==
- Brus (surname), a list of people with the name Brus or de Brus
- Brus family, a medieval Scottish clan best known as Bruce

== Card games ==
- Brus (card game), a Danish card game
- Brús, an Icelandic card game

== Other uses ==
- Brös or brus, a fermented preparation of cheese and grappa from Piedmont
- Braenne brus, a green soda with pear taste, a product of Brænne Mineralvatn
- The Brus, a 1370s Scots narrative poem by John Barbour

== See also ==
- Brus equation, an equation in quantum electronics and nanotechnology
- Bräus
- Bruus, a North German card game, ancestral to the above
- Bros (disambiguation)
- Bru (disambiguation)
- Bruce (disambiguation)
- Bruise
- Brush (disambiguation)
- Brussels (disambiguation)
- Bruus
