= Zlatare =

Zlatare Златаре
- Village (Selo)
- Location within Serbia
- Coordinates: 43°5′N 20°37′E
- Country: Serbia
- District: Raška District
- Municipality: Novi Pazar

Area
  - Total: 3.10 km^{2} (1.20 sq mi)
- Elevation: 1,168 m (3,832 ft)

Population (2011)
  - Total: 9
  - Density: 2.9/km^{2} (7.5/sq mi)
- Time zone: UTC+1 (CET)
  - Summer (DST): UTC+2 (CEST)

Zlatare (Serbian Cyrillic: Златаре) is a village located in the municipality of Novi Pazar, Serbia.
