= Dedia, Kosovo =

Dedia Dedi
- Village
- Location in Kosovo
- Coordinates: 42°59′33″N 20°54′12″E
- Location: Kosovo
- District: Mitrovicë
- Municipality: Mitrovicë

Population (2024)
  - Total: 0
- Time zone: UTC+1 (CET)
  - Summer (DST): UTC+2 (CEST)

Dedia (Albanian: Dedaj; Serbian; Dedinje) is a village in the municipality of Mitrovica in the District of Mitrovica, northern Kosovo. It is uninhabited according to the 2011 census.
