= Dubovë e vogël =

Coordinates: 42.7236°N 20.3597°E

Dubovë e vogël (Albanian, determinate form: Dubova e Vogël), Malo Dubovo (Serbian), is a village of Istog/Istok municipality, in Western Kosovo. The village has an area of 243,23 ha.

The toponym is of Slavic origin, from the word dub that means oak.

== Population ==
Between the two world wars, seven families of Serbian and Montenegrin as well as a Bosniaks settled in the village.

At the census of 1921, the village had a population of 121 inhabitants, at the one of 1948 it had 160 inhabitants, and 346 inhabitants in 1981 (among them: 310 Albanians, or 89,5% of the total population; 30 Montenegrins, or 8,67% of the total population; 6 Bosniaks, or 1,73% of the total population).

The families currently inhabiting the village are:

- Bacaj (Albanian)
- Daci (Albanian)
- Demaj (Albanian)
- Hasaj (Albanian)
- Kelmendi (Albanian)
- Lajci (Albanian)
- Mahaj (Albanian)
- Sallka (Albanian with Bosniaks origins)

== Kosovo War ==
During the Kosovo War the Albanian and Bosniaks population of the village had to leave and took refuge in Montenegro; a part then left for Albania.

Serbian families left the village before the return of Albanian refugees in 1999.

In 1999, during the Kosovo war, five people were killed in the village:

- Kelmendi Atifete, civilian
- Kelmendi Ismet, civilian
- Kelmendi Ramiz, civilian
- Kelmendi Xhevdet, civilian
- Vasovic Milisav, soldier
- Demaj Hajrije, civilian (inhabitant of Dubovë e Vogël/Malo Dubovo, she was massacred in the village of Kaliqan/Kaličane during her escape on 13 April 1999)
