= Batahir =

Batahir Bataire
- Village
- Location in Kosovo
- Coordinates: 43°00′00.4″N 20°52′59.8″E
- Location: Kosovo
- District: Mitrovicë
- Municipality: Mitrovicë

Population (2024)
  - Total: 0
- Time zone: UTC+1 (CET)

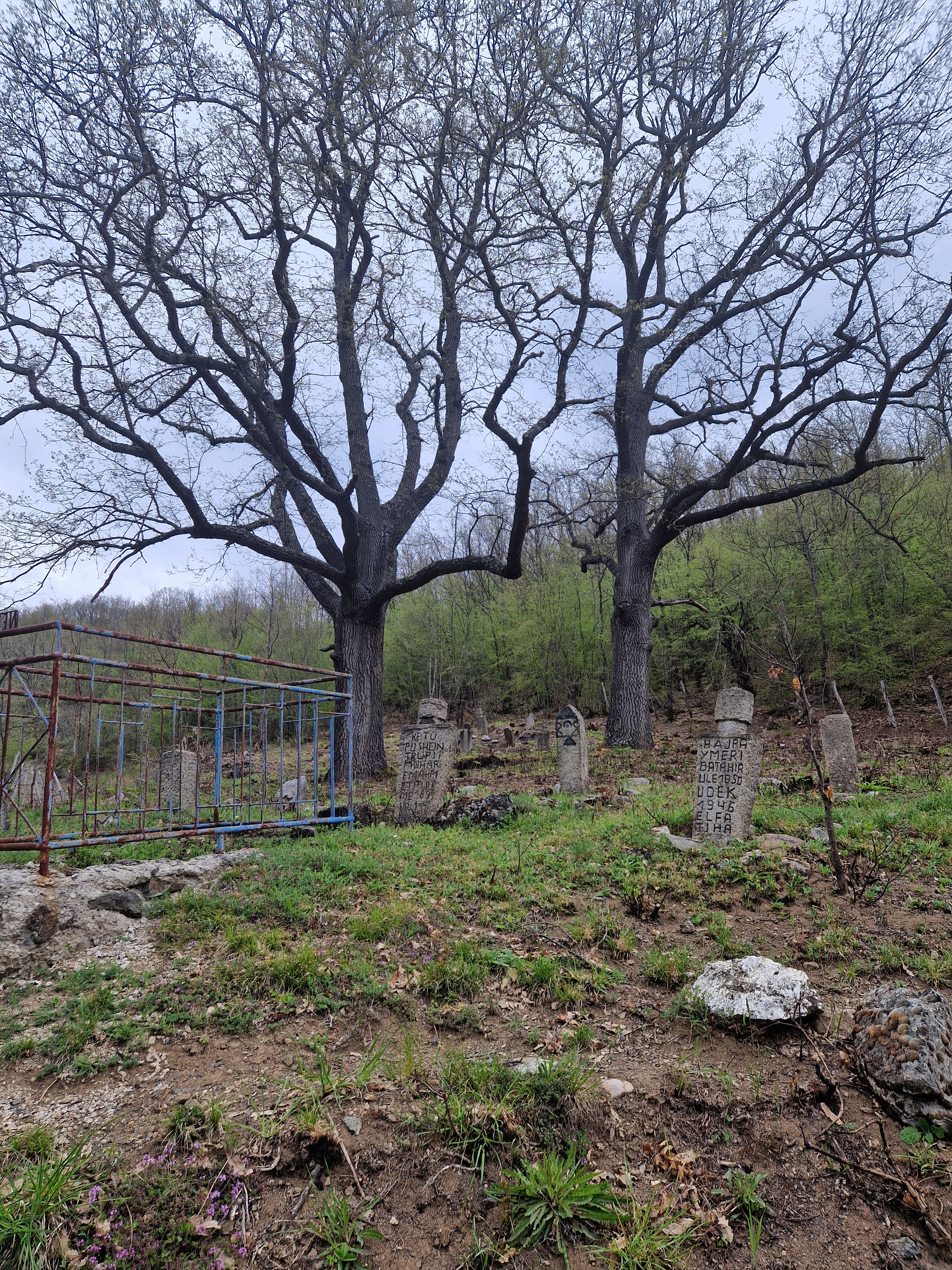
A graveyard in Batahir

Batahir (Serbian: Батаире, romanized: Bataire) is a village in the municipality of Mitrovica in the District of Mitrovica, Kosovo. According to the 2011 census, it didn't have any inhabitants.
