= Kotorr, Kosovo =

Kotorr Kotorr Kosovë
- Village
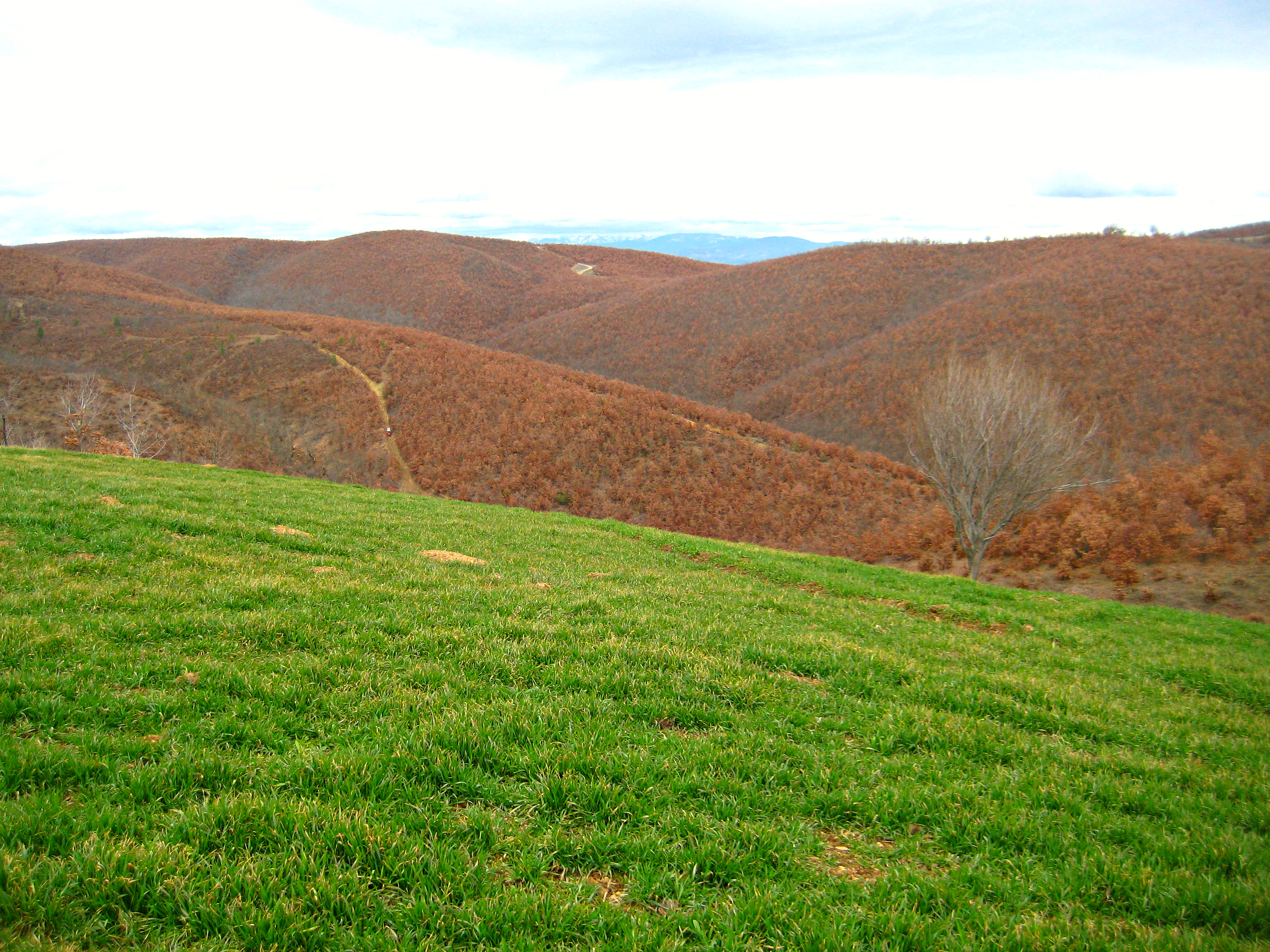

- Location in Kosovo
- Coordinates: 42°48′04″N 20°44′35″E
- Location: Kosovo
- District: Mitrovicë
- Municipality: Skënderaj

Population (2024)
  - Total: 119
- Time zone: UTC+1 (CET)

Kotorr (in Albanian) is a village in Kosovo located in the town-municipality of Skenderaj and in the District of Mitrovica. According to the 2024 census, it had 119 inhabitants, all of whom were Albanian.

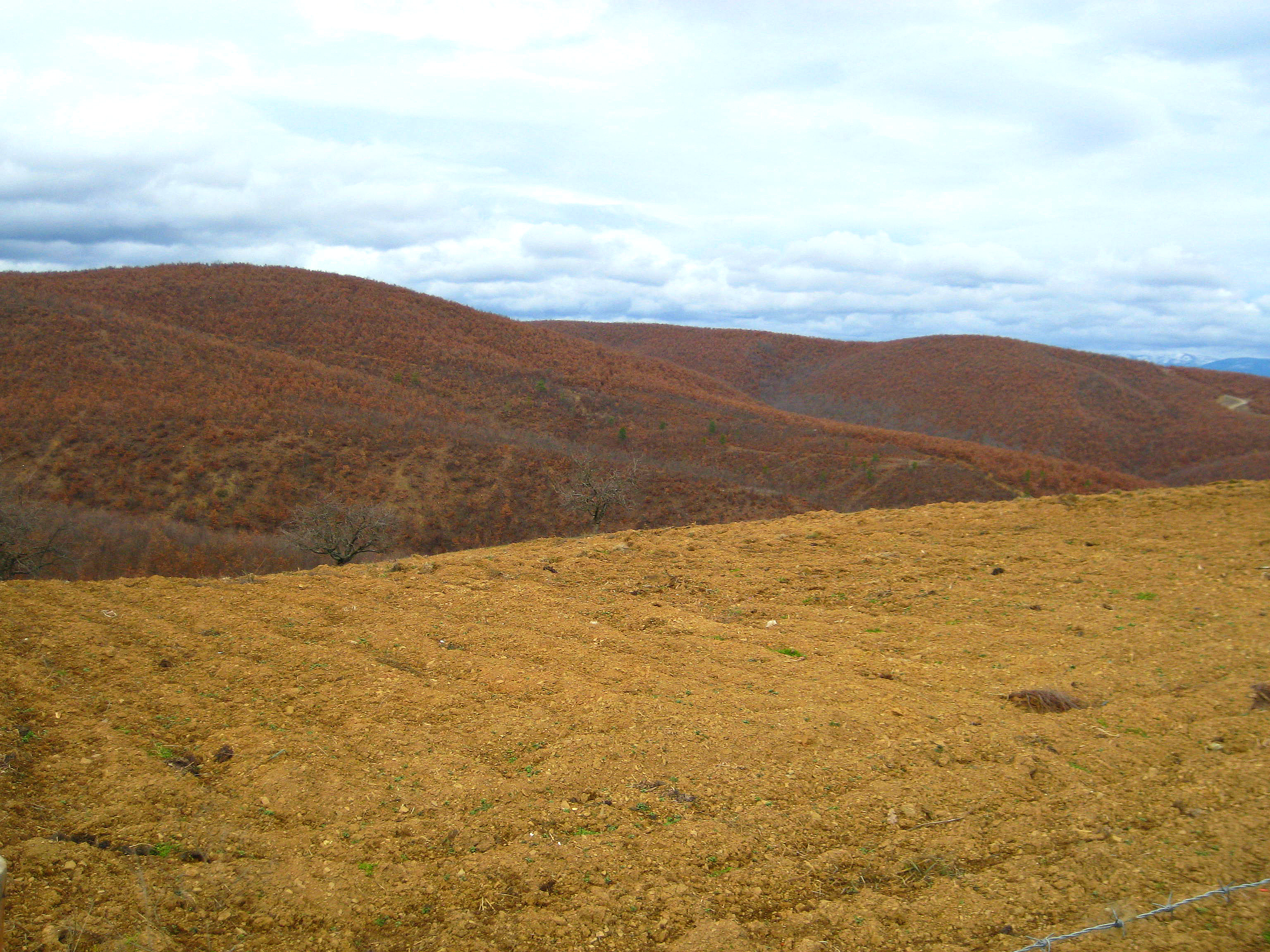
Kotorr

== Geography ==
The village is located on the north side of the Peja-Mitrovica road, some 8 kilometres north-west of Skenderaj.

== History ==
The village has been inhabited since late antiquity. In the south western part of the village the archeological locality of Kotorr Fortress (Albanian Gradina e Kotorrit) is situated, which based on the archeological findings, it goes back to 4th-5th century AD.

Kotorr was mentioned in the 1455 Ottoman defter (tax registry) of the conquered lands of Gjergj Kastrioti Skenderbeu. The village had an old church, of which only micro-toponyms exist today: "Church" ( Kisha), and "Church Valley" (Lugu i Kishës).

After the Kosovo War, during the presence of the NATO-led peacekeeping Kosovo Force, two houses belonging to Serbs were burnt down and one house was illegally occupied.

== Demographics ==
Historical population

Year	Pop.	±%
1948	401	—
1953	422	+5.2%
1961	422	+0.0%
1971	430	+1.9%

Year	Pop.	±%
1981	494	+14.9%
1991	516	+4.5%
2011	279	−45.9%
2024	119	−57.3%
