= Donje Ljubinje =

Donje Ljubinje Donje Ljubinje (Bosnian) Доње Љубиње (Serbian) Lubinjë e Poshtme (Albanian)
- Village
- Location in Kosovo
- Location: Kosovo
- District: Prizren
- Municipality: Prizren

Population (2024)
  - Total: 1,632
- Time zone: UTC+1 (CET)
  - Summer (DST): UTC+2 (CEST)

Donje Ljubinje (Serbian Cyrillic: Доње Љубиње, Albanian: Lubinjë e Poshtme) is a village in Prizren Municipality, Kosovo. It is located in the historical region of Sredačka župa. According to the 2024 population census, the village had 1,632 inhabitants, with 1,627 being Bosniaks.

The village attracts media attention because of the centuries-old tradition of bride decoration among local Bosniak population. This tradition, once widespread in the area, is now only performed by one elder woman from Donje Ljubinje named Aziza Šefitagić.
