= Tučep =

- Village
- Location in Kosovo
- Location: Kosovo
- District: Peja
- Municipality: Istog

Population (2024)
  - Total: 40
- Time zone: UTC+1 (CET)
  - Summer (DST): UTC+2 (CEST)

Tučep (Serbian Cyrillic: Тучеп, Albanian: Tuqep) is a village/settlement in the Istog municipality, Kosovo.

The village was predominantly Serb. Its Serb population was displaced in June 1999, following the Kosovo War, but returned subsequently. However they face harassment, and lack of electricity.

== Population ==
Ethnic Composition
Year	Serbs	%	others	%	Total
1961	401	97.09%	12	2.91%	413
1971	395	96.58%	14	3.42%	409
1981	351	100.00%	0	0.00%	351
1991	317	99.69%	1	0.31%	318
The only other groups were in 1961 and 1971 Montenegrins, and in 1991 one Yugoslav.

== See also ==
- Anti-Serb sentiment
