= Magjerë, Mitrovica =

Mađare Magjerë
- Village
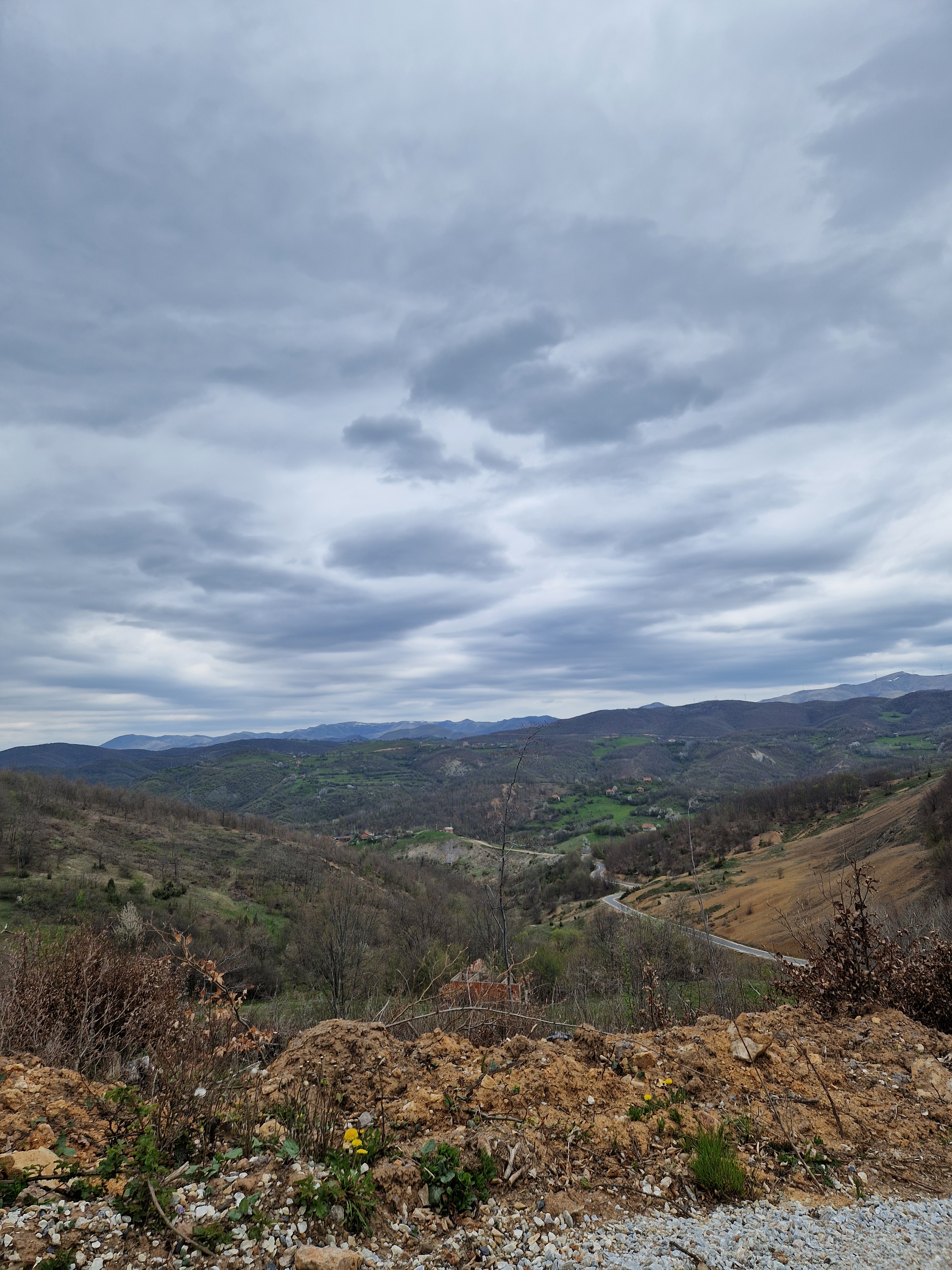
- Magjerë in 2023

- Location in Kosovo
- Coordinates: 42°58′00″N 20°54′45″E
- Location: Kosovo
- District: Mitrovicë
- Municipality: Mitrovicë

Population (2024)
  - Total: 14
- Time zone: UTC+1 (CET)
  - Summer (DST): UTC+2 (CEST)

Magjerë (in Albanian) or Mađare (in Serbian: Мађаре) is a village in the municipality of Mitrovica in the District of Mitrovica, Kosovo. According to the 2024 census, it has 14 inhabitants, all Albanians.
