= Lushtë =

Lushtë Ljušta
- Village
- Location in Kosovo
- Coordinates: 42°51′09″N 20°49′45″E
- Location: Kosovo
- District: Mitrovicë
- Municipality: Mitrovicë
- Elevation: 581 m (1,906 ft)

Population (2024)
  - Total: 577
- Time zone: UTC+1 (CET)
  - Summer (DST): UTC+2 (CEST)

Lushtë (in Albanian) or Ljušta (in Serbian) is a village in the municipality of Mitrovica in the District of Mitrovica, Kosovo. According to the 2011 census, it has 577 inhabitants.

== Demography ==
In 2024 census, the village had in total 577 inhabitants, from whom 576 were Albanians and one (0,16 %) Bosniak.

Historical population

| Year | Pop. | ±% |
|---|---|---|
| 1948 | 209 | — |
| 1953 | 230 | +10.0% |
| 1961 | 230 | +0.0% |
| 1971 | 296 | +28.7% |

| Year | Pop. | ±% |
|---|---|---|
| 1981 | 462 | +56.1% |
| 1991 | 501 | +8.4% |
| 2011 | 637 | +27.1% |
| 2024 | 577 | −9.4% |

Source: Evolution of the population 1948-2011
