= Slup, Kosovo =

Sllup Slup
- Village
- Location within Kosovo
- Coordinates: 42°30′32″N 20°16′55″E
- Country: Kosovo
- District: Gjakova
- Municipality: Deçan
- Elevation: 577 m (1,893 ft)

Population (2024)
  - Total: 250
- Time zone: UTC+1 (Central European Time)
  - Summer (DST): UTC+2 (CEST)

Slup (also known as Слуп in Cyrillic and also transliterated as Sllup and sometimes Sllupi) is a village in the Deçan Municipality, District of Gjakova, Kosovo.
