= Koprivë, Mitrovica =

Koprivë Kopriva Kopërzë
- Village
- Location in Kosovo
- Coordinates: 42°51′15″N 20°47′31″E
- Location: Kosovo
- District: Mitrovicë
- Municipality: Mitrovicë
- Elevation: 726 m (2,382 ft)

Population (2024)
  - Total: 47
- Time zone: UTC+1 (CET)
  - Summer (DST): UTC+2 (CEST)

Koprivë (Albanian: Kopërzë) or Kopriva (in Serbian: Коприва) is a village in the municipality of Mitrovica in the District of Mitrovica, Kosovo. According to the 2011 census, it has 55 inhabitants, all Albanians.

== Monuments ==
An Albanian-Catholic church is located in Koprivë, known by the local Albanians as „Kisha e Prekës” meaning Prekë’s church.
