= Tunel i Parë =

Tunel i Parë Prvi Tunel
- Village
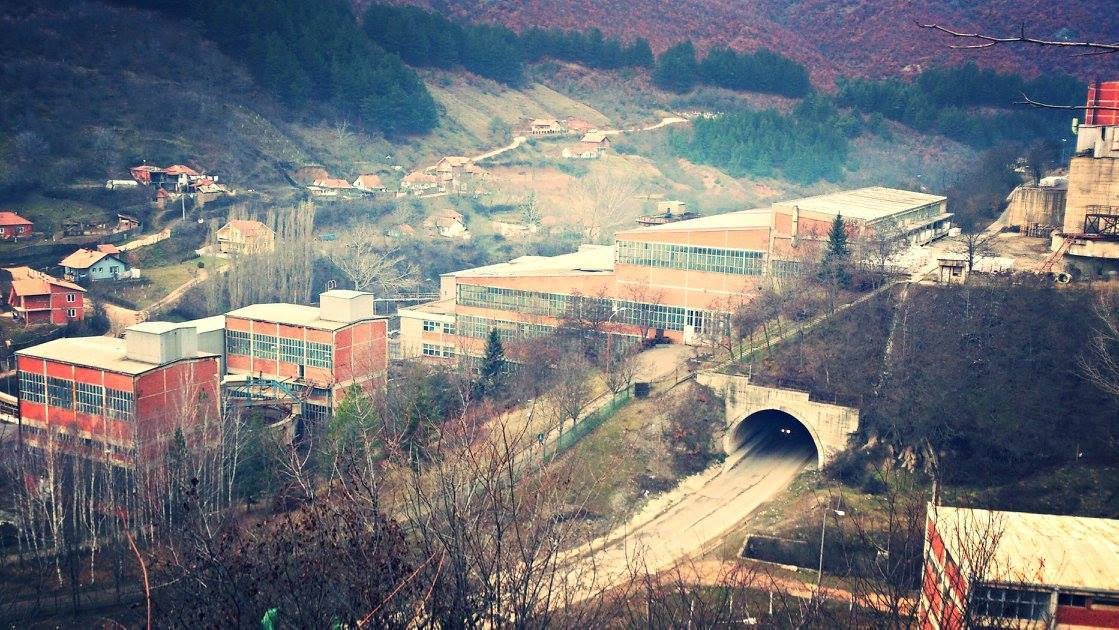

- Location in Kosovo
- Coordinates: 42°55′20″N 20°53′54″E
- Location: Kosovo
- District: Mitrovicë
- Municipality: Mitrovicë
- Elevation: 865 m (2,838 ft)

Population (2024)
  - Total: 644
- Time zone: UTC+1 (CET)
  - Summer (DST): UTC+2 (CEST)

Tunel i Parë (in Albanian) or Prvi Tunel (in Serbian: Први Тунел) is a settlement in the municipality of Mitrovica in the District of Mitrovica, Kosovo. According to the 2024 census, it has 644 inhabitants.

== History ==
Tuneli i Parë was founded by British people as a mining colony in 1924. It is said that they bought the properties from the local Albanian population for the housing of the miners who were not from Mitrovica, but from other places of Yugoslavia like Dalmatia, Lika or Hercegovina. During the Second World War, a concentration camp was built by the Germans where an estimated number of 130 humans were deported.

== Demography ==
In 2024 census, the village had in total 644 inhabitants, from whom 641 were Albanians.

Historical population

Year	Pop.	±%
1948	680	—
1953	1,290	+89.7%
1961	1,627	+26.1%
1971	1,528	−6.1%

Year	Pop.	±%
1981	1,602	+4.8%
1991	1,646	+2.7%
2011	1,006	−38.9%
2024	644	−36.0%

Source: Evolution of the population 1948-2011

== See also ==
- Trepça Mines
