= Bube =

Bube is a surname. Notable people with the surname include:

- Andreas Bube (born 1987), Danish middle-distance runner
- Richard H. Bube (1927–2018), American scientist and writer

== See also ==
- Bube language, a Bantu language
- Central Hotel (Mount Joy, Pennsylvania), a historic property and home to Bube's Brewery
