= Berkovo =

Bërkovë Berkovo
- Village
- Location in Kosovo
- Location: Kosovo
- District: Pejë
- Municipality: Klinë

Population (2024)
  - Total: 186
- Time zone: UTC+1 (CET)
  - Summer (DST): UTC+2 (CEST)

Berkovo (Serbian Cyrillic: Берково, Albanian: Berkovë) (Note: Alternative names that may be seen in various publications: Berkova, Berkove, Berkovo, Berkovë, Bërkova, Topiaj, Берково) is a village in the Klina municipality, Kosovo.

== History ==
The village was mentioned in the 1455 Ottoman defter of the District of Branković as a settlement. It was created as a village under the name Beroko in 1485. It began on the left bank of a river in the middle of the Klina–Đurakovac–Peć route and was located eight kilometers from Klina.

The village of Berkovo in the then-municipality of Zlokućan, in the district of Isloch, in the Devič castle, was more than once inhabited between 1769 and 1785. The settlement was divided into several neighborhoods, which were named after the names of the larger families who lived in them: Pavlović, Panić, Banjci, Živković, Lazarević, Mašić, Jeremić, and others.

The most numerous and oldest families in Berkovo are: Živkovići, Lazarevići, Banjci, Misirlići and Panlići. Vučkovići, Jevlići, Mašići and Milanovići settled later.

At the end of the 19th century, it had 440 inhabitants with Serbian houses and some Albanian villages of the Roman Catholic faith. In the 20th century, the majority of the inhabitants of Berkovo were Serbian salt miners, who settled in 1912.

The village received electricity in 1969 and the local road Klina-Đurakovac was asphalted from 1980 to 1982. Fixed telephones were installed in 1997. The hamlets are interconnected by earthen roads.

It had a Serbian majority before the Kosovo War. As the village was destroyed, houses were looted and demolished. In 2008 there were some 40 Serbs from 33 families there.

== Population ==
Ethnic Composition
Year	Serbs	%	others	%	Total
1961	479	96.38%	18	3.62%	497
1971	517	93.83%	34	6.17%	551
1981	450	90.18%	49	9.82%	499
1991	339	97.98%	7	2.02%	346
