= Ruhot =

- Village
- Location in Kosovo
- Location: Kosovo
- District: Peja
- Municipality: Peja

Population (2024)
  - Total: 410
- Time zone: UTC+1 (CET)
  - Summer (DST): UTC+2 (CEST)

Ruhot is a village in the municipality of Peja. It is located in a larger region which is known as Rrafshi i Dugagjinit, famous for its fertile land and beautiful nature. White Drin flows along the whole north side of the village and is used as a source of water for crops.
