= Lisicë, Mitrovica =

Lisicë Lisica
- Village
- Location in Kosovo
- Coordinates: 42°54′27″N 20°53′00″E
- Location: Kosovo
- District: Mitrovicë
- Municipality: Mitrovicë
- Elevation: 617 m (2,024 ft)

Population (2024)
  - Total: 465
- Time zone: UTC+1 (CET)
  - Summer (DST): UTC+2 (CEST)

Lisicë (in Albanian) or Lisica (Serbian Cyrillic: Лисица) is a village in the municipality of Mitrovica in the District of Mitrovica, Kosovo. According to the 2011 census, it has 519 inhabitants. Originally the village was named "Te Lisi" meaning "To the tree". The Serbian re-naming means "fox".

== Demography ==
In 2011 census, the village had in total 519 inhabitants, from whom 517 (99,61 %) were Albanians and one Bosniak. One was not available.
