= Kutlloc =

Kutllovc Kutllovc
- Village
- Kutllovc
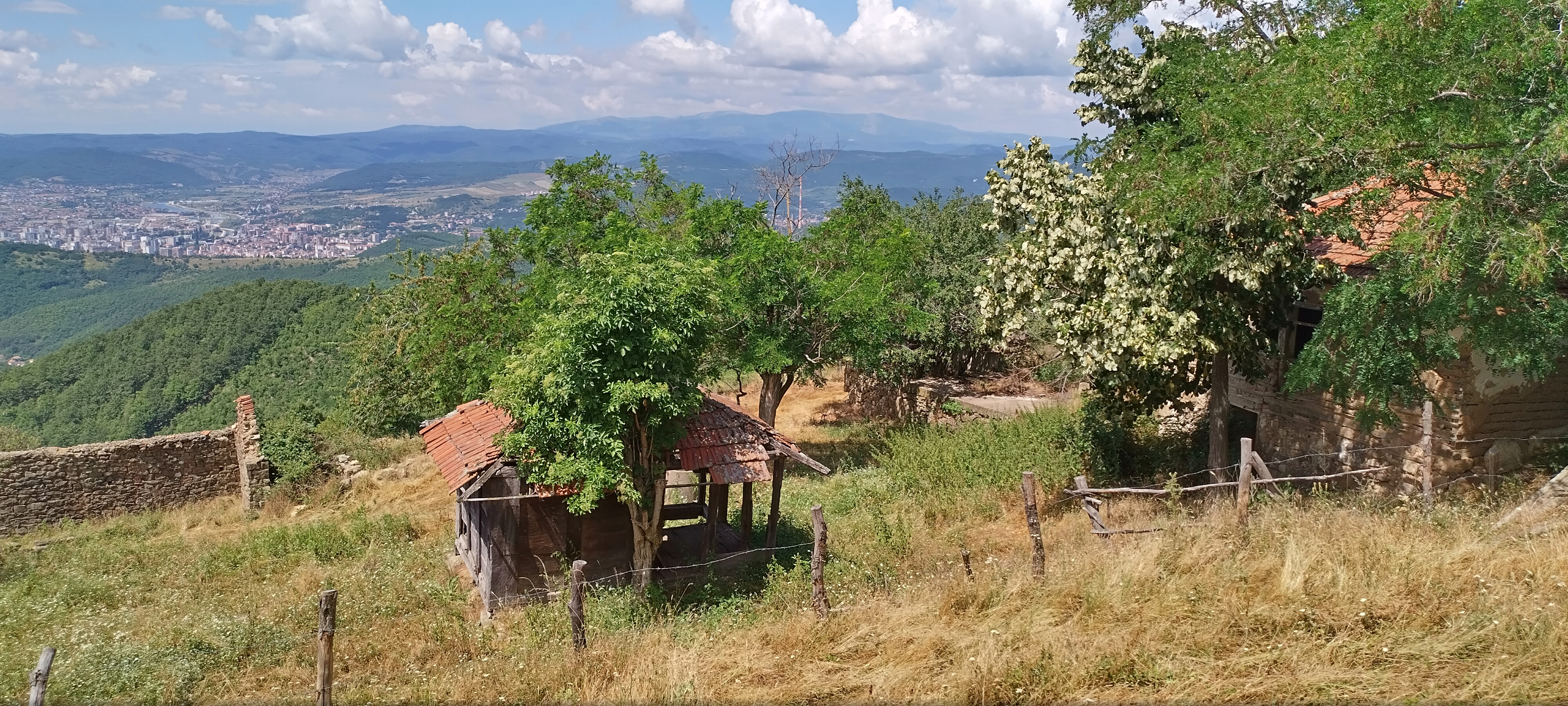
- Kutllovc and Mitrovica in the background

- Location in Kosovo
- Coordinates: 42°55′04″N 20°55′07″E
- Location: Kosovo
- District: Mitrovicë
- Municipality: Mitrovicë
- Elevation: 878 m (2,881 ft)

Population (2024)
  - Total: 339
- Time zone: UTC+1 (CET)
  - Summer (DST): UTC+2 (CEST)

Kutlloc (in Kosova) is a village in the municipality of Mitrovica in the District of Mitrovica, Kosovo. According to the 2011 census, it has 473 inhabitants.

== Demography ==
In the 2011 census, the village had a total of 473 inhabitants, all of whom were Albanians.
