= Tërnavicë =

Tërnavicë Trnavica
- Village
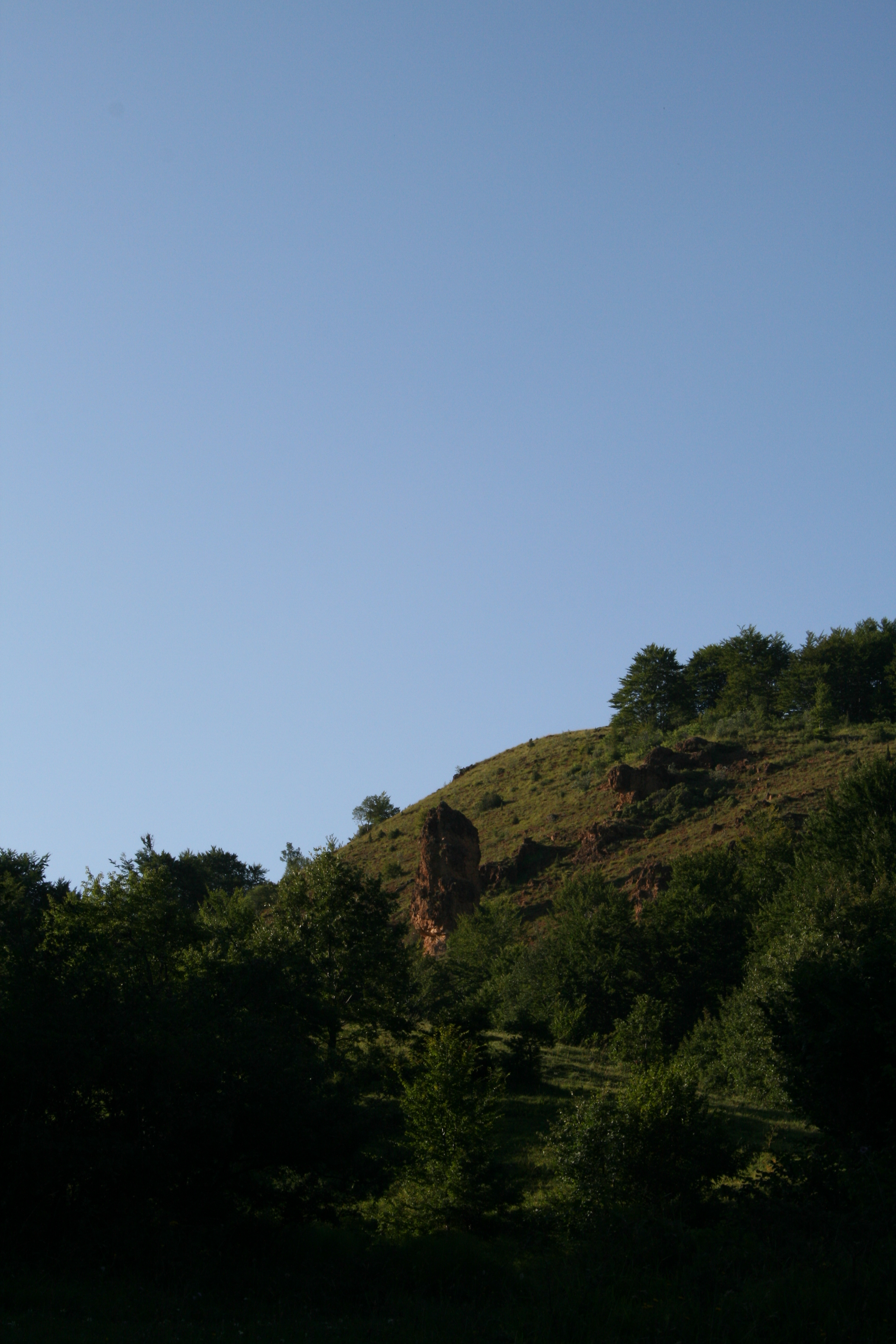
- An interesting rock formation

- Location in Kosovo
- Location: Kosovo
- District: Pristina
- Municipality: Podujevë

Population (2024)
  - Total: 0
- Time zone: UTC+1 (CET)
  - Summer (DST): UTC+2 (CEST)

Tërnavicë, (Albanian: Tërnavicë/Tërnavica, Gurkrypas/Gurkrypasi; Serbian: Трнавица/Trnavica, Трновица/Trnovica) is a village near Podujevo, Kosovo.

== Places of interest ==
- There is a large free standing rock.
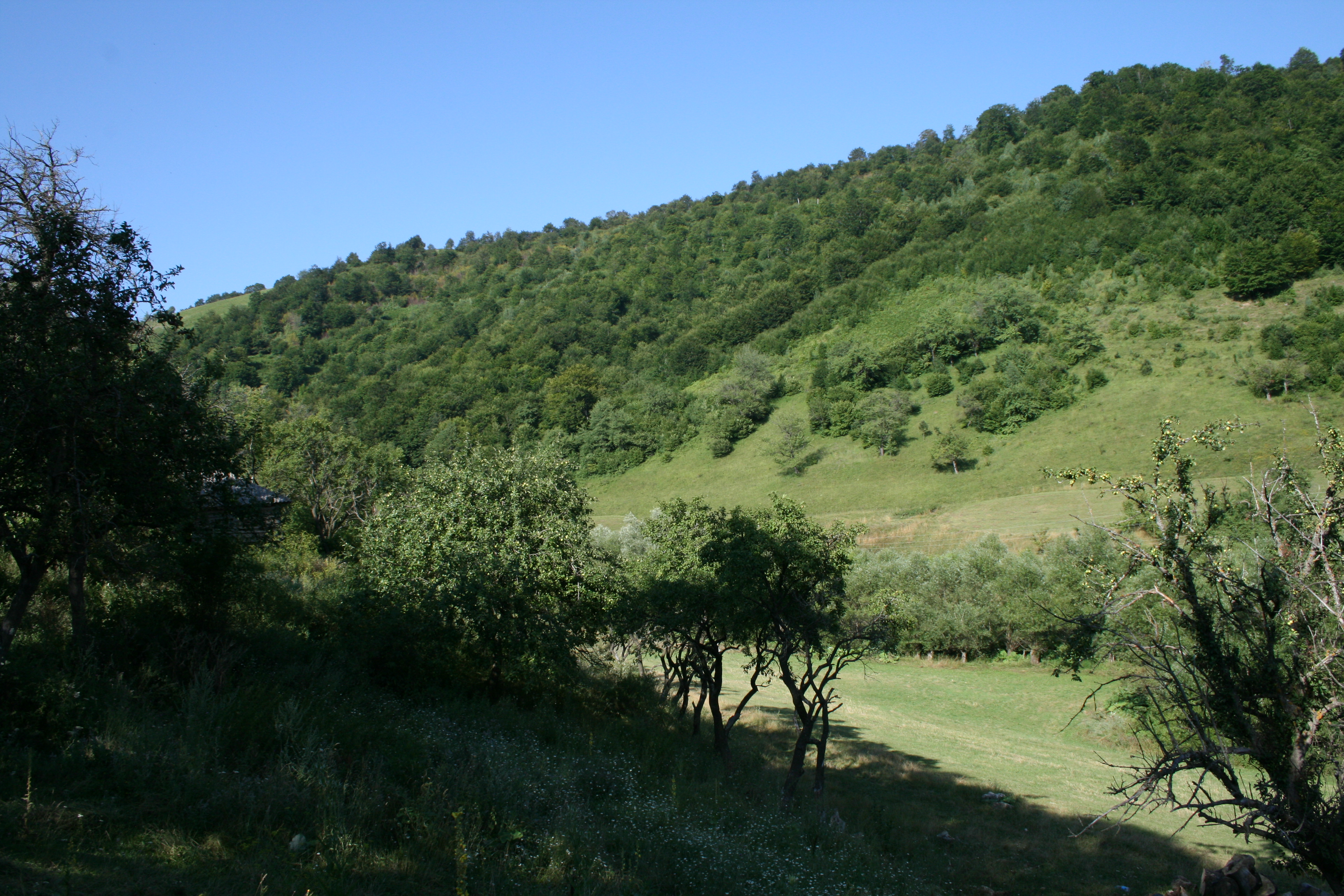

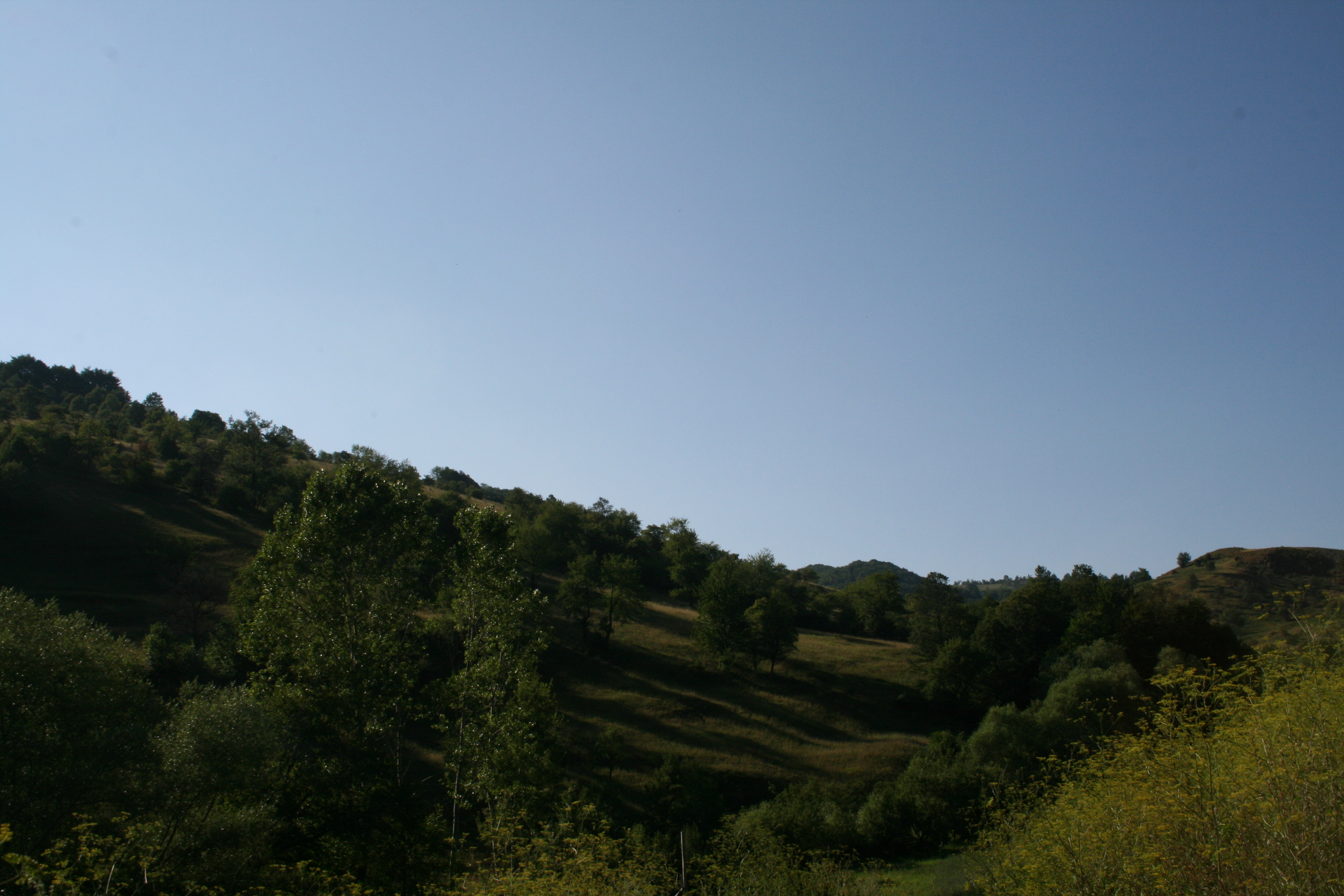

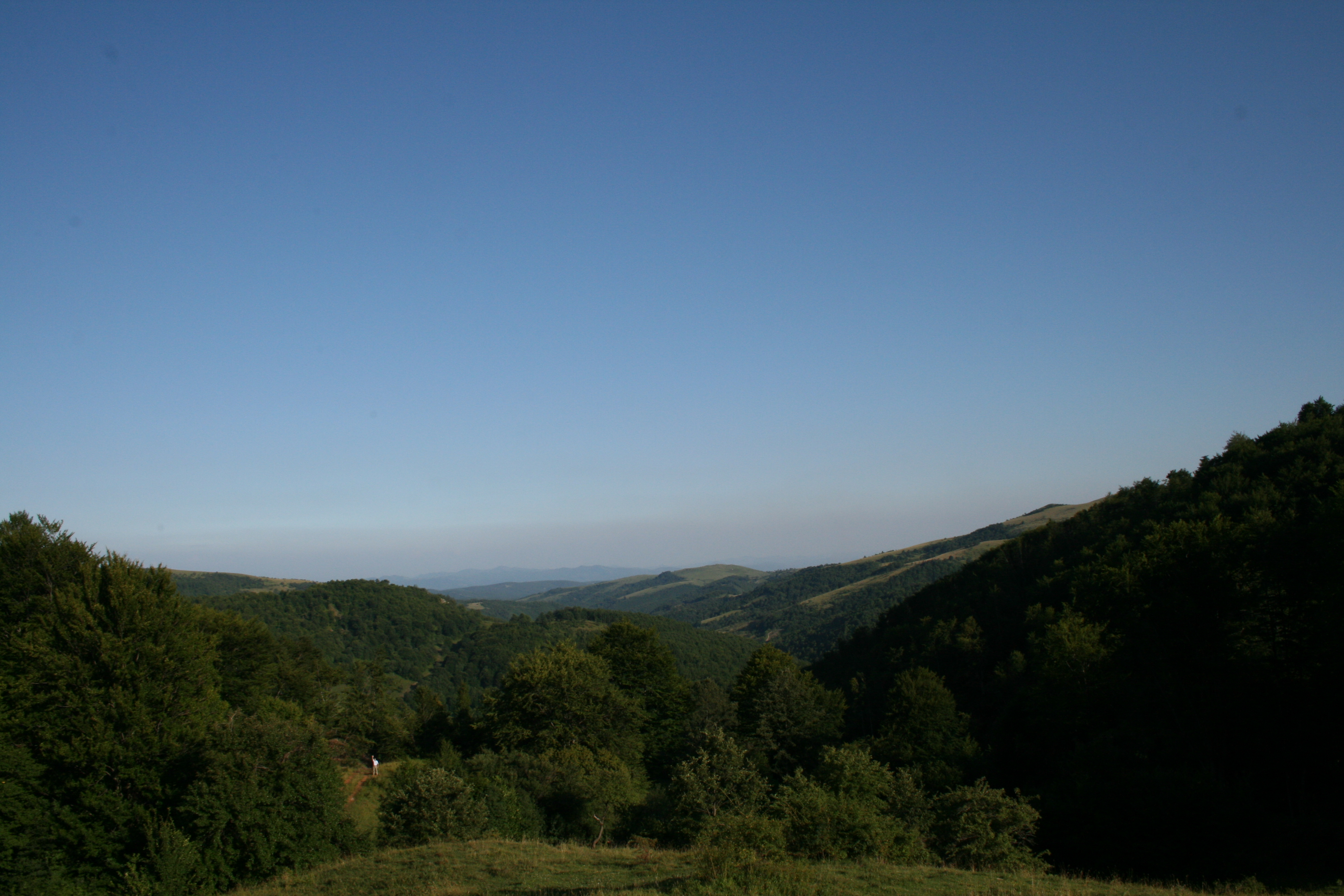

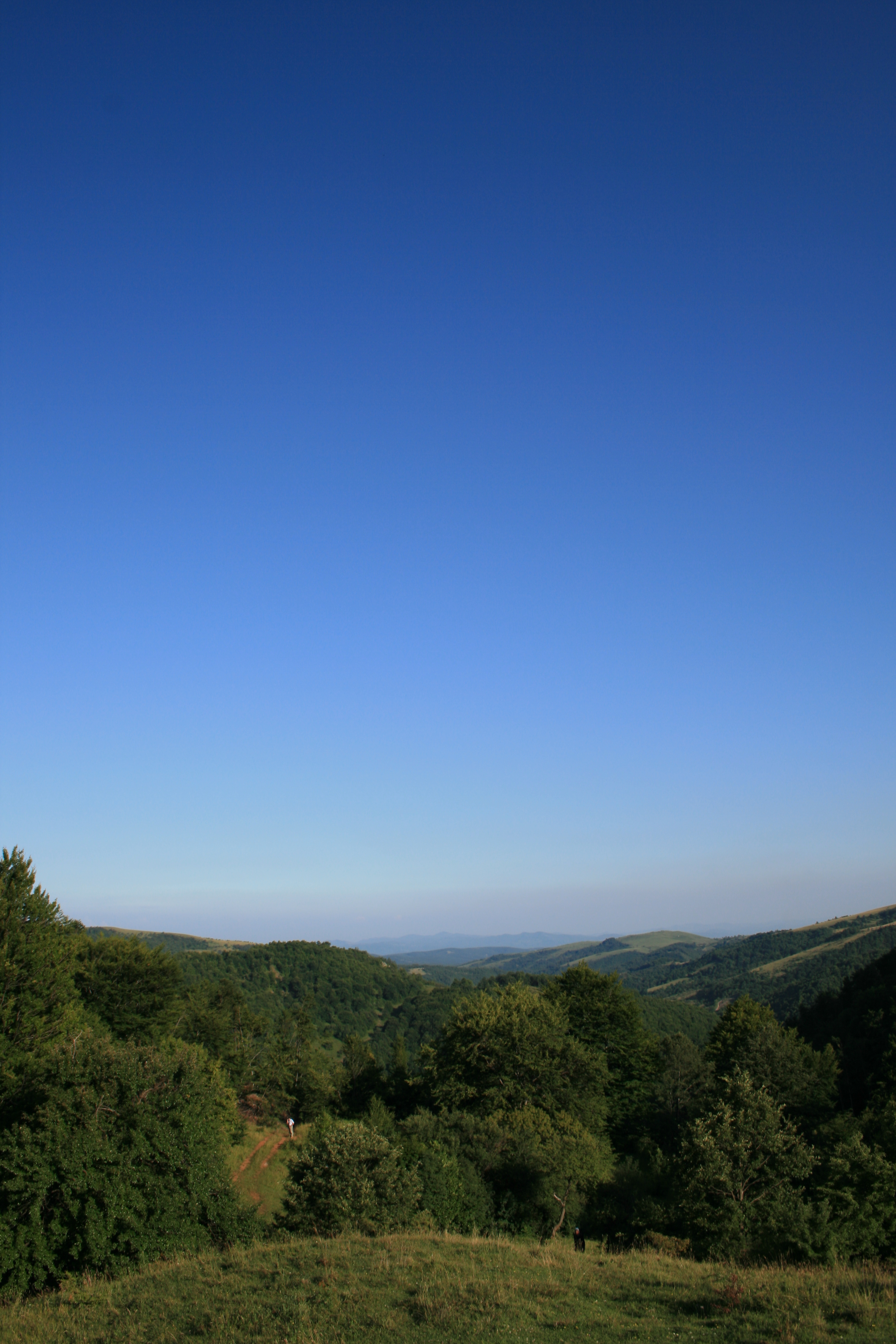

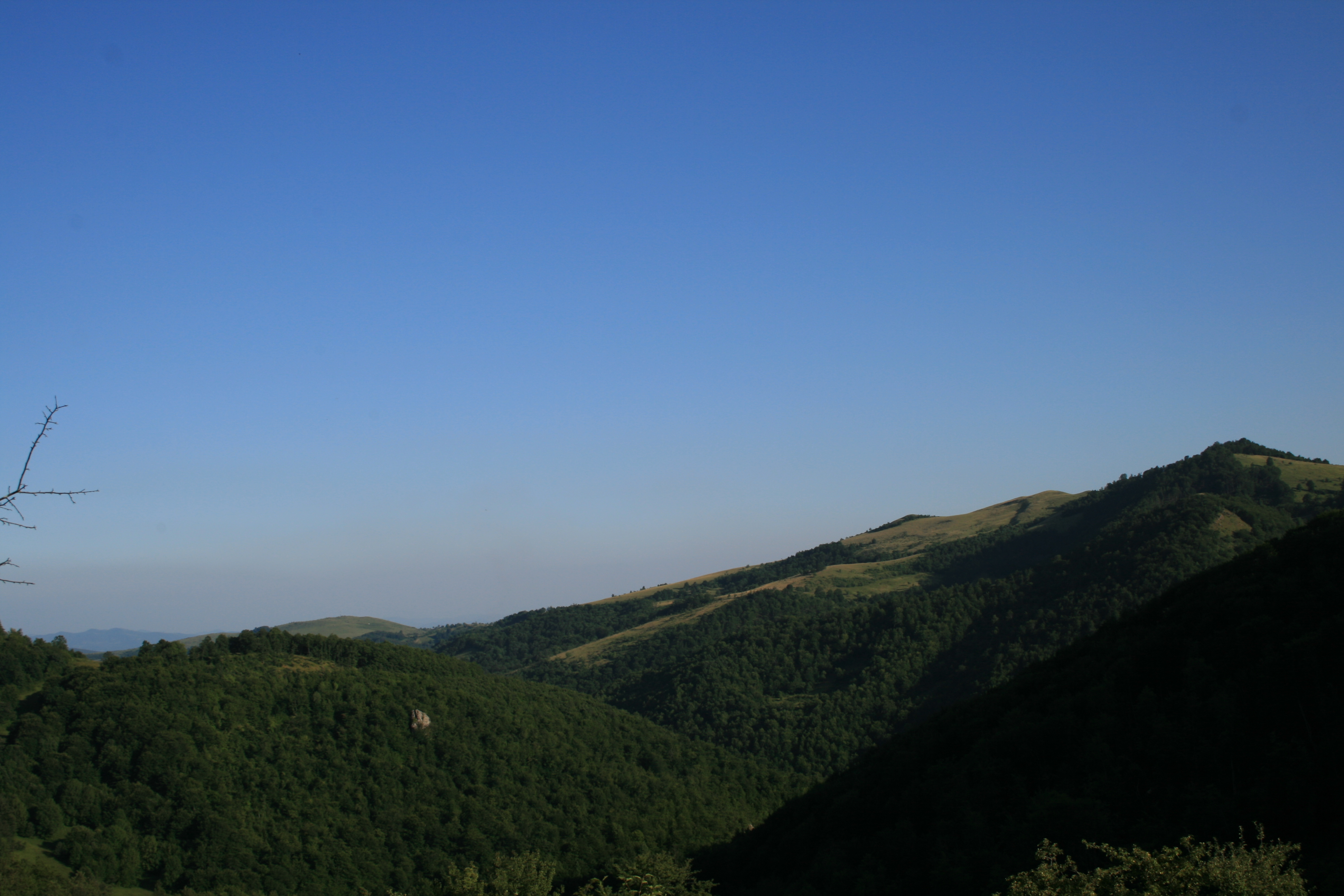

== Events ==
- A church existed until the local Serbian population migrated in 1878.
