= Zhabar i Poshtëm =

Zhabar i Poshtëm Donje Žabare
- Suburb
- Location in Kosovo
- Coordinates: 42°52′17″N 20°50′28″E
- Location: Kosovo
- District: Mitrovicë
- Municipality: Mitrovicë
- Elevation: 534 m (1,752 ft)

Population (2024)
  - Total: 6,470
- Time zone: UTC+1 (CET)
  - Summer (DST): UTC+2 (CEST)

Zhabar i Poshtëm (in Albanian) or Donje Žabare is a suburb in the municipality of Mitrovica in the District of Mitrovica, Kosovo. Another name is Fushibri i Poshtëm. According to the 2024 census, it has 6,470 inhabitants.

== Demography ==
In 2024 census, the village had in total 6,470 inhabitants, from whom 6,459 were Albanians

== Notable people ==
- Vjosa Osmani, current president of Kosovo and Kosovan jurist
