= Stublina =

Stublina Стублина
- Village
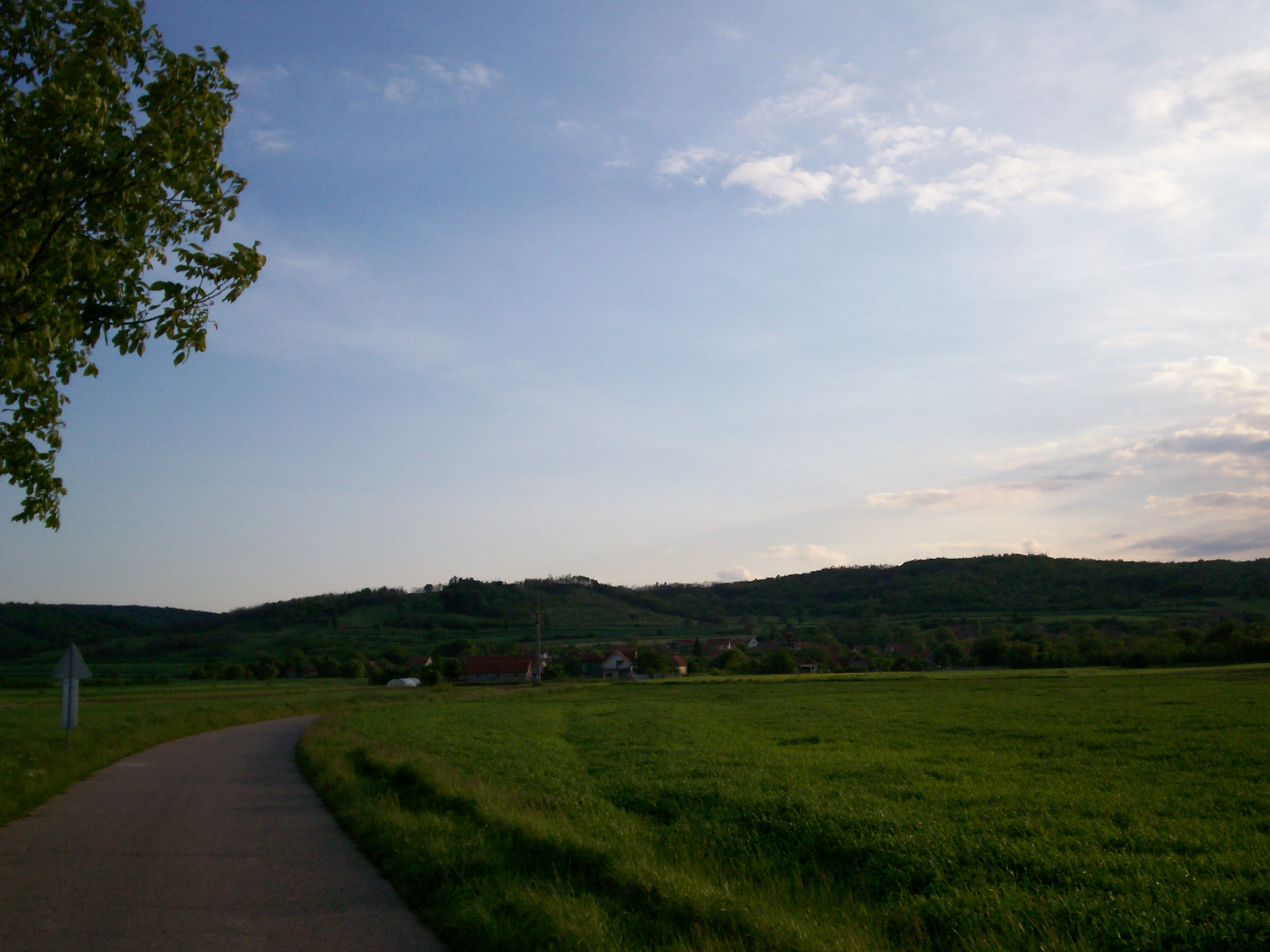

- Location within Serbia
- Coordinates: 43°28′N 21°42′E
- Country: Serbia
- District: Nišava
- Municipality: Aleksinac

Government
  - President: Zvezdan Pesić
- Elevation: 568 ft (173 m)

Population (2022)
  - Total: 134
- Time zone: UTC+1 (CET)
  - Summer (DST): UTC+2 (CEST)
- Postal code: 18210

Stublina (Serbian: Стублина) is a village in the municipality of Aleksinac, Serbia. According to the 2022 census, the village has a population of 128 people.

Also village Stublina is a home to popular music artist named, GOSHA”
