= Mohlan =

Mohlan: Mohlan (Albanian); Мовљане/Movljane (Serbian)
- Village
- Location in Kosovo
- Location: Kosovo
- District: Prizren
- Municipality: Suva Reka

Population (2024)
  - Total: 340
- Time zone: UTC+1 (CET)
  - Summer (DST): UTC+2 (CEST)

Mohlan is a settlement in the Suva Reka municipality in Kosovo. It is around 30 km south west of Pristina and around 5 km east of Suva Reka town. It lies 715 m above sea level. It is inhabited by ethnic Albanians and Serbs; in the 1991 census, it had 487 inhabitants.

Demographic history
Ethnic group	1948	1953	1961	1971	1981	1991
Albanians					282	
Serbs					168	
Total	320	326	311	408	450	487
