= Stančić =

Stančić is a South Slavic surname. Notable people with the name include:

- Dino Stančič (born 1992), Slovenian football player
- Dragan Stančić (born 1982), Serbian football coach and former football player
- Miljenko Stančić (1926–1977), Croatian painter and graphic artist
- Svetislav Stančić (1895–1970), Croatian pianist and music pedagogue
  - International Piano Competition Svetislav Stančić
- Zora Stančič (born 1956), Slovene graphic and visual artist

== See also ==
- Stančić, Croatia, a village near Brckovljani
