= Kamenica, Leposavić =

Kamenica Каменица Kamenicë
- Village
- Location within Kosovo
- Location: Kosovo
- District: Mitrovica
- Municipality: Leposavić

Population (2024)
  - Total: 37
- Time zone: UTC+1 (CET)
  - Summer (DST): UTC+2 (CEST)
- Area code: +383

Kamenica (Serbian Cyrillic: Каменица, Albanian indefinite form: Kamenicë) is a village in Leposavic municipality, northern Kosovo.
