= Krajkovë =

Krajkovë Krajkova
- Village
- Location in Kosovo
- Location: Kosovo
- District: Pristina
- Municipality: Glogovac

Population (2024)
  - Total: 958
- Time zone: UTC+1 (CET)
  - Summer (DST): UTC+2 (CEST)

Krajkova or Krajkovë is a village in the municipality of Glogovac in Kosovo.

Krajkova is bordered by villages: Llapushnik, Domonek, Shtrubulovë and Zabel I Ulët, and very close to Drenas, 5 km west. Krajkova is known as an ancient settlement where the archive documents of the former Ottoman Empire and the Austro-Hungarian Empire also shown. An Argument might be that the Mosque of Krajkovë is the second- most ancient built Mosque in Kosovo, in the time of the Ottoman Empire, in 1480.

The settlements are along Kosovo's central mountain "Mali Kosmaç" or Mount Kosmaç, as an important touristic and geostrategic position for the region. The peak of Kosmaçi is 1,031 m high. Krajkova is populated with ethnic Albanians, The village has approximately 132 houses and over 1818 inhabitants, and the birthplace of the great Kosovan comedian, Ibrahim Krajkova. Krajkova is also known as the resistance land of many wars over the centuries, especially during the Kosovo War where many residents were ranked in the line of the Kosovo Liberation Army, with many historic figures, like: Dr.Hafir Shala, National Heroes: Luljeta Shala, Gani Elshani, Vehbi Hoxha Mehdi Hoxha.

Krajkova is an agricultural-based, rural village with wheat and maize as the primary crops. The Cattle Farm in Krajkovo is now utilised, making possible for a lot of residents to work there.

The village has a primary school named after national hero Gani Elshani, with approximately 400 students."

There are more than 8 neighborhoods, like : Podrimqaku, Shala, Hoxha, Elshani, Neziri, Buzaku, Zeneli and Imeri neighborhood.
