= Greikoc =

Greikoc: Greikoc (Albanian)
- Village
- Location in Republic of Kosovo
- Location: Kosovo
- District: Prizren
- Municipality: Suharekë

Population (2024)
  - Total: 2,261
- Time zone: UTC+1 (CET)
  - Summer (DST): UTC+2 (CEST)

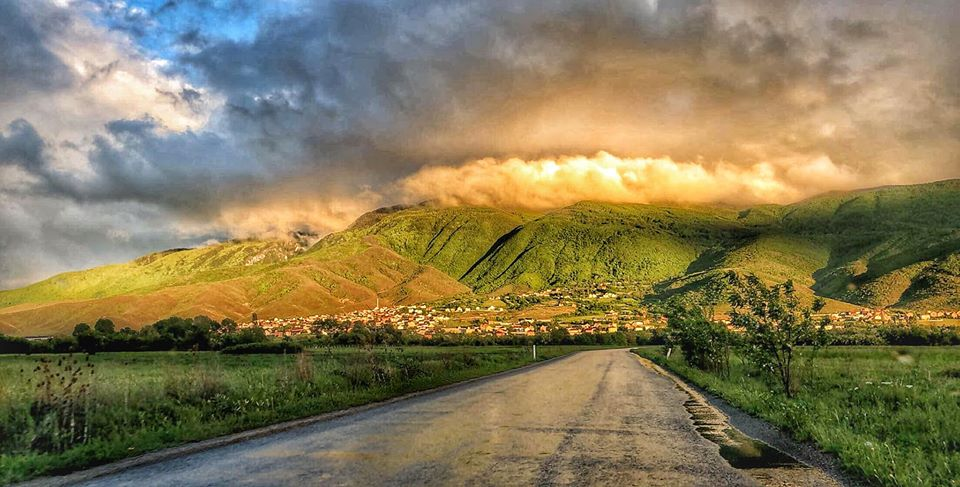
Brendon Canaj

Greikoc (in Albanian) or Grejkoc is a village in the municipality of Suharekë, in Republic of Kosovo. It is located in the district of Prizren. Greikoc lies in the region of Rrafshi i Dukagjinit. In the northeast and east, it is surrounded by the Sharr Mountains, while in the west part, it extends all the way down to the plains. Farming is mainly primitive; fields are used to cultivate plants like wheat, corn or to collect hay, while pastures are used to raise and feed animals like cows, sheep, chickens, etc.
