= Malaj =

Malaj is an Albanian surname. Notable people with the surname include:

- Abedin Malaj (born 1991), Albanian graphic designer
- Andrew Malaj (born 2008), American swimmer of Albanian descent
- Arben Malaj (born 1961), Albanian Minister of Finance and Economy
- Arber Malaj (born 1989), Albanian football defender
- Argjend Malaj (born 1994), Kosovar-Albanian football midfielder
- Geri Malaj (born 1989), Albanian footballer
- Musab Malaj (born 1996), Kosovan basketball player
- Petrit Malaj (born 1978), Albanian economist and politician
- Soni Malaj (born 1981), Albanian singer

== See also ==
- Malaj Khand, a city and a municipality in India
