= Gremë =

Village in Kosovo

- Village
- Interactive map of Gremë
- Location within Kosovo
- Coordinates: 42°19′6″N 21°9′26″E
- Country: Kosovo
- District: Ferizaj
- Municipality: Ferizaj

Population (2024)
  - Total: 4,207
- Time zone: UTC+1 (CET)
  - Summer (DST): UTC+2 (CEST)

Gremë is a village in Ferizaj Municipality, Kosovo. According to the Kosovo Agency of Statistics (KAS) from the 2024 census, there were 4,207 people residing in Gremë, with Albanians constituting the majority of the population.
