= Sedlare =

- Village
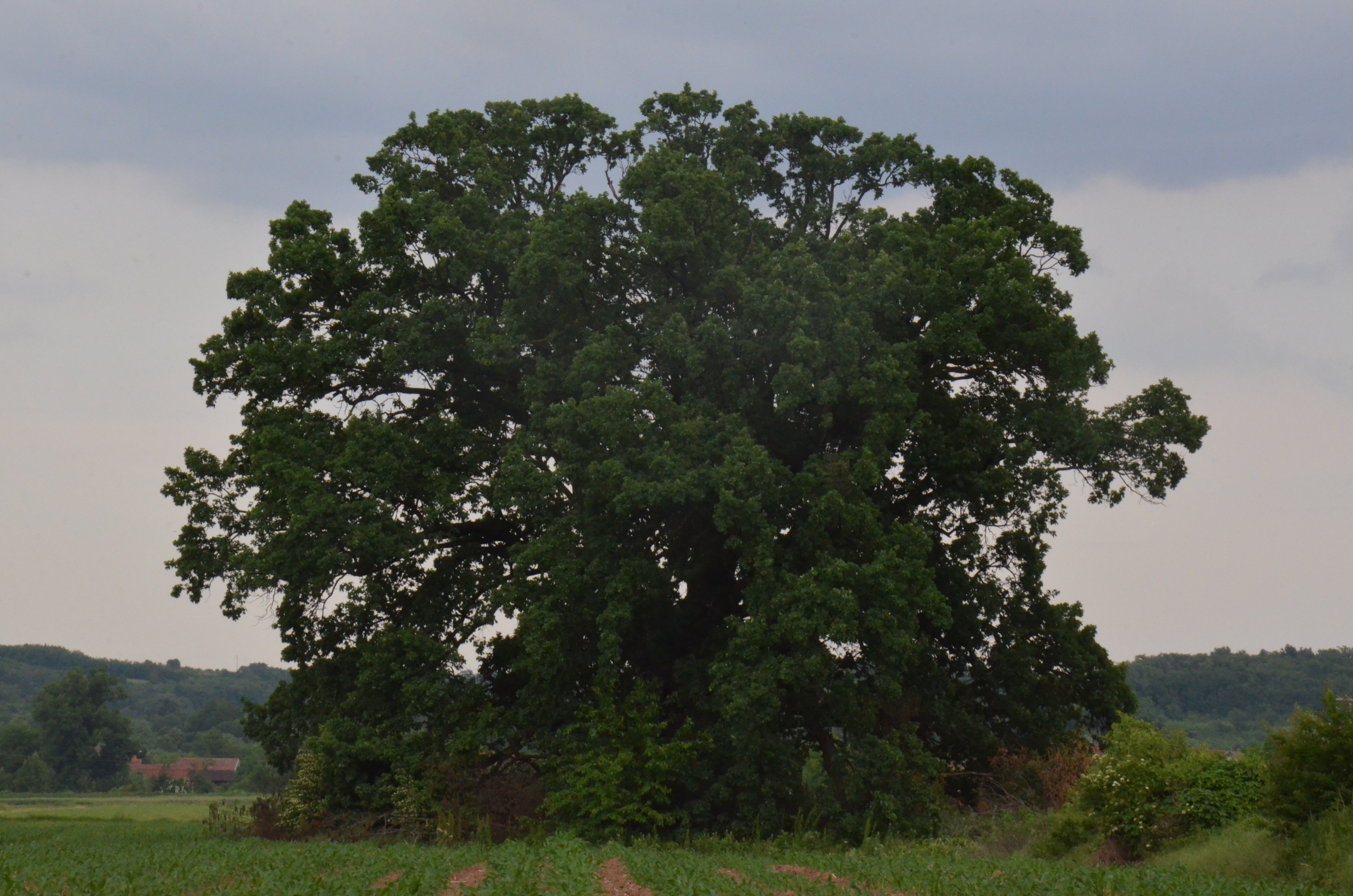

- Location within Serbia
- Coordinates: 44°11′43″N 21°18′04″E
- Country: Serbia
- District: Pomoravlje District
- Municipality: Svilajnac

Population (2002)
  - Total: 690
- Time zone: UTC+1 (CET)
  - Summer (DST): UTC+2 (CEST)

Sedlare is a village in the municipality of Svilajnac, Serbia. According to the 2002 census, the village has a population of 690 people.
