= Sallagrazhdë =

Sallagrazhdë: Sallagrazhdë (Albanian); Селогражде/Selogražde (Serbian)
- Village
- Location in Kosovo
- Location: Kosovo
- District: Prizren
- Municipality: Suharekë

Population (2024)
  - Total: 947
- Time zone: UTC+1 (CET)
  - Summer (DST): UTC+2 (CEST)

Sallagrazhdë or (Albanian: Sallagrazhda) is a settlement in the Suva Reka municipality of Kosovo. It lies 491 metres (1,611 ft) above sea level. It has a homogeneous Albanian population. It is the only village of Suva Reka where Catholic Albanians live. In the 2024 census, it had 947 inhabitants.

== Demographics ==
Demographic history
Ethnic group	1948	1953	1961	1971	1981	1991	2011	2024
Albanians					986 (95.73%)		1388 (100%)	947 (100%)
Serbs					44 (4.27%)		-	-
Total	503	553	646	819	1030	1463	1388	947
