= Delloc =

Delloc: Delloc (Albanian); Деловце/Delovce (Serbian)
- Village
- Location in Kosovo
- Location: Kosovo
- District: Prizren
- Municipality: Suharekë
- Elevation: 1,097 m (3,599 ft)

Population (2024)
  - Total: 137
- Time zone: UTC+1 (CET)
  - Summer (DST): UTC+2 (CEST)

Delloc or Delovce is a settlement in the Suhareka municipality in the Republic of Kosovo. It lies 1.097 m above sea level. As of 2024, the village had 137 inhabitants and all of them are ethnic Albanians.

Demographic history
| Ethnic group | 1948 | 1953 | 1961 | 1971 | 1981 | 1991 |
|---|---|---|---|---|---|---|
| Serbs | | | | | 296 | |
| Albanians | | | | | 292 | |
| Montenegrins | | | | | 1 | |
| Total | 534 | 556 | 588 | 676 | 589 | 591 |
