= Brus (surname) =

Brus or de Brus is a surname with multiple origins. Notable people with the surname include:

== Brus ==
- Antonín Brus of Mohelnice (1518–1580), Czech archbishop
- Günter Brus (1938–2024), Austrian artist
- Harry Brus (born 1949), Australian musician
- Louis E. Brus (1943–2026), American chemist
- Shaul Brus (1919–2008), Polish rabbi
- Sven Brus (born 1941), Swedish politician
- Włodzimierz Brus (1921–2007), Polish economist

== de Brus ==
Various members of the Scottish House of Bruce:

- Alexander de Brus (1285–1307), a younger brother of Robert the Bruce, King of Scots
- Alexander de Brus, Earl of Carrick (died 1333)
- Bernard I de Brus of Connington and Exton (died 1268), son of the 4th lord of Annandale and younger brother of the 5th
- Edward de Brus (c. 1280–1318)
- Isabella de Brus (1272–1358), Queen consort of Norway
- Marjorie de Brus (c. 1296–1316 or 1317), eldest daughter of Robert the Bruce
- Neil de Brus (c. 1279–1306), a younger brother of Robert the Bruce
- Robert de Brus (1274–1329), better known as Robert the Bruce, King of Scots
- Robert de Brus, 1st Lord of Annandale (c. 1070–1141)
- Robert de Brus, 2nd Lord of Annandale (died c. 1194)
- Robert de Brus, 4th Lord of Annandale (c. 1195–1245)
- Robert de Brus, 5th Lord of Annandale (c. 1215–1295)
- Robert de Brus, 6th Lord of Annandale (1243–1304)
- Thomas de Brus (c. 1284–1307), son of the 6th lord of Annandale
- William de Brus, 3rd Lord of Annandale (died 1212)

== See also ==
- Helena Wolińska-Brus (1919–2008), Polish military prosecutor
