= Zabllaq =

Zabllaq: Zabllaq (Albanian); Заблаће/Zablaće (Serbian)
- Village
- Location within Kosovo
- Coordinates: 42°41′21″N 20°29′23″E
- Location: Kosovo
- District: Peja
- Municipality: Istog

Population (2024)
  - Total: 428
- Time zone: UTC+1 (Central European Time)
  - Summer (DST): UTC+2 (CEST)

Zabllaq (Serbian: Zablaće) is a village in the municipality of Istog, Kosovo.

== Demographics ==
The village of Zabllaq has a total of 459 inhabitants.

Year	Population
1948	<350
1953	<400
1961	<500
1971	<550
1981	<600
1991	<800
2011	<1000
