= Ovçar, Mitrovica =

Ovçar Ovčare
- Village
- Location in Kosovo
- Coordinates: 43°00′51″N 20°54′25″E
- Location: Kosovo
- District: Mitrovicë
- Municipality: Mitrovicë
- Elevation: 721 m (2,365 ft)

Population (2024)
  - Total: 0
- Time zone: UTC+1 (CET)
  - Summer (DST): UTC+2 (CEST)

Ovçar (in Albanian) or Ovčare (in Serbian: Овчаре) is a village in the municipality of Mitrovica in the District of Mitrovica, Kosovo. According to the 2011 and 2024 census, it doesn't have any inhabitants. Delmar is an alternative name of the village.
