= Makoci, Pristina =

Makoci Makovac
- Village
- Location in Kosovo
- Coordinates: 42°42′16″N 21°13′37″E
- Country: Kosovo
- District: Pristina
- Municipality: Pristina
- Elevation: 773 m (2,536 ft)

Population (2024)
  - Total: 917
- Time zone: UTC+1 (CET)
- Postal code: 10 000

Makoci (in Albanian) and Makovac (in Serbian; Маковац) is a village in the municipality of Pristina in the District of Pristina in Kosovo.

== Demographics ==
According to the 2024 census, the village had in total 917 inhabitants, from whom all were Albanians.

Historical population

Year	Pop.	±%
1948	450	—
1953	473	+5.1%
1961	561	+18.6%
1971	629	+12.1%

Year	Pop.	±%
1981	774	+23.1%
1991	815	+5.3%
2011	997	+22.3%
2024	917	−8.0%
