= Rahovë, Mitrovica =

Rahovë Orahovo
- Village
- Location in Kosovo
- Coordinates: 42°56′16″N 20°53′51″E
- Location: Kosovo
- District: Mitrovicë
- Municipality: Mitrovicë
- Elevation: 819 m (2,687 ft)

Population (2025)
  - Total: 226
- Time zone: UTC+1 (CET)
  - Summer (DST): UTC+2 (CEST)

Rahovë (in Albanian) or Orahovo (in Serbian: Орахово) is a village situated in the municipality of Mitrovica within the District of Mitrovica in North Kosovo. It is located at an elevation of approximately 819 meters (2,687 feet) above sea level.

== Demography ==
In the 2024 census published in 2025, the village had in total 226 inhabitants, from whom 226 (100%) were Albanians.

== Historical and Cultural Context ==
Both the Albanian and Serbian name are derived from "walnut" (arrë in Albanian, orah in Slavic languages), a common naming convention for villages in the Balkans where walnut trees are prevalent.

As is the case with many other rural communities, there have been changes in the number of people living there because of past migrations to cities such as Mitrovica and Pristina and also because of the Kosovo War in the 1990s.
