= Kasterc Fortress =

Fortress in Kosovo

Kasterc Fortress site
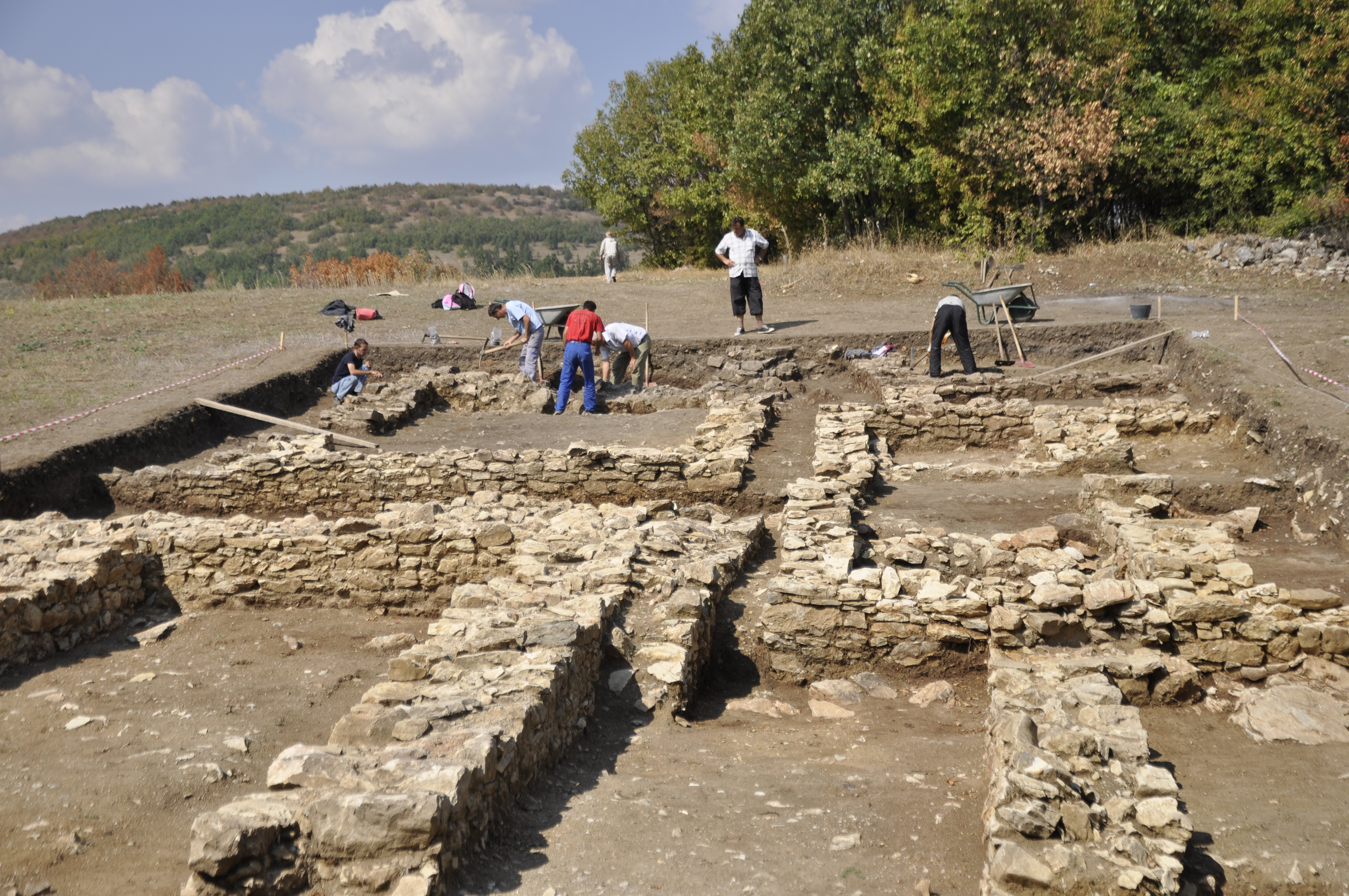
- 42°24′53″N 20°47′34″E
- Periods: Holocene
- Location: Kasterc, Suva Reka, Kosovo

Site notes
- Owner: Kosovo
- Public access: yes

The Kasterc Fortress site (Albanian: Kalaja e Kastercit) is an archeological site at the location of a former fortress in Kosovo.

== Overview ==
The archaeological site known as Kasterc, located approximately 12 kilometers to the northwest of Theranda, reveals a complex history spanning various epochs. It has been a significant center of archaeological interest, with its origins tracing back to the prehistoric era, specifically the Copper Age when it served as a fortified settlement. Subsequently, during the reign of Emperor Justinian, it underwent transformation and was reconfigured into a formidable stronghold. In the medieval period, the site took on a different role, serving as a necropolis.

The exploration of this fortress has been carried out through three distinct phases of archaeological research. In 1986, initial investigations were conducted, providing a broad overview of the site. This was followed by further archaeological excavations in 2010 and 2011, which unearthed an area covering approximately 500 m^{2} (5,400 sq ft). These excavations yielded remarkable discoveries, including the remnants of an early Christian church and an array of valuable movable archaeological artifacts. Among the findings were iron working tools, pottery, jewelry such as earrings and bracelets, as well as coins, offering valuable insights into the historical significance of Kasterc throughout its diverse periods of occupation.

== See also ==
- List of fortifications in Kosovo
