= Bare, Leposavić =

Bare
- Village
- Location in Kosovo
- Location: Kosovo
- District: Mitrovica
- Municipality: Leposaviq

Population (2024)
  - Total: 38
- Time zone: UTC+1 (CET)
  - Summer (DST): UTC+2 (CEST)
- Area code: +383

Bare (Albanian definite form: Barja, Serbian Cyrillic: Баре) is a village in Leposavić, northern Kosovo. It is inhabited by an ethnic Albanian majority.
