= Korroticë e Epërme =

Korroticë e Epërme Gornja Koretica
- Village
- Location in Kosovo
- Location: Kosovo
- District: Pristina
- Municipality: Glogovac

Population (2024)
  - Total: 1,158
- Time zone: UTC+1 (CET)
  - Summer (DST): UTC+2 (CEST)

Gornja Koretica (Serbian Cyrillic: Горња Коретица) or Korroticë e Gllogocit (in Albanian) is a village in the municipality of Glogovac in central Kosovo. It is a rural settlement of the scattered type, situated at the foothill of Goleš (1018 m), on 610–640 m height, 5 km southeast from Glogovac. The cadastral area is 849 hectares. The village population economy is plowing and cattle-raising (24,26% agricultural). A quarry is located in the village.

== History ==
=== Kosovo War ===
On 28 August 1998 during the Kosovo War, there was an armed clash in Korroticë, which the KLA successfully defended and inflicted significant losses on the Serbian forces. KLA fighter Halil Pecani was wounded during the clash.

One month later during an offensive in Drenica, the village was surrounded by Serbian forces on 25th September and six of the KLA fighters there had fallen leading to the Temporary Yugoslav occupation of Korroticë.

== Notable people ==
- Haradin Bala (1957-2018), a KLA commander convicted for war crimes, was born in the village.
