= Braboniq =

Braboniq Brabonjić
- Village
- Location in Kosovo
- Coordinates: 42°50′39″N 20°47′39″E
- Location: Kosovo
- District: Mitrovicë
- Municipality: Mitrovicë

Population (2024)
  - Total: 731
- Time zone: UTC+1 (CET)

Braboniq (in Albanian: Brabanik) or Brabonjić (in Serbian: Брабоњић) is a village in the municipality of Mitrovica in the District of Mitrovica, Kosovo. According to the 2011 census, it had 1,023 inhabitants, all of whom were Albanian.

== Notable people ==
- Kadri Veseli, Kosovar politician and one of the founders the UÇK
- Dan Derovci, Kachak fighter
