= Pirç, Mitrovica =

Pirç Pirče
- Village
- Location in Kosovo
- Coordinates: 42°50′3″N 20°52′11″E
- Location: Kosovo
- District: Mitrovicë
- Municipality: Mitrovicë

Population (2024)
  - Total: 468
- Time zone: UTC+1 (CET)
  - Summer (DST): UTC+2 (CEST)
- Postal code: 40000
- Area code: +381 28
- Car plates: 02

Pirç (in Albanian) or Pirče (in Serbian; Пирче) is a village in the municipality of Mitrovica in the District of Mitrovica, Kosovo. According to the 2024 census, it had 468 inhabitants, 466 of whom were Albanians.
