= List of people from Mitrovica, Kosovo =

The following are notable people who were either born, raised, are originally from or have lived for a significant period of time in Mitrovica, Kosovo.

== List ==
=== Politics ===
- Agim Bahtiri, former mayor
- Ramadan Çitaku, Albanian politician
- Xhafer Deva, Albanian politician
- Adnan Dibrani, Kosovan-Swedish politician
- Ferhat Bey Draga, Albanian politician
- Nexhip Draga, Albanian politician
- Sadri Ferati, Kosovan politician
- Bedri Hamza, Kosovan politician and former mayor
- Adrijana Hodžić, Kosovan politician
- Aleksandar Jablanović, Kosovan politician
- Ljubomir Marić]], Kosovan and Serbian politician
- Rexhep Mitrovica, Prime Minister of Albania's government under Nazi Germany.
- Armend Muja, Kosovan politicians
- Besim Muzaqi, Kosovan politician
- Vjosa Osmani, Kosovan politician and president of Kosovo
- Faton Peci, Kosovan politician and current mayor
- Goran Rakić, Kosovan politician
- Bajram Rexhepi, Kosovan politicians
- Igor Simić, Kosovan politician
- Avni Spahiu, Kosovan politicians
- Ali Shukrija, Yugoslav politician
- Arian Tahiri, Kosovan politician
- Sulejman Ugljanin, Ethnic Bosniak politician from Serbia
- Ilija Vakić, Yugoslav politician
- Kadri Veseli, Kosovan politician
- Sherif Voca, Albanian politician

=== Military ===
- Shemsi Ahmeti, KLA commander
- Bislim Bajgora, Balli Kombëtar adjutant
- Isa Boletini, Albanian revolutionary
- Milan Mojsilović, Chief of General Staff of the Serbian Armed Forces
- Bogdan Radenković, Politician and activist
- Emin Xhinovci, KLA soldier

=== Sports ===
- Valon Behrami, Swiss footballer
- Rron Broja, Kosovan footballer
- Drilon Hajrizi, Kosovan basketball player
- Muharrem Jashari, Kosovan footballer
- Miloš Krasić, Serbian footballer
- Alfred Llazari, Kosovan handball coach
- Riza Lushta, Albanian footballer
- Alban Meha, Albanian footballer
- Dušan Miletić (born 1998), Serbian basketball player
- Arbnor Muja, Albanian footballer
- Bujar Pllana, Albanian footballer
- Rafet Prekazi, Kosovan football coach
- Xhevat Prekazi, Yugoslav footballer
- Rezar, former professional wrestler
- Arbër Zeneli, Kosovan footballer

=== Music ===
- Melinda Ademi, Kosovar–American singer
- Vedat Ademi, Albanian singer
- Elai, Albanian rapper
- Butrint Imeri, Kosovan singer
- MC Kresha, Albanian rapper
- Rona Nishliu, Albanian singer
- Vullnet Sefaja, Albanian singer
