= Kaçandoll =

Kaçandoll or Kaçanoll may refer to:

- Kaçandoll (village), a village in Mitrovica, Kosovo
- Kaçandoll (river), a river in northeastern Kosovo
