= Shemsi Ahmeti =

Kosovo Liberation Army commander (1969–1999)

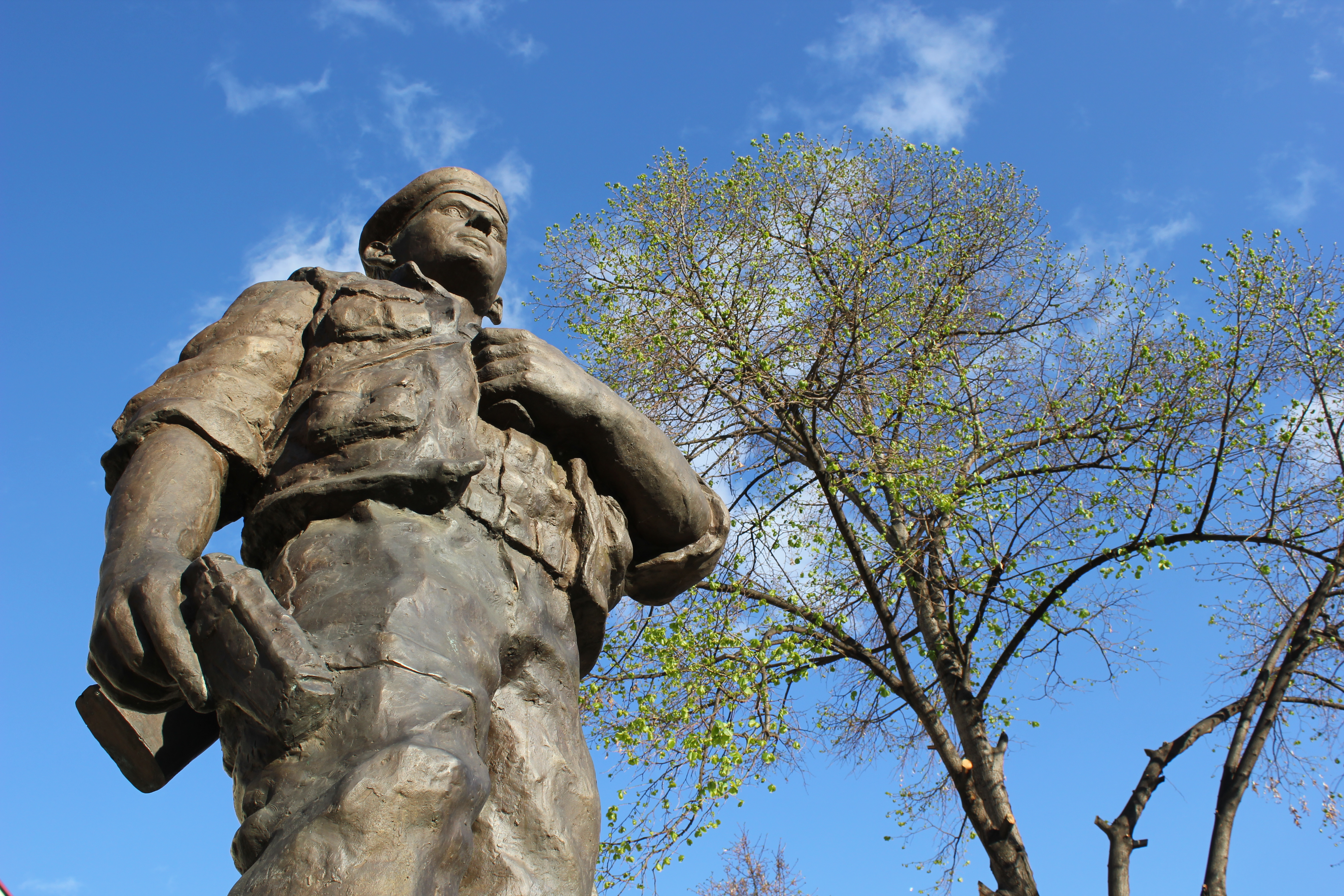
- Statue of Shemsi Ahmeti Mitrovica, Kosovo
- Born: 8 June 1969; Kodër, Mitrovica, AP Kosovo, SFR Yugoslavia (now Kosovo)
- Died: 26 April 1999 (aged 29); Melenicë, Kosovo, Kosovo, FR Yugoslavia (now Kosovo)
- Military career
- Allegiance: Yugoslavia; Kosova
- Branch: Yugoslav Ground Forces; Kosovo Liberation Army
- Service years: 1990–1992; 1998–1999
- Rank: Military Commander
- Nickname: Komandant Shemi
- Unit: 141th Brigade
- Commands: Kosovo Liberation Army (UÇK) ZOSH Special Units
- Conflicts: Croatian War of Independence: Battle of Vukovar; Bosnian War; Kosovo War: Battle of Mazhiq; Battle of Melenicë †
- Awards: Hero of Kosovo (posthumously)

Shemsi Ahmeti (8 June 1969 – 26 April 1999) also known with nickname Komandant Shemi, was an Albanian commander of the Kosovo Liberation Army (KLA), an ethnic Albanian paramilitary organization that sought the independence of Kosovo from Serbia. After the war, he was declared Hero of Kosovo.

== Biography ==
=== Early life ===
Shemsi Arif Ahmeti was born on 8 June 1969 in the village of Kodër (Zasella), Mitrovica in the region Shala e Bajgorës. He was born into large and poor Albanian family having six siblings. He finished his school in the neighboring village Shupkovc. In 1982, he became part of military high school in Beograd and finished it 1984 in Sarajevo. In 1990, he finished the artillery school in Zadar.

=== Activity in the Croatian and Bosnian war ===
During the Croatian War of Independence he served for the Yugoslav People's Army in the Battle of Vukovar. He also was involved in the Bosnian War. In those years, Ahmeti became an experienced soldier and artillery commander. In 1992, he decided to leave the Yugoslav Army because he understood the Yugoslav plans and tactics so he would rather help his own people instead of fighting against his ideology. He lived in the exile in Kosovo until the Kosovo War.

=== Kosovo War ===
On 22 June 1998, he was mobilized by the UÇK in the region Shala e Bajgorës. On 26 April 1999, he was named as the commander of the special units in the ZOSH (Zona Operative e Shalës). He commanded several operations like in Mazhiq, Trepçë, Melenicë, Rahovë or Majdan. The most notable operation was in Kutlloc on the 21–22 March 1999 where he succeeded to capture a Serbian military base with plenty munition and weapons. Only four days later he was killed by the Serbian Army in the battle of Melenicë. The battle lasted more than 46 days and was one of the most notable UÇK battles.

== Legacy ==
After the Kosovo War, a statue of him was built in the center of his hometown. In addition, one of the main streets in Mitrovica bears his name and the primary school in Shupkovc.
