= Carraleva =

Mountain in Kosovo

- Crnoljeva
- Location within Kosovo Location within Europe

Highest point
- Elevation: 1,055 m (3,461 ft)
- Coordinates: 42°27′00″N 20°53′00″E

Naming
- Native name: Carralevë (Albanian); Црнољева (Serbian)

Geography
- Country: Kosovo

Carraleva (Albanian indefinite form: Carralevë) or Crnoljeva (Serbian Cyrillic: Црнољева) is a mountain in central Kosovo, dividing its two main geographical regions, the Kosovo Plain and Dukagjin. Carraleva is also a point where all three drainage basins of Kosovo (and three out of four in the Balkans) meet, making the mountain a major hydrographic knot. It is named after the village of Carraleva.

Carraleva is located in the south-central part of Kosovo, between the valleys of the rivers Drenica (to the east) and Mirusha and Toplluha (to the west). The mountain is elongated in the north–south direction and divides the Prizren Depression of Metohija from the Drenica region of the Kosovo Plain. The highest peak is Topila (1,177 m), while the Drmanska Glava peak (926 m) is point of the hydrographic knot. Another prominent peak is the Korenik (1,142 m).

Carraleva is rich in ores, most notably the chromium, magnesite and coal. Right through the middle of the mountain goes the regional Ferizaj–Prizren road, using the natural route of the Carraleva river valley.

Some rivers originating from the mountain are:

- Drenica, Topila and Carraleva; through the Sitnica they drain the area into the Black Sea;
- Nerodimka; through the Lepenac it drains the area into the Aegean Sea;
- Banja, Mirusha and Toplluha; through the White Drin they drain the area into the Adriatic Sea;

Larger settlements around the Carraleva are Shtime (east), Suva Reka, Bllacë, Banja, Malisheva (west), Llapushnik, Komoran (north) and Carraleva (east).

The mountain is the place of a battle between Albanian rebels and Ottoman forces in 1910, that is known as the Battle of Carraleva Pass.

== See also ==
- Geography of Kosovo
- Mountains in Kosovo
