= Bajgora (disambiguation) =

Bajgora is a village in Kosovo.

Bajgora may also refer to:

- Bislim Bajgora (c. 1900 – 1 March 1947), an Albanian nationalist and Axis collaborator during World War II
- Bajgora Wind Farm, in Kosovo
