= Ukshin Kovaçica =

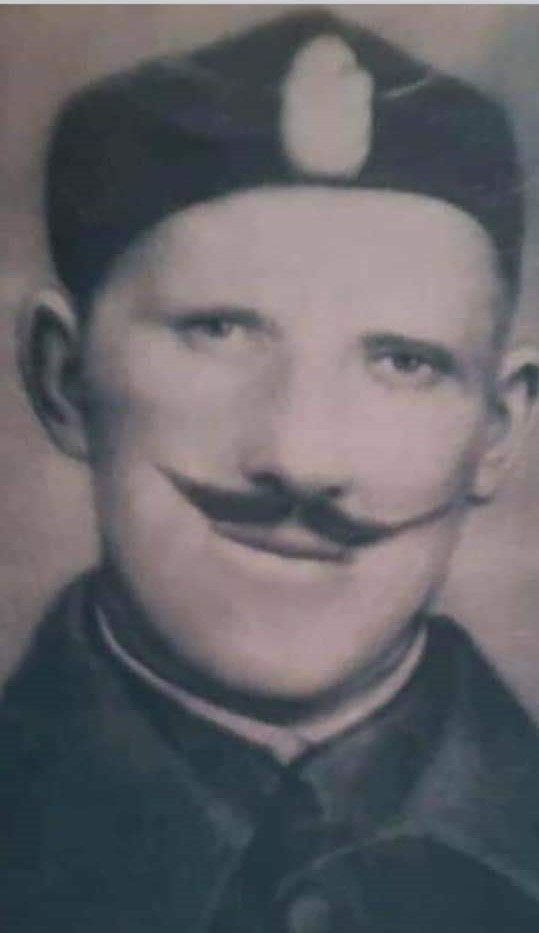
- Born: 1904; Bajgorë, Mitrovica, Ottoman Empire
- Died: 20 February 1947 (aged 42–43); Vllahia, Mitrovica, DF Yugoslavia
- Burial place: Bletaj, Vushtrri, Kosovo
- Military career
- Allegiance: Germany (1941–1944); Albania
- Service years: 1941–1947
- Rank: Commander
- Unit: Vullnetari
- Commands: Balli Kombëtar

Ukshin Nuhë Peci (1904 – 20 February 1947), known as Ukshin Kovaçica, was an Albanian nationalist and Balli Kombëtar commander in Kosovo during World War II. He was one of the most notable fighters in the region Shala e Bajgorës.

== Biography ==
=== Early life ===
Ukshin Kovaçica was born under the name Ukshin Peci in the village of Bajgorë but immediately after his birth his family moved to Kovaçicë and adopted the last name.

=== Military career ===
Following the Invasion of Yugoslavia in 1941, the Mitrovica region fell under German control. The Germans named Ukshin Kovaçica as the commander of the gendarmery in Karaçë, Gojbulja and Sllatinë. In October, 1944, he was also named the commander of Bare, Vesekofc and Rrëzhanë. Following the end of the Second World War, the Ballist in the region Shala e Bajgorës and other regions in Kosovo refused to surrender. The resistance against the communist forces went on. Ukshin Kovaçica had his own group which was the second largest after the group of Ahmet Selaci. In February, 1945, Ahmet Selaci's group was surrounded by the Partizan forces. Ukshin's group managed to help him leaving 36 Partizans dead. They were invited to be part of the Besa Kombëtare, an anticommunist organization in Kosovo, founded by Ymer Berisha. However, this was not possible because there was no assistance and the anticommunist forces were soon overwhelmed by the Yugoslav forces. In August 1946, the regions Shala e Bajgorës, Drenica, Llapi and Novi Pazar formed the Ibri Division where Ukshin was named the commander of the third group with vice–adjutant Smajl Svarça. According to Yugoslav sources, in the battle from his Kulla 45 soldiers were killed including one captain and one mayor and an estimated number of 200 soldier were declared missing.

=== Death ===
Ukshin Kovaçica was killed in a battle in Vllahia by the Yugoslav forces on the 20 February 1947.

== Legacy ==
Ukshin Kovaçica is widely regarded as a hero by ethnic Albanians. He and his Ballists were buried in the village Bletaj of Vushtrri.

Many streets were named after Ukshin Kovaçica like in Pristina, Mitrovica or Vushtrri. His village Kovaçicë is also known by the name Ukshinaj due to him.
