= Bajraku (peak) =

Mountain peak in Kosovo

Coordinates: 43.01848°N 21.01688°E

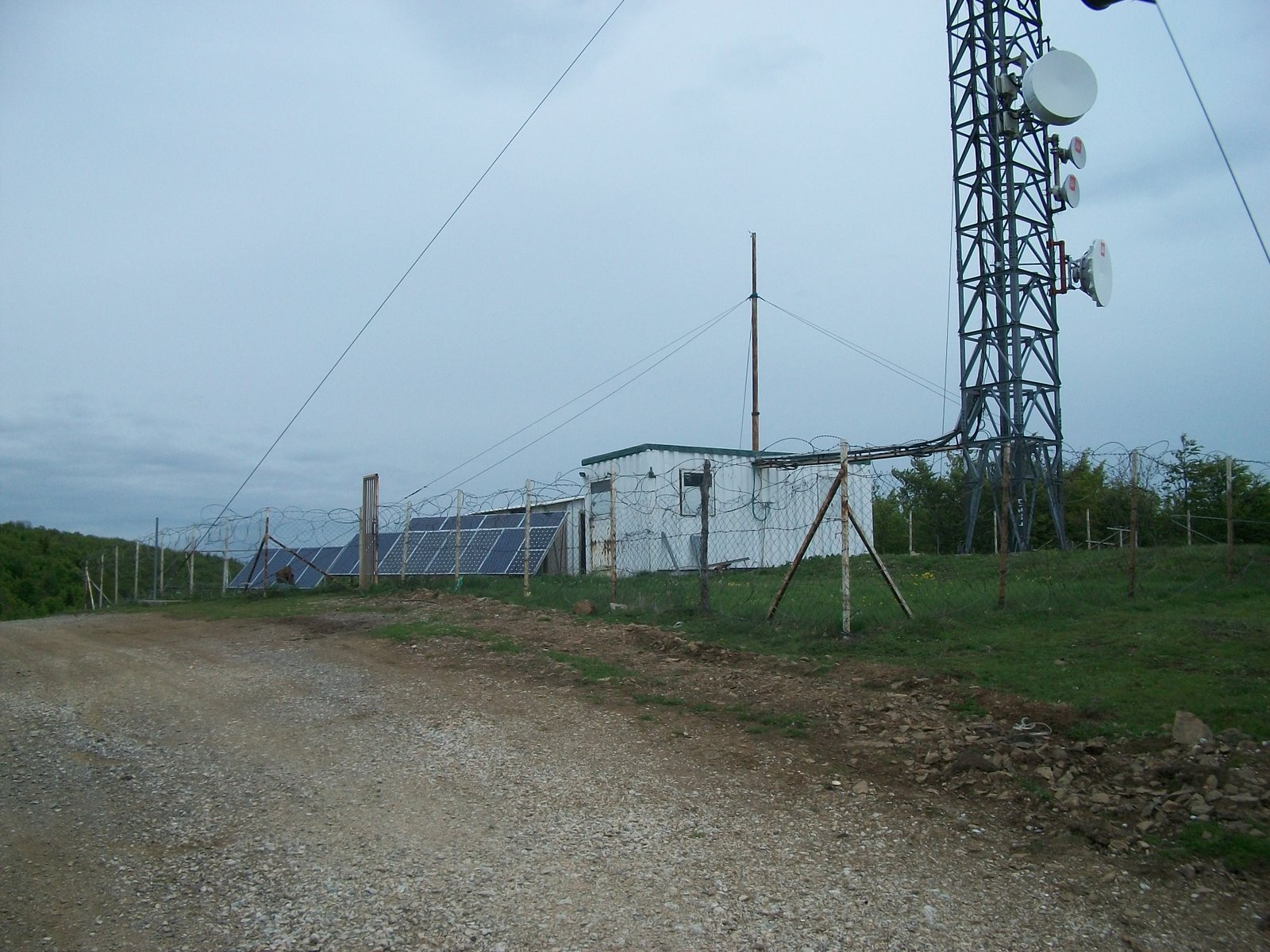

Highest point
- Elevation: 1,789 m (5,869 ft)

Geography
- Location: Kosovo
- Parent range: Kopaonik

Bajraku (Albanian: Bajrak lit. 'Flag'), also known as Maja e Mprehtë or Oštro koplje (Serbian: Оштро копље, which means "Sharp Spear") is the second highest mountain peak in the southern Kopaonik mountains in Kosovo, after Pančić's Peak. Because of its elevation, the 1,789 metres (5,869 ft) high mountain and its surroundings are treeless. To the south of the mountain are the large villages of Kaçandoll and Bajgora. Near the peak, the Kaçandoll river has its source.

== Gallery ==
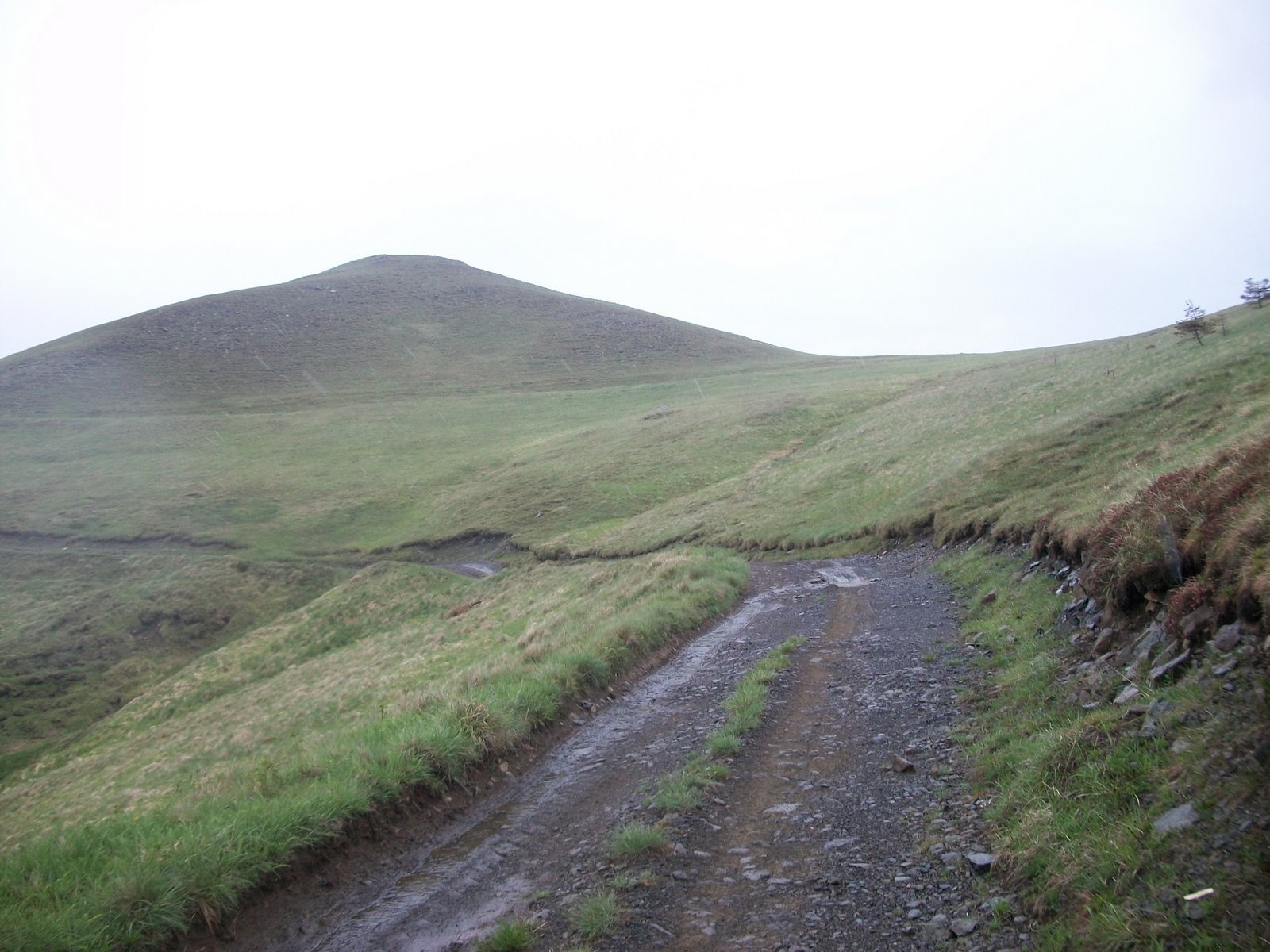

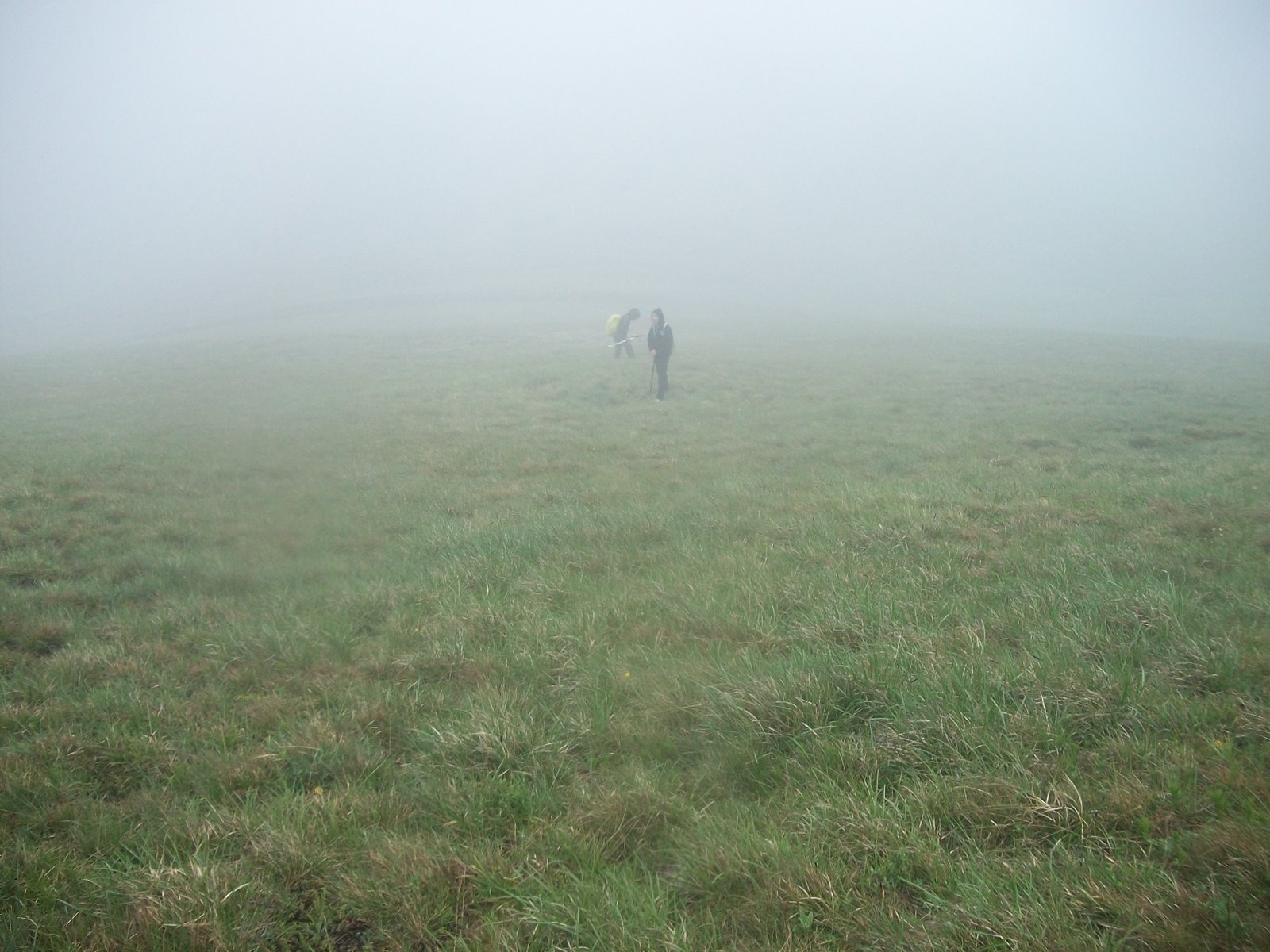

== See also ==
- Shala e Bajgorës
