= Voca =

Voca may refer to:

== Acronym ==
- Voice Output Communication Aid, a device to speak for someone who cannot speak
- Victims of Crime Act of 1984
- Amendments to the Victims of Crime Act under the USA PATRIOT Act, Title VI

== Surname ==
- Idriz Voca (born 1997), Kosovan footballer
- Sherif Voca (1893–1941) , Albanian politician from Kosovo

== Other uses ==
- Voca Limited, a former provider of payment services that merged with LINK to form VocaLink
- Voca, Texas, United States, an unincorporated community
