= Kaçandoll (river) =

River in Kosovo

Location
- Country: Kosovo

Physical characteristics
- Source
  - location: Kaçandoll, Mitrovicë, Kosovo
  - elevation: 1,376 metres (4,514 feet)
- Mouth
  - location: near Lupçi i Poshtëm, Podujevë, Kosovo
  - coordinates: 42.786311°N 21.152129°E
  - elevation: 553 metres (1,814 feet)
- Length: 32.5 km (20.2 mi)
- Basin size: 193.6 km^{2} (74.7 sq mi)
- Discharge
  - average: 1.03 m^{3}/s (36 cu ft/s)
  - maximum: 3.85 m^{3}/s (136 cu ft/s)

Basin features
- Progression: Llapi→Sitnica→ Ibar→ West Morava→ Great Morava→ Danube→ Black Sea

The Kaçandoll is a river in northeastern Kosovo. The river has a length of 32.5 kilometres (20.2 mi) and is a right tributary of the Llapi river.

== Overview ==
The river’s source is the confluence of two streams originating on the slopes of the Bajraku peak, at around 1,600 metres (5,200 ft) elevation. The Kaçandoll flows southwards, nourished by streams from the Kopaonik Mountains, and ultimately flows through its namesake village of Kaçandoll. In the village of Lupçi i Poshtëm, it flows into the Llapi River. Its basin size is 193.6 km^{2} (74.7 sq mi).

== Biodiversity ==
River trout (Salmo trutta fario) is found in the Kaçandoll waters.

== Hydroelectricity ==
There were plans to build a hydroelectric power station in the valley of the river, however the permit for this project was declined by the municipality of Podujevë in 2021. The hydroelectric power plant was planned to be built in 24 months and was expected to generate an energy of 6.08 GWh yearly.

== See also ==
- List of rivers of Kosovo
- Geography of Kosovo
