= Church of the Holy Trinity, Velika Reka =

Serbian Orthodox Church in Kosovo

Church of Holy Trinity Црква Свете Тројице у Великој Реци Kisha e Shën Trinisë në Lumadh

Religion
- Affiliation: Serbian Orthodox
- Year consecrated: 1997

Location
- Location: Lumadh, Kosovo

Church of Holy Trinity was a Serbian Orthodox Church located in the village of Lumadh/Velika Reka, in the municipality of Vushtrri, in Kosovo. It belonged to the Diocese of Raška and Prizren of the Serbian Orthodox Church.

The church was constructed in 1997 on the foundations of an older church that was built in 1926 by Serbian Colonel Milan Pribićević and his wife Ruža. Newly built church was founded and constructed by Dimitrije and Ljiljana Ljiljak.

On 20 June 1999 the church was razed.
