= List of rivers of Kosovo =

This is a list of rivers in Kosovo in an alphabetical order.

== List ==
| River | Image | Albanian | Serbian | Length |
|---|---|---|---|---|
| White Drin | | Drini i Bardhë | Beli Drim | 111.5 kilometres (69.3 mi) |
| Drenica | | Drenica | | 50 kilometres (31.1 mi) |
| Erenik | | Erenik | Erenik | 38 kilometres (23.6 mi) |
| Ibar | | Ibër | Ibar | 85 kilometres (52.8 mi) |
| Kaçandoll | | Kaçandoll | | 32.5 kilometres (20.2 mi) |
| Lepenac | | Lepenci | Lepenec | 50 kilometres (31.1 mi) |
| Llapi | | Llapi | Lab | 76.8 kilometres (47.7 mi) |
| Lumbardhi i Deçanit | | Lumbardhi i Deçanit | Dečanska Bistrica | —N/a |
| Lumbardhi i Pejës | | Lumbardhi i Pejës | Pećka Bistrica | 56 kilometres (34.8 mi) |
| Lumbardhi i Prizrenit | | Lumbardhi i Prizrenit | Prizrenska Bistrica | —N/a |
| Mirusha | | Mirusha | | 37 kilometres (23.0 mi) |
| Morava e Binçës | | Morava e Binçës | Binačka Morava | 67 kilometres (41.6 mi) |
| Nerodime | | Nerodimë | Nerodimka | —N/a |
| Sitnica | | Sitnicë | Sitnica | 110 kilometres (68.4 mi) |
