= Mazhiq Mosque =

Cultural heritage monument of Kosovo

The Mosque of Mazhiq Xhamia e Mazhiqit
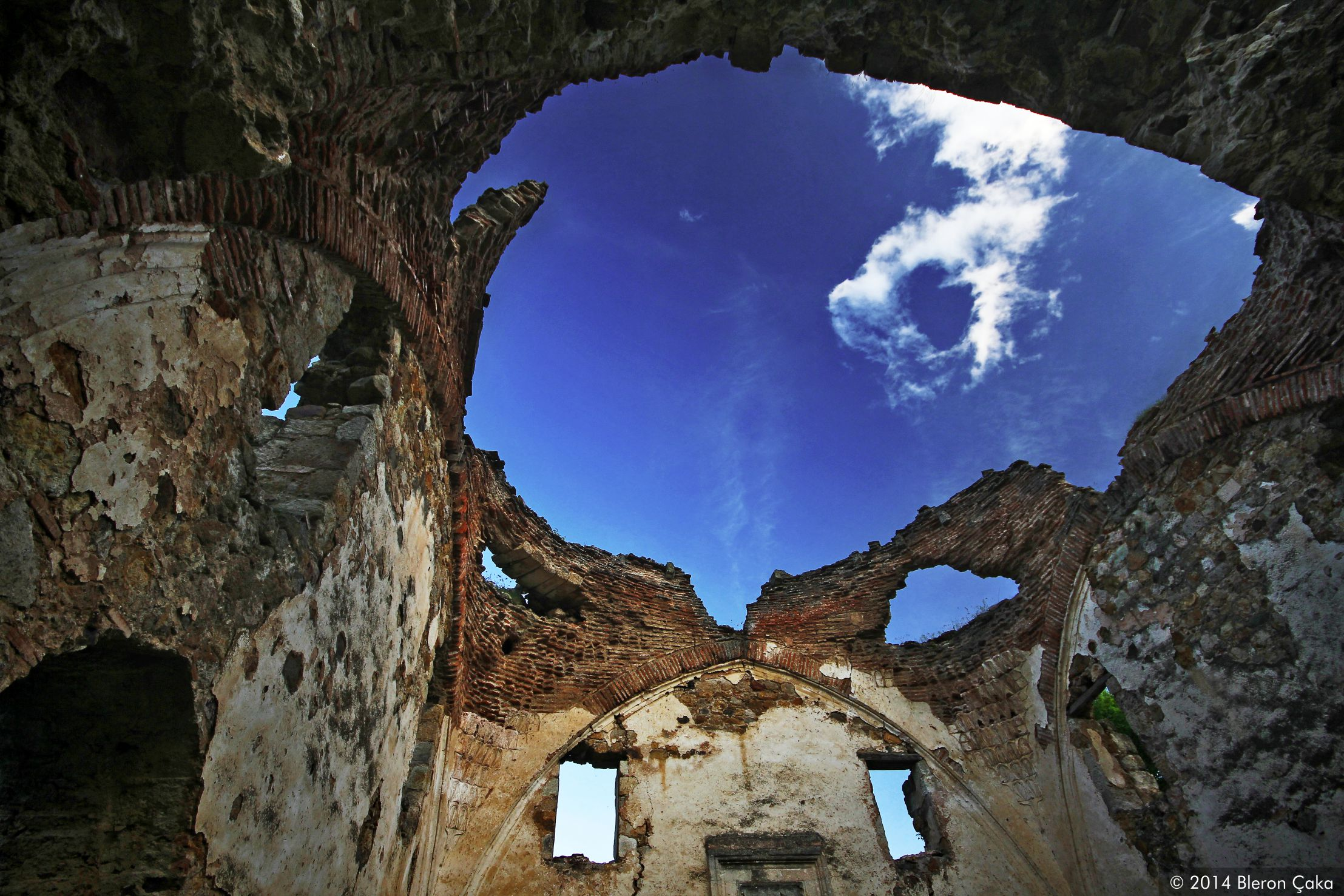

Religion
- Affiliation: Islam

Location
- Location: Mazhiq
- Country: Kosovo
- Interactive map of The Mosque of Mazhiq; Xhamia e Mazhiqit

Architecture
- Type: Mosque
- Completed: 15 century
- Cultural Heritage under Permanent Protection
- Official name: Xhamia e Mazhiqit
- Type: Architectural Heritage: Monument/Ensemble
- Criteria: Under Protection
- Reference no.: 4

The Mazhiq Mosque or the Mosque of Mazhiq is a cultural heritage monument of Kosovo, located 13 km (8 mi) from Mitrovica, in the village of Mazhiq. The mosque was built around the 15th century and today is almost fully destroyed, having lost its original function. This monument is classified as "architectural" and has been approved with the number 004 in the list of monuments of Kosovo. Together with St. Peter's Basilica Church in Stantërg, located around 2 km away and also in ruins, they stand as important religious and cultural landmarks in the region of Shala e Bajgorës.

== Overview ==
The mosque holds significant historical value, reflecting the rich cultural and architectural heritage of the area. Mazhiqi Mosque features traditional Islamic architectural elements, with a focus on simplicity and functionality. Efforts are often made to preserve such historical sites to maintain their cultural and religious significance for future generations. The preservation of Mazhiqi Mosque involves maintaining its structural integrity and historical authenticity. Mazhiqi Mosque continues to be a vital part of the cultural and religious fabric of the village of Mazhiq, embodying both the historical legacy and the ongoing traditions of the local Muslim community.

Mazhiqi Mosque features traditional Islamic architectural elements, with a focus on simplicity and functionality. The design typically includes:

- Prayer Hall: A spacious area for worshipers to gather and pray.
- Minaret: A tall, slender tower from which the call to prayer is announced.
- Dome: A distinctive feature that often symbolizes the heavens in Islamic architecture.

== See also ==
- Shala e Bajgorës
- Monuments in Mitrovica
