= Sazli =

Sazli Sazli or Sazlia (Albanian)
- Village
- Location within Kosovo
- Coordinates: 42°24′26.23″N 21°11′0.98″E
- Country: Kosovo
- District: Ferizaj
- Municipality: Ferizaj
- Elevation: 573.5 m (1,882 ft)

Population (2024)
  - Total: 724
- Time zone: UTC+1 (CET)
  - Summer (DST): UTC+2 (CEST)

Sazli is a village in the municipality of Ferizaj, Kosovo.

== Geography ==
The village of Sazli is located in the northeast of this municipality. It is considered the source of the Sitnica river, the river that passes through the village of Sazli is called Sazli river and then later into Sitnica.
