= Kaçandoll (village) =

- Village
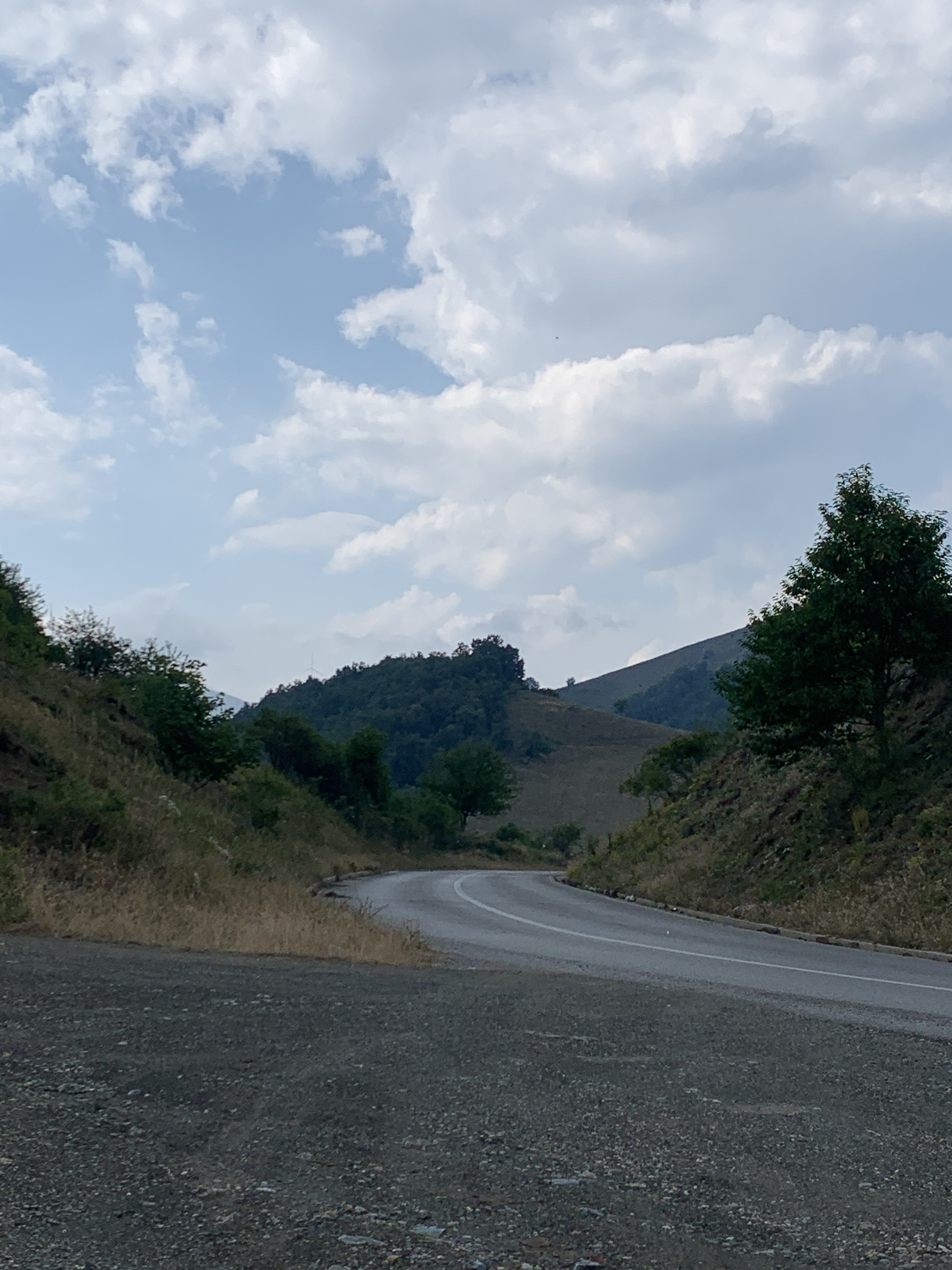
- The R-129 in Kaçandoll which connects Mitrovicë and Besianë

- Location in Kosovo
- Coordinates: 42°58′27″N 21°04′01″E
- Location: Kosovo
- District: Mitrovicë
- Municipality: Mitrovicë

Population (2024)
  - Total: 33
- Time zone: UTC+1 (CET)
  - Summer (DST): UTC+2 (CEST)

Kaçandoll (in Albanian) or Kačandol (in Serbian) is a village in the municipality of Mitrovica in the District of Mitrovica, Kosovo. According to the 2024 census, it had 33 inhabitants, all of whom were Albanian.

== Geography ==
Like Bajgora, located to the west of Kaçandoll, it is in the south of the Kopaonik range and surrounded by steep mountains. Close to the village on its east side flows a tributary of the Llapi river, called the Kaçandoll river. From Kaçandoll, the whole Llapi region can be seen.

== History ==
The village was inhabited by ethnic Albanians, of the Shala tribe, which had settled here in the mid–18th century from the Shala region in northern Albania.

Albanian rebels (kachaks), active from 1918 to 1924, were disarmed by the Yugoslav government. The group included rebels from the village, which was at the time part of the Vushtrri srez (municipality).

Prior to 1978, it was also known as Kačan dol (Качан дол). It was then spelled Kačandol.

According to the 1991 census, the village had no inhabitants.

== See also ==
- Kaçanoll River
