= Trepça Crystal Museum =

Museum in Kosovo

Coordinates: 42.9392°N 20.9186°E

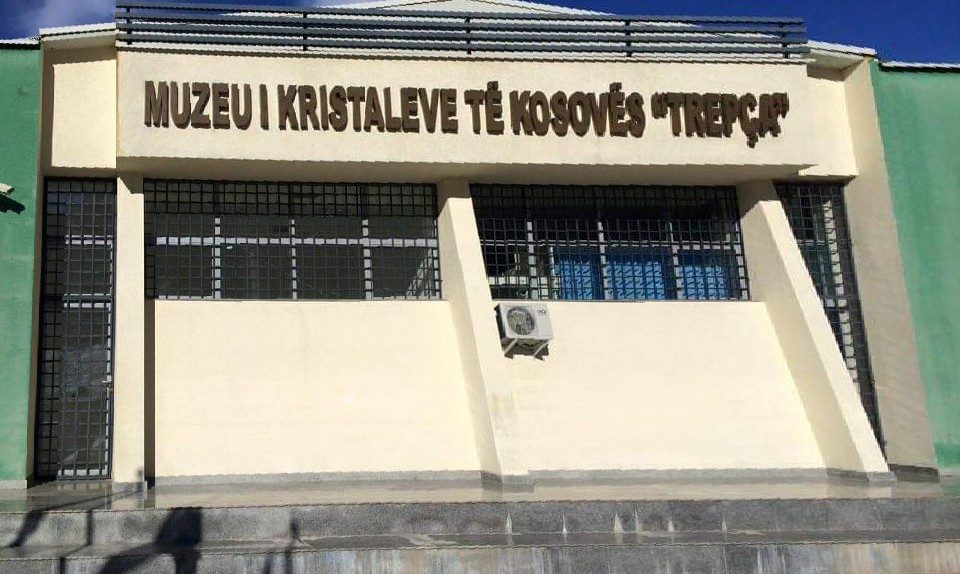
Trepça Crystal Museum

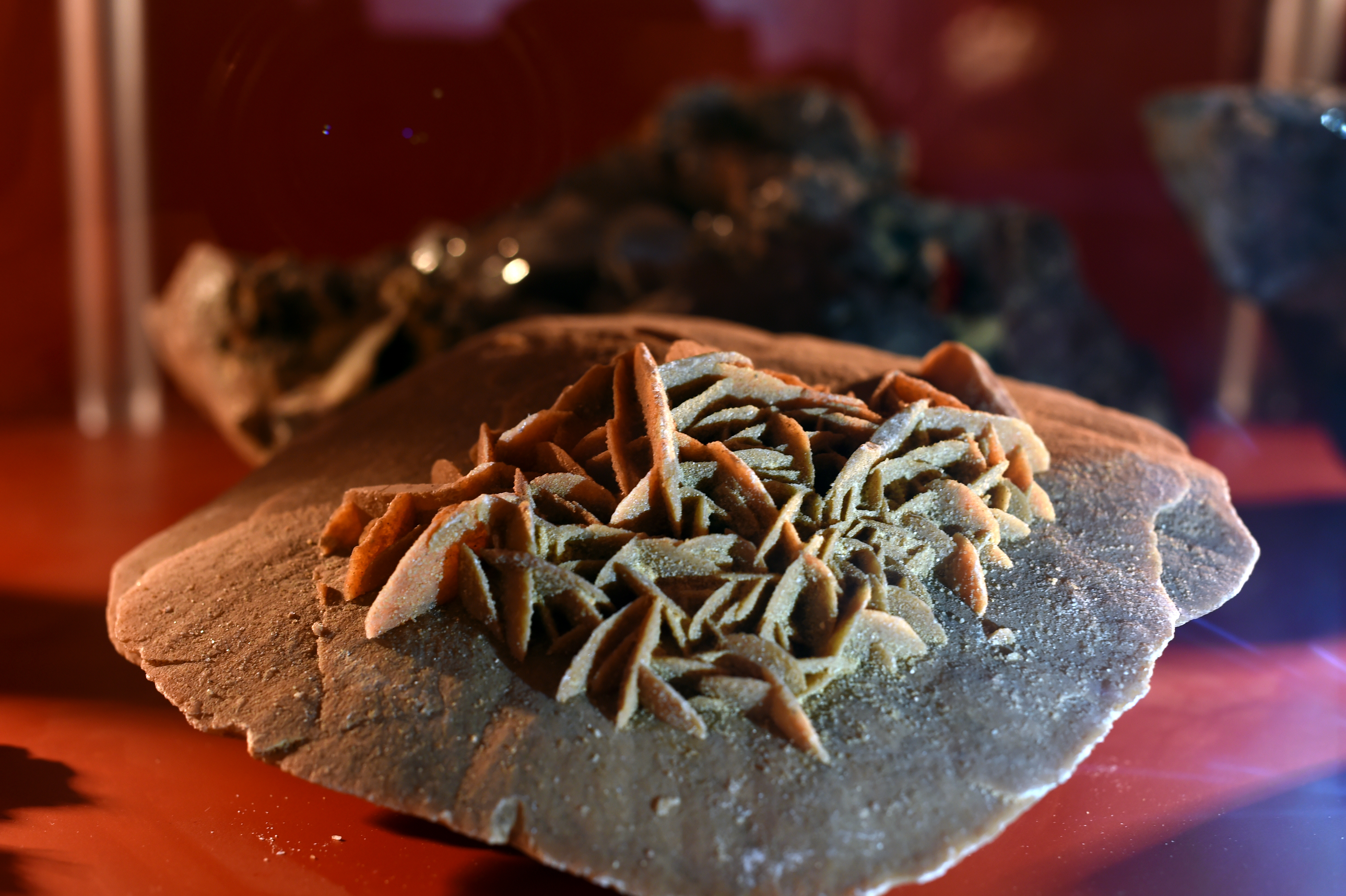
Crystals from Trepca Mines

The Trepça Crystal Museum is located in the town of Stantërg, near the Trepça Mines in Mitrovica, Kosovo. This museum is a treasure trove of crystals and minerals extracted from the depths of Kosovo. Its history dates back to 1964, when it was established with over 1,300 exhibits of various types of crystals, transforming the museum into an important national institution for Kosovo, both in terms of its value and its tourism appeal.

== History ==
In 1970, the Kosovo Institute for Nature Protection placed 512 crystals exhibited in the museum under protection, further enhancing its importance. From its inception, the museum was housed in a building that, due to its age, did not meet the conditions necessary for the proper display and preservation of the crystals. In 2012, with funds from the Government of the Republic of Kosovo and the enterprise, a modern building for the crystal museum was constructed, with an investment of around 560,000 euros. This new facility displays approximately 1,500 selected exhibits of crystals and minerals.

In addition to crystals from the Trepça Mine, the museum also exhibits over 100 types of crystals from various countries around the world, including Germany, Italy, France, Spain, and Brazil, which the museum acquired through exchanges for crystals from the Trepça Mines. The Trepça Crystal Museum is a valuable asset for Kosovo, carefully preserved, protected, and displayed for all visitors who wish to learn more about the beauty of crystals and minerals. In addition to crystals, the museum also displays old tools used by miners in the early days of the mining operations.

== See also ==
- Shala e Bajgorës
- City Museum of Mitrovica
