= Mazhiq =

Mazhiq Mažić
- Village
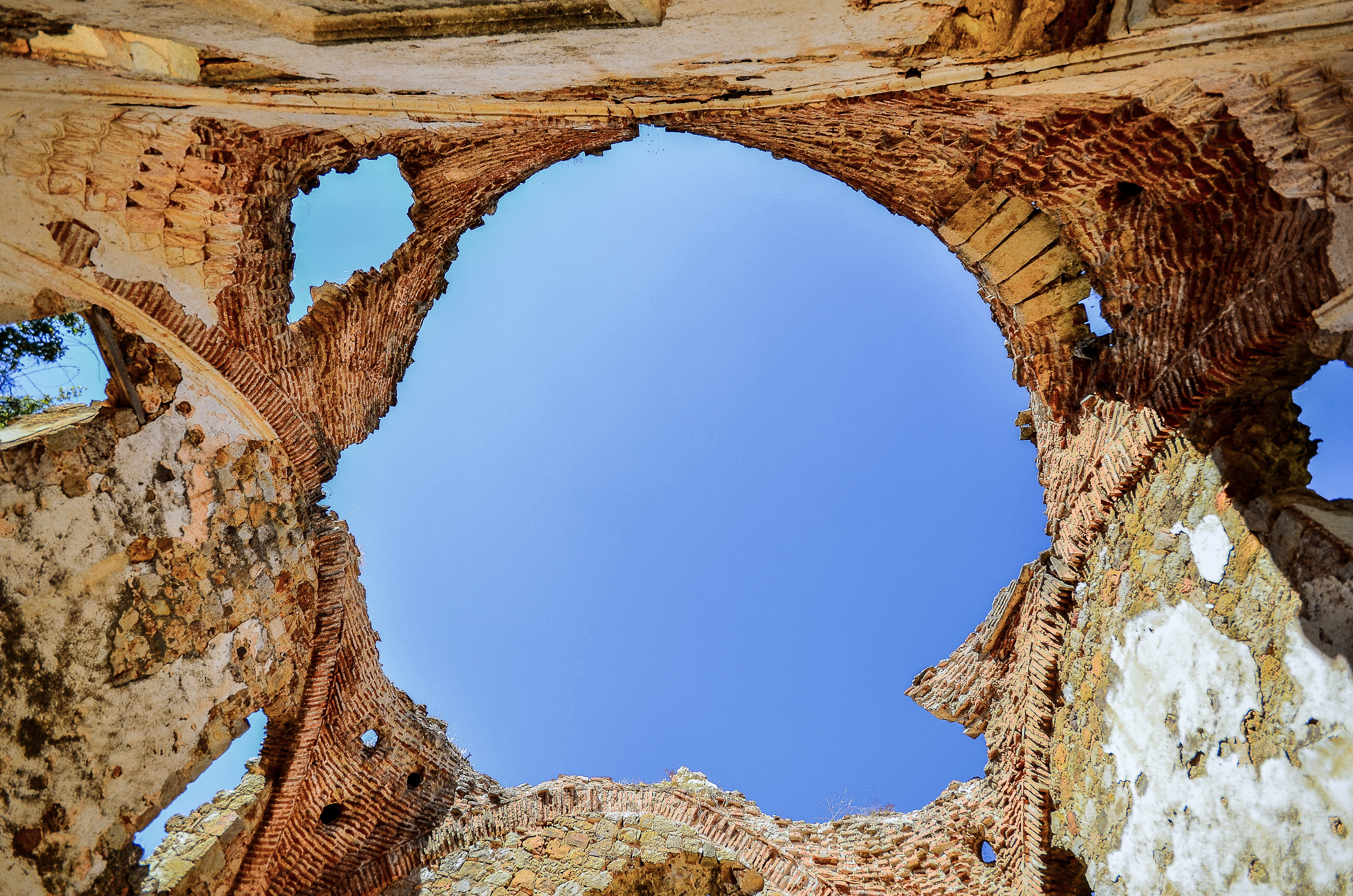
- The Mosque of Mazhiq, one of the oldest mosques in Kosovo

- Location in Kosovo
- Coordinates: 42°55′47″N 20°56′36″E
- Location: Kosovo
- District: Mitrovicë
- Municipality: Mitrovicë
- Elevation: 1,035 m (3,396 ft)

Population (2024)
  - Total: 90
- Time zone: UTC+1 (CET)
  - Summer (DST): UTC+2 (CEST)

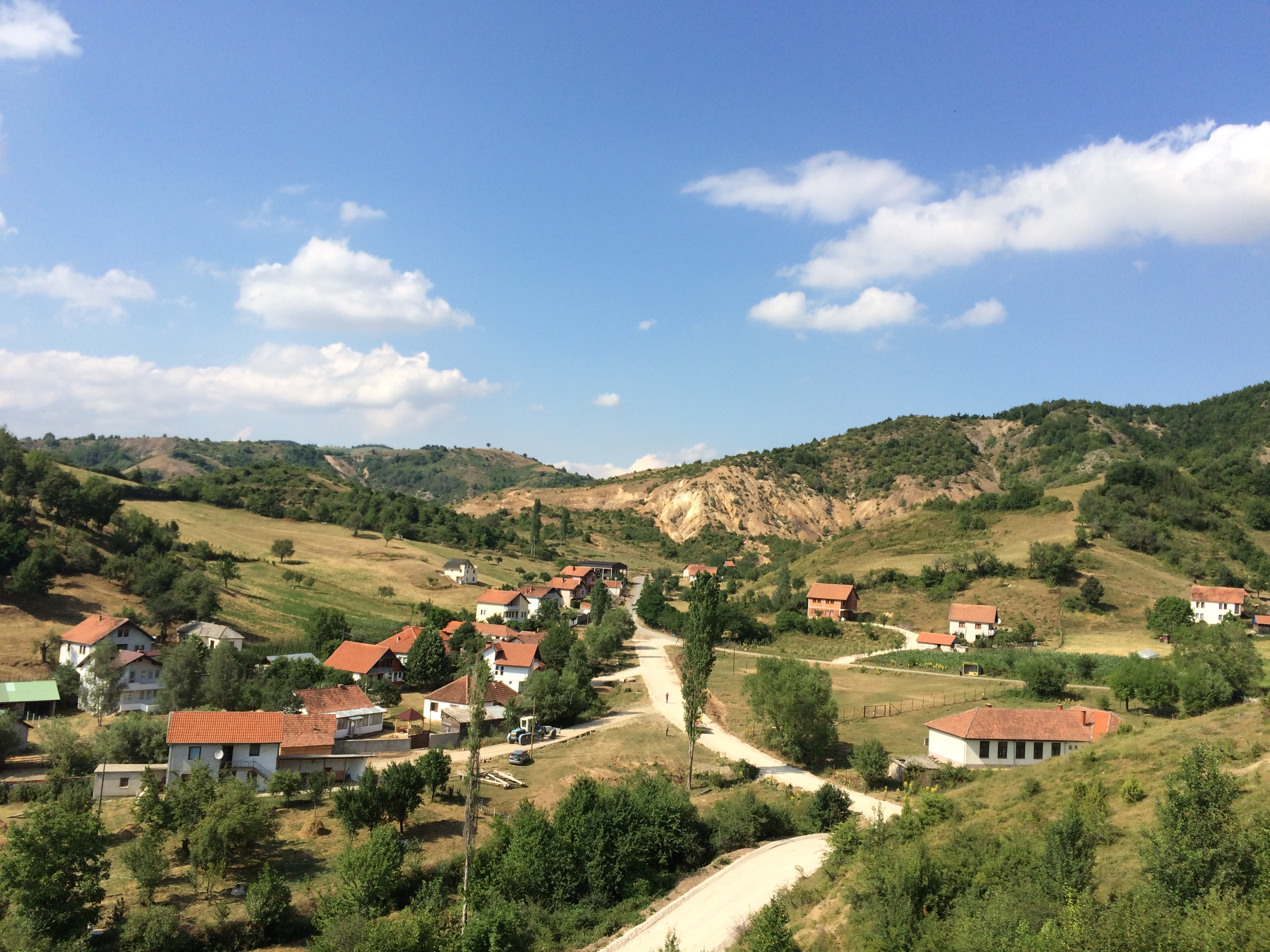
Mazhiq (2017)

Mazhiq (in Albanian) or Mažić is a village in the municipality of Mitrovica in the District of Mitrovica, Kosovo. According to the 2024 census, it has 90 inhabitants, all Albanians. Alternative names of the village are Mazaj,Mazet or Januzi.

== History ==
In the 16th century, the Mazhiqi Mosque was built in the north of the village. It was constructed by Muslihuddin Abdu’l-Gani and remains one of the oldest mosques in the country.

During the Kosovo War the brigade 141 "Mehë Uka" of the Kosovo Liberation Army operated in the region Shala e Bajgorës.

== See also ==
- Mazhiq Mosque
