= Kovaçicë =

Kovaçicë Kovaçica or Kovaçicë (Albanian) Ковачица/Kovačica (Serbian)
- Village
- Location in Kosovo
- Coordinates: 42°56′49″N 21°02′17″E
- Location: Kosovo
- District: Mitrovica
- Municipality: Mitrovica
- Elevation: 1,052 m (3,451 ft)

Population (2024)
  - Total: 2
- Time zone: UTC+1 (CET)
  - Summer (DST): UTC+2 (CEST)

Kovaçicë (Albanian: Kovaçica) or Kovačica (Serbian Cyrillic: Ковачица), is a village in the municipality of Mitrovica in the District of Mitrovica, Kosovo. According to the 2011 census, it has 27 inhabitants, all Albanians. An alternative name of the village is Ukshinaj.

== Tourism ==
A residential complex called Lama Hill is located in the village.

== Notable people ==
- Ukshin Kovaçica, Albanian nationalist

== See also ==
- Populated places in Kosovo
