= Zasella =

Zasella Zasela
- Village
- Location in Kosovo
- Coordinates: 42°53′51″N 20°54′8″E
- Location: Kosovo
- District: Mitrovicë
- Municipality: Mitrovicë
- Elevation: 837 m (2,746 ft)

Population (2024)
  - Total: 609
- Time zone: UTC+1 (CET)

Zasella or Kodër or is a village in the municipality of Mitrovica in the District of Mitrovica, Kosovo. According to the 2024 census, it had 609 inhabitants, all of whom were Albanian except one Bosniak.

== Notable people ==
- Shemsi Ahmeti, KLA commander
- Nezir Zasella (sq), Albanian guerilla fighter
