= Drenica (river) =

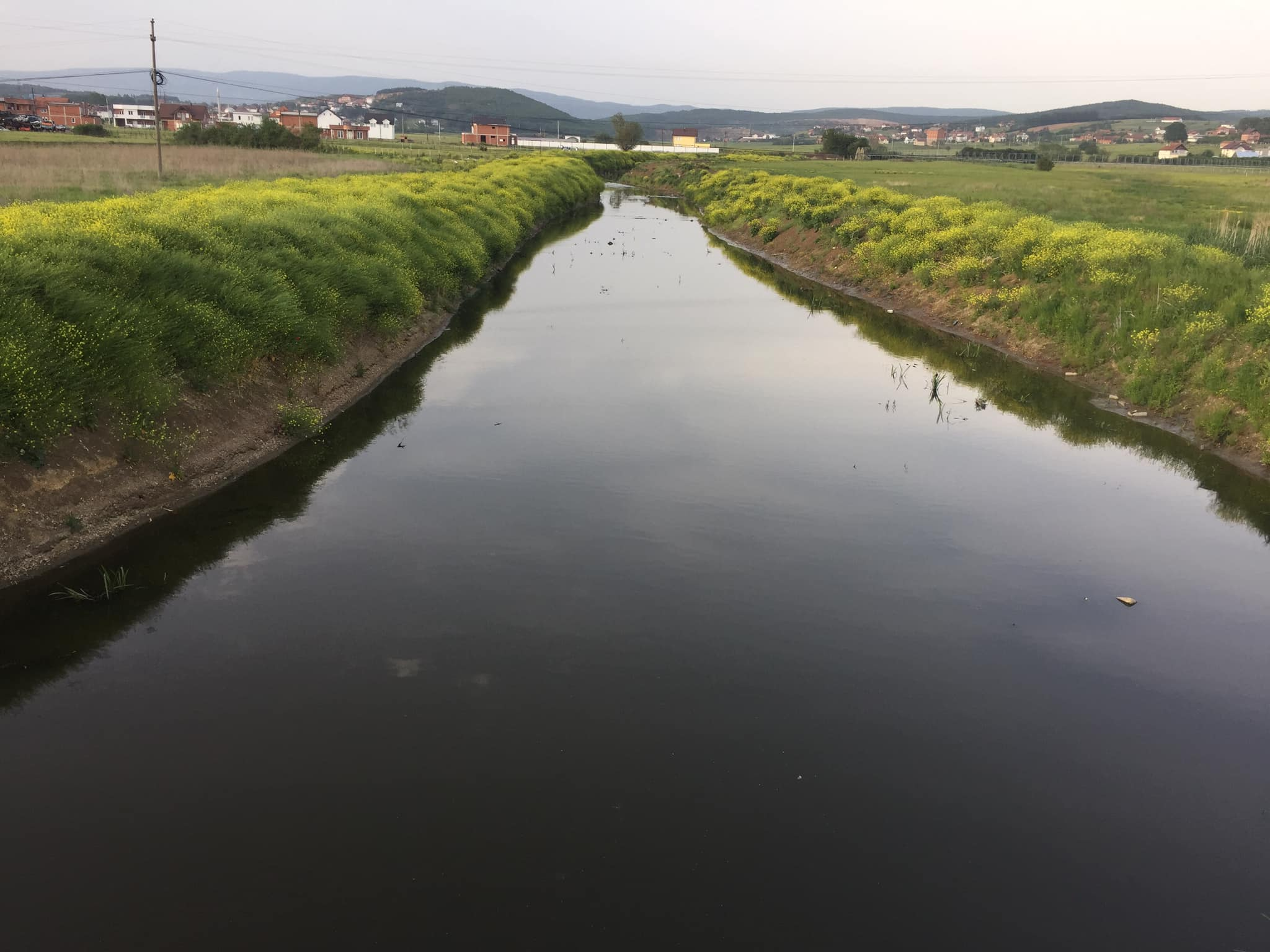

Location
- Country: Kosovo

Physical characteristics
- Source
  - location: Carraleva mountain, northwest of Shtime, Kosovo
- Mouth
  - location: Sitnica, southwest of Kosovo, Kosovo
  - coordinates: 42.6158°N 21.0686°E
- Length: 50 km (31 mi)
- Basin size: 447 km^{2} (173 sq mi)

Basin features
- Progression: Sitnica→ Ibar→ West Morava→ Great Morava→ Danube→ Black Sea

The Drenica (Albanian indefinite form: Drenicë, Serbian Cyrillic: Дреница) is a river in Kosovo, a 50 km (31 mi) long left tributary to the Sitnica river. It flows entirely within Kosovo and gives its name to the surrounding Drenica region.

== Overview ==
Originating from two streams in the northern part of Carraleva Mountain, beneath the Breshenc hill (1046 m), the Drenica river takes shape and it originally flows to the north. It is known as Llapushnik until it reaches Rusinovc village, where it enters the Drenica basin. Moving northwest of Poklek village, it enters the mountainous region via the Dobrosheve - Grabovc forest glen. Eventually, at Vragoli village, it merges with the Sitnica river.

The river's course is divided into three sections: the upper flow extends until Poklek, the middle flow spans from Poklek to Bardh i Madh, and the lower flow continues from there until it converges with the Sitnica river.

The Drenica basin experiences an annual average temperature of 9.6 °C (49.3 °F) and receives a median annual rainfall of 659.7 mm (25.97 in).

The Drenica belongs to the Black Sea drainage basin, drains an area of 447 km^{2} (173 sq mi) and it is not navigable.

== See also ==
- Drenica (region)
- List of rivers of Kosovo
