= City Museum of Mitrovica =

Museum in Kosovo

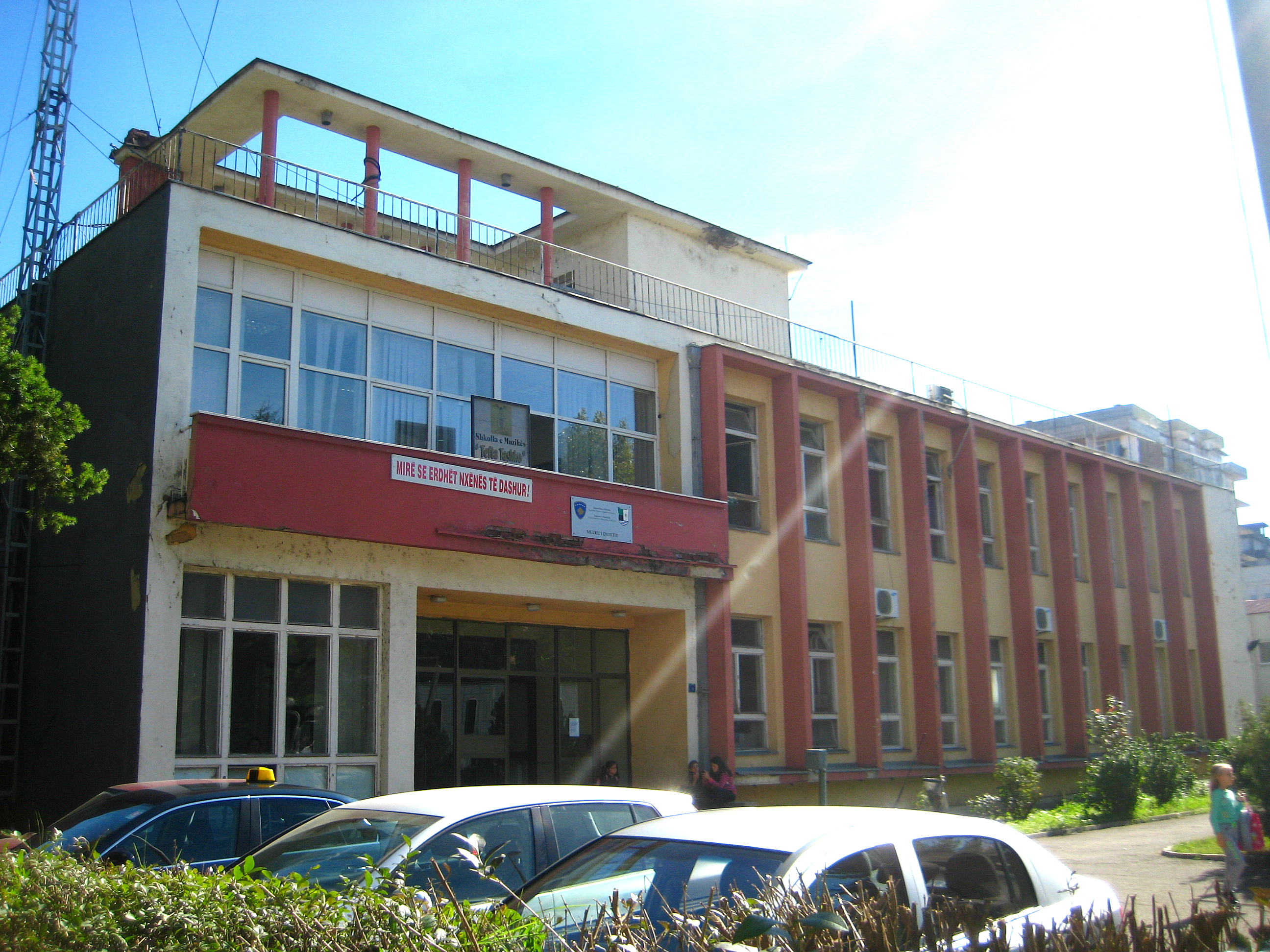
- The City Museum of Mitrovica
- Established: 1952
- Location: Mitrovica, Kosovo
- Coordinates: 42.89°N 20.87°E
- Director: Hajrullah Mustafa

The City Museum of Mitrovica (Albanian: Muzeu i qytetit të Mitrovicës) is a museum in Mitrovica, Kosovo, established in 1952. It is currently housed in the former Yugoslav Army House located in the city center.

The museum holds over 1,000 archaeological artifacts from different historical periods, dating back to the Illyrian civilization, and displays over 800 ethnological handiworks, representing the local diversity. The museum houses historical materials and documents and geological and numismatic collections among others.

The City Museum of Mitrovica organizes various of events and activities, including Mitro të dua (Mitro[vica], i love you), an annual event focused on the presentation and the digitization of cultural treasures of Mitrovica, with particular emphasis on the performing arts, initiating this way the foundation of contemporary art section within the museum.

== See also ==
- Trepça Crystal Museum
