= Lumadh =

- Location within Kosovo
- Coordinates: 42°45′24.32″N 21°1′31.06″E
- Country: Kosovo
- District: Mitrovica
- Municipality: Vushtrri

Population
  - Total: 1,017

Lumadh is a village in the municipality of Vushtrri, Kosovo. The village is the place where Llapi River joins Sitnica river. The village is inhabited by an ethnic Albanian majority.
