= Dukagjin =

Dukagjin or Dukagjini may refer to:

== Geography ==
- Another name for Metohija, a region in Kosovo
- Dukagjin Highlands, a mountainous region in northern Albania
- Dukagjin, a village in the municipality of Kukës, Albania
- Dukagjin(sq), a village in the municipality of Mat, Albania

== History ==
- Dukagjini family, a noble Albanian family from the Middle Ages
- Principality of Dukagjini, a principality in Albania in the Middle Ages

== Sport ==
- KF Dukagjini, a football club based in Klina, Kosovo

== Television ==
- RTV Dukagjini, a private national broadcaster based in Kosovo
