= Shala e Bajgorës =

Geographic region in Kosovo

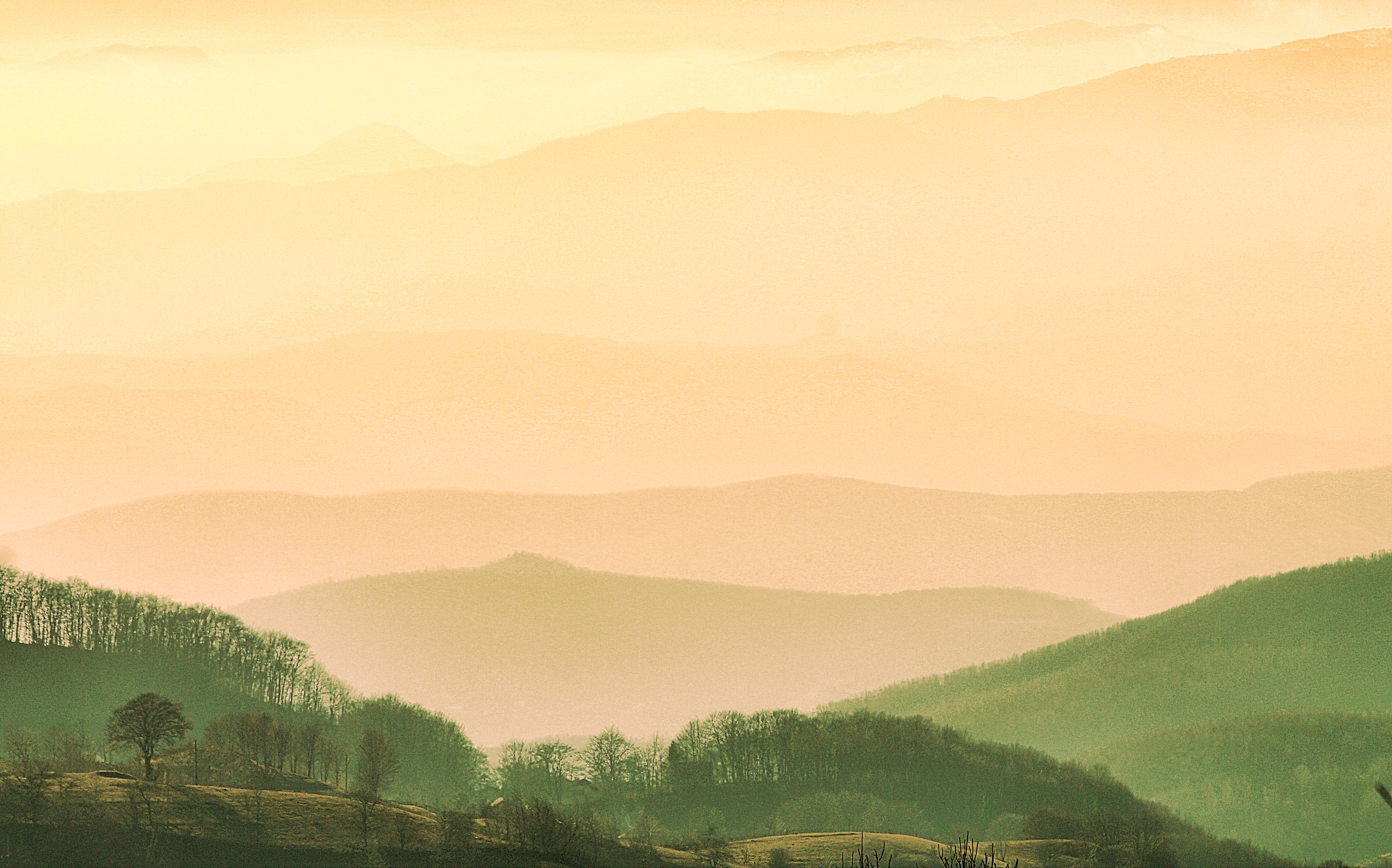
Shala e Bajgorës

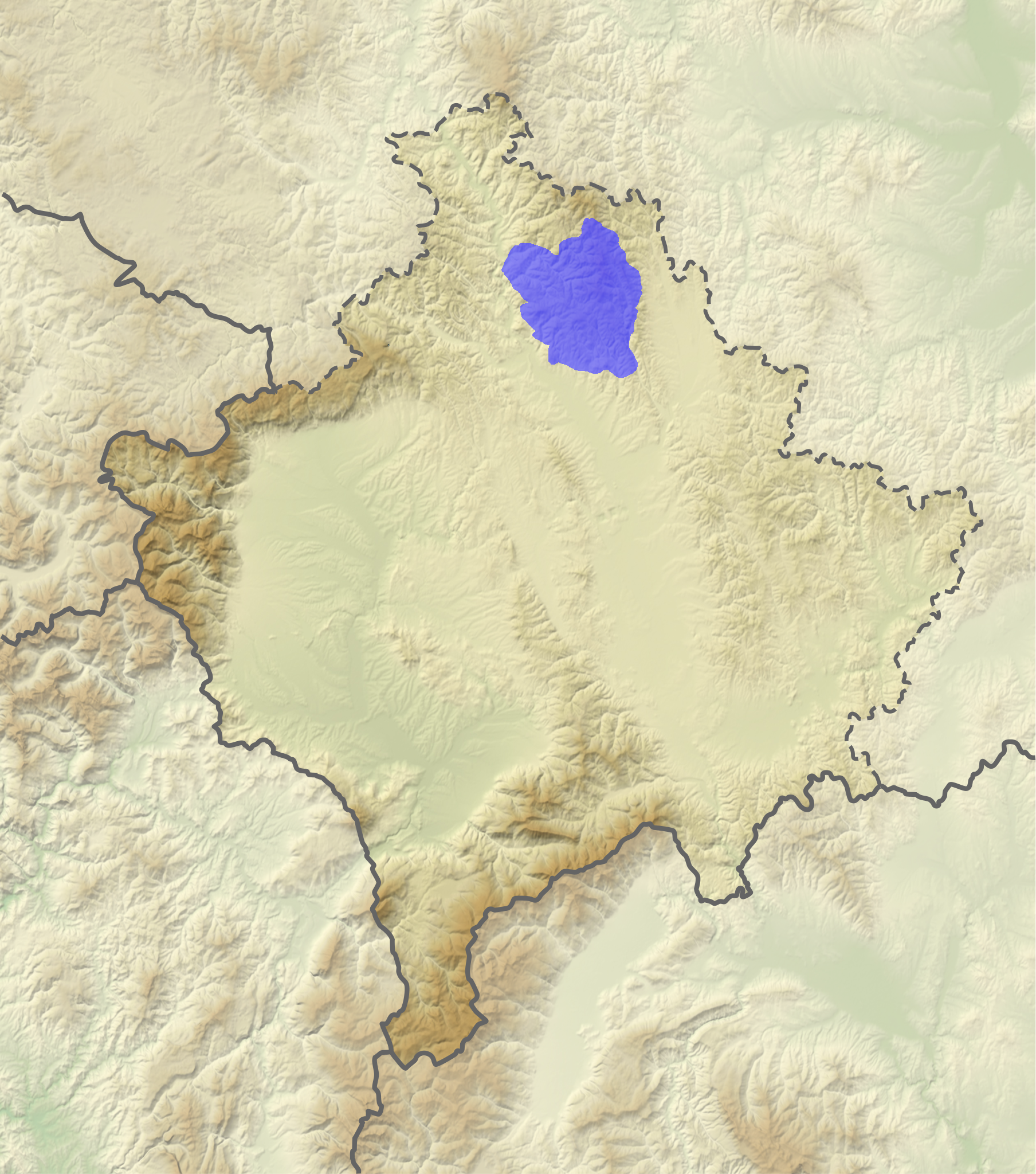
Location of Shala e Bajgorës within Kosovo

Shala e Bajgorës is a mountainous (hilly) region in Kosovo, that lies between the valley of the river Ibar and Llap, at the foot of the Kopaonik, concentrated primarily around cities, Mitrovica, Vushtrri, Podujevë and Zveçan, and town like Stantërg (Trepça Mines), with village of Bajgora being the largest of their 54 settlements.

== Notable people ==
- Rahim Ademi, retired Croatian Army general
- Shemsi Ahmeti, UÇK commander
- Bislim Bajgora, adjutant for the Balli Kombëtar
- Isa Boletini, Albanian revolutionary commander and politician
- Ukshin Kovaçica, commander of the Vullnetari
- Mehë Uka, political activist
- Sherif Voca, Albanian nationalist

== See also ==
- Bajgora
- Shala (tribe)
- Mazhiq Mosque
- Trepça Crystal Museum
- St. Peter's Basilica Church, Stari Trg
