= Vllahia =

Vllahia Vlahinje
- Village
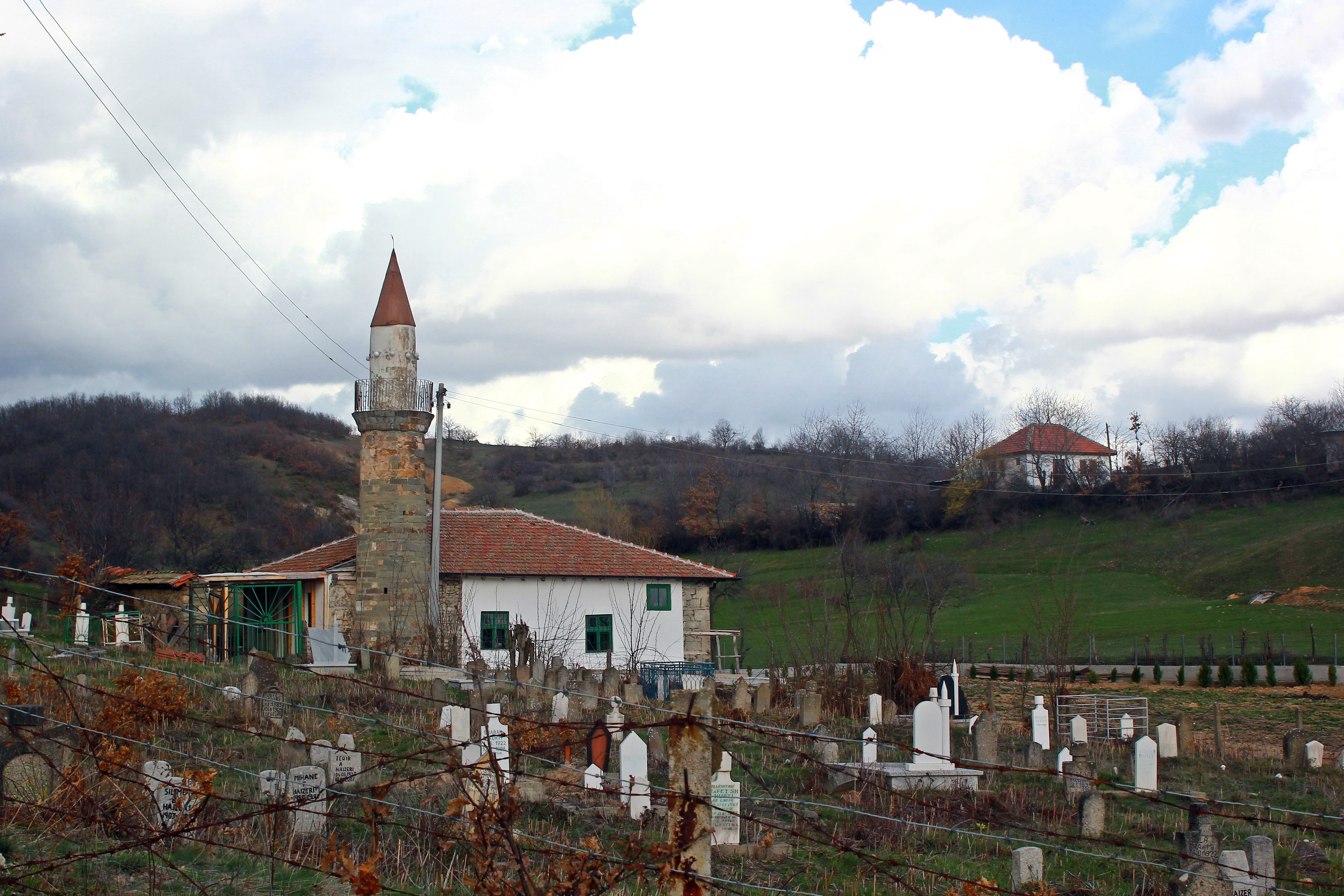
- The Mosque of Vllahi

- Location in Kosovo
- Coordinates: 42°58′7″N 20°52′33″E
- Location: Kosovo
- District: Mitrovicë
- Municipality: Mitrovicë

Population (2024)
  - Total: 102
- Time zone: UTC+1 (CET)
  - Summer (DST): UTC+2 (CEST)

Vllahia (in Albanian) or Vlahinje is a village in the municipality of Mitrovica in the District of Mitrovica, Kosovo. According to the 2024 census, it has 102 inhabitants, all Albanians.

== Etymology ==
The etymology of the village's name is of Aromanian/Vlach origin who inhabited this village.
