= Sherif Voca =

Albanian politician and activist

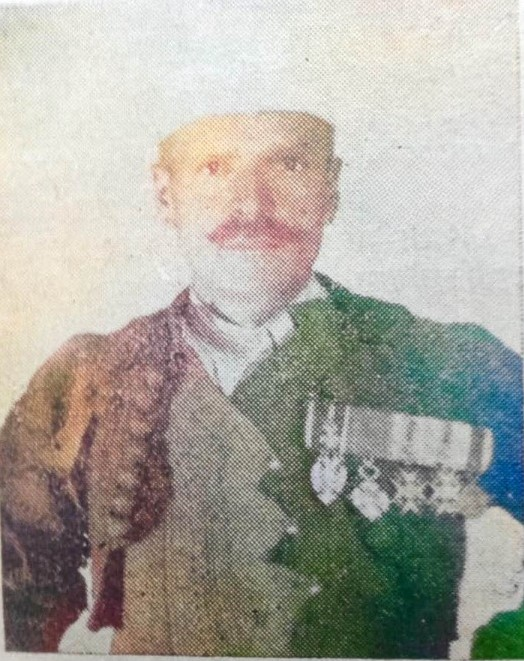
Sherif Voca

Sherif Voca (1893 – 14 April 1941) was an Albanian politician from Kosovo. He is well-known for condemning the mass displacement of Albanians to Turkey.

== Biography ==
Sherif Voca was born in Melenicë in the region of Shala. In 1912, together with his father, he participated in the Assembly of Kurillove, where a pact was signed between the regions of Shala and Llapi to organize the war against the Ottomans. He opposed the Serbian occupation of Kosovo in 1912. During the Austro-Hungarian rule (1916–1918), he was committed to opening schools in Mitrovica and the surrounding area and organizing local government. After the reconquest of Kosovo and the establishment of the Serbo-Croatian Slovene Kingdom, in the 1922 elections he was elected mayor of Bare. He held the post for 12 years. In the 1935 elections he was elected among the eight Albanian deputies in the Yugoslav Parliament. His speech in the Yugoslav Parliament in Belgrade (1937) is well known, where he condemned the Yugoslav-Turkish agreement on the relocation of Albanians to Turkey. Due to threats, he was forced to flee to Albania, then to Egypt, Greece, etc. In 1940 he returned to Mitrovica. He opposed the killings of Albanian soldiers in the Mitrovica garrison and civilians by Serbian army officers. On April 14, 1941, he was killed by Serbian soldiers while trying to cross to Shala to organize his fellow countrymen for protection from the Serbian army.

== Sources ==
- Osmani, Jusuf (2018). Sherif Voca në dokumente arkivore. Qendra Dokumentare Shkencore. ISBN 978-9951763011.
