= RTV Dukagjini =

Kosovo national television channel

Radio Televizioni Dukagjini
- Type: Private commercial broadcaster
- Country: Kosovo
- Headquarters: Rr. Gjergj Fishta, Pristina–Mitrovica highway, Obiliq, Kosovo

Programming
- Language: Albanian
- Picture format: 16:9

Ownership
- Owner: Ekrem Lluka (80%)
- Parent: Dukagjini Sh.p.k.
- Key people: Dardan Belegu (director); Shareholders: Edita Doli Muhaxhiri; Dardan Belegu; Ermal Panduri
- Sister channels: Radio Dukagjini

History
- Launched: September 2001

Links
- Website: dukagjini.com

Radio Televizioni Dukagjini (also known as RTV Dukagjini or TV Dukagjini) is a private national broadcaster based in Kosovo. It was founded in Peja in September 2001, one year after the launch of Radio Dukagjini. In 2015, the channel began transitioning to HD broadcasting and expanded its content to become a generalist channel with a broader national reach.

The channel is owned by Dukagjini Sh.p.k., with businessman Ekrem Lluka holding the majority stake.

== History ==
TV Dukagjini was launched in September 2001 in Peja by the Lluka brothers, two years after the founding of Radio Dukagjini on 16 September 1999.

== Programming ==
Some of the regular programs broadcast by Dukagjini Television include:

- Debat Plus
- Reload
- Five
- News at 15:00 & 19:30
- Krejt n'Debat
- Radar with Edita Doli (simulcast on Radio Dukagjini)
- Weekend with Lorinda Kolgeci
- U Knaqëm t'u Knaq
- Personale
- Komplot
- Pak pa Thënë Natën e Mirë
- Dueli Sportiv
- Moment with Gresa Bajrami
- Get Up, Stand Up (simulcast on Radio Dukagjini)
- Historical Files
- Rreth e Rrotull
- Mendje Kriminale
- Kosova Tjetër

== See also ==
- Telegrafi – an online news portal owned by the Lluka family and affiliated with Dukagjini Television
