= Melenicë =

Melenicë Meljenica
- Village
- Location in Kosovo
- Coordinates: 42°57′18″N 20°55′30″E
- Location: Kosovo
- District: Mitrovicë
- Municipality: Mitrovicë
- Elevation: 1,052 m (3,451 ft)

Population (2024)
  - Total: 208
- Time zone: UTC+1 (CET)
  - Summer (DST): UTC+2 (CEST)

Melenicë (in Albanian) or Meljenica (Serbian: Мељеница) is a village in the municipality of Mitrovica in the District of Mitrovica, Kosovo. According to the 2024 census, it has 208 inhabitants.

== Demography ==
In 2024 census, the village had in total 208 inhabitants, from whom 200 were Albanians.

== Notable people ==
- Beqir Voca (1841–1926)
- Sherif Voca (1893–1941), Albanian politician
