= Llapi River =

River in Kosovo

Llapi
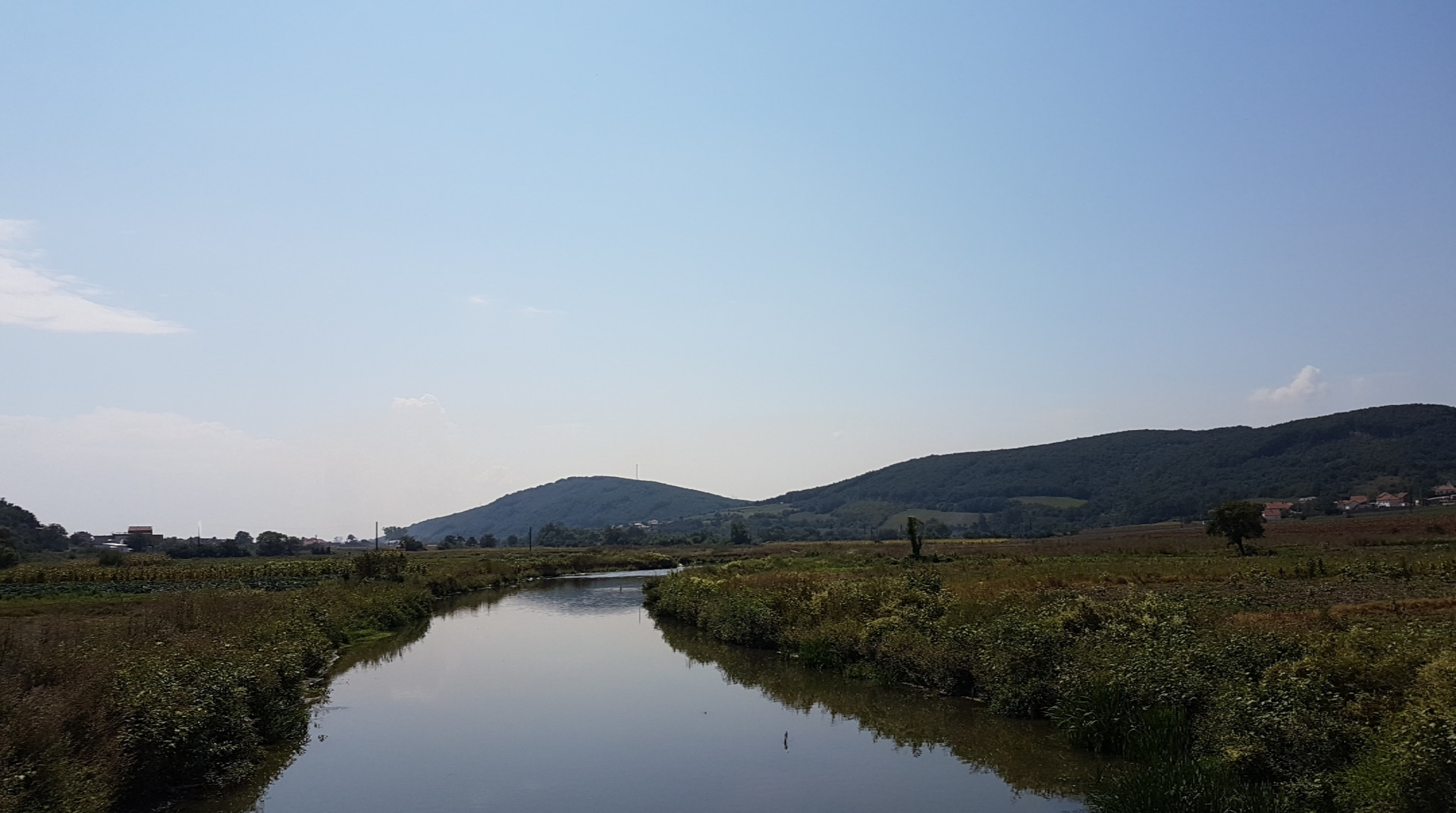
- The Llapi river at Podujevë

Location
- Country: Kosovo

Physical characteristics
- Source
  - location: Pollatë, Podujevë, Kosovo
- Mouth
  - location: Lumadh, Vushtrri, Kosovo
  - coordinates: 42.7553°N 21.0172°E
- Length: 72 km (45 mi)
- Basin size: 950 km^{2} (370 sq mi)

Basin features
- Progression: Sitnica→ Ibar→ West Morava→ Great Morava→ Danube→ Black Sea
- Cities: Podujevë

The Llapi River (Note: Albanian: Llapi or Llap; Serbian: Лаб, romanized: Lab) is a river in the north-eastern part of Kosovo. The 72 km (45 mi) long right tributary to the Sitnica river, it is the main river in the Llap (region) depression.

== Etymology ==
The etymology of the river's name is derived from a pre-Slavic form Alb that underwent linguistic metathesis within Slavic giving the final form as Lab.

The name of the river was first used in Antiquity and the Middle Ages, but has been preserved in the New Age.

Many scholars take the hydronym Lab as ancient and derive it from an alb-, from which lab-, alp- could come. The phonetic form for Albanian speakers is Llap. In the Middle Ages, the form Lapia is found.

== History ==
Near its origin are the remains of one of the medieval palaces of Serbian King Milutin (1282-1321) called Vrhlab.

Ottoman writer Evliya Celebi mentioned the Llapi river as having "its source in Albania" and joining other rivers before flowing into the Danube, during one of his travels to Kosovo in the 1660s.

== Overview ==
The Llapi River originates in the northernmost village of Podujevë, Murgull, 744.2 m (2,442 ft) with a secondary source in the village of Pollatë. After descending from the mountains, it flows southward through Podujevë. Near the village of Lupçi i Poshtëm, the Kaçandolli river joins it, as its right tributary. Close to Pristina and Obiliq, the river turns westwards of its origin and joins the Sitnica river, in the village of Lumadh. The width of the river changes due to the dynamics of rivers, it is around 9–12 meters at the hydrometric point in Lluzhan and it has a depth up to 1.2 m (3.9 ft), that varies based on the season and the location.

Llapi River
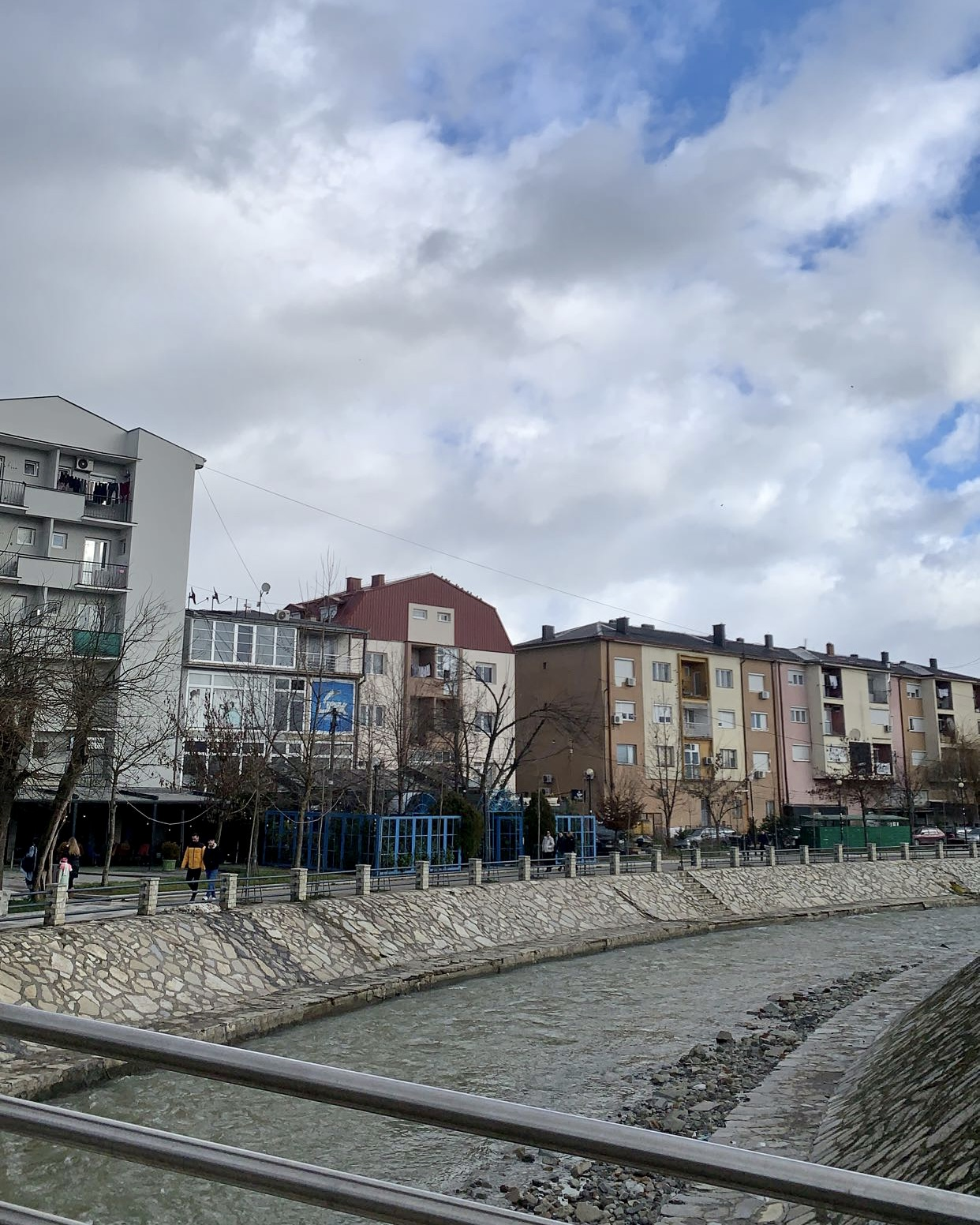
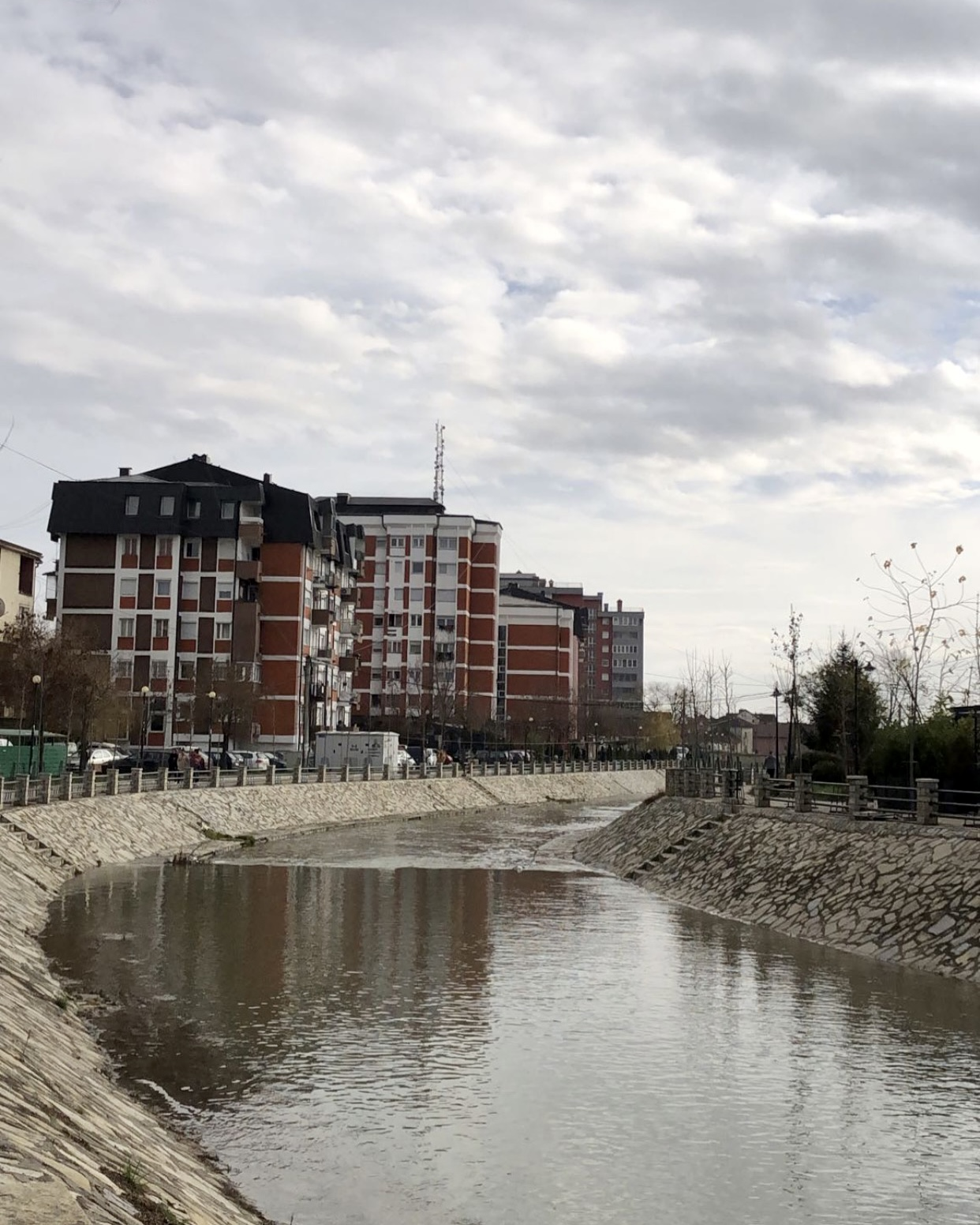

== See also ==
- List of rivers of Kosovo
- Geography of Kosovo
