= Lupçi i Poshtëm =

Village in Podujevë, Kosovo

Lupçi i Poshtëm Lupç i Poshtëm Donje Ljupče
- Village
- Location within Kosovo
- Coordinates: 42°47′38″N 21°9′3″E
- District: Pristina
- Municipality: Podujevo
- Elevation: 623 m (2,044 ft)

Population (2024)
  - Total: 1,631
- Time zone: UTC+1 (Central European Time)
  - Summer (DST): UTC+2 (CEST)
- Postal code: 11050

Lupçi i poshtëm (Albanian: Lupçi i Poshtëm) is a village located in the municipality of Podujeva, in northeastern Kosovo.

It was mentioned in the 1455 defter as having 76 houses.
