= Stantërg =

Stantërg is a small town located near the city of Mitrovica. Shala e Bajgorës region in Kosovo. It is best known for its proximity to the Trepça Mines, one of the largest mining complexes in Europe. The town has a rich mining history, with the Trepça Mine being a significant source of lead, zinc, and silver.

== Overview ==
The Trepça Mine has been an important economic asset for the region, providing numerous jobs and contributing to the local and national economy. In addition to its industrial significance, the mine has also made Stantërg a site of geological interest due to the wide variety of minerals and crystals found there.

The Trepça Crystal Museum, located in Stantërg, showcases this geological wealth with a collection of over 1,500 crystal and mineral exhibits. The museum serves as an educational and tourist attraction, highlighting the natural beauty and scientific importance of the minerals extracted from the mine.

Stantërg's connection to the Trepça Mines makes it a place of both historical and contemporary importance in Kosovo, reflecting the region's industrial heritage and its ongoing contributions to the fields of geology and mineralogy.
