= Bislim Bajgora =

Albanian military commander and Axis collaborator (1880–1947)

Bislim Kadriu Bajgora
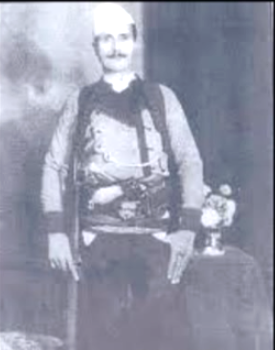
- Born: 1880; Shala, Mitrovica, Ottoman Empire
- Died: 1 March 1947 (aged 66–67); Mitrovica, Yugoslavia
- Occupations: Commander of the Balli Kombëtar and SS Adjutant for Günther Hausding
- Years active: 1940–1947

Bislim Kadri Bajgora (1880 – 1 March 1947) was an Albanian nationalist and Axis collaborator, Adjutant for the Balli Kombëtar forces of Kosovo during World War II. He is known for killing Albanian communist Vasil Shanto.

== Biography ==
=== Early life ===
Born in Bajgorë around 1880 to an Albanian patriotic family, he grew up with guns and tales of Albanian heroism. He was from the Shala tribe of Mitrovica.

=== Activities during the war ===
When the Axis powers occupied Kosovo in the 1940s, Kosovar-Albanians saw the chance to free themselves from Yugoslav rule and collaborated with the Germans. When the Germans occupied Kosovo, the Albanians freely chose to serve in the German Army which surprised the Germans. Bislim Bajgora was offered by the DDR to join the German military police and get a plot in Hamburg, and Bislim rejected it, and said that he will not accept it and he will fight for his country.

The Germans had for a long time been very interested in working the Trepça mines and when they seized it, they started producing zinc and lead for the army. When the German forces occupied Mitrovica, they were not attacked as the Albanians saw it as liberation from the chetnik-Serbian forces. The city was handed over to influential leaders such as Bislim Bajgora, Ahmet Selaci, Ukshin Kovaqica, etc. Bislim Bajgora had a good reputation among the Shala tribe and the region had a good, strategic location enabling a good defence. When the Germans occupied the city they asked for an authoritative character and the Albanians picked Bislim Bajgora to lead the liberation forces of Mitrovica thus the Germans, in need of an ally against the Serb, gave Albanians arms and training. Immediately, the Shala-tribe and the Germans began cooperating and they received help from Xhafer Deva who ran the German-Albanian politics in the city. Bislim Bajgora and Xhafer Deva got along well and showed mutual respect.

On 21 April 1941, there was a gathering of the Albanian forces and the Germans at the Jadran Hotel, where Xhafer Deva sought to station his political activities and the Germans approved of his request. Bislim Bajgora had now won full support from the Germans and was considered a good ally of Germany. He became an adjutant for Günther Hausding, head of Gestapo, the German secret police. After 21 April the Germans opened up schools for Albanian language for the first time in 40 years Albanians were able to educate themselves. The tribes of Shala and Bajgora was given arms and they were enforced further by more recruits led by commander Ahmet Selaci and Pajazit Boletini (nephew of Isa Boletini).

The forces of the Balli Kombetar were mainly stationed in Mitrovica, but also among regions which were under control of Bislim Bajgora, Ukshin Kovaqica, Mehmet Gradica, Shaban Polluzha, Sylejman Vuqiterna, etc. The Balli Kombetar patrolled the city, keeping order but they mainly focused on guarding the borders of Greater Albania which the Germans had created for the first time since 1912.

On the first February 1944, Bislim Bajgora's forces arrested Albanian communist Vasil Shanto and Miladin Popović in Shkodër. Bislim Bajgora decided to execute Vasil Shanto in order to take revenge for Adem Boletini, Isa Boletini's son and Albanian nationalist, who was killed by Vasil Shanto.

=== Death ===
When World War II ended and the Yugoslav communists won, Bislim Bajgora and his forces refused to surrender. On 16 December 1946, 18 members of the Yugoslav Secret Service and the KNOJ were killed by Bislim Bajgora’s forces near Vushtrri. On 3 March 1947, the Yugoslav forces finally killed Bislim Bajgora.

== Legacy ==
A street in Mitrovicë bears his name Bislim Bajgora.

== Sources ==
- Istrefi, Asllan (2017). Bislim Kadri Bajgora: (1900-1947) : monografi. Atunis. ISBN 978-9951741255.
