= Bajgora =

Bajgora Bajgorë
- Village
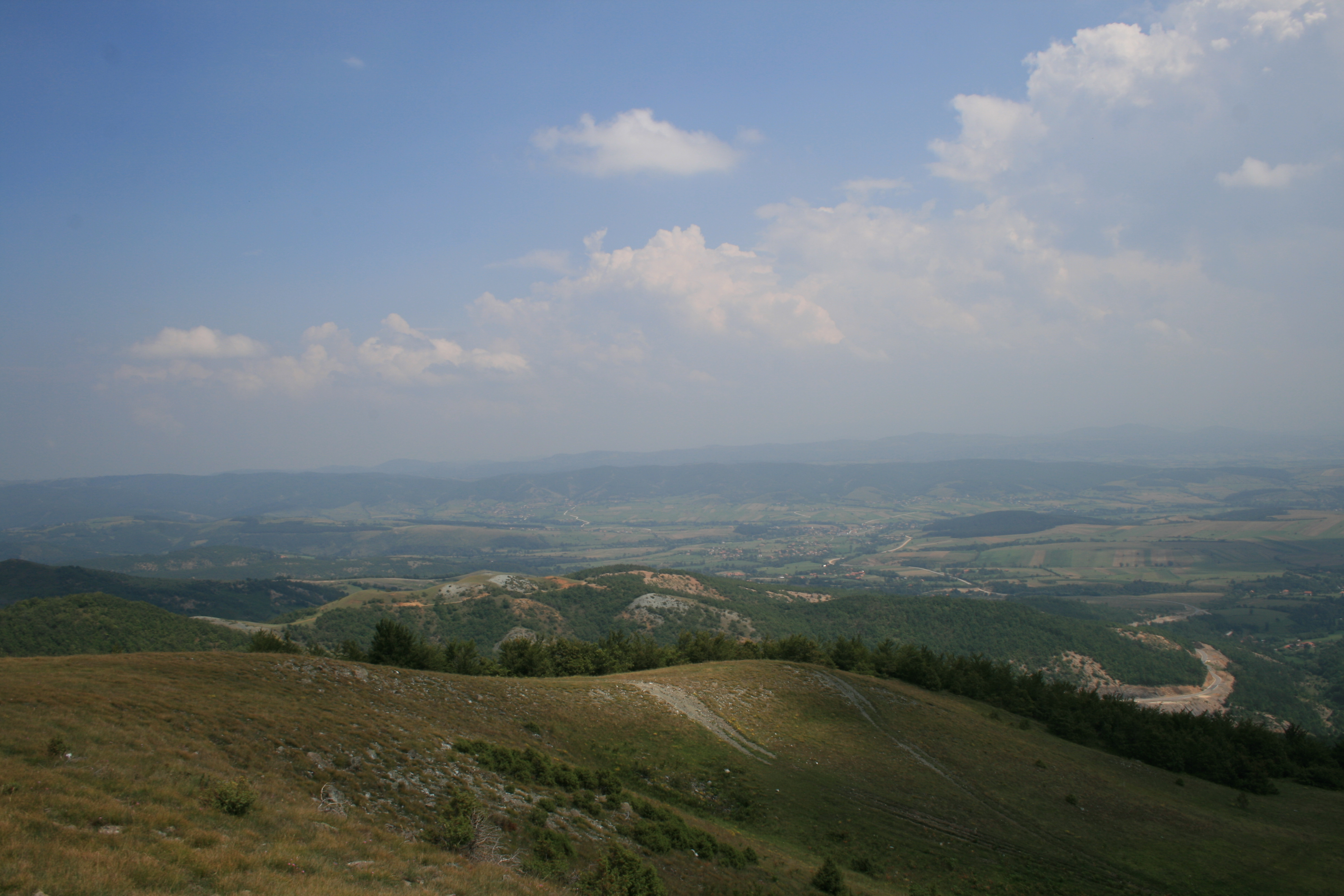

- Location in Kosovo
- Coordinates: 42°57′08″N 21°00′14.4″E
- Country: Kosovo
- District: Mitrovica
- Municipality: Mitrovica

Population (2024)
  - Total: 327
- Time zone: UTC+1 (CET)
  - Summer (DST): UTC+2 (CEST)

Bajgora (Albanian: Bajgorë; Serbian; Бајгора) is a village in the municipality of Mitrovica in Kosovo. It is located in the south of the Kopaonik mountain range. It is just a few kilometers south from the 1,789 m (5,869 ft) high Bajraku peak. According to the 2011 census, it had 1,098 inhabitants, all ethnic Albanians. It is part of the region known as Shala e Bajgorës.

Bajgora was the scene of Kosovo Liberation Army activity during the Kosovo War of 1999.

== Notable people ==
- Bislim Bajgora, Adjutant for the Balli Kombetar forces of Kosovo
- Mehë Uka, educator and polticial prisoner honoured with the Hero of Kosovo Order

== Gallery ==
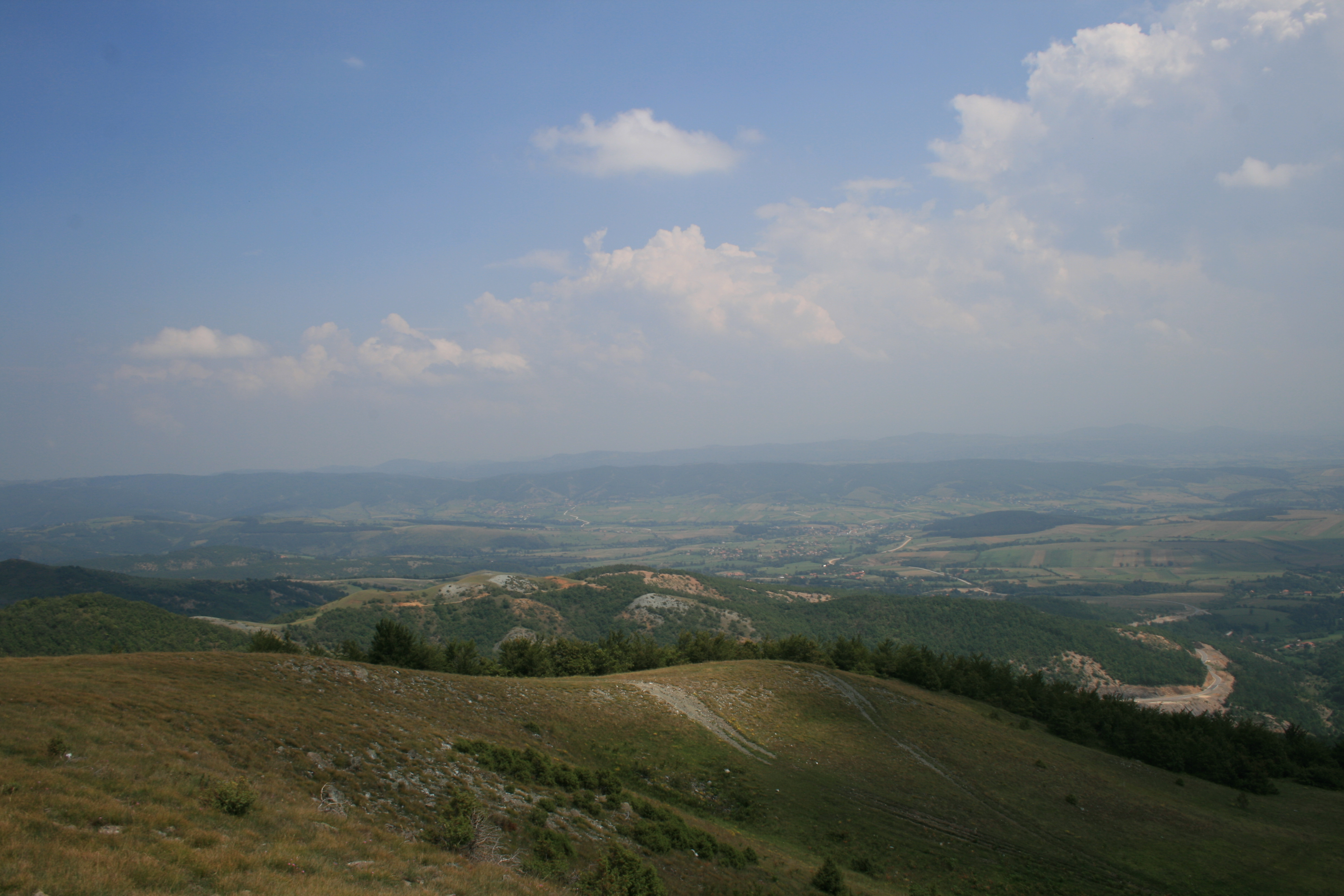
Overview

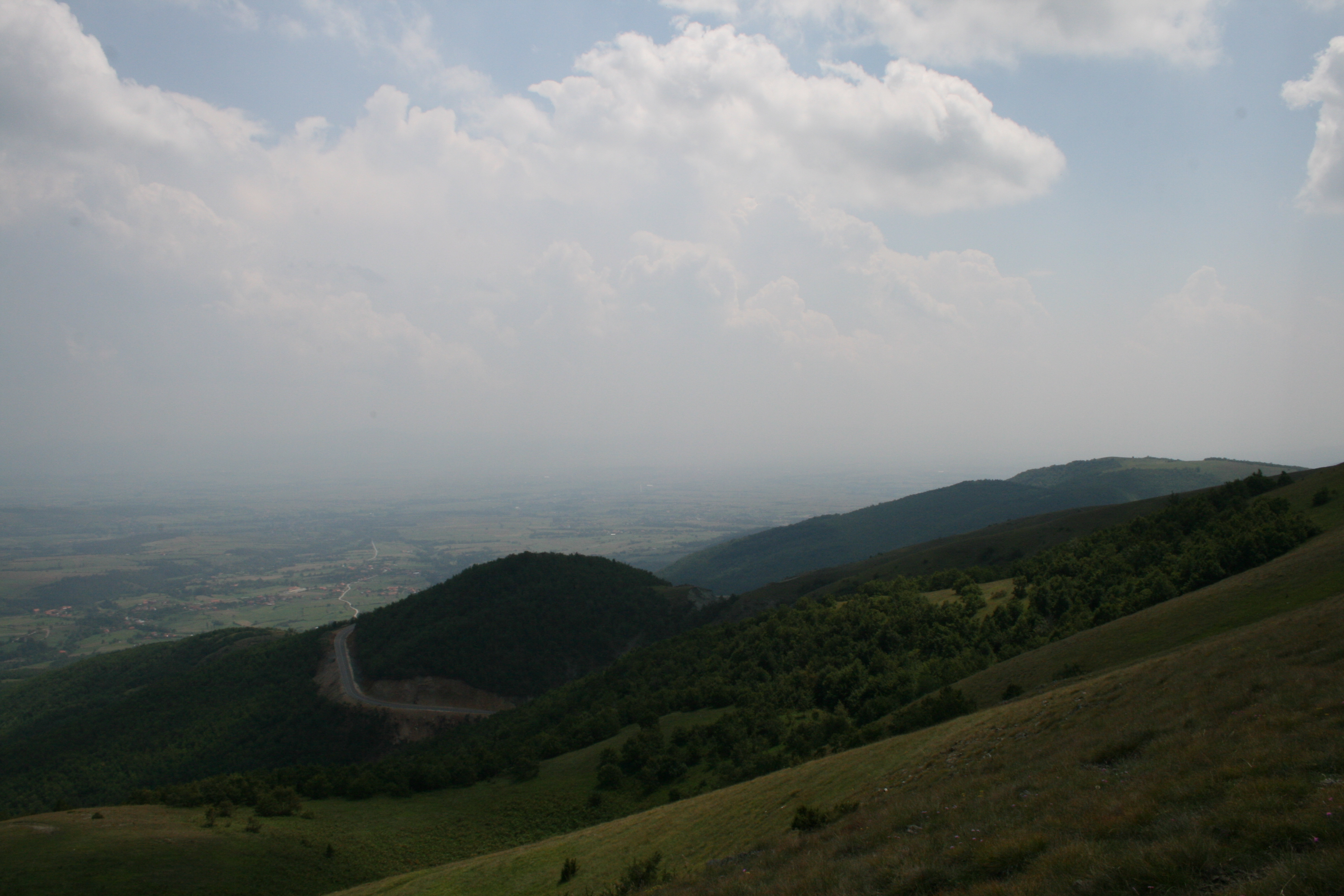
Another Overview

== See also ==
- Bajgora Wind Farm
