= Sitnica (Ibar) =

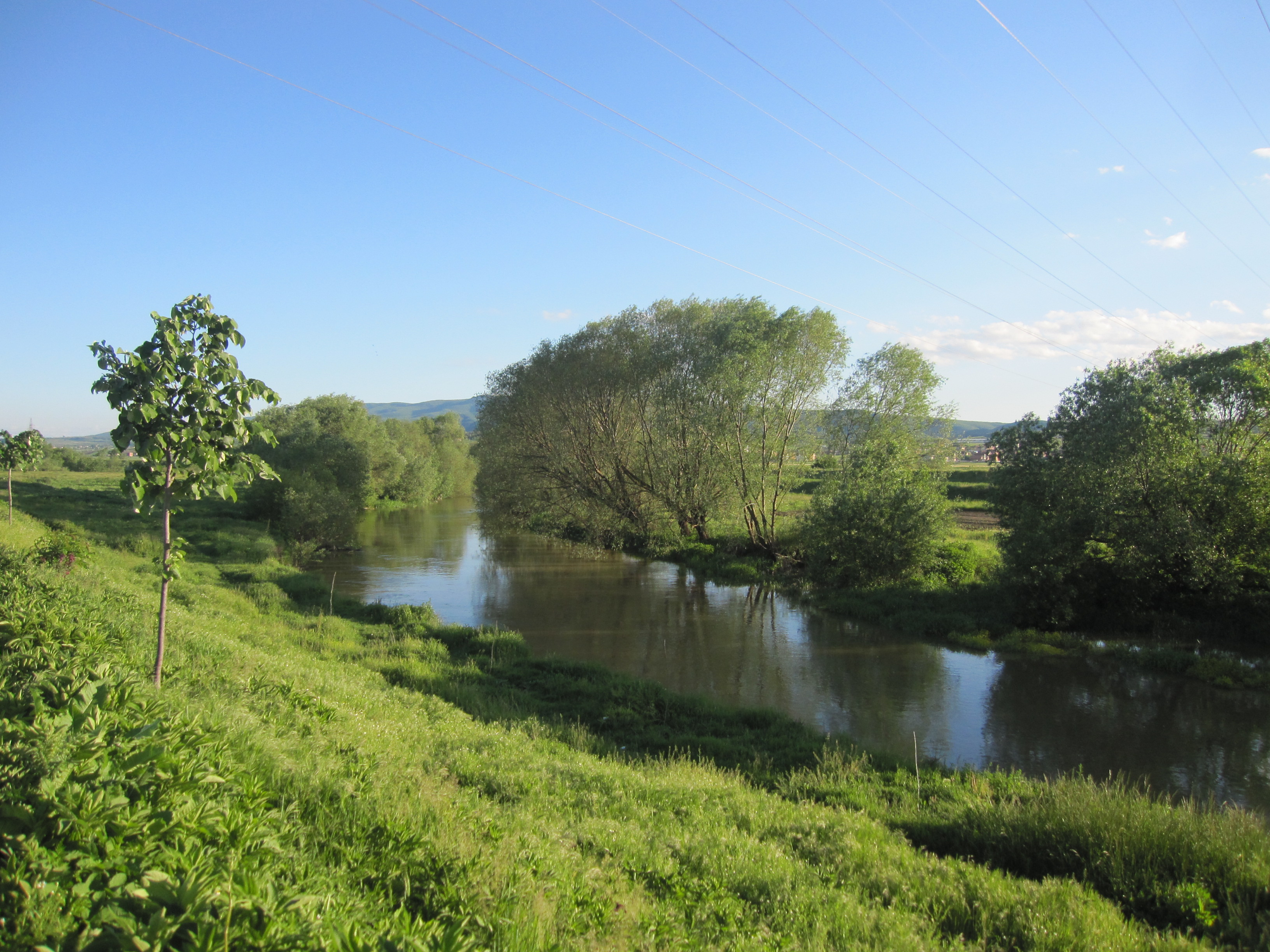

Location
- Country: Kosovo

Physical characteristics
- Source
  - location: Sazli pond, north of Ferizaj, Kosovo
  - elevation: 560 m (1,840 ft)
- Mouth
  - location: Ibar, at Mitrovica, Kosovo
  - coordinates: 42°54′03″N 20°52′23″E
  - elevation: 499 m (1,637 ft)
- Length: 90 km (56 mi)
- Basin size: 3,129 km^{2} (1,208 sq mi)
- Discharge
  - average: 9.5 m^{3}/s (340 cu ft/s)

Basin features
- Progression: Ibar→ West Morava→ Great Morava→ Danube→ Black Sea

The Sitnica (Albanian indefinite form: Sitnicë, Serbian Cyrillic: Ситница) is a 90 km-long (56 mi) river in Kosovo. It flows into the Ibar at Mitrovica, and it is the longest river that flows completely within Kosovo.

== History ==
In the 14th century, during the reign of king Milutin, a canal connecting the Sazli and the river Nerodime was dug, creating an artificial bifurcation, since the Nerodime flows to the south into the Lepenac river and thus belongs to the Aegean Sea drainage basin, while the Sitnica flows to the north, into the Ibar river and belongs to the Black Sea drainage basin. After World War II, the canal was covered with earth again.

The Sitnica was supposed to be the major part of the huge Ibar-Lepenac Hydrosystem, which was to regulate Ibar-Sitnica-Lepenac watercourse (including ecological protection, irrigation and power production), but the projected plan never came true.

== Course ==
The Sitnica originates from the Sazli pond in the village of Sazli, north of the town of Ferizaj, and it is initially called the Sazlia river itself.

The Sitnica flows generally to the north, as the main river in the Kosovo Field, on the western slopes of the Žegovac mountain (from which it receives the right tributary of Žegovska river, south of Lipjan), next to the villages of Muhadžer Talinovac, Muhadžer Babuš, Robovce (where it receives the tributary of Shtime river from the left), Topličane, Gracko, Mali Alaš and the town of Lipjan. The river continues to the north between the villages Suvi Do, Skulanovo, Radevo and Batuse, as it enters the Kosovo coal basin (with the major mine, Dobri Do, right on the river), west of the provincial capital of Pristina. This is an area where the Sitnica receives some of its most important tributaries: the highly polluted Gračanka and Prištevka from the right, and the Drenica from the Drenica depression, from the left.

The river passes west of the Pristina suburbs of Kosovo Polje and Obiliq and the village of Plemetina, between the mountain of Čičavica on the west, and the northernmost slopes of the Kopaonik mountain, on the east. The Sitnica leaves the coal basin as the most polluted river in the area, especially notorious for its highly toxic phenol spills, which pollutes not only the Sitnica, but also the downstream Ibar and West Morava rivers.

The Sitnica continues to the northwest, next to the villages of Prilužje, Mijalić, Reka (where it receives its major tributary, the Llapi from the right) Pestovo (where it receives another right tributary, the Slakovačka river), the town of Vushtrri, Senjak, Veliki Kičić and Malo Kičiće, emptying into the Ibar as its right tributary at Mitrovica, with an average discharge of 9,5 m^{3}/s.

Because of the relatively small inclination in its 3,129 km^{2} (1,208 sq mi) drainage basin (altitudes of 560 m (1,837 ft) on its outflow from the Sazli and 499 m (1,637 ft) on its confluence into the Ibar), the Sitnica meanders a lot. Many meanders have been cut through and dried out, so a curiosity is the long, nine-pillar Vojnovića bridge above the dry river bed, near Vushtrri.

== Gallery ==
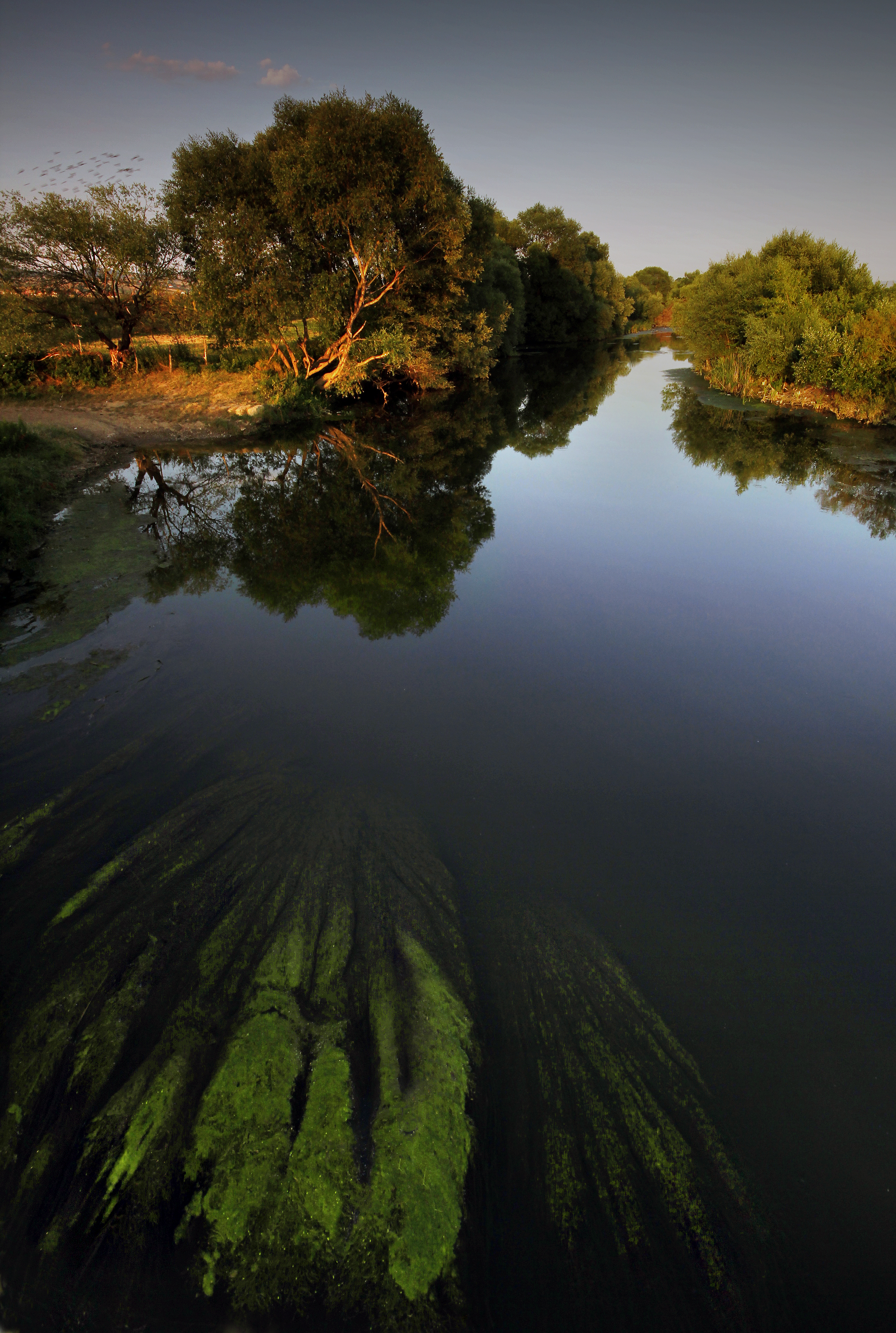
The Sitnica from the Stone Bridge in Vushtrri

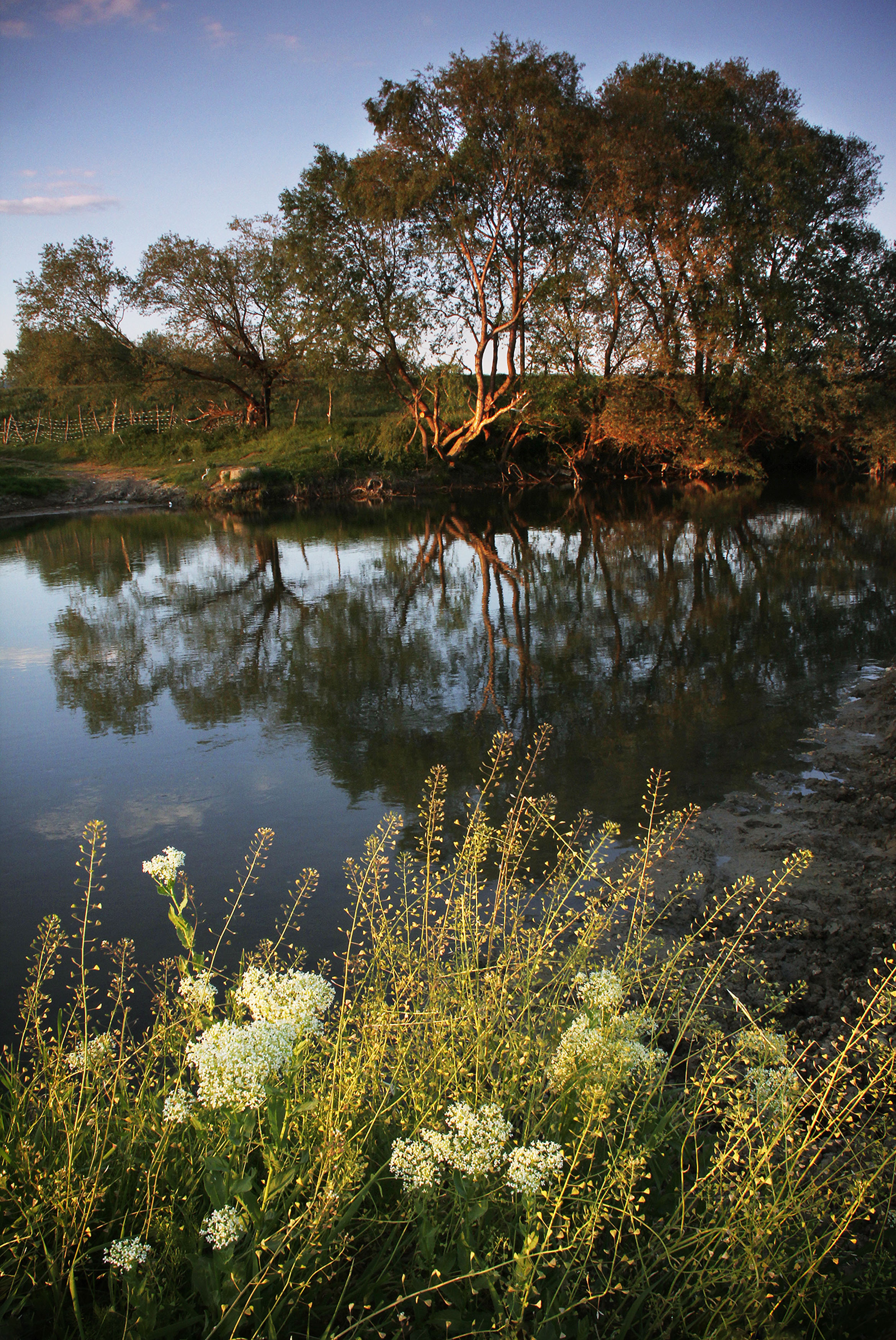
The Sitnica in summer

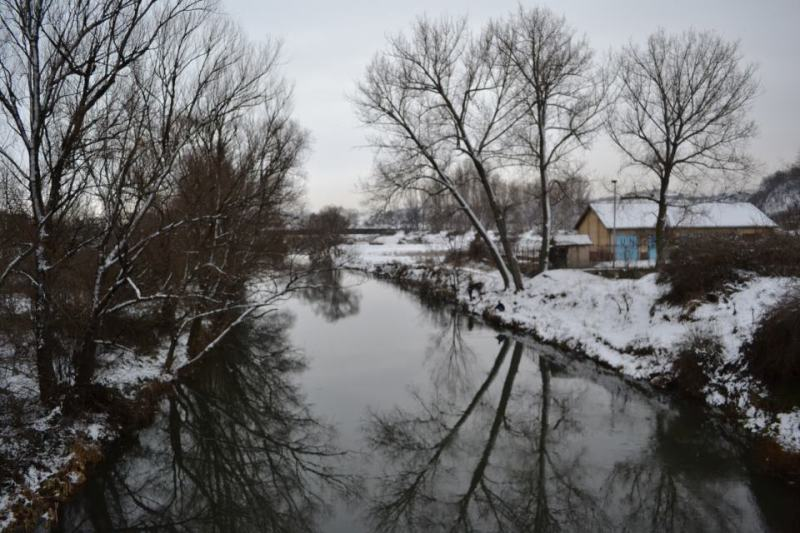
The Sitnica in winter

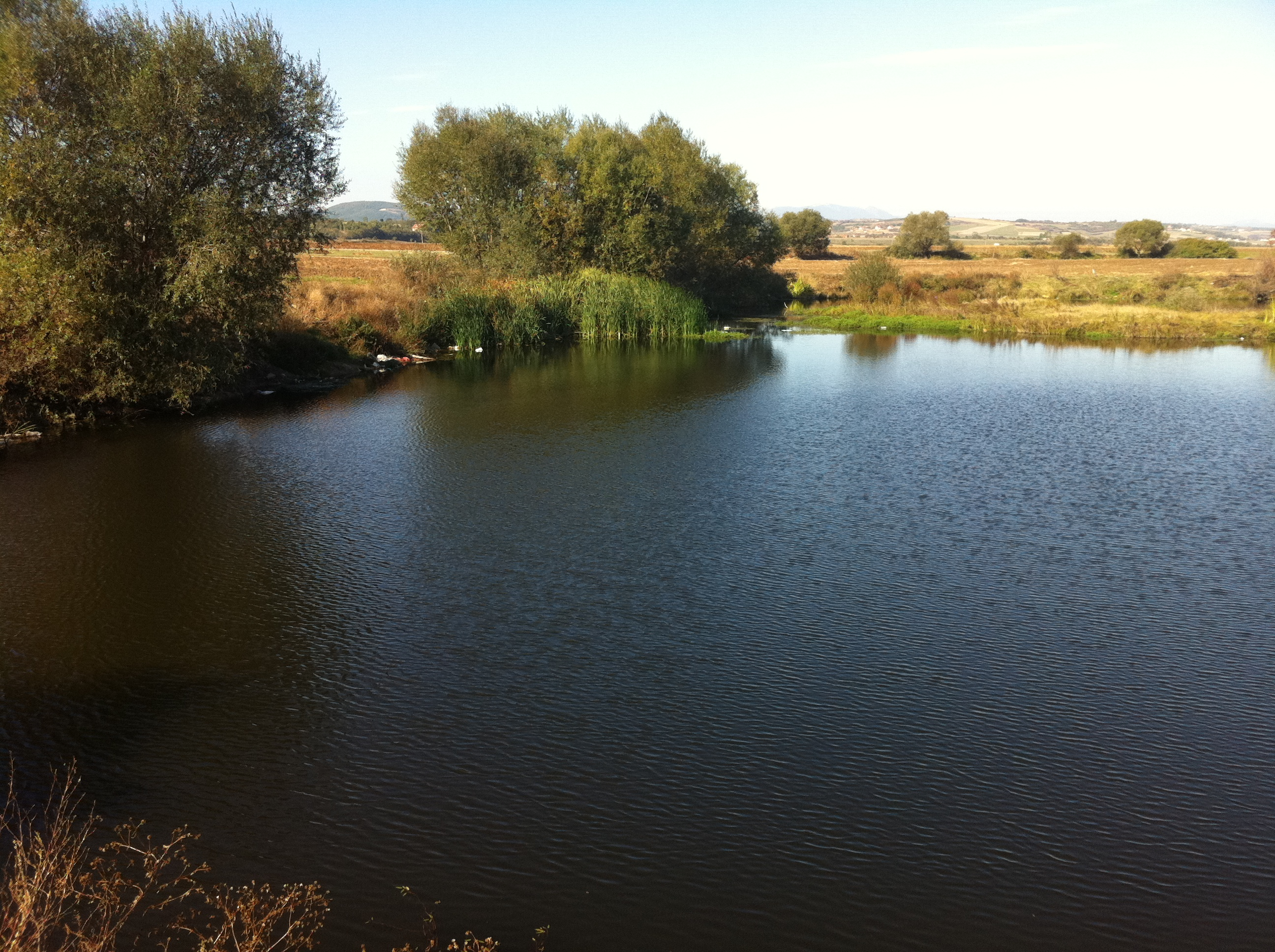
The Sitnica by the Haxhi well near Pestova

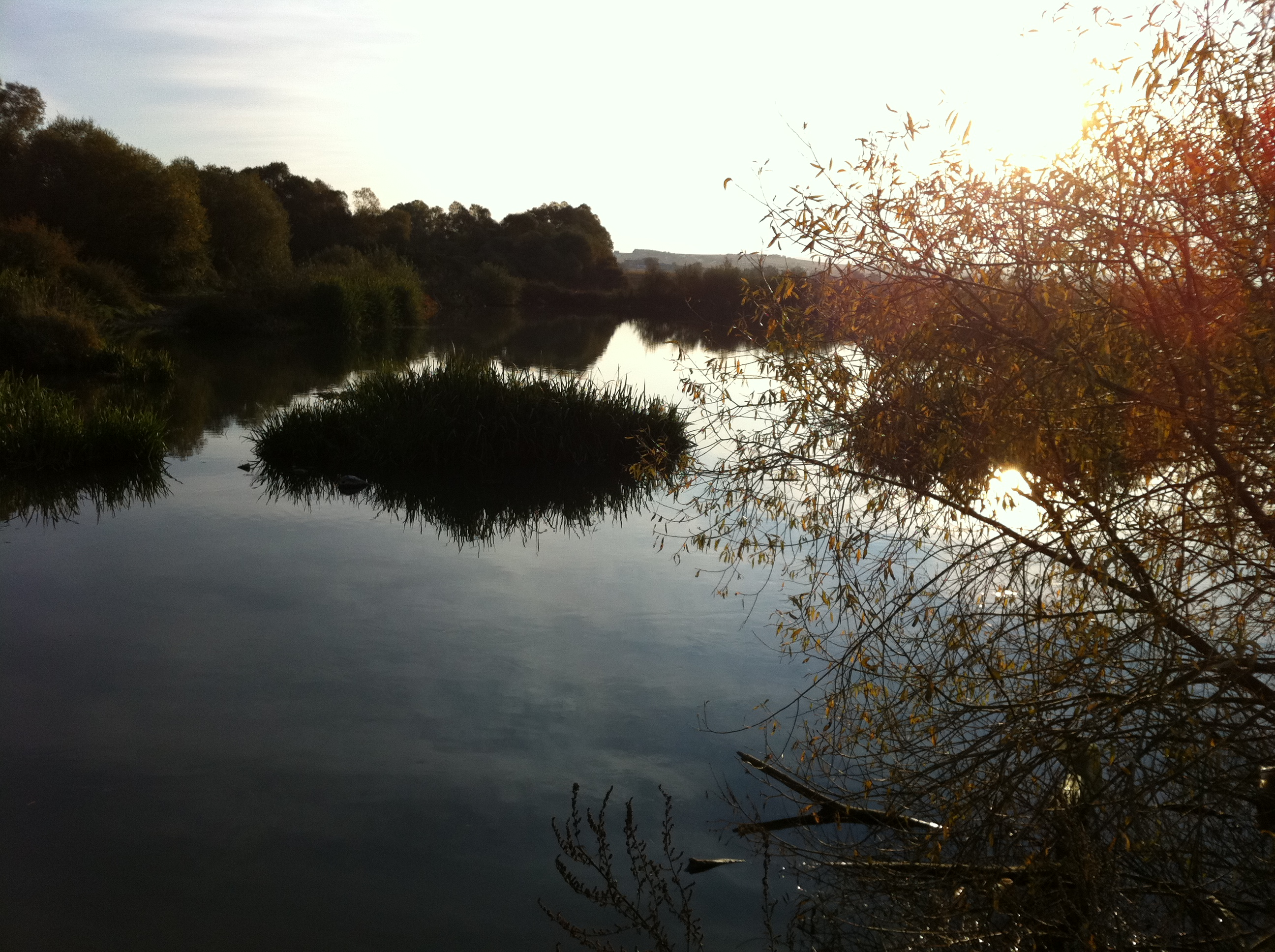
Marshes on the Sitnica

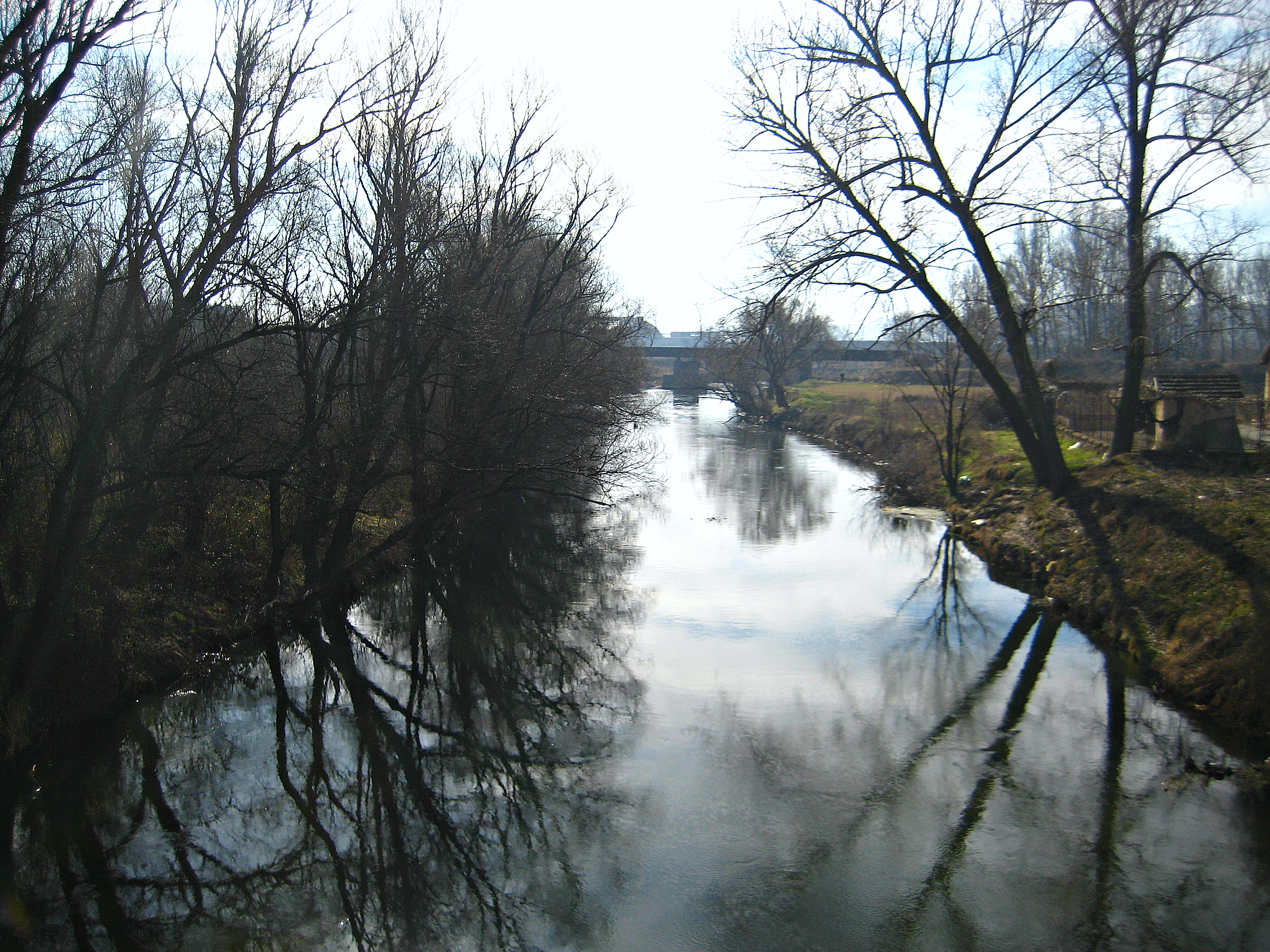
The Sitnica at Mitrovica

== Sources ==
- Mala Prosvetina Enciklopedija, Third edition (1985); Prosveta; ISBN 86-07-00001-2
- Jovan Đ. Marković (1990): Enciklopedijski geografski leksikon Jugoslavije; Svjetlost-Sarajevo; ISBN 86-01-02651-6
