= Ujmani Dam =

Dam in District of Kosovska Mitrovica, Serbia

Gazivode Dam
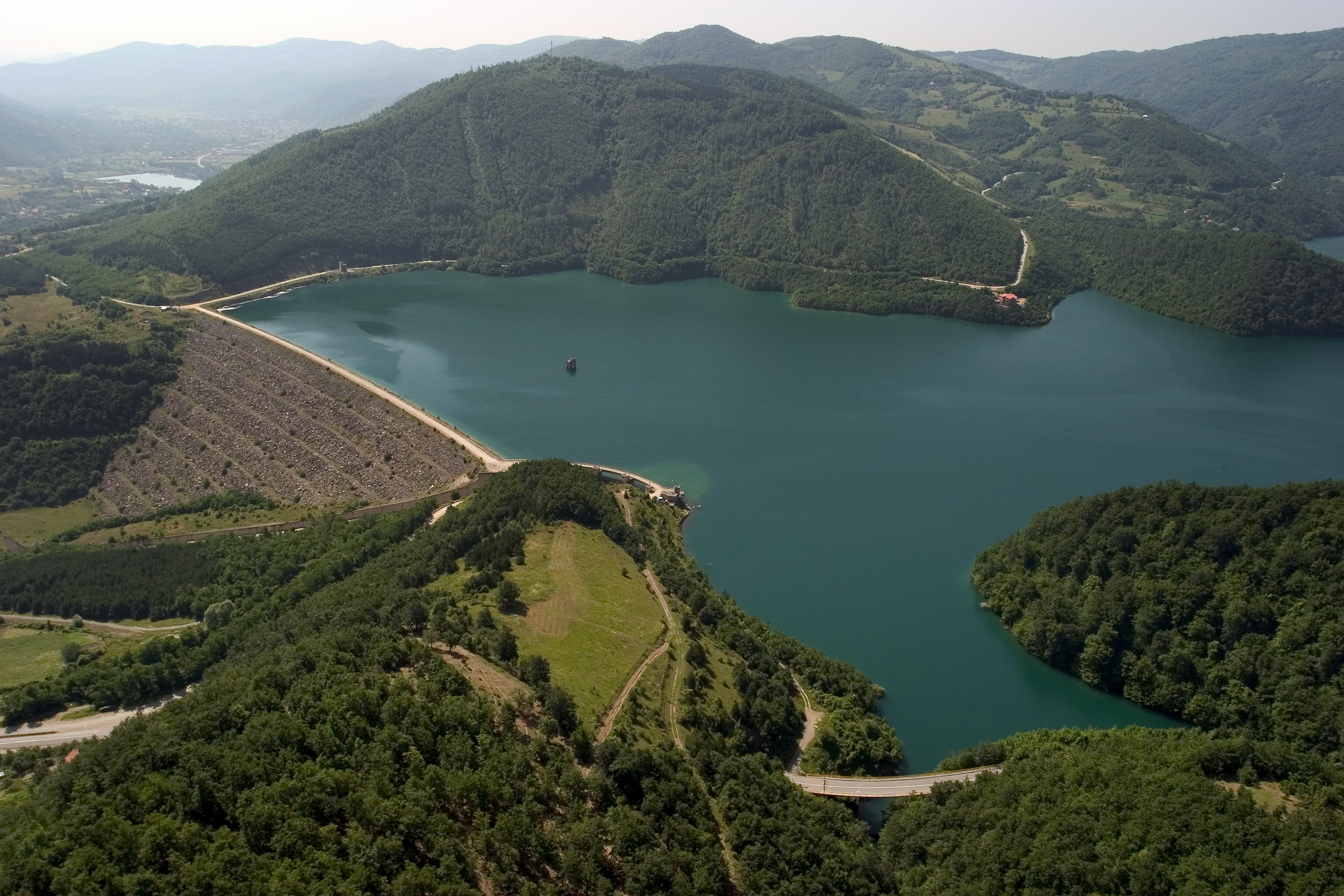
- Interactive map of Gazivode Dam
- Official name: Gazivodska Brana / Газиводска Брана
- Country: Kosovo
- Location: District of Mitrovica
- Coordinates: 42°56′25.12″N 20°39′7.39″E
- Purpose: Power
- Status: Operational
- Opening date: 1979; 47 years ago
- Owner: Ibar-Lepenica

Dam and spillways
- Type of dam: Embankment, rock-fill
- Impounds: Ibar River
- Height: 101 m (331 ft)
- Length: 519 m (1,703 ft)

Reservoir
- Creates: Gazivode Lake
- Total capacity: 370,000,000 m^{3} (300,000 acre⋅ft)
- Active capacity: 350,000,000 m^{3} (280,000 acre⋅ft)
- Catchment area: 1,100 km^{2} (420 mi^{2})
- Surface area: 11.9 km^{2} (4.6 mi^{2})

Power Station
- Turbines: 2 x 17.5 MW
- Installed capacity: 35 MW

The Gazivode Dam, officially Gazivodska Brana / Газиводска Брана, is a rock-filled embankment dam on the Ibar River in the Kosovska Mitrovica District, Serbia. It was completed in 1979 and forms Gazivode Lake, the largest reservoir in Kosovo and Metohija. The dam supports a hydroelectric power station which is located at its base. It has an installed capacity of 35 MW. Ujmani Lake covers 11.9 km^{2} (4.6 mi^{2}) of which 2.7 km^{2} (1.0 mi^{2}) are in Central Serbia. At 101 m (331 ft) in height, it is also the tallest dam in Kosovo and Metohija.
