= Asllan Tupella Tower House =

Cultural heritage monument of Kosovo

- Kulla e Asllan Tupellës (Albanian)
- Interactive map of Asllan Tupella Tower House
- 42°53′26″N 20°52′27″E
- Location: Kçiq i Vogël, Mitrovica, Kosovo

History
- Built: 19th century

The Asllan Tupella Tower House is a cultural heritage monument in Kçiq i Vogël, Mitrovica, Kosovo.

== History ==
The tower house of Asllan Tupella lies in the eponymous Tupella neighborhood of Kçiq i Vogël in the municipality of Mitrovica. Ferhat Asllan Tupella (born in 1947) reports that Asllan's father Ahmet built the tower in the late 19th century. The first floor housed the family, while the ground floor served as a school. Later, a stable was added for guests’ horses on the first floor. The only change made since then is the porch's removal in 1990. The building's condition is precarious and threatens the family today, since both the ground floor and first floor are built on un-mortared stone. Arched turret windows face east, west, and south; the north side has two portholes for observation and gunsights. The mezzanine, staircase, ceiling, and roof are wooden, covered by a square tile roof.
