= Shipol =

Shipol: Shipol (Albanian)
- Suburb
- Location in Kosovo
- Coordinates: 42°51′49″N 20°50′56″E
- Location: Kosovo
- District: Mitrovicë
- Municipality: Mitrovicë
- Elevation: 540 m (1,770 ft)

Population (2024)
  - Total: 4,195
- Time zone: UTC+1 (CET)
  - Summer (DST): UTC+2 (CEST)

Shipol (in Albanian) is a suburb in the municipality of Mitrovica in the District of Mitrovica, Kosovo. According to the 2024 census, it has 4,195 inhabitants.

== Geography ==
Shipol is located in the southwest of Mitrovica. The R-101, regional road which connects Mitrovica and Peja, passes through Shipol.

== Demography ==
In 2024 census, the village had in total 4,195 inhabitants, from whom 4,191 were Albanians.

Historical population

Year	Pop.	±%
1948	279	—
1953	323	+15.8%
1961	456	+41.2%
1971	1,484	+225.4%

Year	Pop.	±%
1981	3,131	+111.0%
1991	3,595	+14.8%
2011	4,834	+34.5%
2024	4,195	−13.2%

Source: Evolution of the population 1948-2011

== Sports ==
KF Bashkimi Shipol was a football club which played in the Regional League of Mitrovica where clubs like Trepça or Drenica competed. Bashkimi Shipol were active from 1990 until 2003 when they dissolved.

== Notable people ==
- Fatmir Latifaj (sq), Albanian imam and former UÇK soldier
