= Mikushnica =

Mikushnicë: Mikushnicë (Albanian); Mikušnica (Serbian)
- Village
- Location in Kosovo
- Coordinates: 42°46′3″N 20°50′37″E
- Location: Kosovo
- District: Mitrovicë
- Municipality: Skënderaj
- Elevation: 764 m (2,507 ft)

Population (2024)
  - Total: 351
- Time zone: UTC+1 (CET)
  - Summer (DST): UTC+2 (CEST)

Mikushnica is a village in Skenderaj, Mitrovica, Kosovo, also known since 1999 as Mikushë.

== Geography ==
The town’s name comes from a word in the Aromanian language, spoken by the Vlachs that historically lived in the area.
