= Kosovska Mitrovica District =

Kosovska Mitrovica District may refer to:

- District of Mitrovica (Kosovo/UNMIK)
- Kosovska Mitrovica District (Serbia)
