= Kçiq i Vogël =

- Village
- Location in Kosovo
- Coordinates: 42°51′48″N 20°54′56″E
- Location: Kosovo
- District: Mitrovicë
- Municipality: Mitrovicë

Population (2024)
  - Total: 1,396
- Time zone: UTC+1 (CET)

Kçiq i Vogël is a village in the municipality of Mitrovica in the District of Mitrovica, Kosovo. According to the 2011 census, it had 1,348 inhabitants, all of whom were Albanian. Kçiq i Vogël is the neighboring village of Kçiq i Madh. The Asllan Tupella Tower House lies in the village.

== See also ==
- Asllan Tupella Tower House
- Kçiq i Madh
