= Gojbulja =

Gojbulë: Gojbulë (Albanian); Гојбуља/Gojbulja (Serbian)
- Village
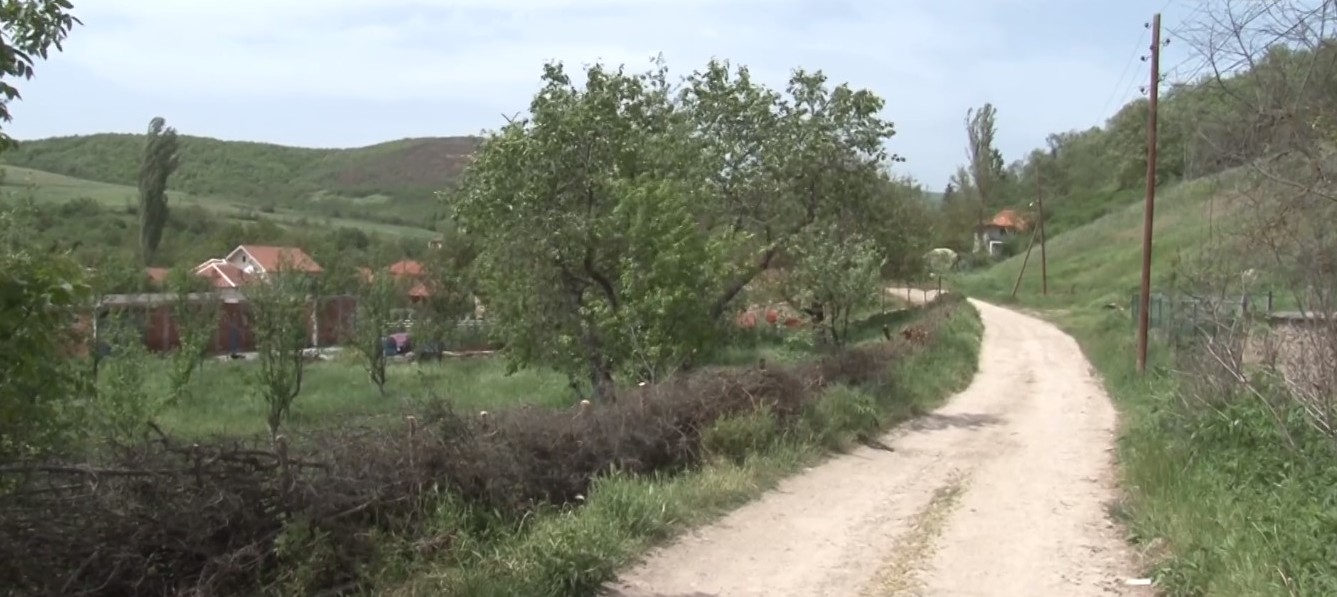
- The village of Gojbulja, in the north of Kosovo

- Location within Kosovo
- Location: Kosovo
- District: District of Mitrovica
- Municipality: Vushtrri

Population (2011)
  - Total: 877
- Time zone: UTC+1 (CET)
  - Summer (DST): UTC+2 (CEST)

Gojbulja (Serbian Cyrillic: Гојбуља) or Gojbulë is a settlement in the Vushtrri municipality of Kosovo. The rural settlement lies on a cadastral area with the same name, with 692 hectares. It lies 687 m above sea level. In the 2011 census, it had 891 inhabitants.

It was one of four Serbian villages in Vushtrri, with ca. 300 residents. But now it is majority Albanian with only 4 Serb residents. There is a local elementary school in the village.

== History ==
Gojbulja is mentioned for the first time in an Ottoman defter (tax register) of 1455, as a village with 33 houses, and a church, dedicated to Parascheva (Sv. Petka). On the tumulus of that old church, which lies at the rural cemetery, a new Church dedicated to Parascheva was built in 1986. The church was burnt during the 2004 unrest in Kosovo. In 2006 it was desecrated and looted. The church, parish house and the people's refectory are restored, but there is much effort left for the restoration of the interior and to make it available for regular services. The village is part of the ecclesiastical jurisdiction of the Serbian Orthodox Eparchy of Raška and Prizren.

Demographic history
| Ethnic group | 1948 | 1953 | 1961 | 1971 | 1981 | 1991 |
|---|---|---|---|---|---|---|
| Serbs | | | | | 423 (100%) | |
| Total | 449 | 502 | 482 | 473 | 423 | 454 |
