= Boletin =

Boletin Бољетин Boljetin
- Village
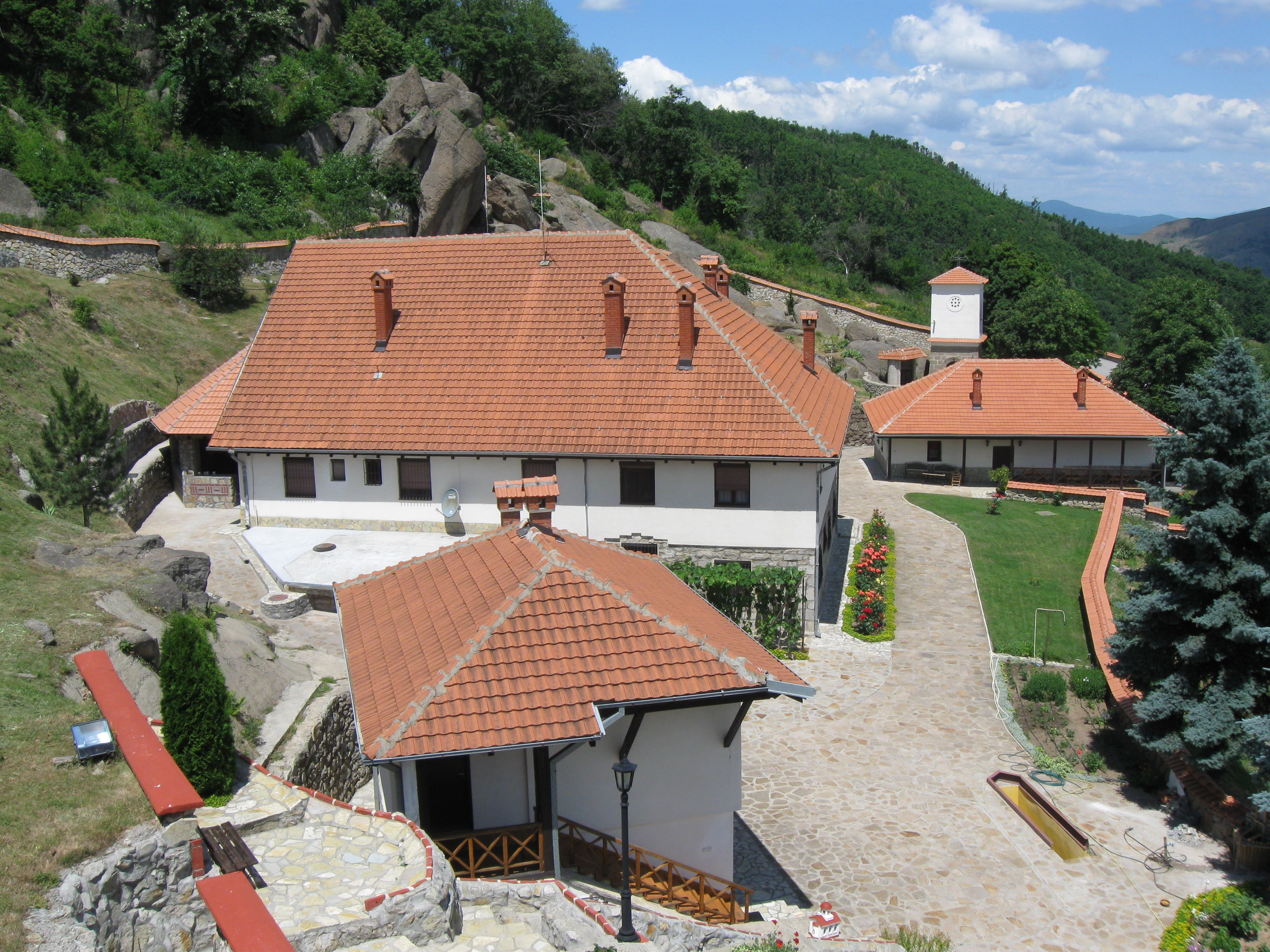
- Sokolica Monastery

- Location in Kosovo
- Coordinates: 42°56′8″N 20°51′26″E
- Location: Kosovo
- District: Mitrovicë
- Municipality: Zveçan
- Time zone: UTC+1 (CET)
  - Summer (DST): UTC+2 (CEST)

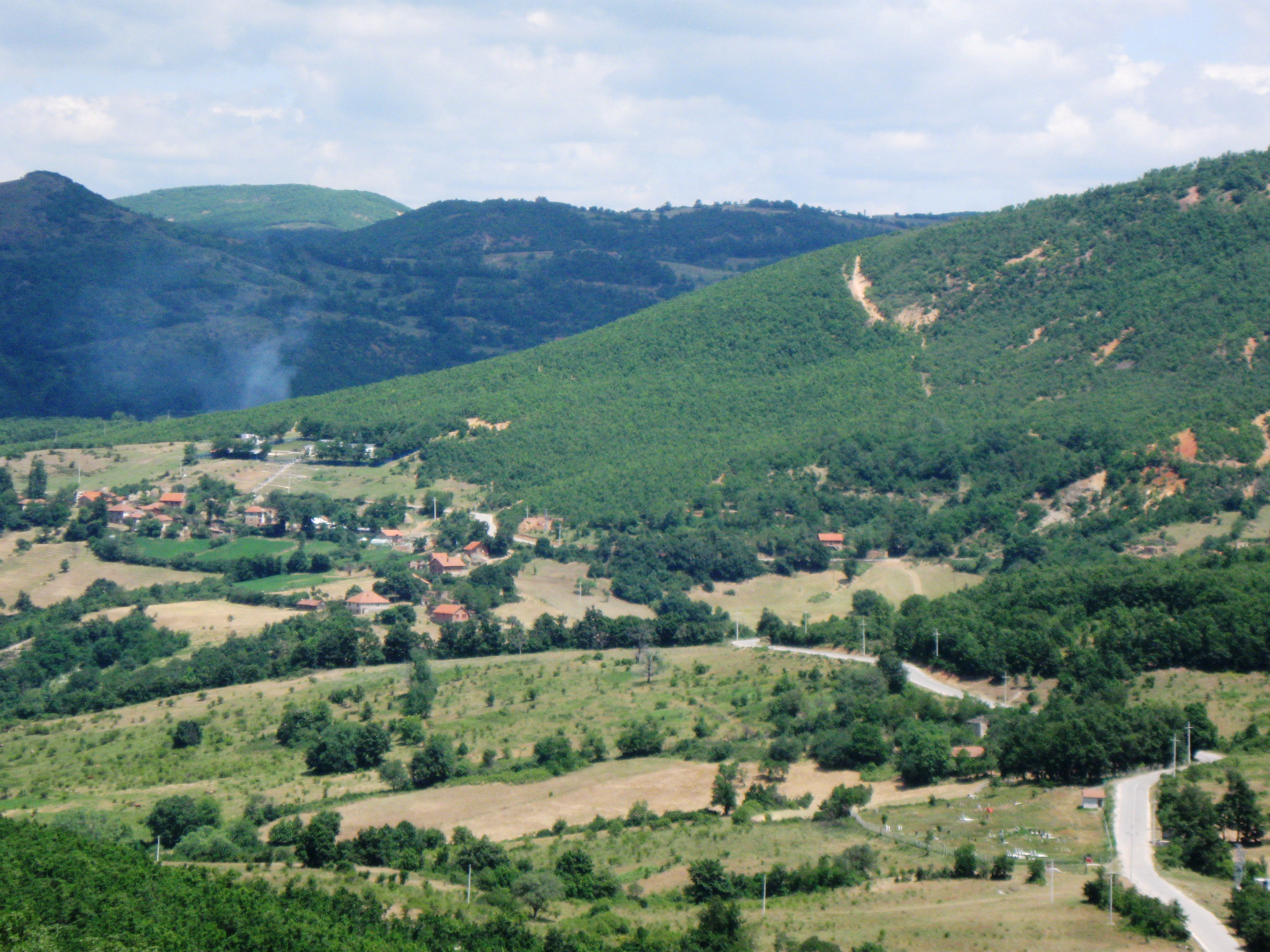
Boletin

Boletin (Albanian definite form: Boletini) or Boljetin (Serbian Cyrillic: Бољетин), is a village in the municipality of Zveçan, Kosovo. It is solely inhabited by Kosovo Albanians.

Isa Boletini, an iconic Albanian nationalist and significant military leader of Albanian independence, was born in the village. He was reburied there on 10 June 2015, nearly a century after his death.

== Notable people ==
- Isa Boletini (1864–1916)
- Pajazit Boletini (1901–1963)
- Salih Boletini ( ? – 1947)
