= Koshtovë, Mitrovica =

Koshtovë Košutovo
- Village
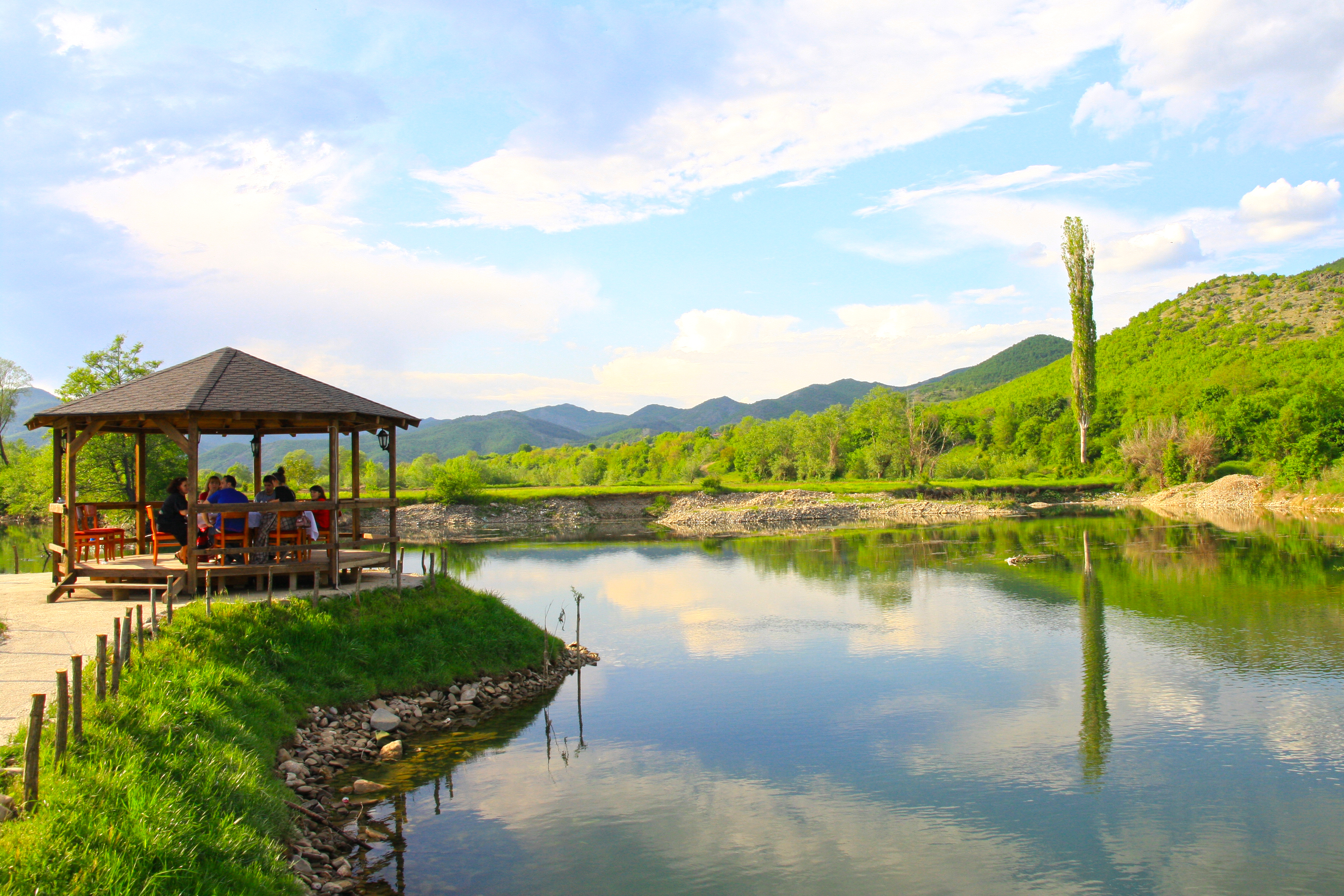

- Location in Kosovo
- Coordinates: 42°52′28″N 20°47′10″E
- Location: Kosovo
- District: Mitrovicë
- Municipality: Mitrovicë
- Elevation: 573 m (1,880 ft)

Population (2024)
  - Total: 1,387
- Time zone: UTC+1 (CET)
  - Summer (DST): UTC+2 (CEST)

Koshtovë is a village in Mitrovicë, Kosovo. It is also known as Koshtova e Bobit or Bobaj named after the Albanian tribe Bobi.

== Demography ==
In 2011 census, the village had in total 1,702 inhabitants, from whom 1,697 ( 99,71 %) were Albanians, three Bosniaks and one other. One was not available.

== Notable people ==
- Avni Hajredini, also known as Avni Koshtova, UÇK member
