= Vaganicë =

Vaganicë: Vaganicë (Albanian); Ваганица/Vaganica (Serbian)
- Village
- Location within Kosovo
- Coordinates: 42°51′23″N 20°51′37″E
- Location: Kosovo
- District: Mitrovicë
- Municipality: Mitrovicë

Population (2024)
  - Total: 2,548
- Time zone: UTC+1 (Central European Time)
  - Summer (DST): UTC+2 (CEST)

Vaganicë (Serbian: Ваганица/Vaganica, Albanian: Vaganicë) is a village in the municipality of Mitrovicë municipality, Kosovo.
