= Kçiq i Madh =

Kçiq i Madh: Kçiq i Madh (Albanian); Велики Кичић/Veliki Kičić (Serbian)
- Village
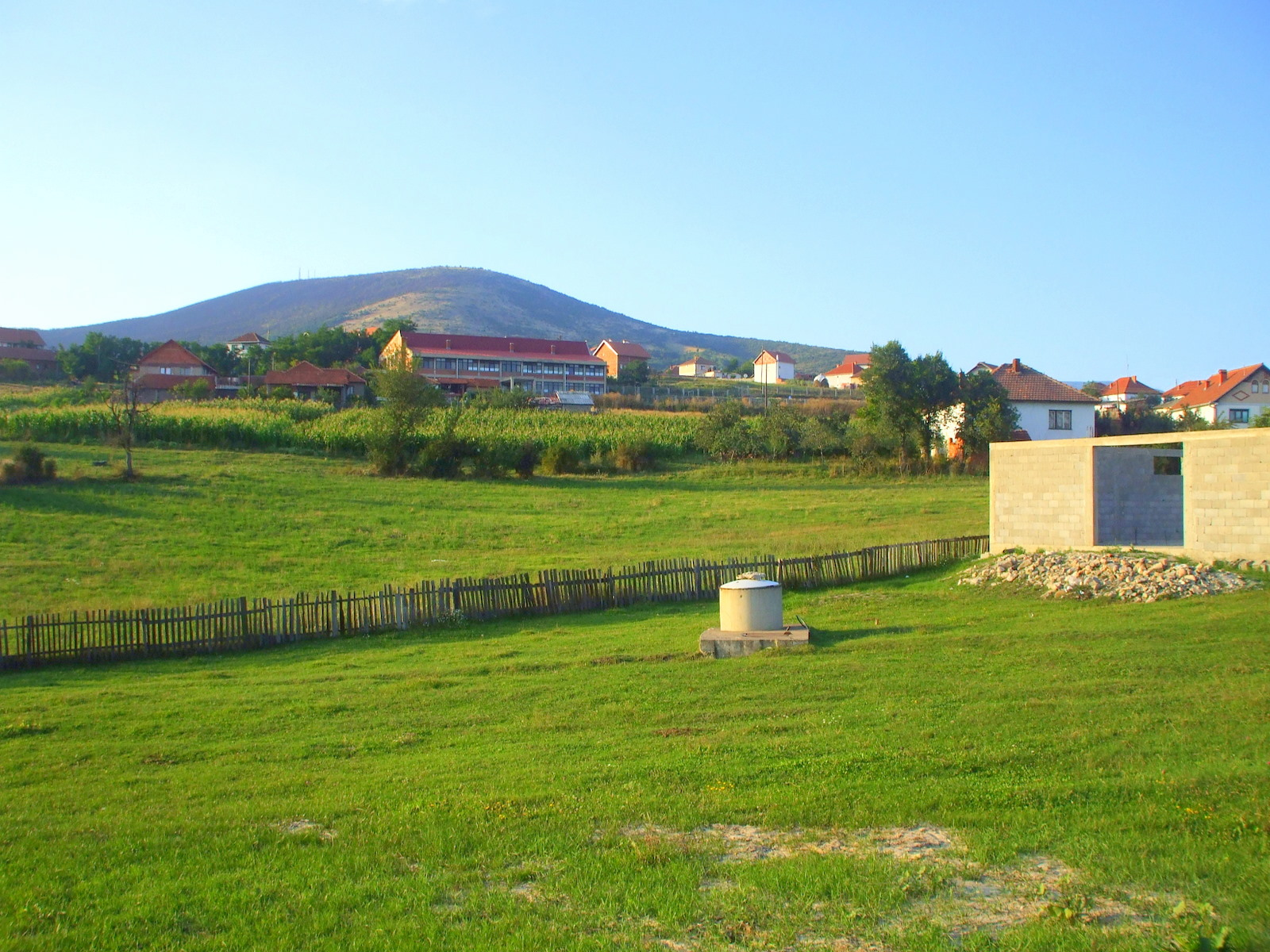

- Location within Kosovo
- Coordinates: 42°52′14″N 20°55′20″E
- Location: Kosovo
- District: Mitrovicë
- Municipality: Mitrovicë

Government
  - Mayor: Fatmir Salihu (PDK)

Population (2024)
  - Total: 2,880
- Time zone: UTC+1 (Central European Time)
  - Summer (DST): UTC+2 (CEST)

Kçiq i Madh (Serbian: Велики Кичић/Veliki Kičić, Albanian: Kçiq i Madh) is a village in the municipality of Mitrovicë municipality, Kosovo.

== Etymology ==
The name of the village derives from the Albanian word Kikë meaning sharp top of a mountain. There are plenty of Albanian Micro-toponyms in Kçiq like Birat e Kishës, Murrizet, Prroni i Kocit, Udha e Shkemzës or Arat e Gata.

== History ==
The village was mentioned as part of the Sanjak of Viçitrina with 61 households.

The village was settled in the 16-17th century by members of the Berisha tribe who fled from Shkodër most possibly due to blood feud. During the Expulsion of the Albanians, 1877–1878, many refugees, called Muhaxhirs, settled. They were originally from Velika Plana or Tupallë.

== Geography ==
Kçiq i Madh is eight kilometers south of Mitrovica and is on the M-2 National Road. The Sitnica, main river in the Kosovo Field, flows through the south of the village.

== Population ==
In 2011, Kçiq i Madh had 3,412 inhabitants. Of these, 3408 are Albanians, one Bosniak and three undeclared. Common surnames are Berisha, Pllana, Fejza, Musliu, Brahimi, Tupella, Imeri etc.

== Sports ==
KF Elektroliza Kçiq was a football club from Kçiq i Madh. They played in the Second League in 2004 being their biggest success.

== Notable people ==
- Butrint Imeri, singer
- Leonard Pllana, football player
- Bujar Pllana, football player
- Ajet Shosholli, former football player and former coach

== See also ==
- Kçiq i Vogël
