= Mitrovica–Peja road =

Location of Peja and Mitrovica in Kosovo

The Mitrovica–Peja road (Albanian: Magjistralja Mitrovicë - Pejë; Serbian: Mitrovica - Peć) or Peja–Mitrovica road was a road of Serbia in the Middle Ages, an extension of the Ibar road. It was used exclusively for caravans. It was reconstructed by the Ottoman authorities prior to the Balkan Wars but due to insecurity it was abandoned. The Serbian government continued the reconstruction mostly after 1919 and in 1925 it became part of the 650 km long Belgrade–Kotor (or "Adriatic") road. It was further reconstructed in 1928.

== Sources ==
- Stanojević, Stanoje (1928). "Narodna enciklopedija srpsko-hrvatsko-slovenačka". pp. 399–400. "Pećsko-Mitrovački put"
