= District of Mitrovica =

District of Kosovo

Coordinates: 42°53′24″N 20°52′12″E

District of Mitrovica: Rajoni i Mitrovicës (Albanian) Косовскомитровачки округ (Serbian)
- District of Kosovo
- Location of Mitrovica District in Kosovo
- Interactive map of District of Mitrovica
- Country: Kosovo
- Capital: Mitrovica

Area
  - Total: 2,077 km^{2} (802 sq mi)

Population (2024)
  - Total: 190,591
  - Rank: 3rd
  - Density: 91.76/km^{2} (237.7/sq mi)
- Postal code: 40000
- Vehicle registration: 02
- Municipalities: 7
- Settlements: 267
- HDI (2023): 0.802 very high · 2nd

Mitrovica District (Albanian: Rajoni i Mitrovicës; Serbian Cyrillic: Косовскомитровачки округ) is one of the seven districts of Kosovo. Its administrative center and largest city is Mitrovica. The district borders on the District of Peja to the south-west, the District of Pristina to the south and east, and Serbia to the north and northwest.

== History ==
=== Antiquity ===
The first human habitations here can be traced back to the Prehistoric period. Some Neolithic sites have been discovered in the Mitrovica District, such as in Runik, Žitkovac-Karagaç, Vallaç and Fafos. This region was populated by Dardanians, an Illyrian tribe that lived in the territory of modern-day Kosovo.

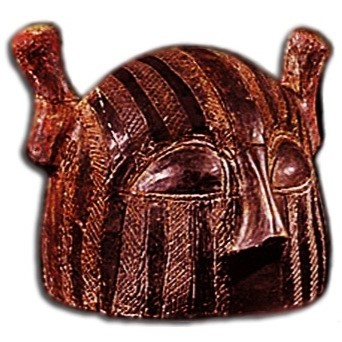
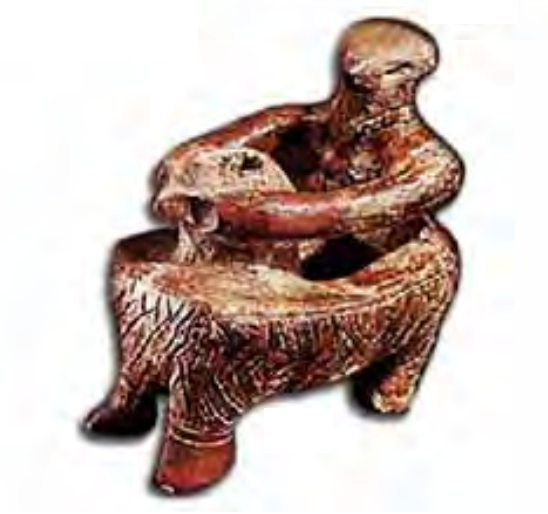
The prosopomorphic lid (left) and the centaur figurine (right) found in the Fafos archeological site

By the end of the 1st century BC, the Romans invaded the region. At the time, one of the most important centres in the region was Municipium Dardanorum, located in Sočanica, Leposavić. Archeological sites from the Roman period were also found in the territory of Vushtrri (Viciana), for example the ruins in Pestova and the Rashan Fortress.

Following the fall of the Roman Empire, the Mitrovica was fell into the Byzantine Empire. During the Justinian I period (527-565AD), the Old Fortress in Vushtrri was built, which remains the city center today.

=== Middle Ages ===
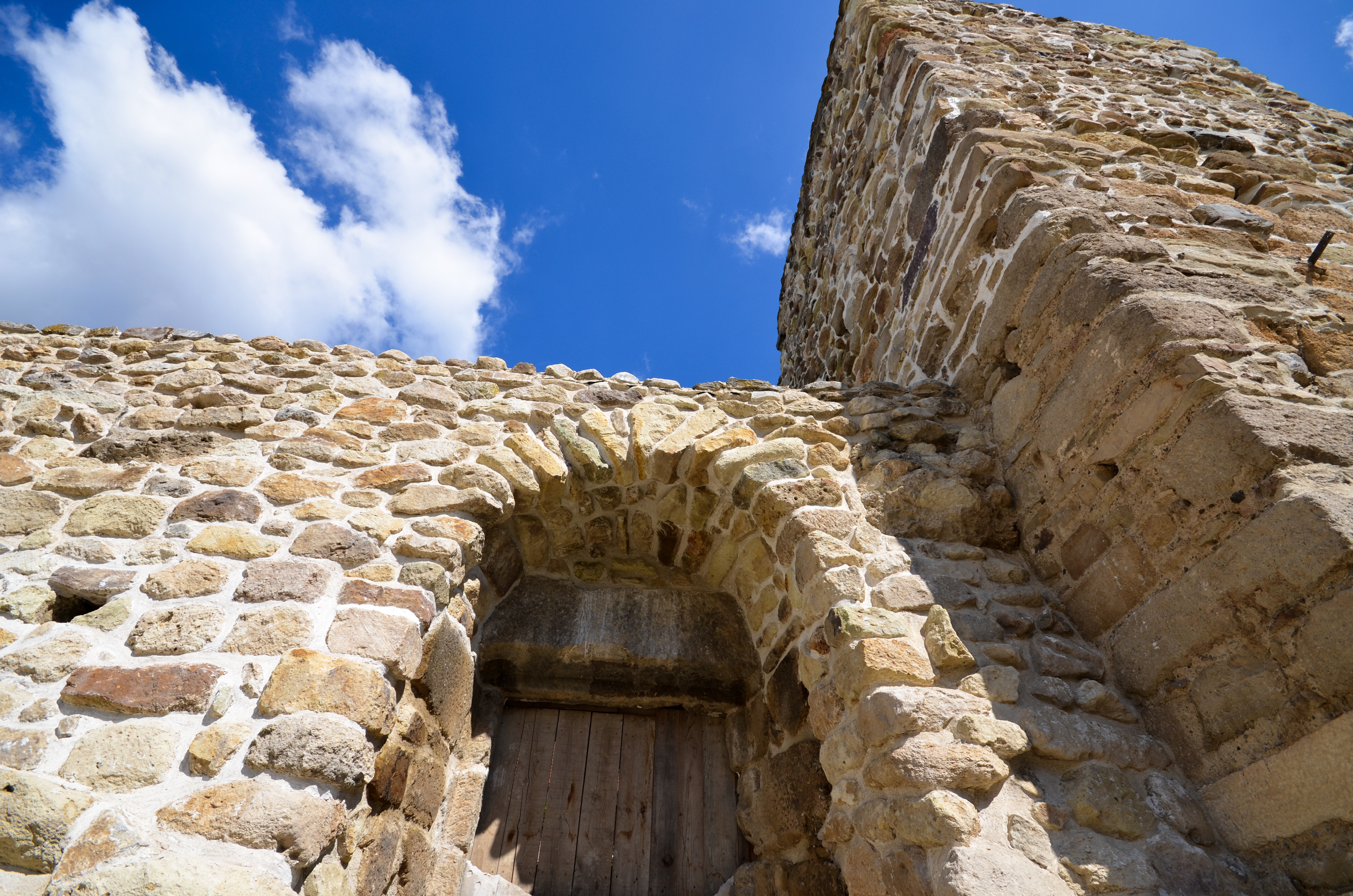
The Vushtrri Castle

By the end of the 9th century, the region of Mitrovica became part of the Bulgarian state of Samuel. The area was conquered by the Nemanjić dynasty in 1185. During Serbian rule, the region and Kosovo in general became a political and spiritual centre of the kingdom. The Ottomans later conquered the region in the 14th century and stayed until the 17th century. During this Ottoman period, Islam spread and many mosques, hammams ("Turkish baths"), madrasah, bridges and Ottoman houses were built. The cities of Vushtrri, Mitrovica and Zvečan became some of the largest cities in the region, and some of the most important in the Ottoman Empire.

=== 20th century ===
In 1912, after the Ottoman capitulation, Serbia acquired the territory of Kosovo. In the first World War, the region was part of the Austro-Hungarian Empire (1915–18), then part of the Kingdom of Serbs, Croats and Slovenes. In World War II, Germany conquered most of the territory in the region, while other areas fell to the Italians. After World War II, the economy grew in the region under Yugoslavia.

== Geography ==
=== Relief ===
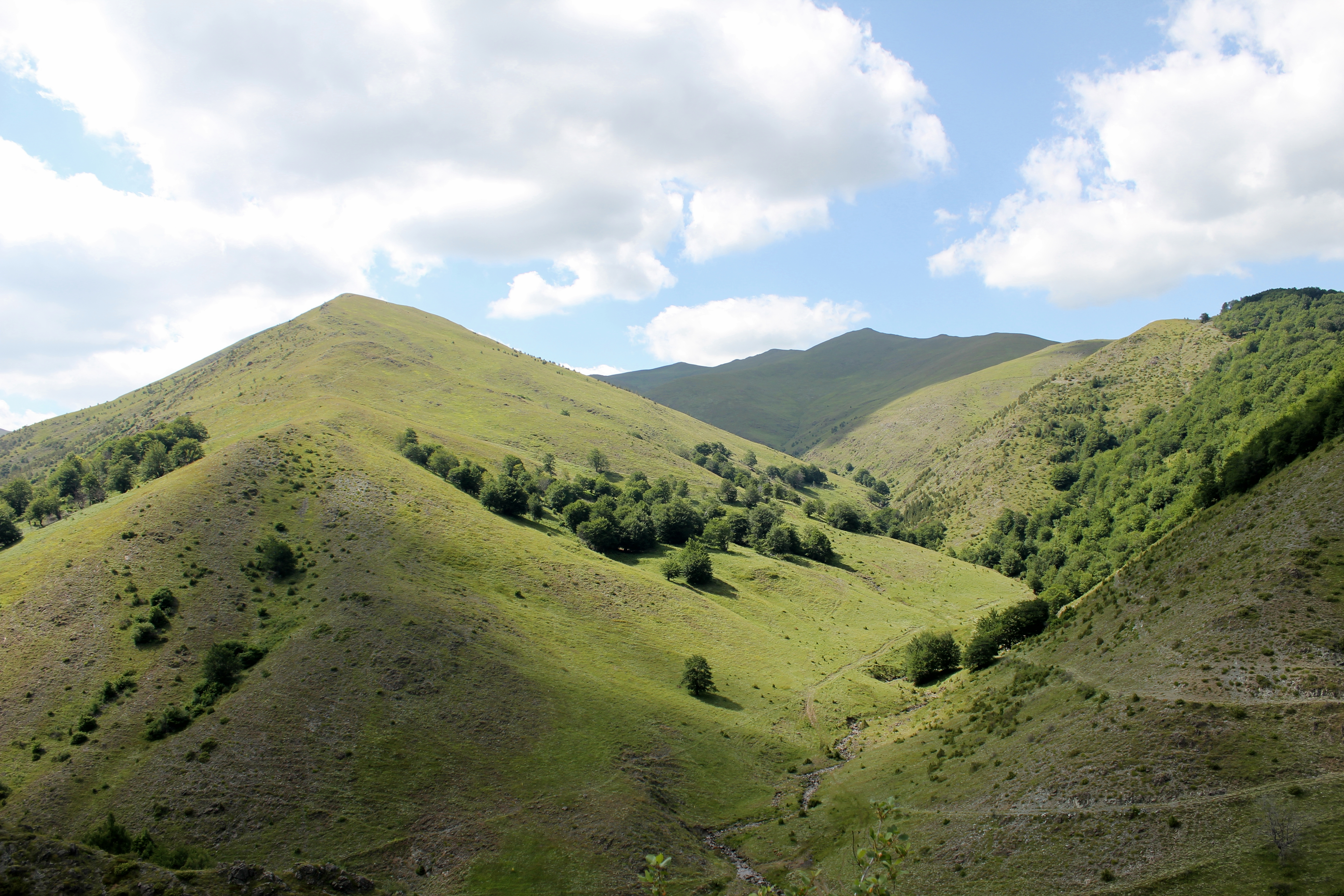
The Kopaonik mountains in the region called Shala e Bajgorës

The terrain of the Mitrovica District is rugged and mountainous, comprising the south portion of Kopaonik mountain on the north-east, with the highest point Pančić's Peak 2,017 meters above sea level (the northernmost extremity of Kosovo). The mountain ranges of Rogozna and Mokra Gora extend on the north-west by Zubin Potok with the peak of Berim, 1,731 meters (5,679 ft). The northern part of Drenica and Qyqavica mountain occupies the south-west part of region, while in the south east the boundary extends on the Plain of Kosovo. In the center of the region is the Ibar valley, where Mitrovica lies.

=== Hydrography ===
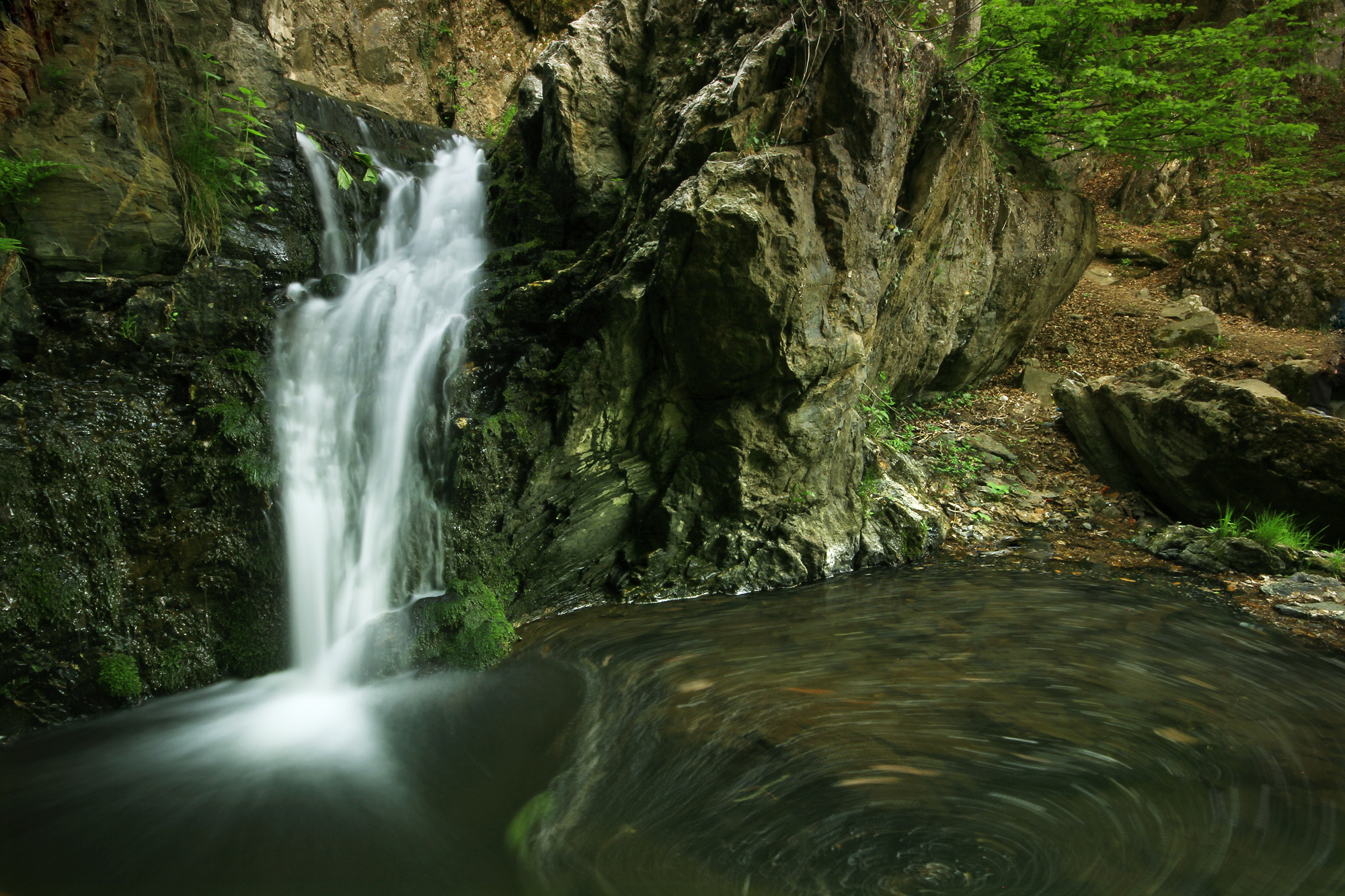
Waterfall in Bajgora

Regarding hydrography, Mitrovica District constitutes one of the richest regions in Kosovo. While a mountainous area, there are many small river sources in the region, and two of the most important rivers in Kosovo, Ibar and Sitnica, flow here.

Ibar originates in Rožaje, eastern Montenegro, passes through Sandžak and enters Kosovo by the town of Zubin Potok. Near this town, the river is dammed by the Gazivoda Dam, creating the artificial Lake Gazivode.

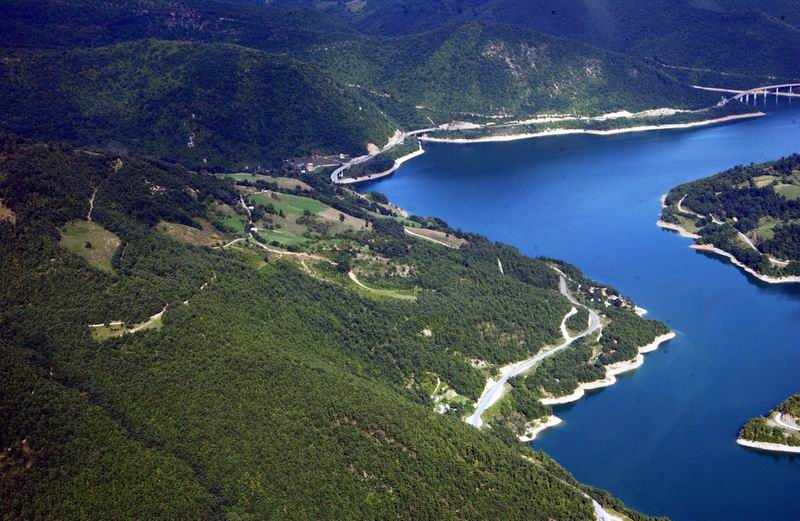
Gazivoda Lake, Zubin Potok

As the largest lake in Kosovo (area 11.9 km2 or 4.6 sq mi, altitude 693 m or 2,274 ft, depth 105 m or 344 ft), Gazivoda Lake represents one of the most important assets of Kosovo's economy. Below Gazivode, another reservoir is created, Lake Pridvorice. In Mitrovica, the Ibar receives Lushta river and Sitnica, which consist of the longest river in Kosovo. Sitnica passes through the town of Vushtrri what makes an important element for agriculture in this area. In Mitrovica it receives Trepça river which originates from Bajgora mountains, of Kopaonik range.

== Demographics ==
=== Population ===
According to the official census of 2024 by the Kosovo Agency of Statistics, the district of Mitrovica has a population of 190,591. The majority of the population is concentrated in the municipalities of Mitrovica, Vushtrri and Skenderaj. The largest municipality is Mitrovica (64,742 inhabitants) and the smallest Zveçan (2,867 inhabitants).

Municipality	Population (2024)	Area (km2)
Mitrovica	64,742	350
Vushtrri	61,528	344
Skenderaj	40,664	378
Leposavić	9,485	539
North Mitrovica	7,920	11
Zubin Potok	3,385	333
Zvečan	2,867	122
Mitrovica District	190,591	2,077

=== Ethnicities ===
The municipalities of Mitrovica, Vushtrri and Skenderaj have an Albanian majority, whilst the municipalities of North Mitrovica, Zubin Potok, Zvečan and Leposavić have an ethnic Serb majority.

Municipality	Total	Ethnicity									
Municipality	Total	Albanians	Serbs	Turks	Bosniaks	Romani	Ashkali	Egyptians	Gorani	Others	Prefer not to Answer
Mitrovica	64,742	62,693	18	257	278	372	1 012	47	10	43	12
Vushtrri	61,528	60,847	207	230	22	129	45	0	0	32	16
Skenderaj	40,664	40 389	223	5	15	2	3	8	0	11	8
Leposavić	9,485	178	8,648	3	344	0	0	0	0	156	156
North Mitrovica	7,920	1,489	5,594	85	360	1	29	0	104	221	37
Zubin Potok	3,385	682	2,702	0	0	0	0	0	1	0	0
Zvečan	2,867	360	2,505	0	2	0	0	0	0	0	0

=== Official languages ===
In the municipalities of Mitrovica Region, Albanian and Serbian languages are official languages, while in Mitrovica and Vushtrri, Turkish is recognized as a language in official use.

== Administrative divisions ==
=== Municipalities ===
Until 2012 the district of Mitrovica was divided into six municipalities. In 2013, after November elections in Kosovo, North Mitrovica officially became a separate municipality.

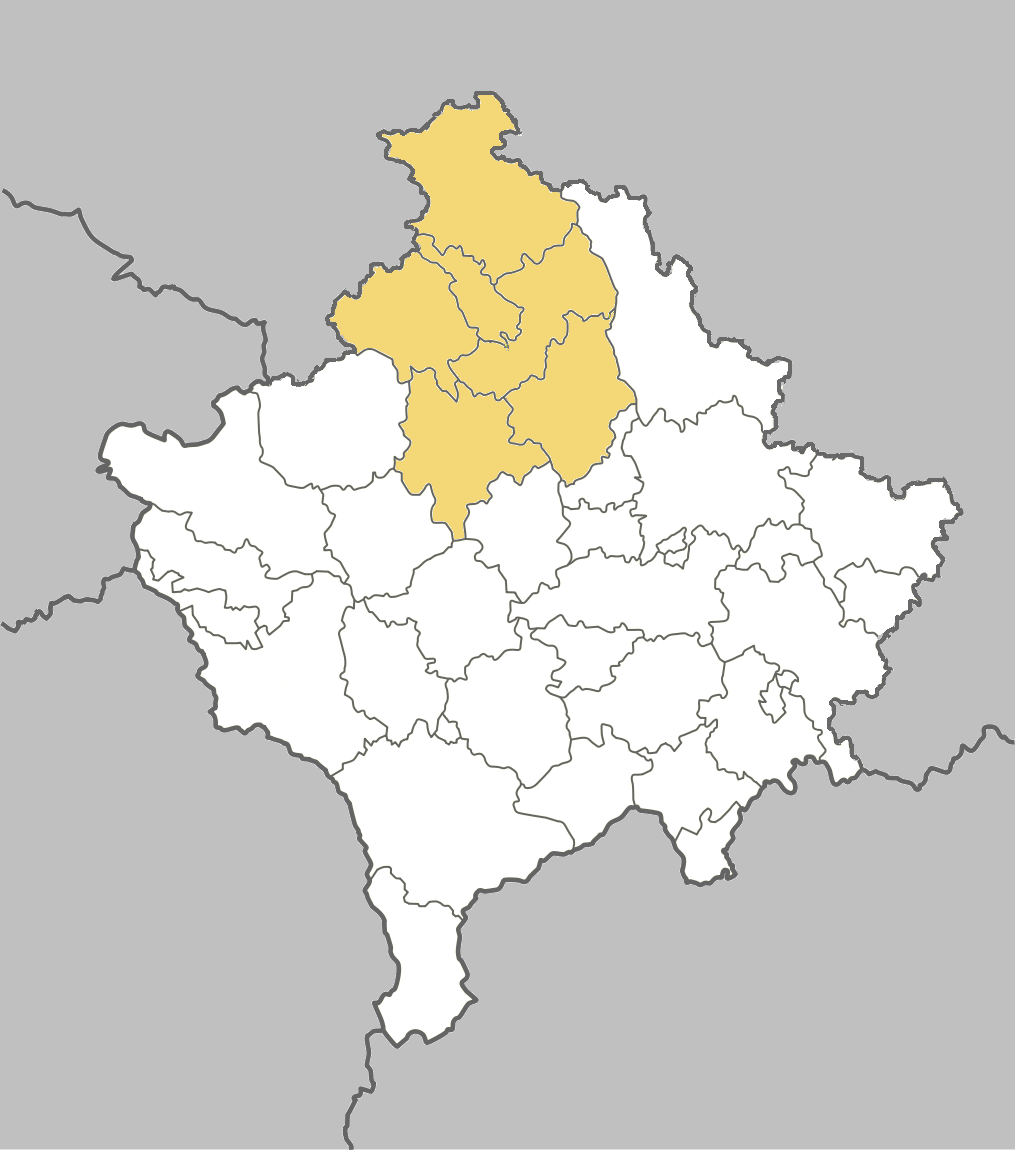

=== Settlements in Mitrovica District ===
This is the list of 48 settlements in the municipality of Mitrovica.

- Bajgorë/Bajgora
- Barë/Bare
- Batahir/Bataire
- Braboniq/Brabonjić
- Dedi/Dedinje
- Frashër/Svinjare
- Gushac/Gušavac
- Kaçandoll/Kačandol
- Kçiq i Madh/Veliki Kičić
- Kçiq i Vogël/Malo Kičić
- Koprivë/Kopriva
- Koshtovë/Košutovo
- Kovaçicë/Kovačica
- Kutlloc/Kutlovac
- Lisicë/Lisica
- Lushtë/Ljušta
- Magjerë/Mađare
- Mazhiq/Mažić
- Melenicë/Meljenica
- Mitrovicë/Kosovska Mitrovica
- Ovçar/Ovčare
- Pirç/Pirče
- Rahovë/Orahovo
- Rashan/Gornje Rašane
- Rekë/Reka
- Rrzhanë/Ržana
- Selac/Seljance
- Shipol/Šipolje
- Shupkoc/Šupkovac
- Stantërg/Stari Trg
- Stranë/Strana
- Suhodoll i Epërm/Gornji Suvi Do
- Suhodoll i Poshtëm/Donji Suvi Do
- Tërstenë/Trstena
- Tunel i Parë/Prvi Tunel
- Vaganicë/Vaganica
- Vërbnicë/Vrbnica
- Vidishiq/Vidušić
- Vidomiriq/Vidomirić
- Vinarc i Epërm/Gornje Vinarce
- Vinarc i Poshtëm/Donje Vinarce
- Vllahi/Vlahinje
- Zabërgjë/Zabrđe
- Zasellë(Kodër)/Zasela
- Zhabar i Epërm/Gornje Žabare
- Zhabar i Poshtëm/Donje Žabare
- Zijaçë/Zijača

This is the list of 67 settlements in the municipality of Vushtrri.

- Akrashticë/Okraštica
- Balincë/Balince
- Banjskë/Banjska
- Beçiq/Bečić
- Beçuk/Benčuk
- Begaj/Novo Selo Begovo
- Bivolak/Bivoljak
- Boshlan/Bošljane
- Brusnik
- Bukosh/Bukoš
- Ceceli/Cecelija
- Dalak/Doljak
- Dobërllukë/Dobra Luka
- Druar/Drvare
- Duboc/Dubovac
- Dumnicë e Epërme/Gornja Dubnica
- Dumnicë e Llugave/Lug Dubnica
- Dumnicë e Poshtme /Donja Dubnica
- Galicë/Galica
- Gllavatin/Glavotina
- Gojbulë/Gojbulja
- Gracë/Grace
- Gumnishtë/Gumnište
- Hercegovë/Hercegovo
- Karaçë/Karače
- Kollë/Kolo
- Kunovik
- Kurillovë/Kurilovo
- Liqej/Jezero
- Lumadh/Velika Reka
- Mavriq/Mavrić
- Maxhunaj/Novo Selo Mađunsko
- Mihaliq/Mijalić
- Miraçë/Miroče
- Nevolan/Nevoljane
- Nedakoc/Nedakovac
- Oshlan]/Ošljane
- Pantinë/Pantina
- Pasomë/Pasoma
- Pestovë/Pestovo
- Prelluzhë/Prilužje
- Reznik/Resnik
- Ropicë/Ropica
- Samadrexhë/Samodreža
- Sfaraçak i Epërm/Gornji Svračak
- Sfaraçak i Poshtëm/Donji Svračak
- Shalë/Šalce
- Shlivovicë/Šljivovica
- Shtitaricë/Štitarica
- Skoçan/Skočna
- Skromë/Skrovna
- Sllakoc/Slakovce
- Sllatinë/Slatina
- Smrekonicë/Smrekovnica
- Stanoc i Epërm/Gornje Stanovce
- Stanoc i Poshtëm/Donje Stanovce
- Stroc/Strovce
- Studime e Epërme/Gornja Sudimlja
- Studime e Poshtme/Donja Sudimlja
- Taraxhë/Taradža
- Tërllabuq/Trlabuć
- Vërmicë /Vrnica
- Vesekoc/Vesekovce
- Vilanc/Viljance
- Vushtrri
- Zagorë/Zagorje
- Zhilivodë/Žilivoda

== Gallery ==
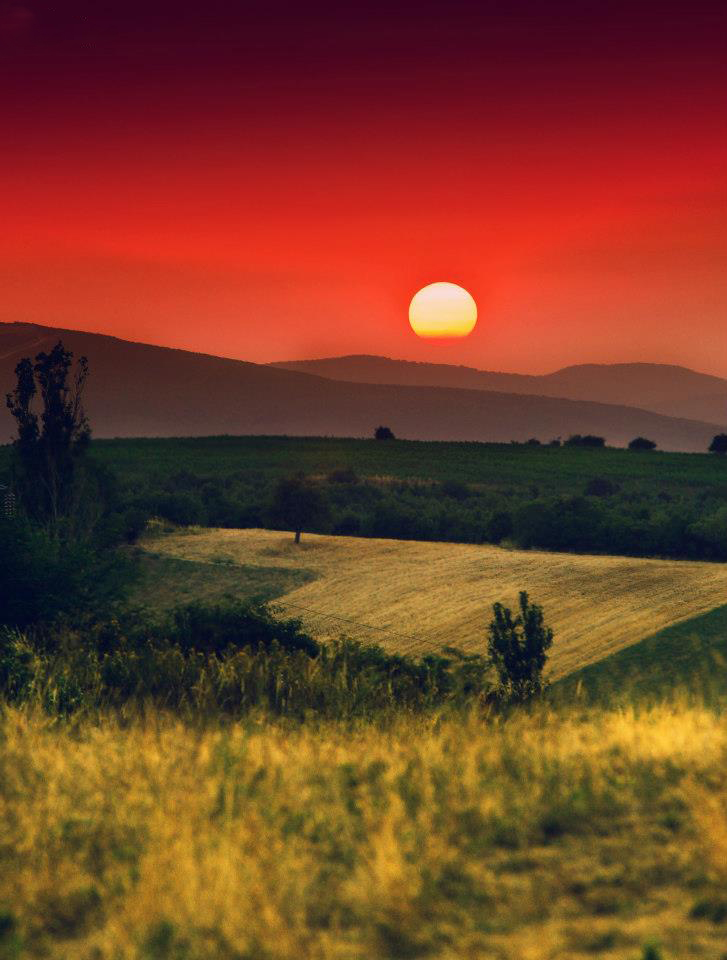
Landscape near Vushtrri

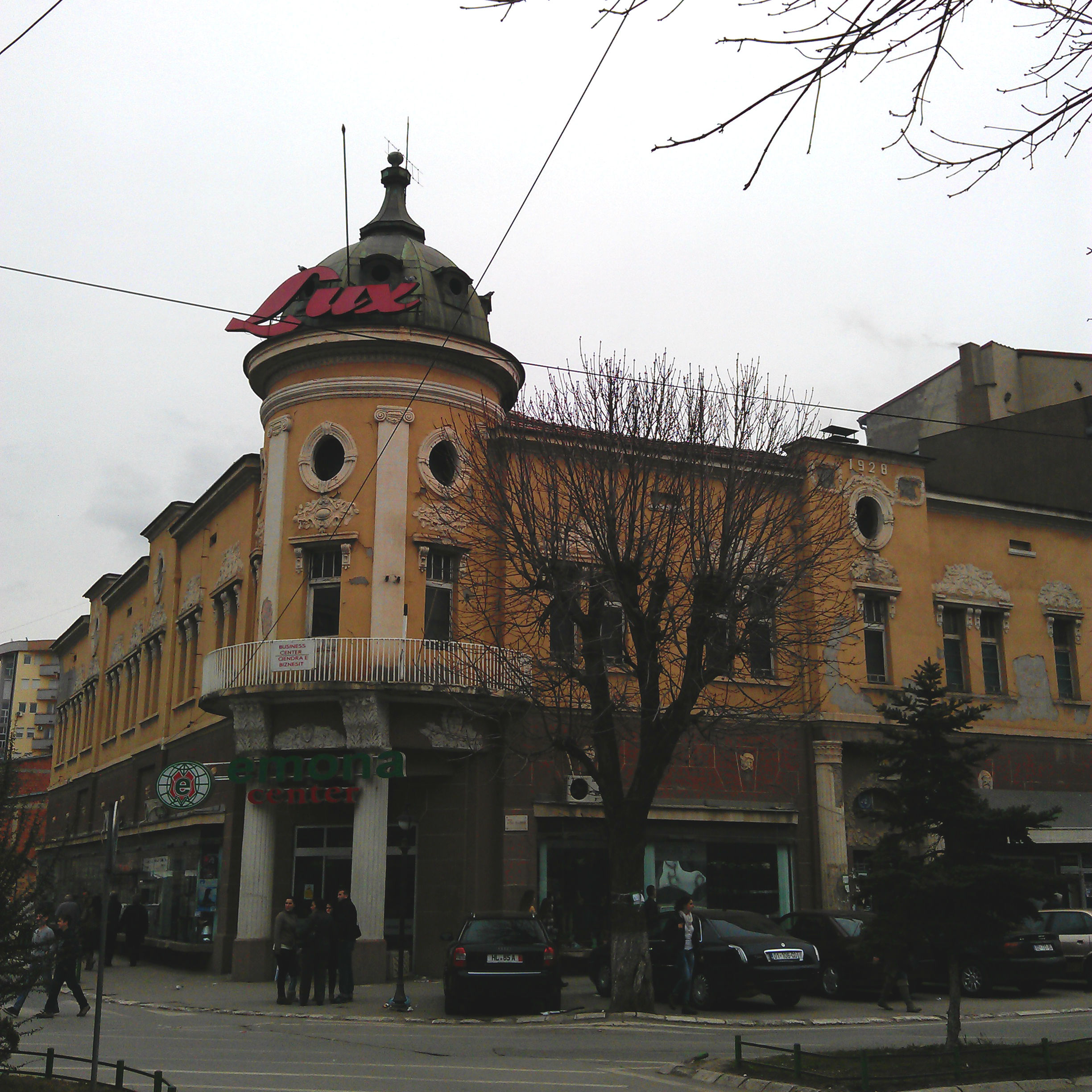
Hotel Jadran building in Mitrovica

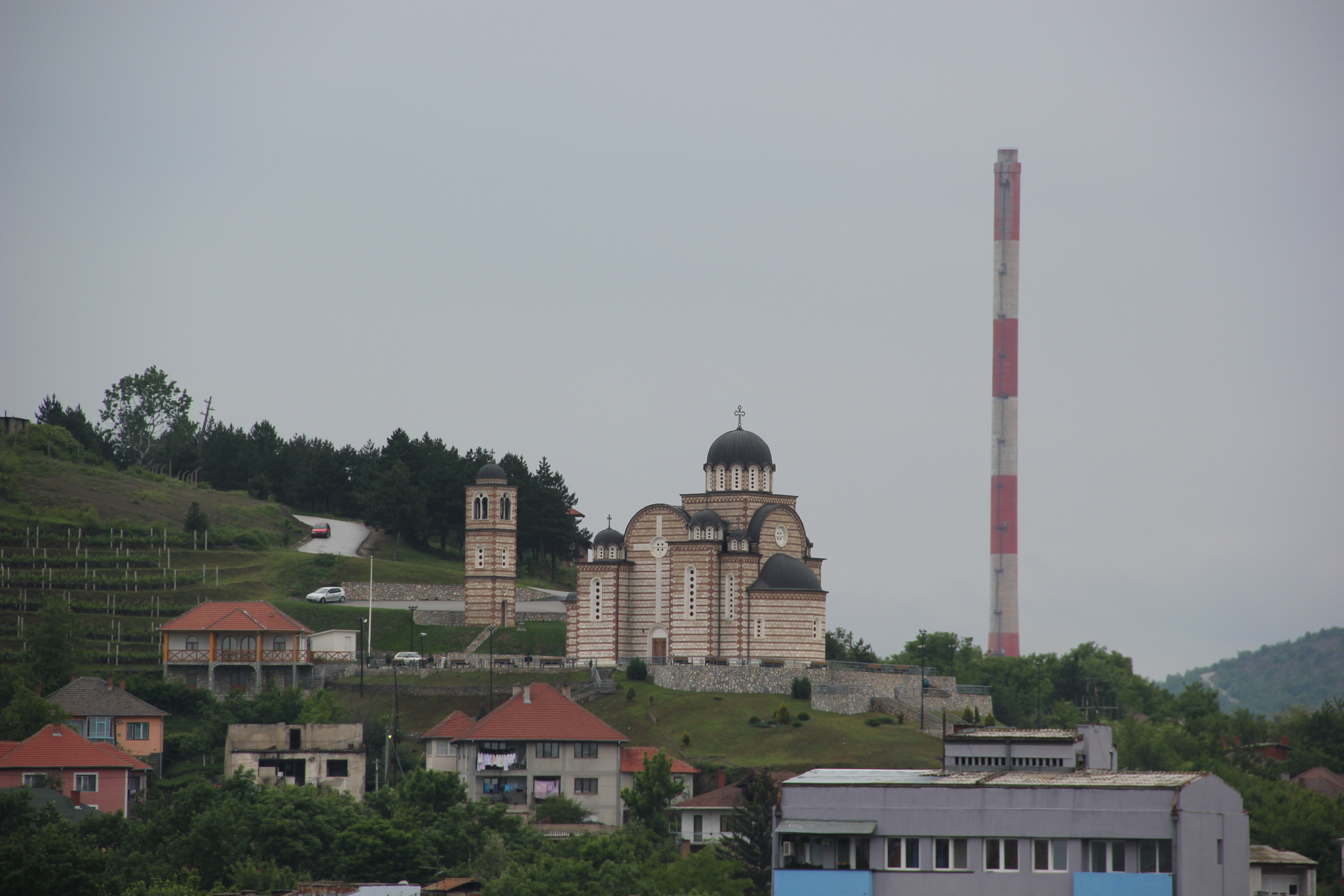
Orthodox Church and Zvecan lead smelter chimney

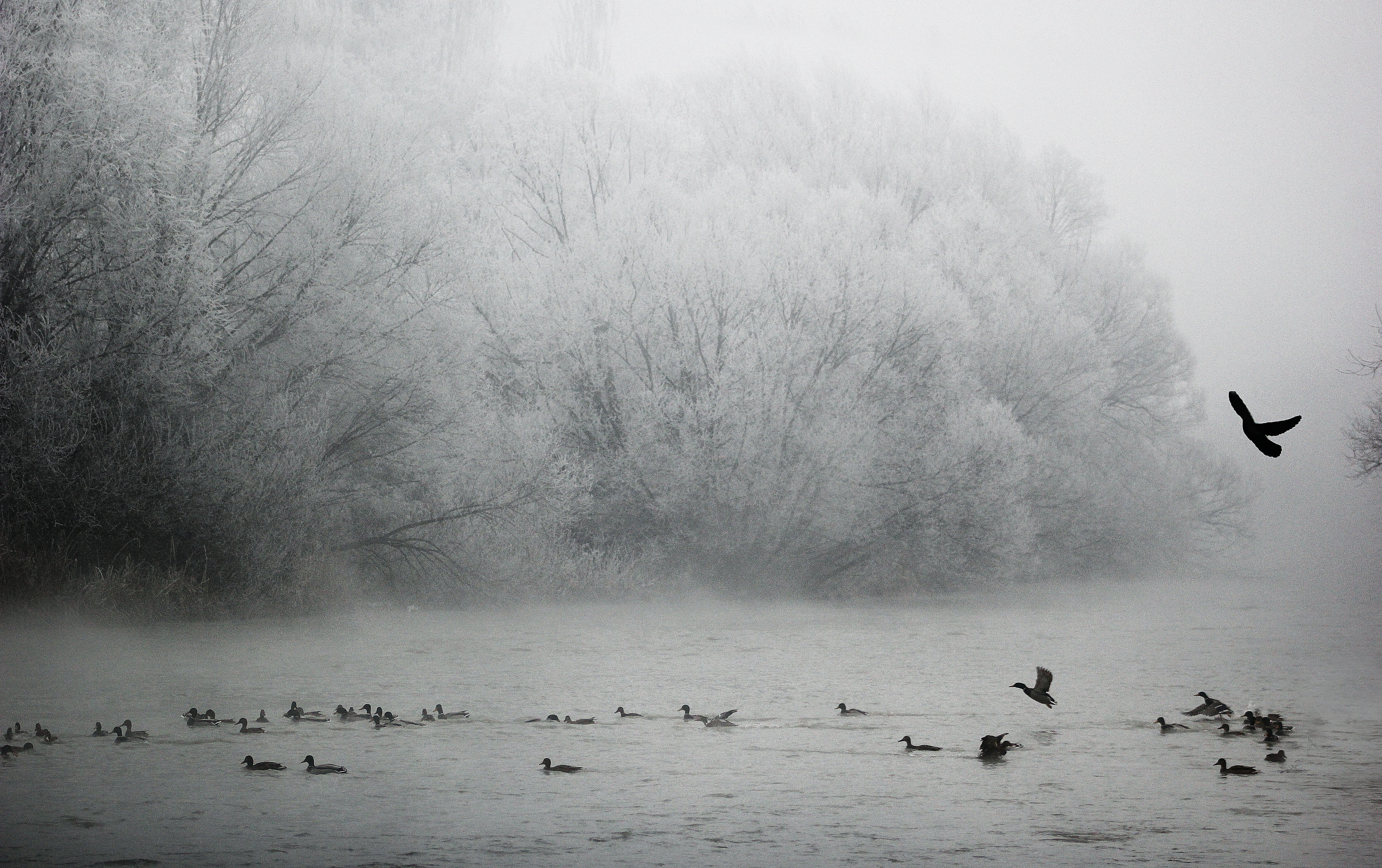
Ibar River in Mitrovica

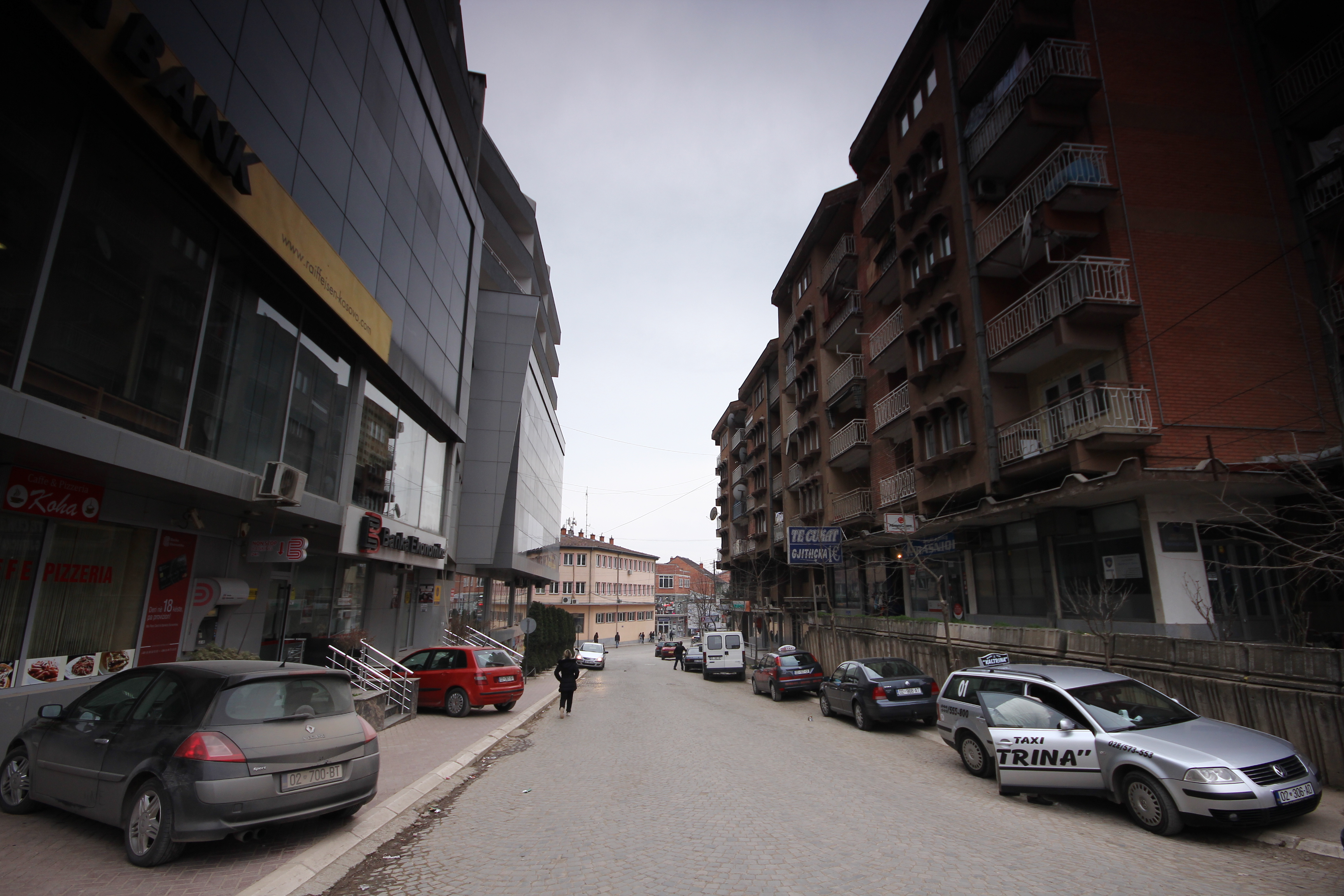
City of Vushtrri

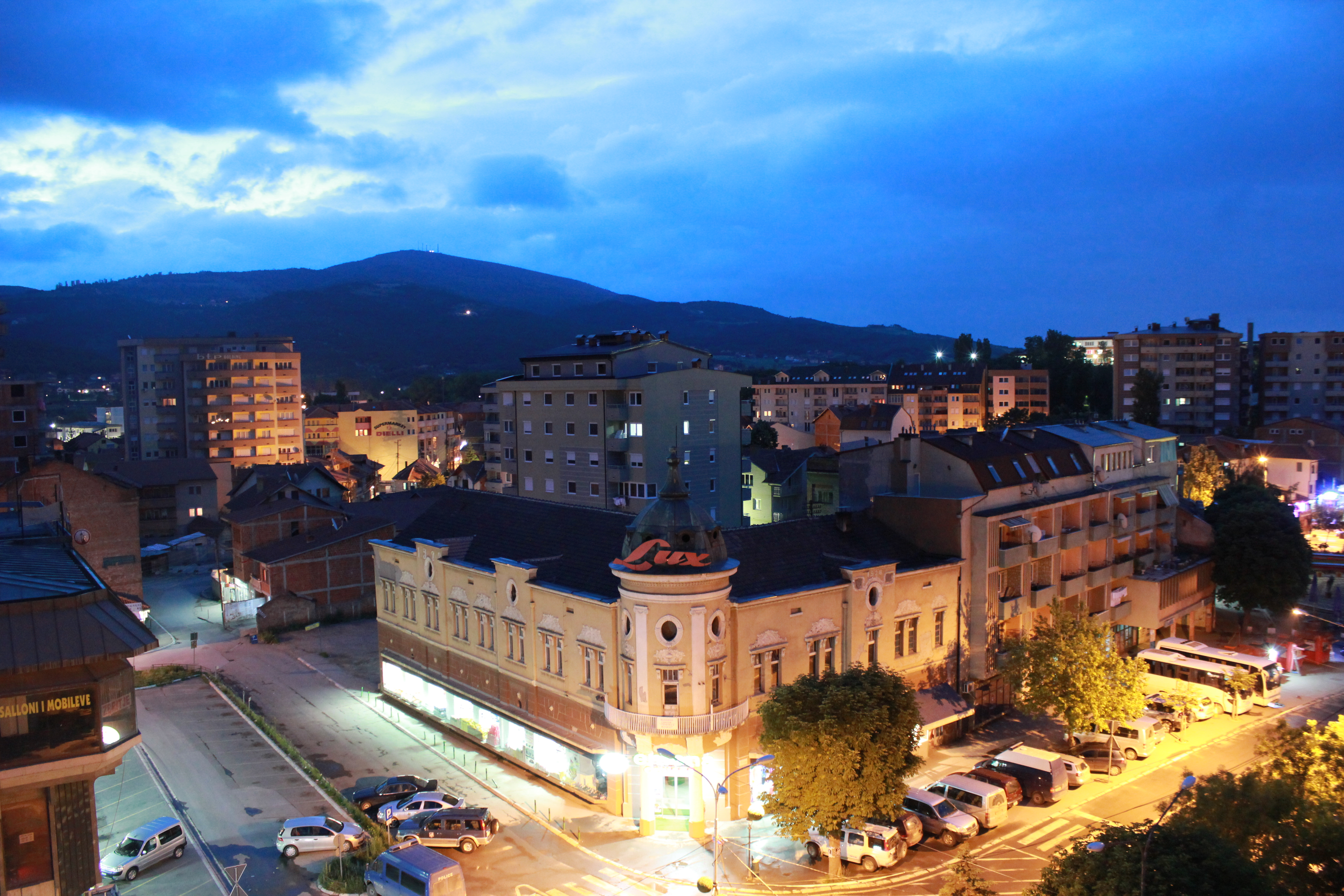
Hotel Jadran building in Mitrovica

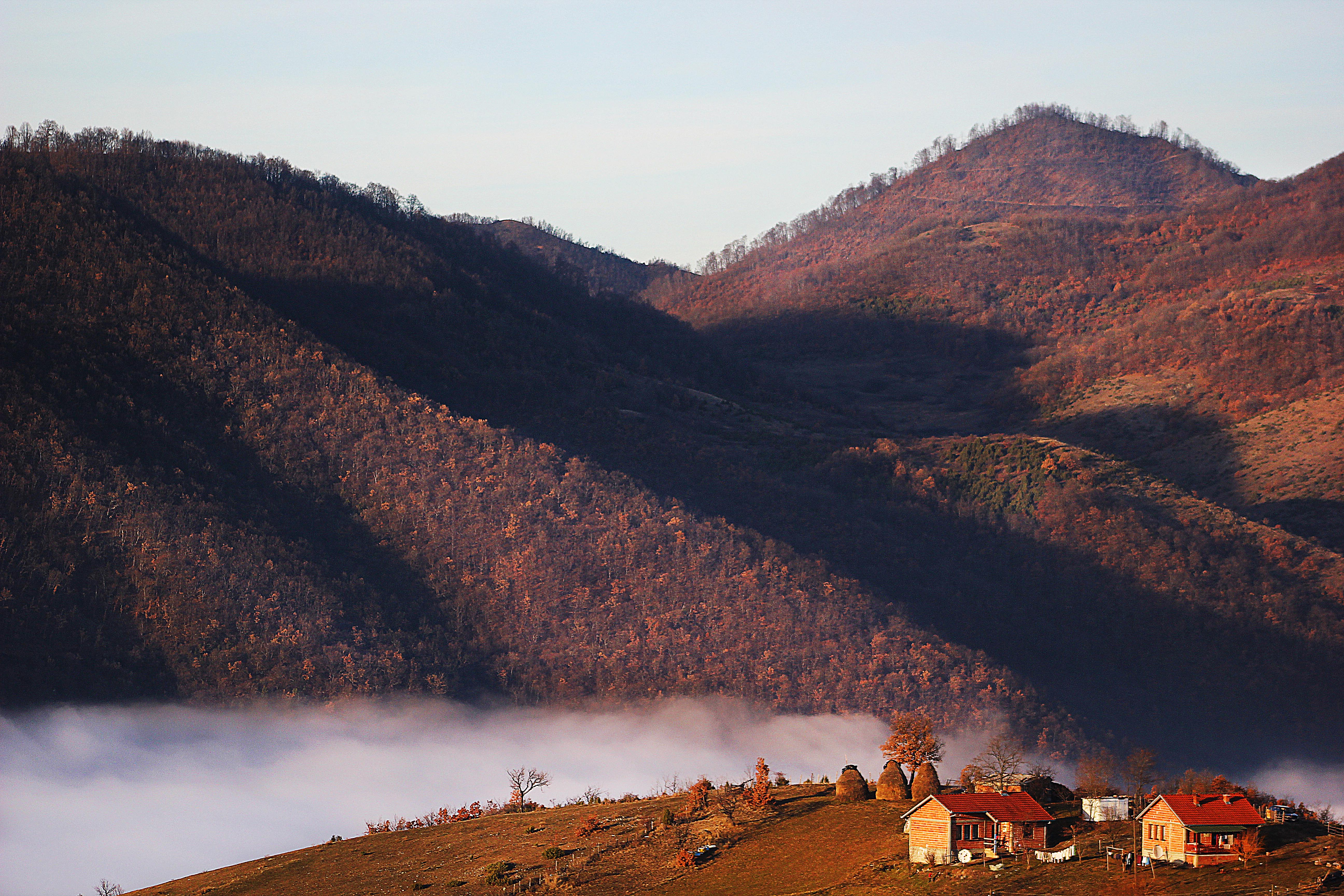
Cerajë village

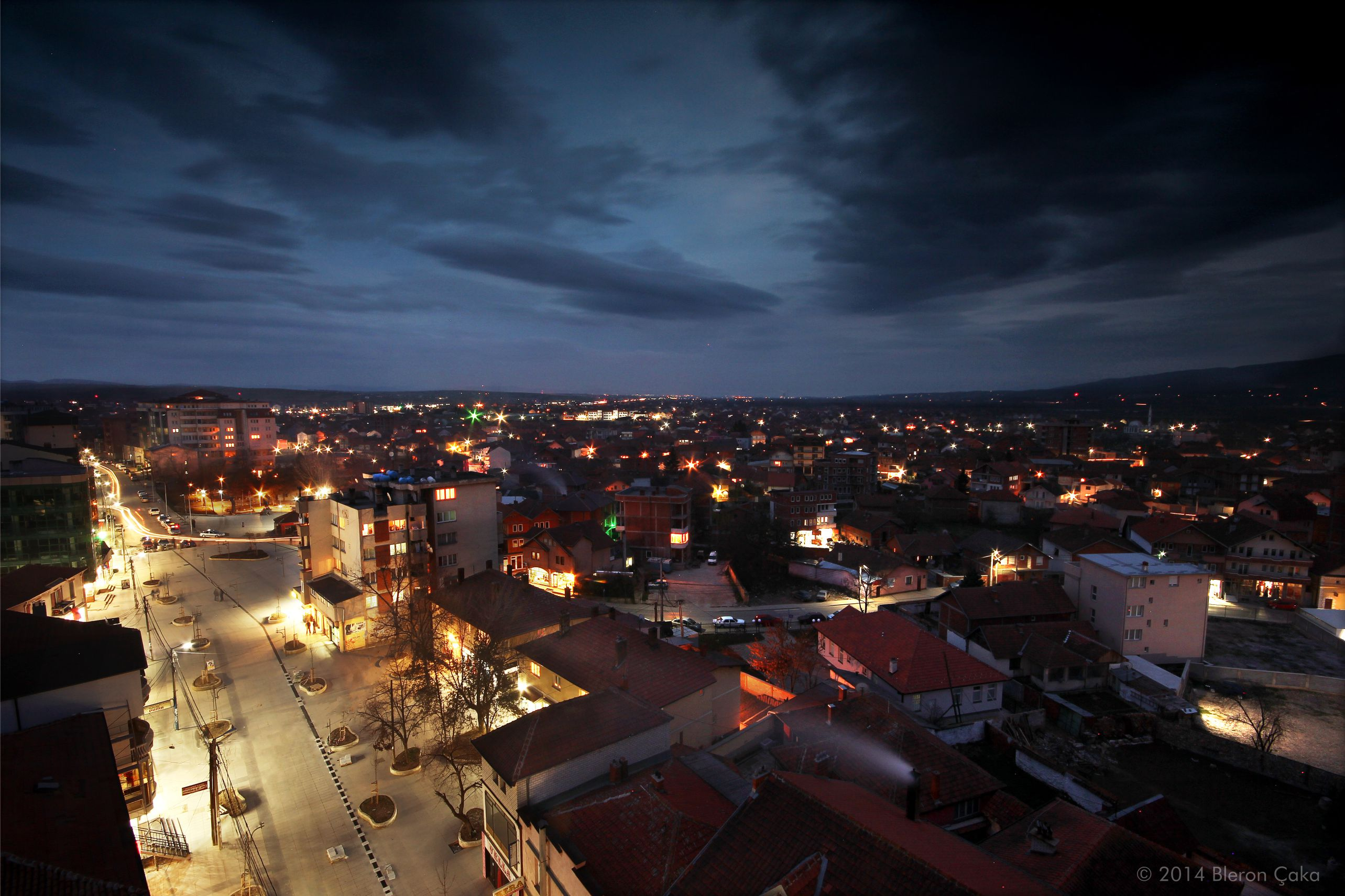
City of Vushtrri at night

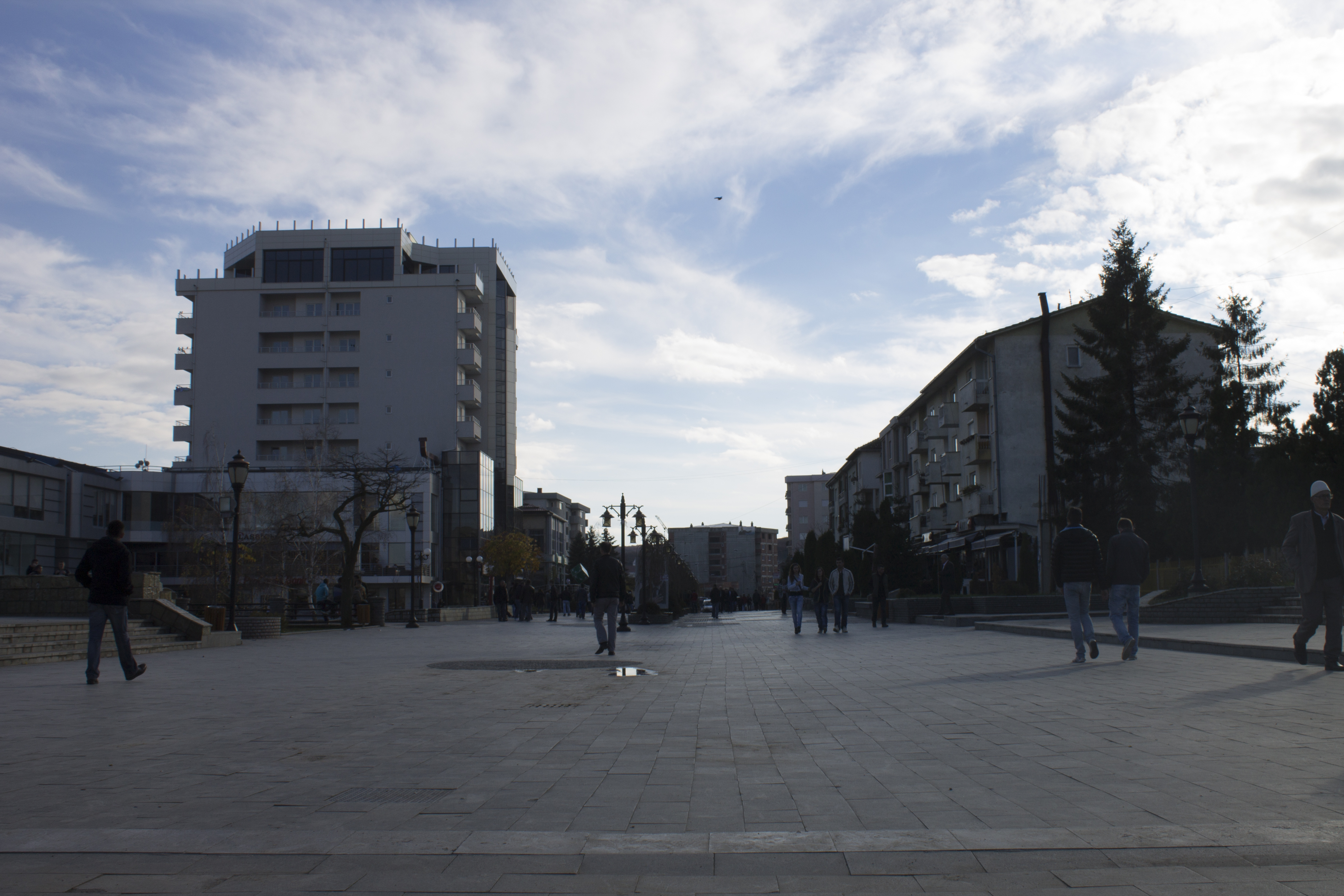
"Adem Jashari" square in Skenderaj

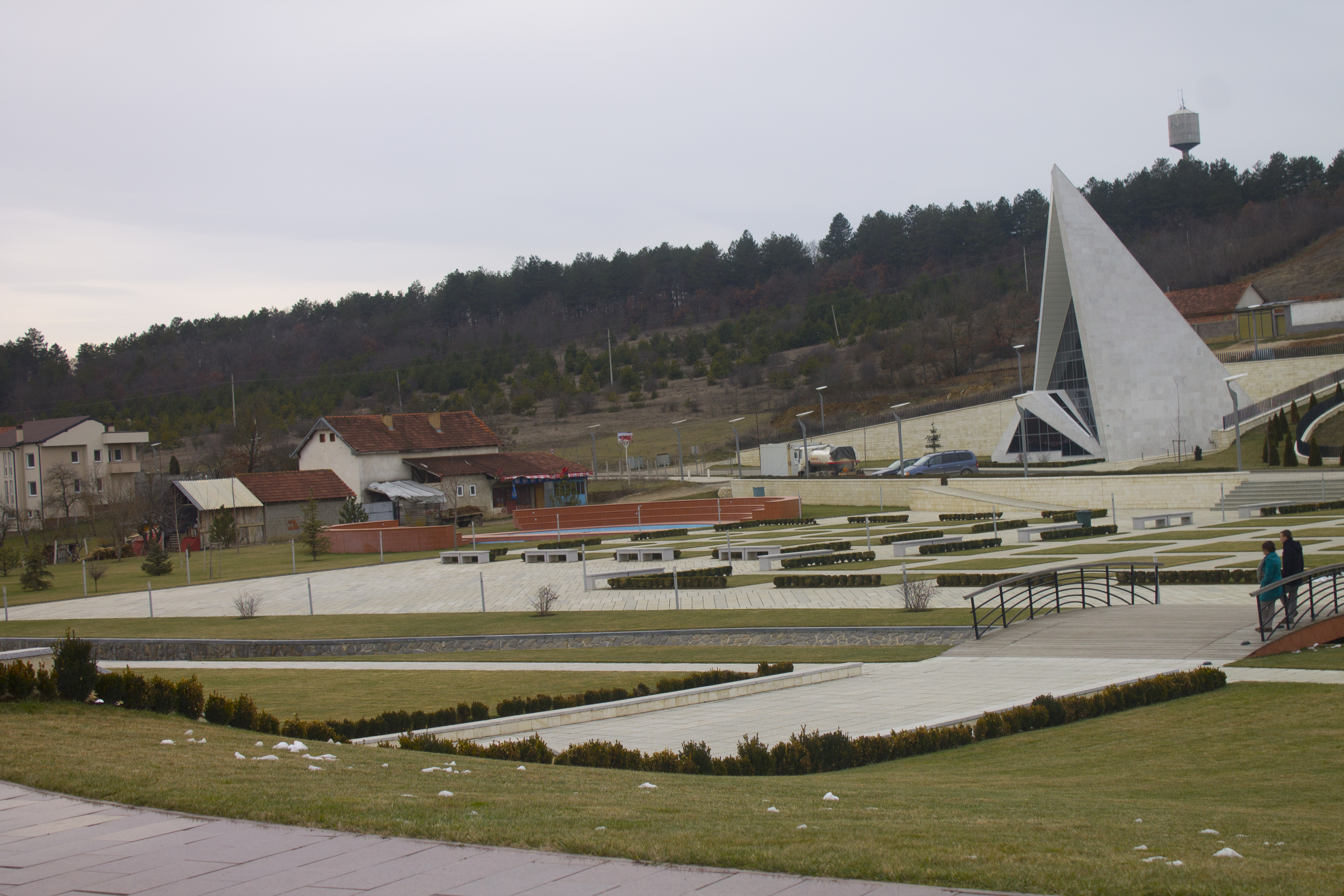
Adem Jashari memorial in Prekaz i Epërm

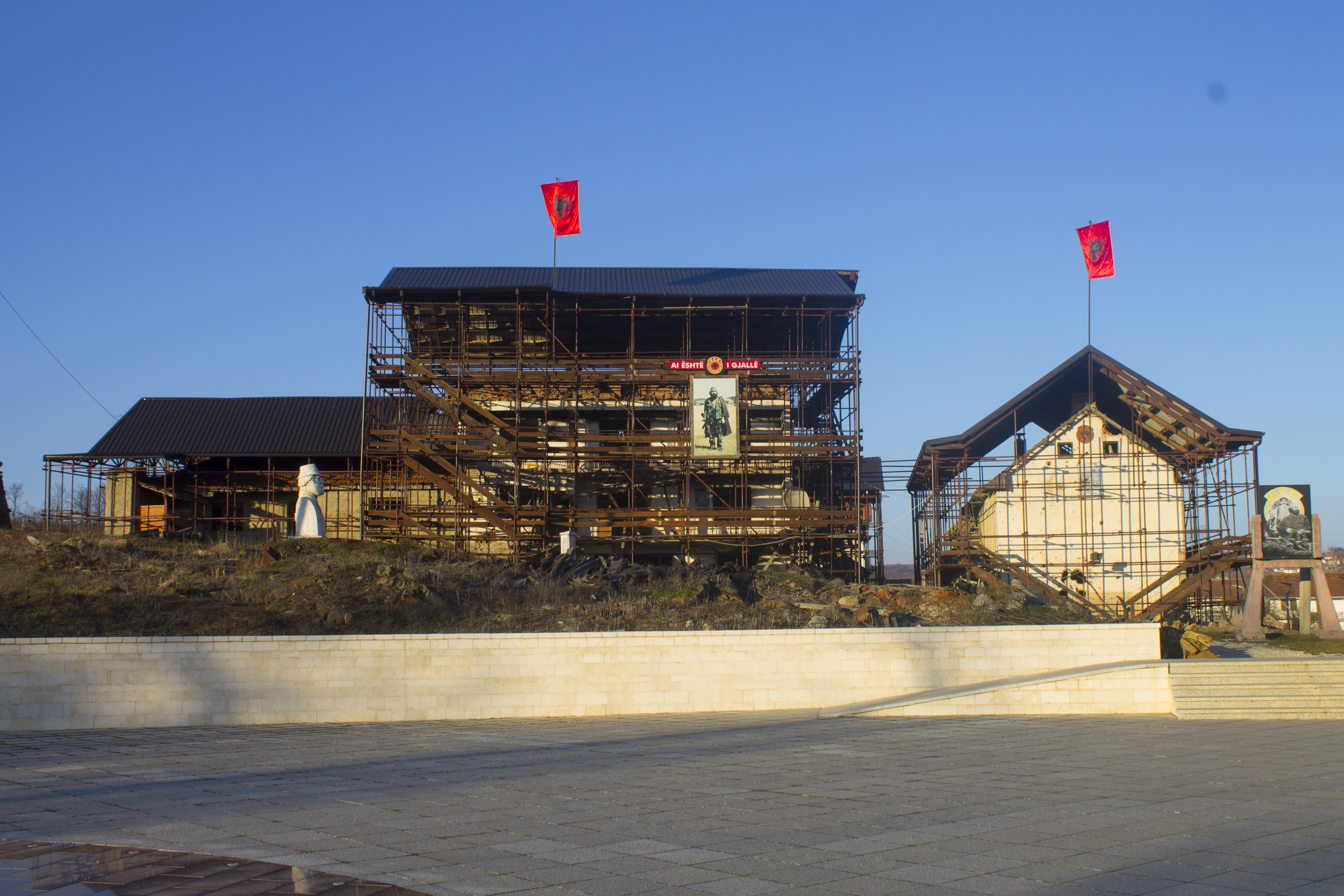
Adem Jashari memorial in Prekaz

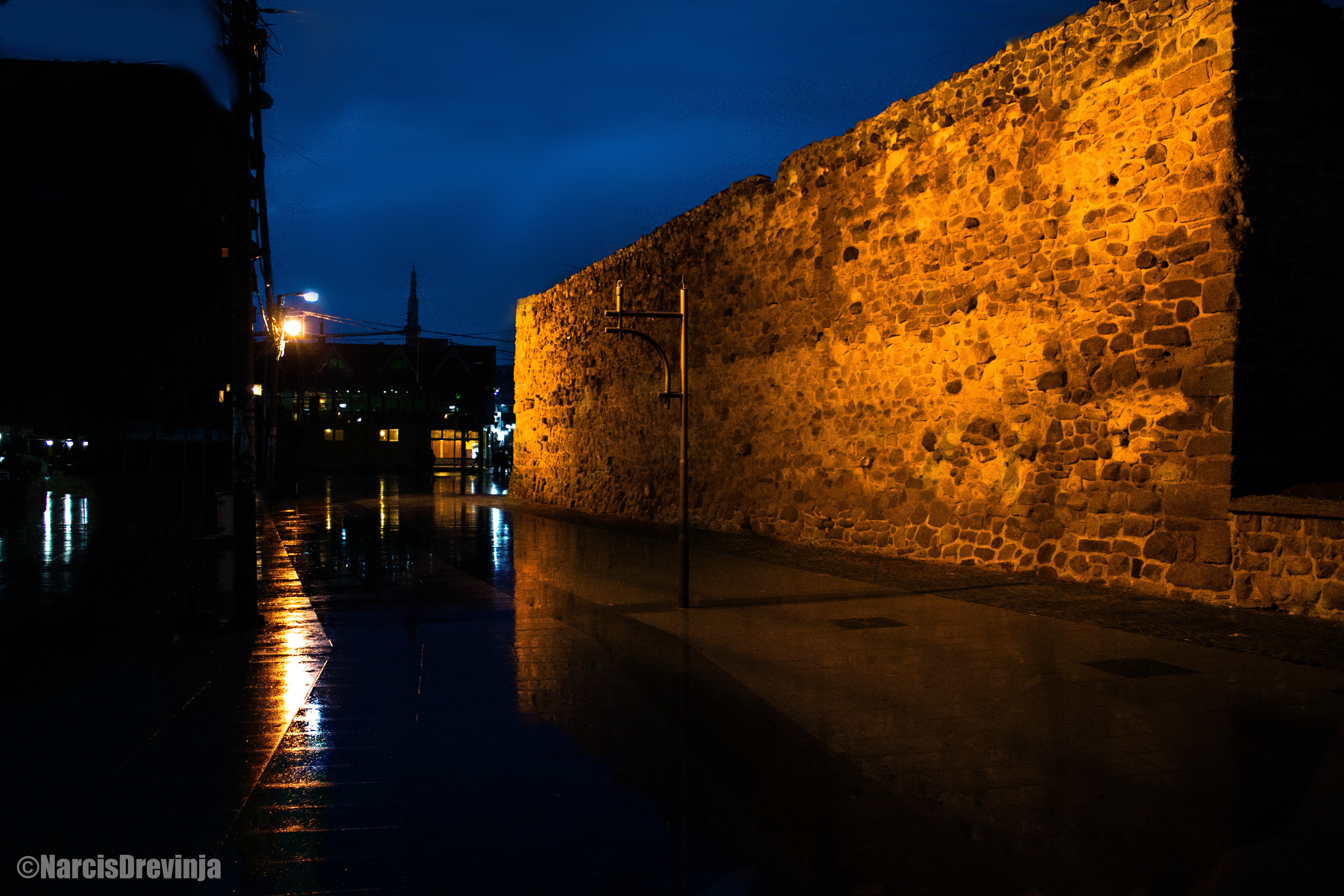
The fortress of Vushtrri

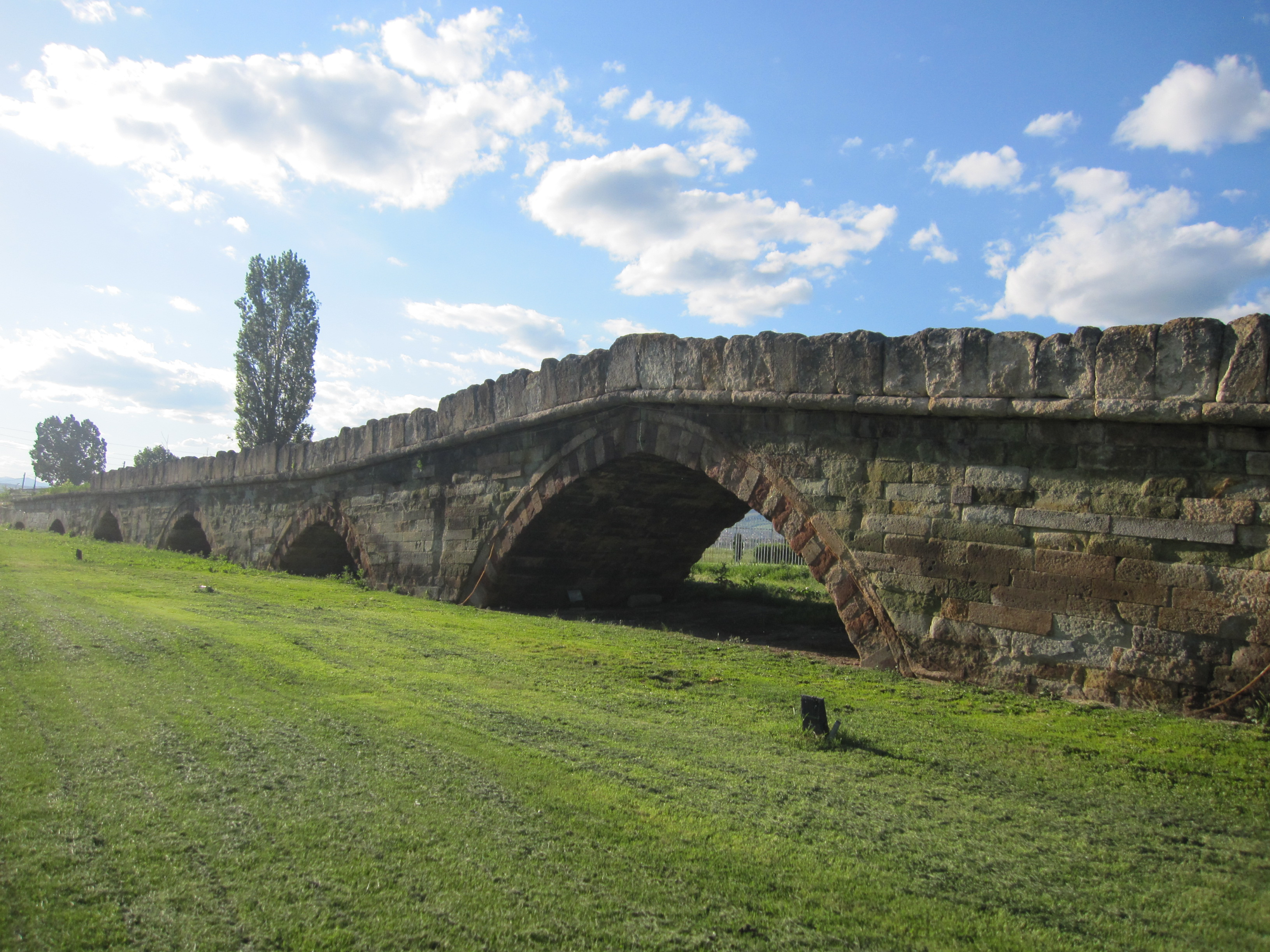
Old Stone Bridge in Vushtrri

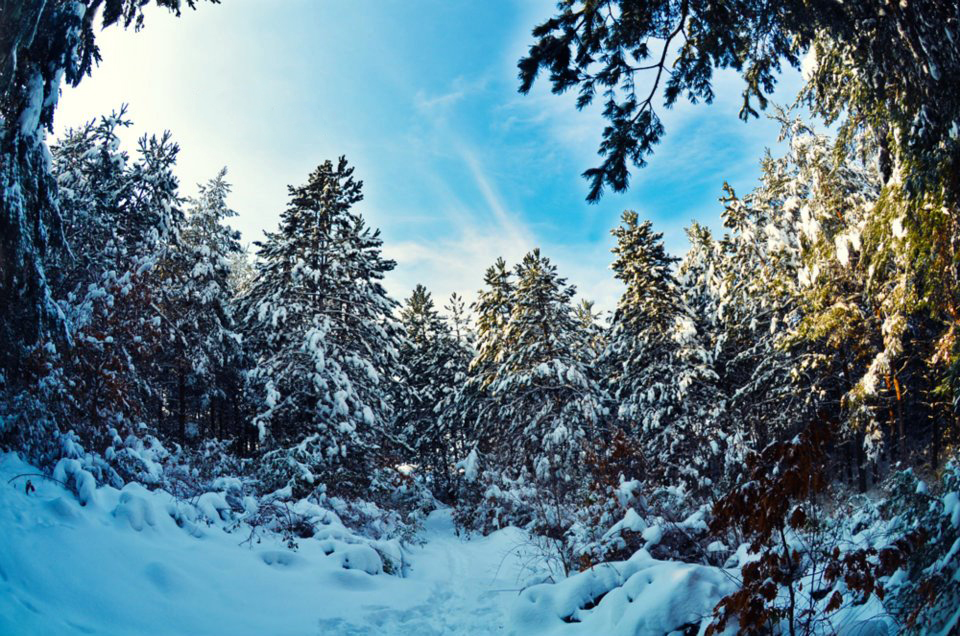
Forests near Vushtrri

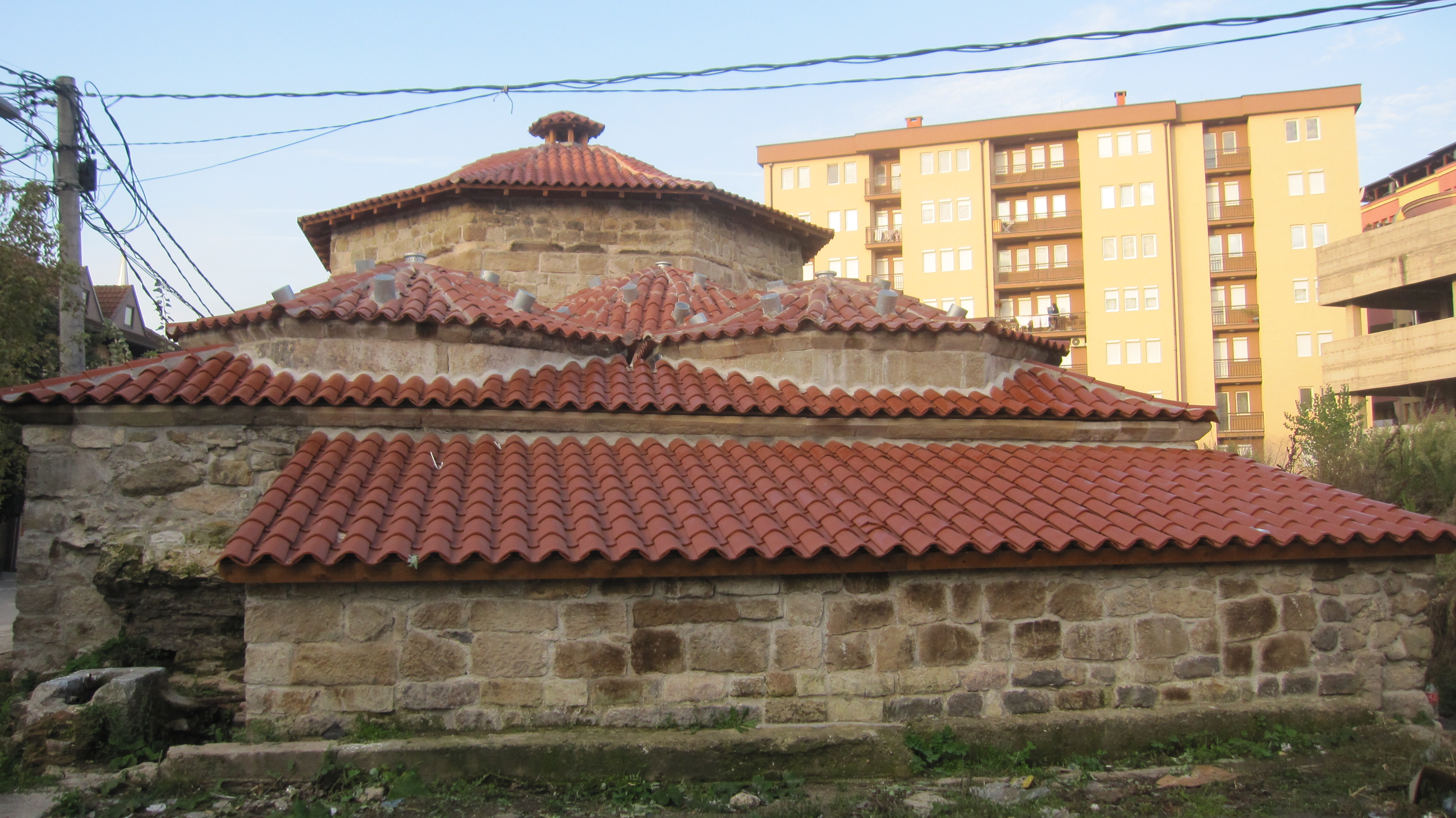
Old Hamam in Vushtrri

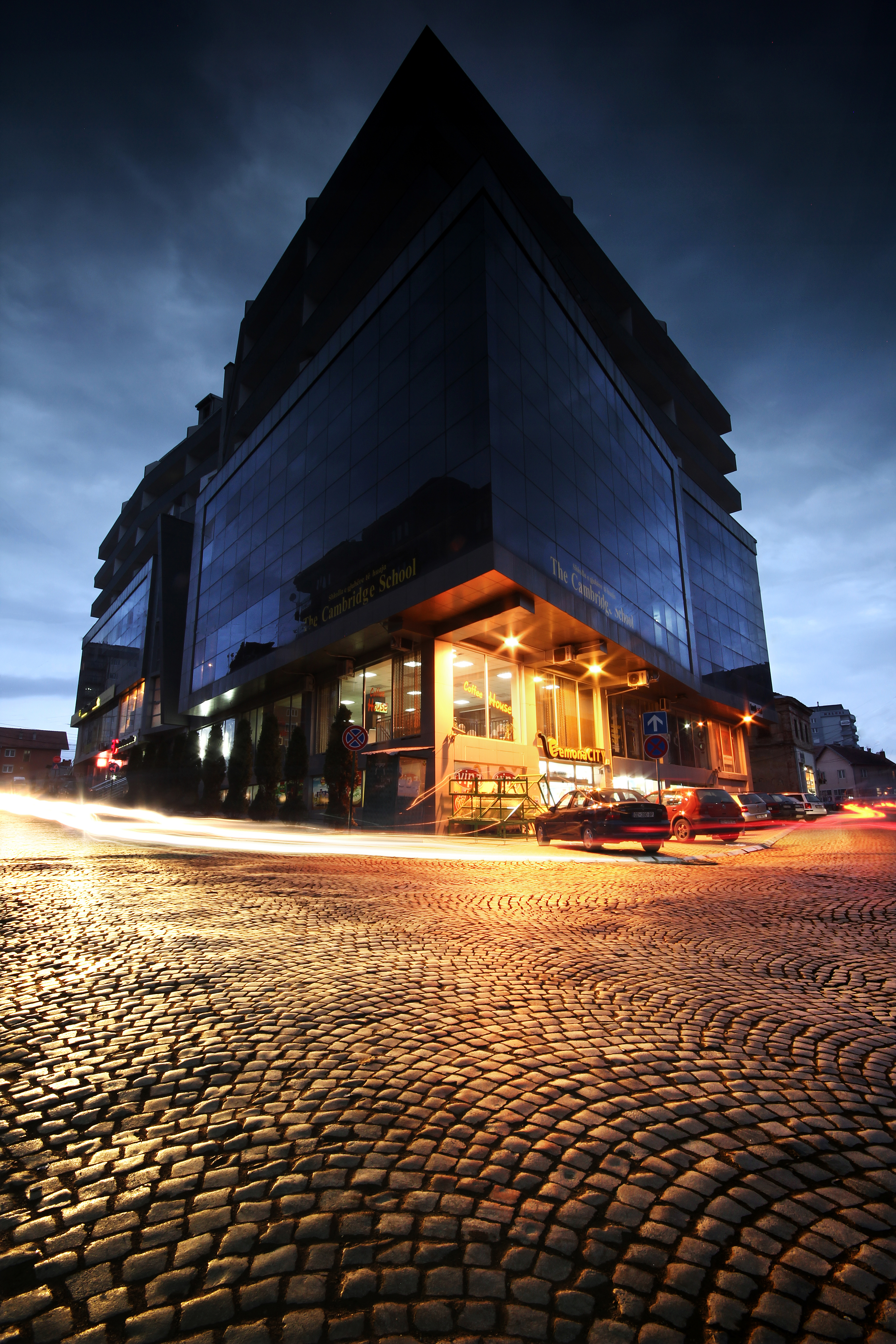
City of Vushtrri

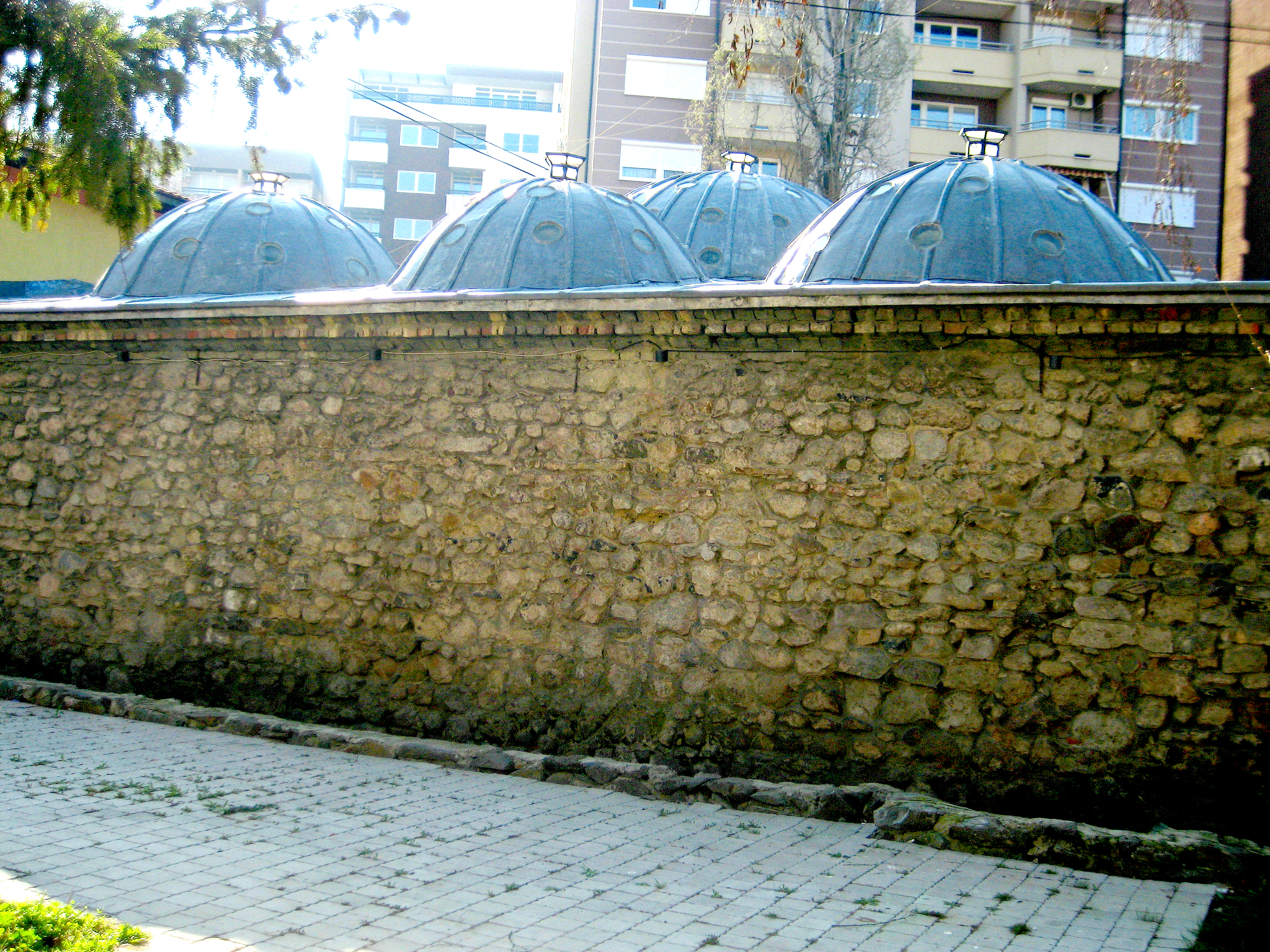
The Building of the Old Hamam in Mitrovica

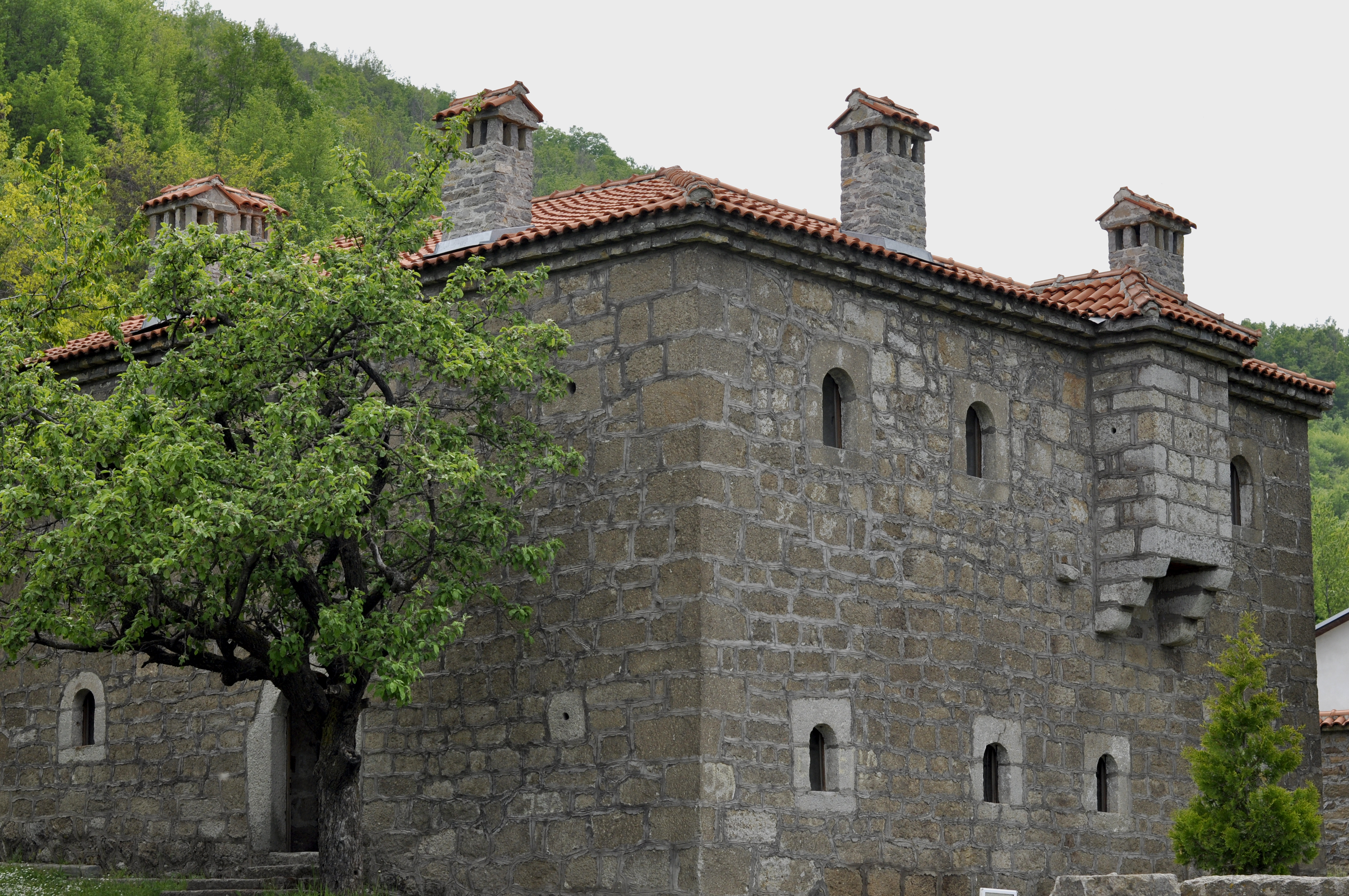
Isa Boletini's tower in Boletin, Zvečan

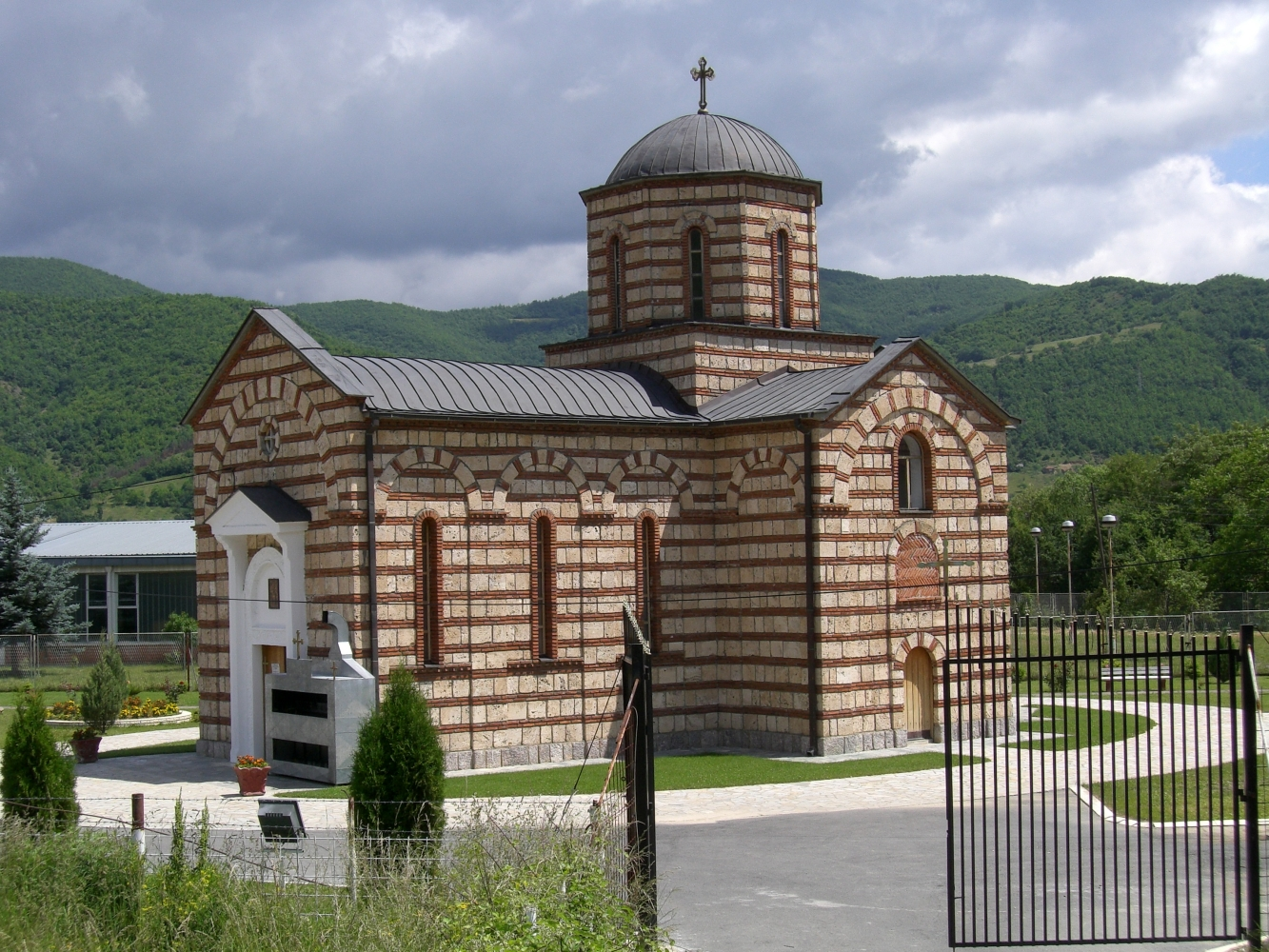
Holy Trinity Church, Zubin Potok

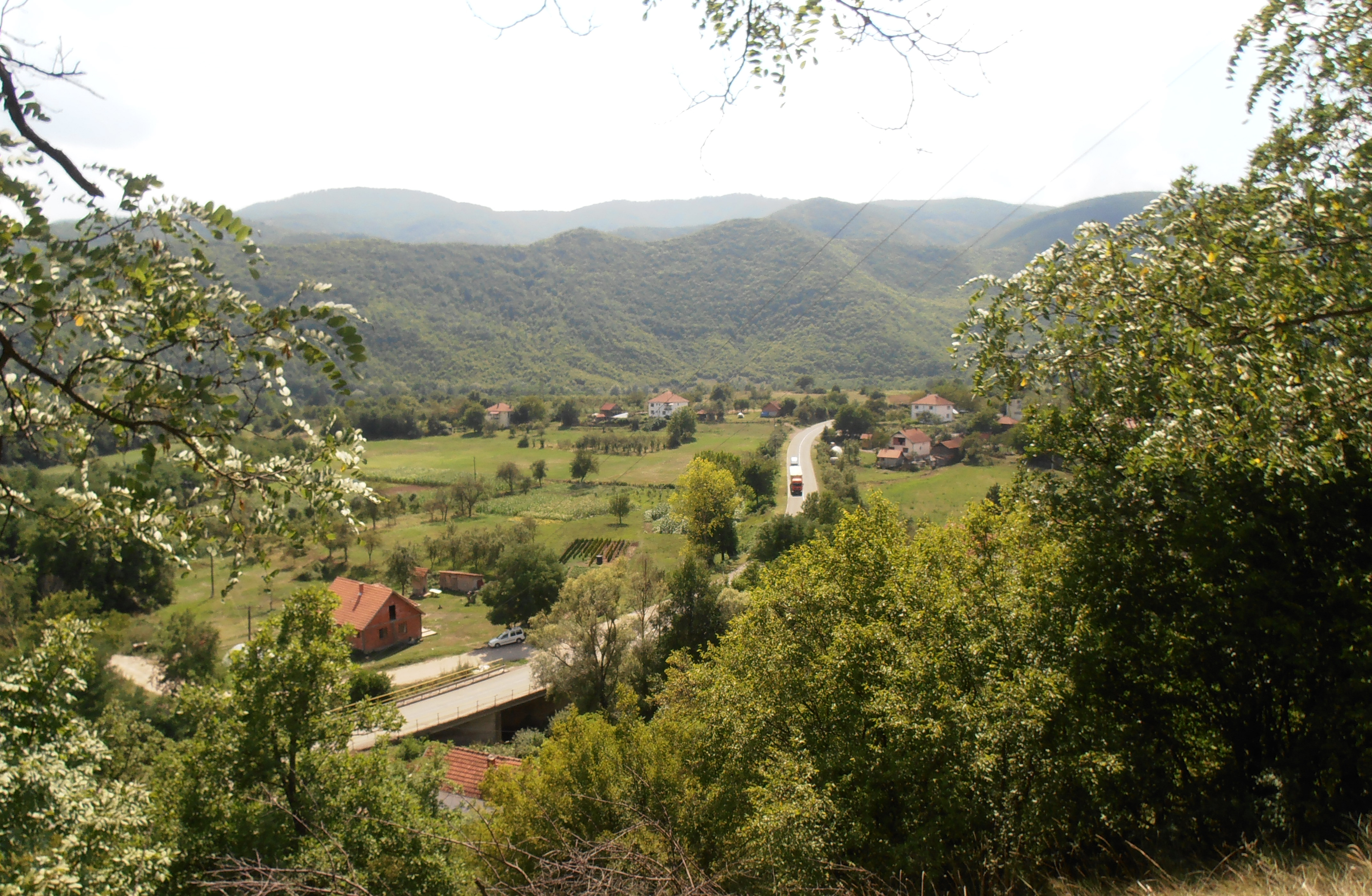
Leposavić

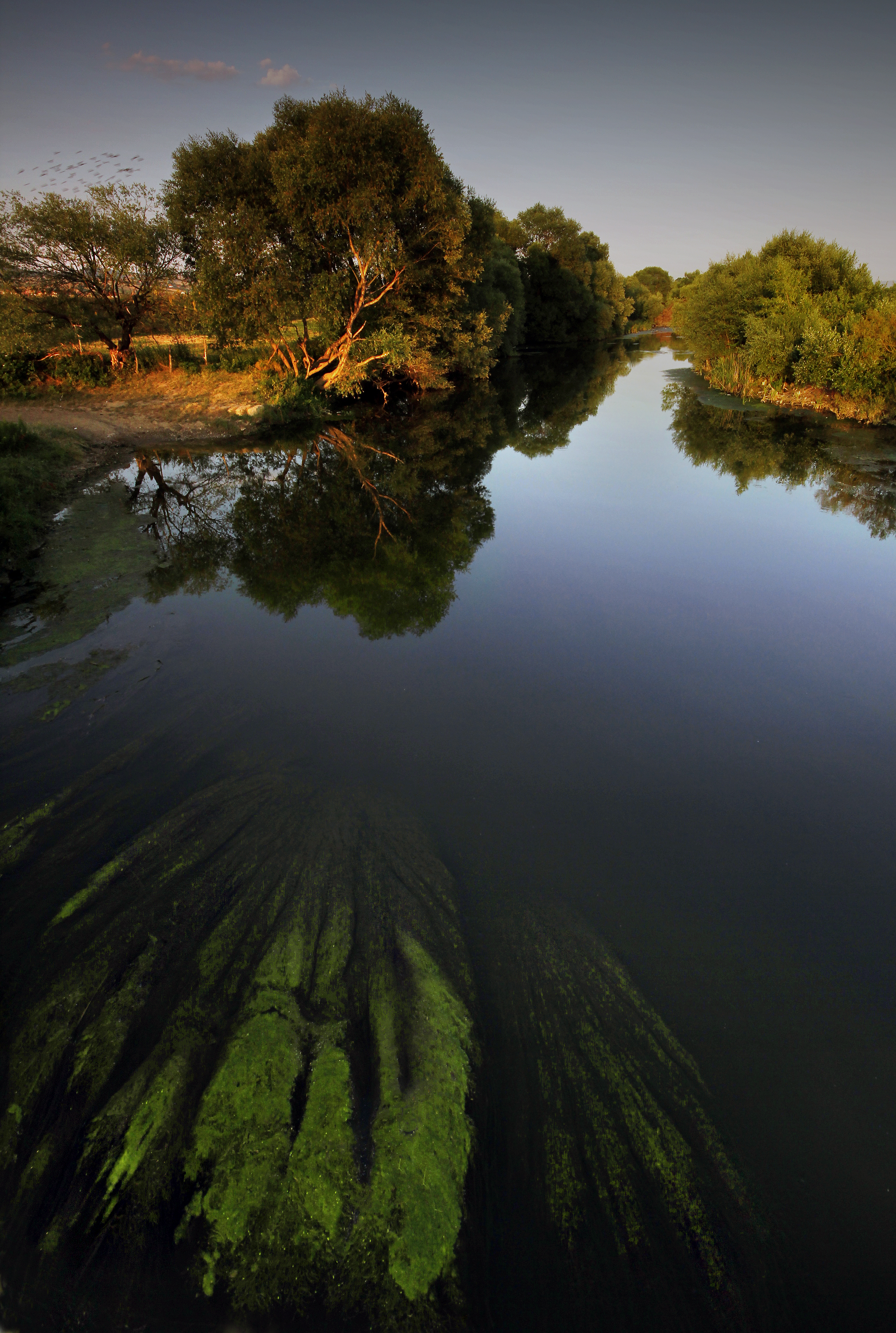
Sitnica river from the bridge

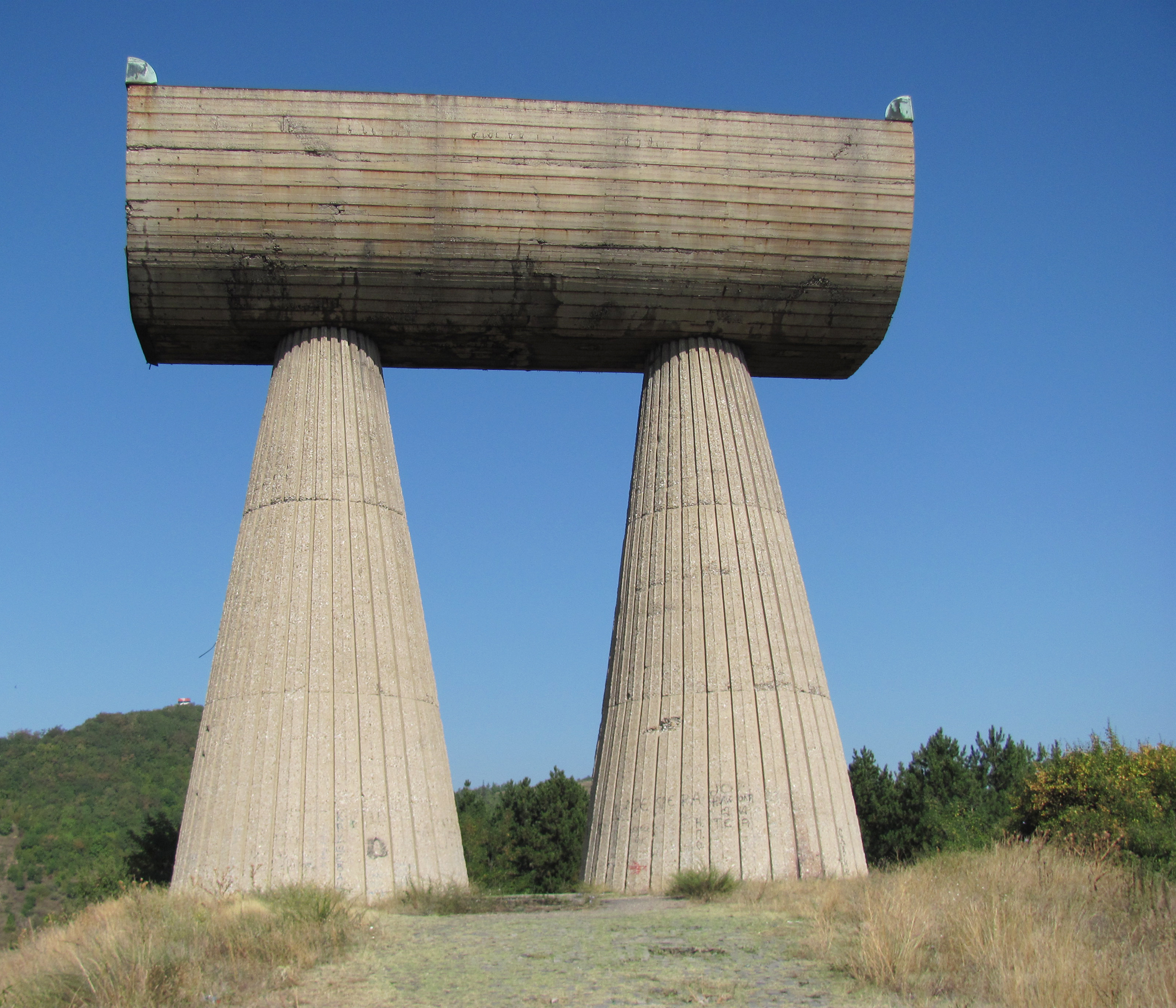
The miners monument in Northern Mitrovica

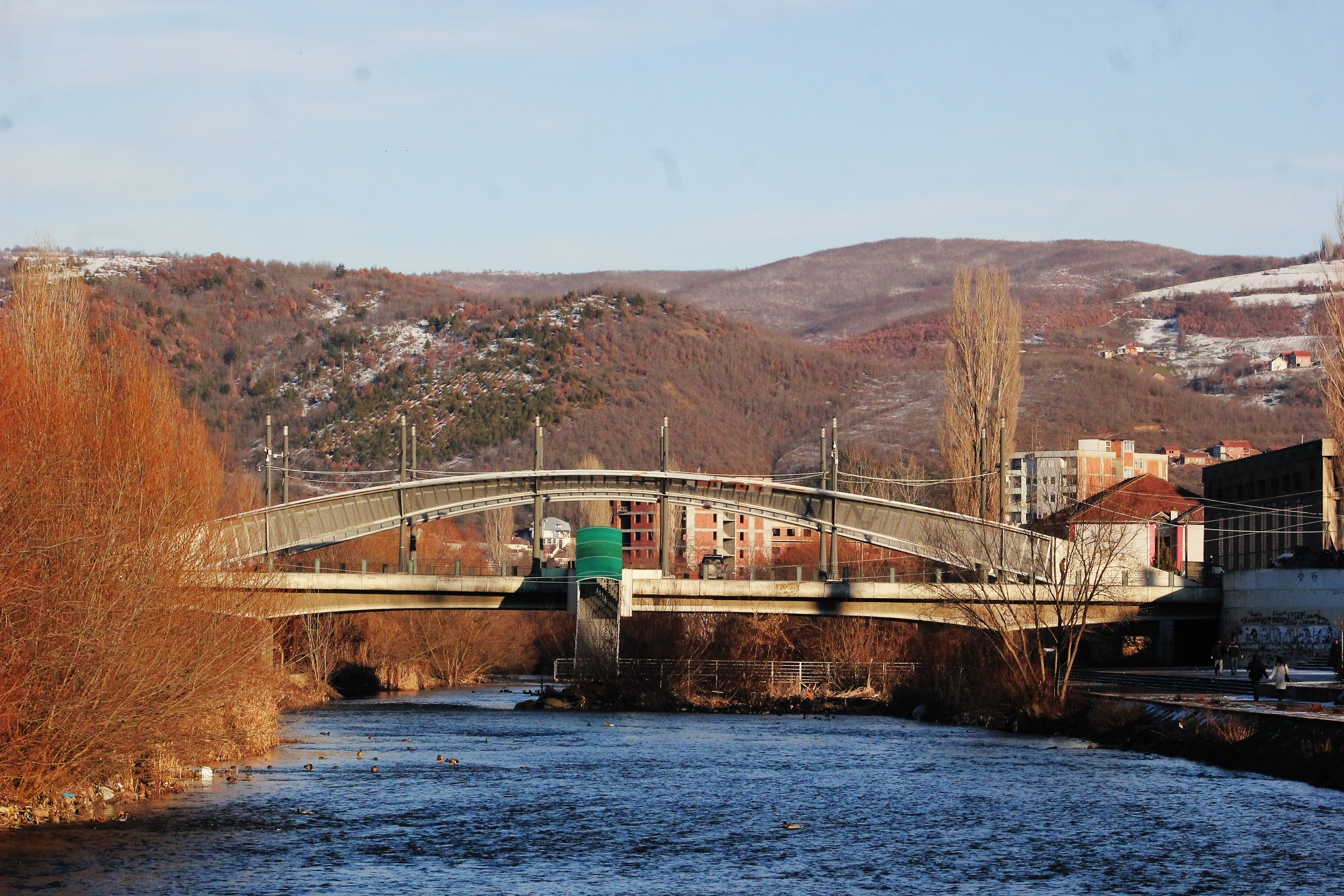
The main bridge above Ibar River in Mitrovica

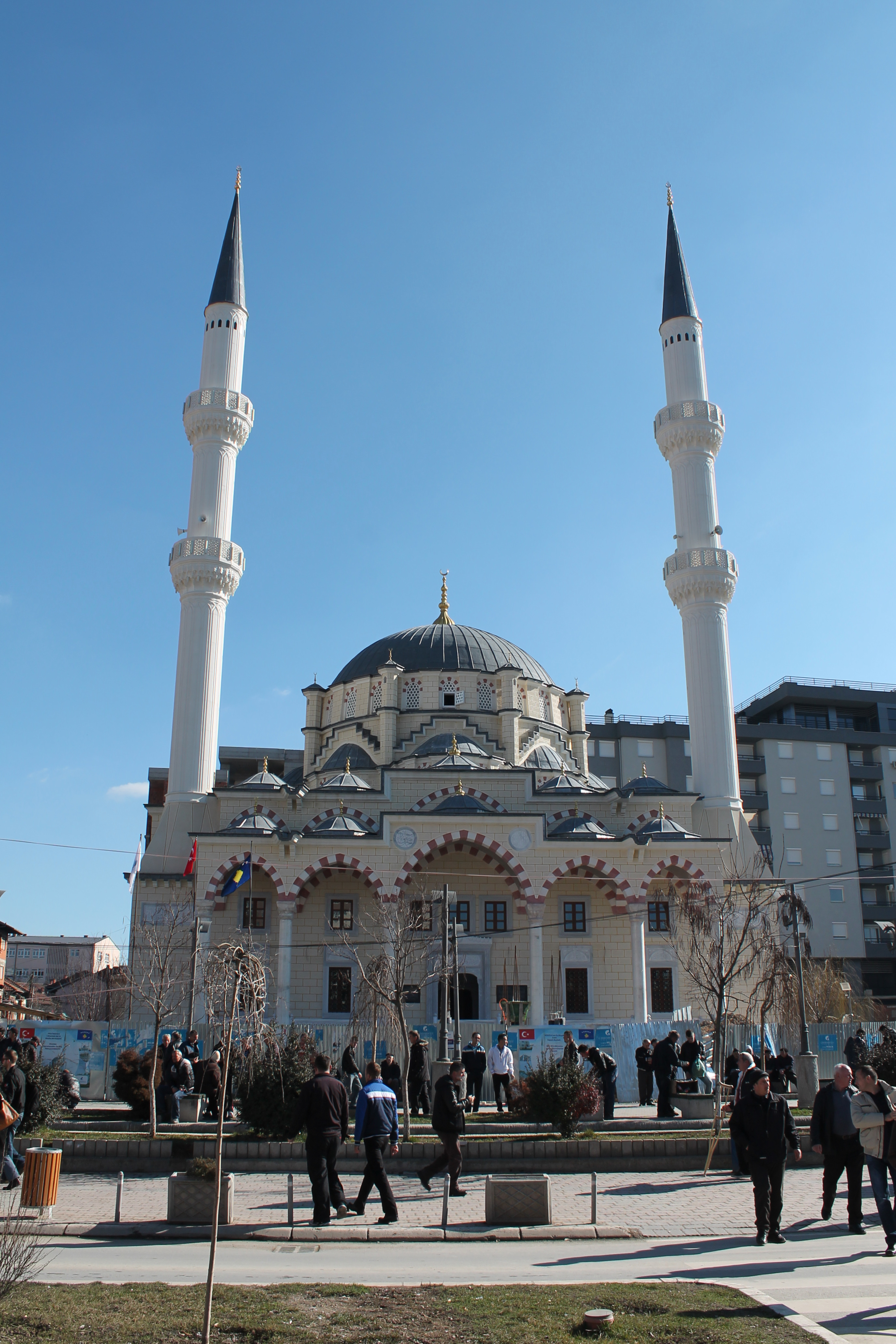
Bayram Paşa Mosque in the center of Mitrovica

== See also ==
- Subdivisions of Kosovo
