= Artakolli i Çyçavicës =

Geographic region in Kosovo

Artakolli i Çyçavicës also known as Artakolli i Vushtrrisë (Serbian: Vučitrnski rukavac) or Rrezja e Çyçavicës is a historical and geographical region located in Kosovo. The southern border of Artakoll is the Guri i Plakës, while the northern border is Vaganicë. The western border is the Çyçavica mountain which divides Artakoll from Drenica, while the eastern border is the river Sitnica. There are more than 30 settlements in the region of Artakoll.

== List of settlements ==
1. Akrashticë
2. Balinc
3. Beçuk
4. Bivolak
5. Bruznik
6. Bukosh
7. Druar
8. Dalaku
9. Frashër
10. Gllavatin
11. Graboci i Epërm
12. Hade
13. Hamidi
14. Hercegova/Gurbardh
15. Kollë
16. Leshkoshiq/Lajthizë
17. Liqej
18. Mihaliq/Mirash
19. Novolan
20. Oshlan
21. Pantinë
22. Pirç
23. Reznik
24. Siboc
25. Stroc
26. Shalë
27. Shipitulla
28. Shtitaricë
29. Taraxha
30. Vërbnica/Vernica e Avdi Agës
31. Vërnicë
32. Zhilivodë/Trimor

== Notable people ==
- Bekim Shyti, UÇK commander
- Aziz Zhilivoda, Ballist
- Adnan Shyti, UÇK soldier
- Qazim Morina, Ballist
- Enver Zymberi, Police officer
- Hamit Saraçi, Kachak
- Ferat Hashim Hasani, Ballist
- Rrahman Rama, Commander of Kosovo Security Force

== See also ==
- Çyçavica
- Vushtrri
