= Shale (disambiguation) =

Shale is a sedimentary rock.

Shale may also refer to:

== Places ==
- Shalë (river), a river in northern Albania
- Shalë, Albania, a municipal unit in Shkodër County, northern Albania
- Shalë, the Albanian name for the Sedlare, settlement in the municipality of Vučitrn, Kosovska Mitrovica, Kosovo
- Shalës, s municipality in Elbasan District, central Albania

== Other uses ==
- Shale (horse), Irish Thoroughbred racehorse
- Shale (surname)
- Shales (surname)
- Shale Framework (software), computer software
- Shale oil
- Oil shale

== See also ==
- Shali, Republic of Tatarstan, Russia
- Schale, a surname
- Shail (disambiguation)
