= Shale (surname) =

Shale is a surname. Notable people by that name include:

- Christopher Shale (1954–2011), British businessman and Conservative Party politician
- David Shale (1932–2016), New Zealander-American mathematician
- Dennis Shale (1948–2017), emeritus professor of respiratory medicine
- Kerry Shale (born 1958), Canadian actor
- Tom Shale (1864–1953), English comic actor

== See also ==
- Shale (disambiguation)
- Shales (surname)
