= Oscillator representation =

Representation theory of the symplectic group

In mathematics, the oscillator representation is a projective unitary representation of the symplectic group, first investigated by Irving Segal, David Shale, and André Weil. A natural extension of the representation leads to a semigroup of contraction operators, introduced as the oscillator semigroup by Roger Howe in 1988. The semigroup had previously been studied by other mathematicians and physicists, most notably Felix Berezin in the 1960s. The simplest example in one dimension is given by SU(1,1). It acts as Möbius transformations on the extended complex plane, leaving the unit circle invariant. In that case the oscillator representation is a unitary representation of a double cover of SU(1,1) and the oscillator semigroup corresponds to a representation by contraction operators of the semigroup in SL(2,C) corresponding to Möbius transformations that take the unit disk into itself.

The contraction operators, determined only up to a sign, have kernels that are Gaussian functions. On an infinitesimal level the semigroup is described by a cone in the Lie algebra of SU(1,1) that can be identified with a light cone. The same framework generalizes to the symplectic group in higher dimensions, including its analogue in infinite dimensions. This article explains the theory for SU(1,1) in detail and summarizes how the theory can be extended.

== Historical overview ==
The mathematical formulation of quantum mechanics by Werner Heisenberg and Erwin Schrödinger was originally in terms of unbounded self-adjoint operators on a Hilbert space. The fundamental operators corresponding to position and momentum satisfy the Heisenberg commutation relations. Quadratic polynomials in these operators, which include the harmonic oscillator, are also closed under taking commutators.

A large amount of operator theory was developed in the 1920s and 1930s to provide a rigorous foundation for quantum mechanics. Part of the theory was formulated in terms of unitary groups of operators, largely through the contributions of Hermann Weyl, Marshall Stone and John von Neumann. In turn these results in mathematical physics were subsumed within mathematical analysis, starting with the 1933 lecture notes of Norbert Wiener, who used the heat kernel for the harmonic oscillator to derive the properties of the Fourier transform.

The uniqueness of the Heisenberg commutation relations, as formulated in the Stone–von Neumann theorem, was later interpreted within group representation theory, in particular the theory of induced representations initiated by George Mackey. The quadratic operators were understood in terms of a projective unitary representation of the group SU(1,1) and its Lie algebra. Irving Segal and David Shale generalized this construction to the symplectic group in finite and infinite dimensions—in physics, this is often referred to as bosonic quantization: it is constructed as the symmetric algebra of an infinite-dimensional space. Segal and Shale have also treated the case of fermionic quantization, which is constructed as the exterior algebra of an infinite-dimensional Hilbert space. In the special case of conformal field theory in 1+1 dimensions, the two versions become equivalent via the so-called "boson-fermion correspondence." Not only does this apply in analysis where there are unitary operators between bosonic and fermionic Hilbert spaces, but also in the mathematical theory of vertex operator algebras. Vertex operators themselves originally arose in the late 1960s in theoretical physics, particularly in string theory.

André Weil later extended the construction to p-adic Lie groups, showing how the ideas could be applied in number theory, in particular to give a group theoretic explanation of theta functions and quadratic reciprocity. Several physicists and mathematicians observed the heat kernel operators corresponding to the harmonic oscillator were associated to a complexification of SU(1,1): this was not the whole of SL(2,C), but instead a complex semigroup defined by a natural geometric condition. The representation theory of this semigroup, and its generalizations in finite and infinite dimensions, has applications both in mathematics and theoretical physics.

== Semigroups in SL(2,C) ==
The group

$$G = \operatorname{SU}(1,1) = \left \{ \left. \begin{pmatrix}\alpha & \beta  \\ \overline{\beta} & \overline{\alpha} \end{pmatrix} \right | |\alpha|^2 -|\beta|^2=1 \right \}$$

is a subgroup of

$$G_c = \operatorname{SL}(2,\mathbb C)$$,

the group of complex 2 × 2 matrices with determinant 1. The real subgroup of $G_c$

$$G_1 = \operatorname{SL(2,\mathbb R)}$$

is conjugate to $G$

$$G=CG_1C^{-1}, \quad C=\begin{pmatrix}1 & i \\ i & 1\end{pmatrix},$$

as matrix multiplication shows.

$G_1$ is generated by

$$J=\begin{pmatrix} 0 & 1 \\ -1 & 0\end{pmatrix}$$

and the subgroup $P$ of lower triangular matrices

$$P = \left \{ \left. \begin{pmatrix} a & 0 \\ b & a^{-1}\end{pmatrix} \right | a,b \in \mathbf{R}, a >0\right\}.$$

The orbit of the vector

$$v=\begin{pmatrix} 0 \\ 1\end{pmatrix}$$

under the subgroup generated by these matrices is easily seen to be $\mathbb R^2 - 0$ and the stabilizer of v in G_{1} lies in inside this subgroup.

The Lie algebra $\mathfrak{g}$ of SU(1,1) consists of matrices

$$\begin{pmatrix} ix & w \\ \overline{w} & -ix \end{pmatrix}, \quad x \in \mathbf{R}.$$

The period 2 automorphism σ of G_{c}

$$\sigma(g)= M \overline{g} M^{-1},$$

with

$$M = \begin{pmatrix} 0 & 1 \\ 1 & 0 \end{pmatrix},$$

has fixed point subgroup G since

$$\sigma\begin{pmatrix} a & b \\ c & d\end{pmatrix} = \begin{pmatrix} \overline{d} & \overline{c} \\ \overline{b} & \overline{a}\end{pmatrix}.$$

Similarly the same formula defines a period two automorphism σ of the Lie algebra $\mathfrak{g}_c$ of G_{c}, the complex matrices with trace zero. A standard basis of $\mathfrak{g}_c$ over C is given by

$$L_0 =\begin{pmatrix} {1\over 2} & 0 \\ 0 & -{1\over 2}\end{pmatrix},\quad L_{-1}=\begin{pmatrix}0 & 1 \\ 0 & 0 \end{pmatrix},\quad L_{1}=\begin{pmatrix} 0 & 0 \\ -1 & 0\end{pmatrix}.$$

They satisfy the Witt algebra

$$[L_m,L_n]=(m-n) L_{m+n},\quad m,n \in \{1,0,-1\}.$$

The Lie algebra of $G_c$ is a direct sum

$$\mathfrak{g}_c =\mathfrak{g} \oplus i\mathfrak{g},$$

where $\mathfrak{g}$ is the +1 eigenspace of σ. The –1 eigenspace $i\mathfrak{g}$ is the Lie algebra of $\operatorname{SU}(2)$, a maximal compact subgroup of $G_c$.

The matrices X in $i\mathfrak{g}$ have the form

$$X=\begin{pmatrix} x & w \\ -\overline{w} & -x \end{pmatrix}.$$

Note that

$$-\det X = x^2 -|w|^2.$$

The cone C in $i\mathfrak{g}$ is defined by two conditions. The first is $\det X < 0.$ By definition this condition is preserved under conjugation by G. Since G is connected it leaves the two components with x > 0 and x < 0 invariant. The second condition is $x<0.$

The group G^{c} acts by Möbius transformations on the extended complex plane. The subgroup G acts as automorphisms of the unit disk D. A semigroup H of G^{c}, first considered by Olshanskii (1981), can be defined by the geometric condition:

$$g(\overline{D}) \subset D.$$

The semigroup can be described explicitly in terms of the cone C:

$$H =G\cdot \exp(C) =\exp(C)\cdot G.$$

In fact the matrix X can be conjugated by an element of G to the matrix

$$Y=\begin{pmatrix} -y & 0 \\ 0 & y \end{pmatrix}$$

with

$$y=\sqrt{x^2 - |w|^2} > 0.$$

Since the Möbius transformation corresponding to exp Y sends z to e^{−2y}z, it follows that the right hand side lies in the semigroup. Conversely if g lies in H it carries the closed unit disk onto a smaller closed disk in its interior. Conjugating by an element of G, the smaller disk can be taken to have centre 0. But then for appropriate y, the element $e^{-Y}g$ carries D onto itself so lies in G.

A similar argument shows that the closure of H, also a semigroup, is given by

$$\overline{H}= \{ g\in \operatorname{SL}(2,\mathbf{C})| gD\subseteq D \}=G\cdot \exp{\overline{C}} = \exp{\overline{C}}\cdot G.$$

From the above statement on conjugacy, it follows that

$$H=G A_+ G,$$

where

$$A_+ = \left \{ \left. \begin{pmatrix} e^{-y} & 0 \\ 0 & e^y \end{pmatrix} \right | y > 0 \right \}.$$

If

$$\begin{pmatrix}a & b \\ c & d\end{pmatrix} \in H$$

then

$$\begin{pmatrix}\overline{a} & \overline{b} \\ \overline{c} & \overline{d}\end{pmatrix},\quad \begin{pmatrix}a & -c \\ -b & d\end{pmatrix} \in H,$$

since the latter is obtained by taking the transpose and conjugating by the diagonal matrix with entries ±1. Hence H also contains

$$\begin{pmatrix}\overline{a} & -\overline{c} \\ -\overline{b} & \overline{d}\end{pmatrix}.$$

which gives the inverse matrix if the original matrix lies in SU(1,1).

A further result on conjugacy follows by noting that every element of H must fix a point in D, which by conjugation with an element of G can be taken to be 0. Then the element of H has the form

$$M= \begin{pmatrix} a& 0 \\ b & a^{-1} \end{pmatrix}, \qquad |a| < 1 \quad \text{and} \quad |b| < |a|^{-1} - |a|.$$

The set of such lower triangular matrices forms a subsemigroup H_{0} of H.

Since

$$M\begin{pmatrix} x & 0 \\ 0 & x^{-1}\end{pmatrix} = \begin{pmatrix} x & 0\\ ba^{-1}(x-x^{-1}) & x^{-1}\end{pmatrix}M,$$

every matrix in H_{0} is conjugate to a diagonal matrix by a matrix M in H_{0}.

Similarly every one-parameter semigroup S(t) in H fixes the same point in D so is conjugate by an element of G to a one-parameter semigroup in H_{0}.

It follows that there is a matrix M in H_{0} such that

$$MS(t)=S_0(t)M,$$

with S_{0}(t) diagonal. Similarly there is a matrix N in H_{0} such that

$$S(t)N=NS_0(t),$$

The semigroup H_{0} generates the subgroup L of complex lower triangular matrices with determinant 1 (given by the above formula with a ≠ 0). Its Lie algebra consists of matrices of the form

$$Z=\begin{pmatrix} z & 0 \\ w & -z\end{pmatrix}.$$

In particular the one parameter semigroup exp tZ lies in H_{0} for all t > 0 if and only if $\Re z < 0$ and $|\Re z| > \tfrac{1}{2} |w|.$

This follows from the criterion for H or directly from the formula

$$\exp Z= \begin{pmatrix} e^z & 0\\ f(z) w & e^{-z} \end{pmatrix}, \qquad f(z)={\sinh z\over z}.$$

The exponential map is known not to be surjective in this case, even though it is surjective on the whole group L. This follows because the squaring operation is not surjective in H. Indeed, since the square of an element fixes 0 only if the original element fixes 0, it suffices to prove this in H_{0}. Take α with |α| < 1 and

$$\left |\alpha +\alpha^{-1} \right |<|\alpha| +|\alpha^{-1}|.$$

If a = α^{2} and

$$b = (1-\delta) (|a|^{-1}-|a|),$$

with

$$(1-\delta)^2={|\alpha +\alpha^{-1}|\over |\alpha| +|\alpha^{-1}|},$$

then the matrix

$$\begin{pmatrix} a & 0 \\ b & a^{-1}\end{pmatrix}$$

has no square root in H_{0}. For a square root would have the form

$$\begin{pmatrix} \alpha & 0 \\ \beta & \alpha^{-1}\end{pmatrix}.$$

On the other hand,

$$|\beta|={b\over |\alpha+\alpha^{-1}|}={|\alpha|^{-1} -|\alpha|\over 1-\delta} > |\alpha|^{-1} -|\alpha|.$$

The closed semigroup $\overline{H}$ is maximal in SL(2,C): any larger semigroup must be the whole of SL(2,C).

Using computations motivated by theoretical physics, Ferrara et al. (1973) introduced the semigroup $H$, defined through a set of inequalities. Without identification $H$ as a compression semigroup, they established the maximality of $\overline{H}$. Using the definition as a compression semigroup, maximality reduces to checking what happens when adding a new fractional transformation $g$ to $\overline{H}$. The idea of the proof depends on considering the positions of the two discs $g(D)$ and $D$. In the key cases, either one disc contains the other or they are disjoint. In the simplest cases, $g$ is the inverse of a scaling transformation or $g(z)=-1/z$. In either case $g$ and $H$ generate an open neighbourhood of 1 and hence the whole of SL(2,C)

Later Lawson (1998) gave another more direct way to prove maximality by first showing that there is a g in S sending D onto the disk D^{c}, |z| > 1. In fact if $x\in S\setminus\overline{H},$ then there is a small disk D_{1} in D such that xD_{1} lies in D^{c}. Then for some h in H, D_{1} = hD. Similarly yxD_{1} = D^{c} for some y in H. So g = yxh lies in S and sends D onto D^{c}. It follows that g^{2} fixes the unit disc D so lies in SU(1,1). So g^{−1} lies in S. If t lies in H then tgD contains gD. Hence $g^{-1}t^{-1}g \in \overline{H}.$ So t^{−1} lies in S and therefore S contains an open neighbourhood of 1. Hence S = SL(2,C).

Exactly the same argument works for Möbius transformations on R^{n} and the open semigroup taking the closed unit sphere ||x|| ≤ 1 into the open unit sphere ||x|| < 1. The closure is a maximal proper semigroup in the group of all Möbius transformations. When n = 1, the closure corresponds to Möbius transformations of the real line taking the closed interval [–1,1] into itself.

The semigroup H and its closure have a further piece of structure inherited from G, namely inversion on G extends to an antiautomorphism of H and its closure, which fixes the elements in exp C and its closure. For

$$g=\begin{pmatrix} a & b \\ c & d\end{pmatrix},$$

the antiautomorphism is given by

$$g^+=\begin{pmatrix} \overline{a} & -\overline{c} \\ -\overline{b} & \overline{d}\end{pmatrix}$$

and extends to an antiautomorphism of SL(2,C).

Similarly the antiautomorphism

$$g^\dagger=\begin{pmatrix} \overline{d} & -\overline{b} \\ -\overline{c} & \overline{a}\end{pmatrix}$$

leaves G_{1} invariant and fixes the elements in exp C_{1} and its closure, so it has analogous properties for the semigroup in G_{1}.

== Commutation relations of Heisenberg and Weyl ==
Let $\mathcal S$ be the space of Schwartz functions on R. It is dense in the Hilbert space L^{2}(R) of square-integrable functions on R. Following the terminology of quantum mechanics, the "momentum" operator P and "position" operator Q are defined on $\mathcal S$ by

$$Pf(x)=if'(x),\qquad Qf(x)=xf(x).$$

There operators satisfy the Heisenberg commutation relation

$$PQ-QP=iI.$$

Both P and Q are self-adjoint for the inner product on $\mathcal S$ inherited from L^{2}(R).

Two one parameter unitary groups U(s) and V(t) can be defined on $\mathcal S$ and L^{2}(R) by

$$U(s)f(x)= f(x-s),\qquad V(t)f(x)=e^{ixt} f(x).$$

By definition

$${d\over ds} U(s)f= iP U(s)f,\qquad {d\over dt} V(t)f=iQV(t)f$$

for $f\in\mathcal S$, so that formally

$$U(s)=e^{iPs},\qquad V(t)=e^{iQt}.$$

It is immediate from the definition that the one parameter groups U and V satisfy the Weyl commutation relation

$$U(s)V(t)=e^{-ist}V(t)U(s).$$

The realization of U and V on L^{2}(R) is called the Schrödinger representation.

== Fourier transform ==
The Fourier transform is defined on $\mathcal S$ by

$$\widehat{f}(\xi)= {1\over \sqrt{2\pi}} \int_{-\infty}^\infty f(x) e^{-ix\xi} \, dx.$$

It defines a continuous map of $\mathcal S$ into itself for its natural topology.

Contour integration shows that the function

$$H_0(x) ={e^{-x^2/2}\over \sqrt{2\pi}}$$

is its own Fourier transform.

On the other hand, integrating by parts or differentiating under the integral,

$$\widehat{Pf}=-Q\widehat{f},\qquad \widehat{Qf} =P\widehat{f}.$$

It follows that the operator on $\mathcal S$ defined by

$$Tf(x)=\widehat{\widehat f}(-x)$$

commutes with both Q (and P). On the other hand,

$$TH_0=H_0$$

and since

$$g(x)={f(x)-f(a)H_0(x)/H_0(a)\over x-a}$$

lies in $\mathcal S$, it follows that

$$T(x-a)g|_{x=a}=(x-a)Tg|_{x=a}=0$$

and hence

$$Tf(a)= f(a).$$

This implies the Fourier inversion formula:

$$f(x) ={1\over \sqrt{2\pi}}\int_{-\infty}^\infty \widehat{f}(\xi)e^{ix\xi}\, d\xi$$

and shows that the Fourier transform is an isomorphism of $\mathcal S$ onto itself.

By Fubini's theorem

$$\int_{-\infty}^\infty f(x)\widehat{g}(x)\, dx= {1\over \sqrt{2\pi}}\iint f(x)g(\xi)e^{-ix\xi} \,dxd\xi=\int_{-\infty}^\infty \widehat{f}(\xi) g(\xi)\, d\xi.$$

When combined with the inversion formula this implies that the Fourier transform preserves the inner product

$$\left (\widehat{f},\widehat{g} \right ) = (f,g)$$

so defines an isometry of $\mathcal S$ onto itself.

By density it extends to a unitary operator on L^{2}(R), as asserted by Plancherel's theorem.

== Stone–von Neumann theorem ==
Suppose U(s) and V(t) are one parameter unitary groups on a Hilbert space $\mathcal H$ satisfying the Weyl commutation relations

$$U(s)V(t) =e^{-ist} V(t)U(s).$$

For $F(s,t)\in\mathcal{S}(\mathbf{R}\times \mathbf{R}),$ let

$$F^\vee(x,y)={1\over \sqrt{2\pi}} \int_{-\infty}^\infty F(t,y) e^{-itx}\, dt$$

and define a bounded operator on $\mathcal H$ by

$$T(F)=\iint F^\vee(x,x+y)U(x)V(y)\,dxdy.$$

Then

$$\begin{align}
T(F)T(G)&=T(F\star G)\\
T(F)^* &= T(F^*)
\end{align}$$

where

$$\begin{align}
(F\star G)(x,y)&=\int F(x,z)G(z,y) \, dz \\
F^*(x,y)&=\overline{F(y,x)}
\end{align}$$

The operators T(F) have an important non-degeneracy property: the linear span of all vectors T(F)ξ is dense in $\mathcal H$.

Indeed, if fds and gdt define probability measures with compact support, then the smeared operators

$$U(f)=\int U(s) f(s) \, ds,\qquad V(g)=\int V(t) g(t)\, dt$$

satisfy

$$\|U(f)\|, \|V(g)\| \le 1$$

and converge in the strong operator topology to the identity operator if the supports of the measures decrease to 0.

Since U(f)V(g) has the form T(F), non-degeneracy follows.

When $\mathcal H$ is the Schrödinger representation on L^{2}(R), the operator T(F) is given by

$$T(F)f(x)=\int F(x,y)f(y) \, dy.$$

It follows from this formula that U and V jointly act irreducibly on the Schrödinger representation since this is true for the operators given by kernels that are Schwartz functions. A concrete description is provided by Linear canonical transformations.

Conversely given a representation of the Weyl commutation relations on $\mathcal H$, it gives rise to a non-degenerate representation of the *-algebra of kernel operators. But all such representations are on an orthogonal direct sum of copies of L^{2}(R) with the action on each copy as above. This is a straightforward generalisation of the elementary fact that the representations of the N × N matrices are on direct sums of the standard representation on C^{N}. The proof using matrix units works equally well in infinite dimensions.

The one parameter unitary groups U and V leave each component invariant, inducing the standard action on the Schrödinger representation.

In particular this implies the Stone–von Neumann theorem: the Schrödinger representation is the unique irreducible representation of the Weyl commutation relations on a Hilbert space.

== Oscillator representation of SL(2,R) ==
Given U and V satisfying the Weyl commutation relations, define

$$W(x,y)=e^{\frac{ixy}{2}}U(x)V(y).$$

Then

$$W(x_1,y_1)W(x_2,y_2)=e^{i(x_1y_2-y_1x_2)} W(x_1+x_2,y_1+y_2),$$

so that W defines a projective unitary representation of R^{2} with cocycle given by

$$\omega(z_1,z_2) = e^{iB(z_1,z_2)},$$

where $z=x+iy=(x,y)$ and B is the symplectic form on R^{2} given by

$$B(z_1,z_2)=x_1y_2-y_1x_2=\Im z_1\overline {z_2}.$$

By the Stone–von Neumann theorem, there is a unique irreducible representation corresponding to this cocycle.

It follows that if g is an automorphism of R^{2} preserving the form B, i.e. an element of SL(2,R), then there is a unitary π(g) on L^{2}(R) satisfying the covariance relation

$$\pi(g) W(z) \pi(g)^* = W(g(z)).$$

By Schur's lemma the unitary π(g) is unique up to multiplication by a scalar ζ with |ζ| = 1, so that π defines a projective unitary representation of SL(2,R).

This can be established directly using only the irreducibility of the Schrödinger representation. Irreducibility was a direct consequence of the fact the operators

$$\iint K(x,y) U(x)V(y) \, dxdy,$$

with K a Schwartz function correspond exactly to operators given by kernels with Schwartz functions.

These are dense in the space of Hilbert–Schmidt operators, which, since it contains the finite rank operators, acts irreducibly.

The existence of π can be proved using only the irreducibility of the Schrödinger representation. The operators are unique up to a sign with

$$\pi(gh)=\pm \pi(g)\pi(h),$$

so that the 2-cocycle for the projective representation of SL(2,R) takes values ±1.

In fact the group SL(2,R) is generated by matrices of the form

$$g_1=\begin{pmatrix} a & 0 \\ 0 & a^{-1} \end{pmatrix},\,\, g_2=\begin{pmatrix} 1 & 0\\ b & 1\end{pmatrix},\,\, g_3=\begin{pmatrix} 0 & 1\\ -1 & 0\end{pmatrix},$$

and it can be verified directly that the following operators satisfy the covariance relations above:

$$\pi(g_1)f(x)=\pm a^{-\frac{1}{2}} f(a^{-1}x),\,\, \pi(g_2)f(x) =\pm e^{-ibx^2} f(x),\,\, \pi(g_3)f(x)=\pm e^{\frac{i\pi}{8}} \widehat{f}(x).$$

The generators g_{i} satisfy the following Bruhat relations, which uniquely specify the group SL(2,R):

$$g_3^2=g_1(-1) ,\,\, g_3 g_1(a)g_3^{-1}=g_1(a^{-1}),\,\, g_1(a) g_2(b) g_1(a)^{-1}=g_2(a^{-2}b),\,\, g_1(a)=g_3 g_2(a^{-1}) g_3 g_2(a) g_3 g_2(a^{-1}).$$

It can be verified by direct calculation that these relations are satisfied up to a sign by the corresponding operators, which establishes that the cocycle takes values ±1.

There is a more conceptual explanation using an explicit construction of the metaplectic group as a double cover of SL(2,R). SL(2,R) acts by Möbius transformations on the upper half plane H. Moreover, if

$$g=\begin{pmatrix} a & b \\ c & d\end{pmatrix},$$

then

$${dg(z)\over dz} = {1\over (cz+d)^2}.$$

The function

$$m(g,z)=cz+d$$

satisfies the 1-cocycle relation

$$m(gh,z)=m(g,hz)m(h,z).$$

For each g, the function m(g,z) is non-vanishing on H and therefore has two possible holomorphic square roots. The metaplectic group is defined as the group

$$\operatorname{Mp}(2,\mathbf R)=\{(g,G)|G(z)^2=m(g,z)\}.$$

By definition it is a double cover of SL(2,R) and is connected. Multiplication is given by

$$(g,G)\cdot (h,H)=(gh,K),$$

where

$$K(z)=G(hz)H(z).$$

Thus for an element g of the metaplectic group there is a uniquely determined function m(g,z)^{1/2} satisfying the 1-cocycle relation.

If $\Im z > 0$, then

$$f_z(x) = e^{izx^2/2}$$

lies in L^{2} and is called a coherent state.

These functions lie in a single orbit of SL(2,R) generated by

$$f_i(x) = e^{-\frac{x^2}{2}},$$

since for g in SL(2,R)

$$\pi((g^t)^{-1})f_z(x)= \pm m(g,z)^{-1/2}f_{gz}(x).$$

More specifically if g lies in Mp(2,R) then

$$\pi((g^t)^{-1})f_z(x)= m(g,z)^{-1/2}f_{gz}(x).$$

Indeed, if this holds for g and h, it also holds for their product. On the other hand, the formula is easily checked if g^{t} has the form g_{i} and these are generators.

This defines an ordinary unitary representation of the metaplectic group.

The element (1,–1) acts as multiplication by –1 on L^{2}(R), from which it follows that the cocycle on SL(2,R) takes only values ±1.

== Maslov index ==
As explained in Lion & Vergne (1980), the 2-cocycle on SL(2,R) associated with the metaplectic representation, taking values ±1, is determined by the Maslov index.

Given three non-zero vectors u, v, w in the plane, their Maslov index $\tau(u,v,w)$ is defined as the signature of the quadratic form on R^{3} defined by

$$Q(a,b,c)=abB(u,v)+bcB(v,w) + caB(w,u).$$

Properties of the Maslov index:

- it depends on the one-dimensional subspaces spanned by the vectors
- it is invariant under SL(2,R)
- it is alternating in its arguments, i.e. its sign changes if two of the arguments are interchanged
- it vanishes if two of the subspaces coincide
- it takes the values –1, 0 and +1: if u and v satisfy B(u,v) = 1 and w = au + bv, then the Maslov index is zero is if ab = 0 and is otherwise equal to minus the sign of ab
- $\displaystyle{\tau(v,w,z) - \tau(u,w,z) + \tau(u,v,z) - \tau(u,v,w)=0}$

Picking a non-zero vector u_{0}, it follows that the function

$$\Omega(g,h)=\exp -{\pi i\over 4}\tau(u_0,gu_0,ghu_0)$$

defines a 2-cocycle on SL(2,R) with values in the eighth roots of unity.

A modification of the 2-cocycle can be used to define a 2-cocycle with values in ±1 connected with the metaplectic cocycle.

In fact given non-zero vectors u, v in the plane, define f(u,v) to be

- i times the sign of B(u,v) if u and v are not proportional
- the sign of λ if u = λv.

If

$$b(g)=f(u_0, gu_0),$$

then

$$\Omega(g,h)^2 =b(gh)b(g)^{-1}b(h)^{-1}.$$

The representatives π(g) in the metaplectic representation can be chosen so that

$$\pi(gh) =\omega(g,h) \pi(g)\pi(h)$$

where the 2-cocycle ω is given by

$$\omega(g,h) =\Omega(g,h) \beta(gh)^{-1}\beta(g)\beta(h),$$

with

$$\beta(g)^{2}=b(g).$$

== Holomorphic Fock space ==
Holomorphic Fock space (also known as the Segal–Bargmann space) is defined to be the vector space $\mathcal F$ of holomorphic functions f(z) on C with

$${1\over \pi} \iint_{\mathbf C} |f(z)|^2 e^{-|z|^2} \, dxdy$$

finite. It has inner product

$$(f_1,f_2)= {1\over \pi} \iint_{\mathbf C} f_1(z)\overline{f_2(z)} e^{-|z|^2} \, dxdy.$$

$\mathcal F$ is a Hilbert space with orthonormal basis

$$e_n(z)={z^n\over \sqrt{n!}}, \quad n \ge 0.$$

Moreover, the power series expansion of a holomorphic function in $\mathcal F$ gives its expansion with respect to this basis. Thus for z in C

$$|f(z)| =\left|\sum_{n\ge 0} a_n z^n\right|\le \|f\| e^{|z|^2/2},$$

so that evaluation at z is gives a continuous linear functional on $\mathcal F.$ In fact

$$f(a) =(f,E_a)$$

where

$$E_a(z)=\sum_{n\ge 0} {(E_a,e_n)z^n\over \sqrt{n!}}=\sum_{n\ge 0} {z^n\overline{a}^n\over n!} = e^{z\overline{a}}.$$

Thus in particular $\mathcal F$ is a reproducing kernel Hilbert space.

For f in $\mathcal F$ and z in C define

$$W_{\mathcal F}(z)f(w)=e^{-|z|^2/2} e^{w\overline{z}} f(w-z).$$

Then

$$W_{\mathcal F}(z_1)W_{\mathcal F}(z_2)= e^{-i\Im z_1\overline{z_2}}  W_{\mathcal F}(z_1+z_2),$$

so this gives a unitary representation of the Weyl commutation relations. Now

$$W_{\mathcal F}(a)E_0=e^{-|a|^2/2} E_a.$$

It follows that the representation $W_{\mathcal F}$ is irreducible.

Indeed, any function orthogonal to all the E_{a} must vanish, so that their linear span is dense in $\mathcal F$.

If P is an orthogonal projection commuting with W(z), let f = PE_{0}. Then

$$f(z)=(PE_0,E_z)=e^{|z|^2}(PE_0,W_{\mathcal F}(z)E_0)=(PE_{-z},E_0)=\overline{f(-z)}.$$

The only holomorphic function satisfying this condition is the constant function. So

$$PE_0=\lambda E_0,$$

with λ = 0 or 1. Since E_{0} is cyclic, it follows that P = 0 or I.

By the Stone–von Neumann theorem there is a unitary operator $\mathcal U$ from L^{2}(R) onto $\mathcal F$, unique up to multiplication by a scalar, intertwining the two representations of the Weyl commutation relations. By Schur's lemma and the Gelfand–Naimark construction, the matrix coefficient of any vector determines the vector up to a scalar multiple. Since the matrix coefficients of F = E_{0} and f = H_{0} are equal, it follows that the unitary $\mathcal U$ is uniquely determined by the properties

$$W_{\mathcal F}(a) \mathcal{U} = \mathcal{U} W(a)$$

and

$$\mathcal{U}H_0 = E_0.$$

Hence for f in L^{2}(R)

$$\mathcal{U}f(z)= (\mathcal{U}f,E_z) = (f,\mathcal{U}^* E_z) = e^{-|z|^2}(f,\mathcal{U}^* W_{\mathcal F}(z)E_0) =e^{-|z|^2}(W(-z)f,H_0),$$

so that

$$\mathcal{U}f(z) ={1\over \sqrt{2\pi}}\int_{-\infty}^\infty e^{-(x^2 +y^2)} e^{-2ixy}f(t+x) e^{-t^2/2} \, dt ={1\over \sqrt{2\pi}}\int_{-\infty}^\infty B(z,t) f(t)\, dt,$$

where

$$B(z,t)= \exp [-z^2 -t^2/2 +zt].$$

The operator $\mathcal U$ is called the Segal–Bargmann transform and B is called the Bargmann kernel.

The adjoint of $\mathcal U$ is given by the formula:

$$\mathcal{U}^*F(t)={1\over \pi} \iint_{\mathbf C} B(\overline{z},t) F(z)\, dx dy.$$

== Fock model ==
The action of SU(1,1) on holomorphic Fock space was described by Bargmann (1970) and Itzykson (1967).

The metaplectic double cover of SU(1,1) can be constructed explicitly as pairs (g, γ) with

$$g=\begin{pmatrix} \alpha & \beta \\ \overline{\beta} & \overline{\alpha} \end{pmatrix}$$

and

$$\gamma^2=\alpha.$$

If g = g_{1}g_{2}, then

$$\gamma = \gamma_1\gamma_2\left(1 +{\beta_1\overline{\beta_2}\over \alpha_1\alpha_2}\right)^{1/2},$$

using the power series expansion of (1 + z)^{1/2} for |z| < 1.

The metaplectic representation is a unitary representation π(g, γ) of this group satisfying the covariance relations

$$\pi(g,\gamma) W_{\mathcal F}(z) \pi(g,\gamma)^*=  W_{\mathcal F}(g\cdot z),$$

where

$$g\cdot z=\alpha z + \beta \overline{z}.$$

Since $\mathcal F$ is a reproducing kernel Hilbert space, any bounded operator T on it corresponds to a kernel given by a power series of its two arguments. In fact if

$$K_T(a,b)=(TE_{\overline{b}},E_a),$$

and F in $\mathcal F$, then

$$TF(a)=(TF,E_a)=(F,T^*E_a)=\frac{1}{\pi} \iint_{\mathbf C} F(z)\overline{(T^*E_a,E_z)} e^{-|z|^2}\, dx dy=\frac{1}{\pi} \iint_{\mathbf C} K_T(a,\overline{z}) F(z)e^{-|z|^2}\, dxdy.$$

The covariance relations and analyticity of the kernel imply that for S = π(g, γ),

$$K_S(a,z)=C \cdot \exp\,{1\over 2\alpha}(\overline{\beta} z^2 + 2az - \beta a^2)$$

for some constant C. Direct calculation shows that

$$C=\gamma^{-1}$$

leads to an ordinary representation of the double cover.

Coherent states can again be defined as the orbit of E_{0} under the metaplectic group.

For w complex, set

$$F_w(z)=e^{wz^2/2}.$$

Then $F_w \in \mathcal F$ if and only if |w| < 1. In particular F_{0} = 1 = E_{0}. Moreover,

$$\pi(g,\gamma)F_w= (\overline{\alpha} +\overline{\beta}w)^{-\frac{1}{2}} F_{gw}=\frac{1}{\overline{\gamma}} \left(1+{\overline{\beta}\over \overline{\alpha}}w\right)^{-1/2}F_{gw},$$

where

$$gw={\alpha w + \beta\over \overline{\beta}w + \overline{\alpha}}.$$

Similarly the functions zF_{w} lie in $\mathcal F$ and form an orbit of the metaplectic group:

$$\pi(g,\gamma)[zF_w](z)= (\overline{\alpha} +\overline{\beta}w)^{-3/2} zF_{gw}(z).$$

Since (F_{w}, E_{0}) = 1, the matrix coefficient of the function E_{0} = 1 is given by

$$(\pi(g,\gamma)1,1)=\gamma^{-1}.$$

== Disk model ==
The projective representation of SL(2,R) on L^{2}(R) or on $\mathcal F$ break up as a direct sum of two irreducible representations, corresponding to even and odd functions of x or z. The two representations can be realized on Hilbert spaces of holomorphic functions on the unit disk; or, using the Cayley transform, on the upper half plane.

The even functions correspond to holomorphic functions F_{+} for which

$${1\over 2\pi}\iint |F_+(z)|^2 (1-|z|^2)^{-1/2} \,dx dy+ {2\over \pi} \iint |F'_+(z)|^2(1-|z|^2)^{\frac{1}{2}} \, dxdy$$

is finite; and the odd functions to holomorphic functions F_{–} for which

$${1\over 2\pi}\iint |F_-(z)|^2 (1-|z|^2)^{-1/2} \,dx dy$$

is finite. The polarized forms of these expressions define the inner products.

The action of the metaplectic group is given by

$$\begin{align}
\pi_\pm(g^{-1})F_\pm(z) &= \left (\overline{\beta} z + \overline{\alpha} \right )^{-1\pm \frac{1}{2}} F_\pm(gz) \\
& = \left (-\overline{\beta} z + \alpha \right)^{-1\pm \frac{1}{2}} F_\pm\left({\overline{\alpha} z -\beta\over -\overline{\beta} z + \alpha}\right) && g= \begin{pmatrix} \alpha & \beta \\ \overline{\beta} & \overline{\alpha}\end{pmatrix}
\end{align}$$

Irreducibility of these representations is established in a standard way. Each representation breaks up as a direct sum of one dimensional eigenspaces of the rotation group each of which is generated by a C^{∞} vector for the whole group. It follows that any closed invariant subspace is generated by the algebraic direct sum of eigenspaces it contains and that this sum is invariant under the infinitesimal action of the Lie algebra $\mathfrak g$. On the other hand, that action is irreducible.

The isomorphism with even and odd functions in $\mathcal F$ can be proved using the Gelfand–Naimark construction since the matrix coefficients associated to 1 and z in the corresponding representations are proportional. Itzykson (1967) gave another method starting from the maps

$$U_+(F)(w)=\frac{1}{\pi} \iint_{\mathbf C} F(z) e^{\frac{1}{2} w\overline{z}^2} e^{-|z|^2} \, dx dy,$$
$$U_-(F)(w)=\frac{1}{\pi} \iint_{\mathbf C} F(z) \overline{z}e^{\frac{1}{2} w \overline{z}^2} e^{-|z|^2} \, dx dy,$$

from the even and odd parts to functions on the unit disk. These maps intertwine the actions of the metaplectic group given above and send z^{n} to a multiple of w^{n}. Stipulating that U_{±} should be unitary determines the inner products on functions on the disk, which can expressed in the form above.

Although in these representations the operator L_{0} has positive spectrum—the feature that distinguishes the holomorphic discrete series representations of SU(1,1)—the representations do not lie in the discrete series of the metaplectic group. Indeed, Kashiwara & Vergne (1978) noted that the matrix coefficients are not square integrable, although their third power is.

== Harmonic oscillator and Hermite functions ==
Consider the following subspace of L^{2}(R):

$$\mathcal{H} = \left \{ f \in L^2(\mathbf{R}) \left | f(x)=p(x)e^{-\frac{x^2}{2}}, p(x) \in \mathbf{R}[x] \right. \right\}.$$

The operators

$$\begin{align}
X &=Q-iP={d\over dx} + x \\
Y &=Q+iP =-{d\over dx} +x
\end{align}$$

act on $\mathcal{H}.$ X is called the annihilation operator and Y the creation operator. They satisfy

$$\begin{align}
X  &= Y^* \\
XY &= D +I  && D=-{d^2\over dx^2} + x^2\\
XY-YX &=2I \\
XY^n-Y^nX &=2n Y^{n-1} && \text{by induction}
\end{align}$$

Define the functions

$$F_n(x) = Y^n e^{-\frac{x^2}{2}}$$

We claim they are the eigenfunctions of the harmonic oscillator, D. To prove this we use the commutation relations above:

$$\begin{align}
DF_n &= D Y^nF_0 \\
&= (XY-I)Y^n F_0 \\
&=\left ( XY^{n+1} -Y^n \right) F_0 \\
&=\left ( \left ((2n+2)Y^n + Y^{n+1}X \right )-Y^n \right) F_0 \\
&=\left ( (2n+1)Y^n + Y^{n+1}X \right) F_0 \\
&= (2n+1)Y^nF_0 + Y^{n+1}X F_0 \\
&=(2n+1)F_n && XF_0 =0
\end{align}$$

Next we have:

$$\|F_n\|^2_2=2^n n!\sqrt{\pi}.$$

This is known for n = 0 and the commutation relation above yields

$$(F_n,F_n)= \left (XY^n F_0,Y^{n-1}F_0 \right )=2n (F_{n-1},F_{n-1}).$$

The nth Hermite function is defined by

$$H_n(x)=\|F_n\|^{-1}F_n(x) =p_n(x) e^{-\frac{x^2}{2}}.$$

p_{n} is called the nth Hermite polynomial.

Let

$$\begin{align}
A   &={1\over\sqrt{2}}Y={1\over\sqrt{2}}\left(-{d\over dx} +x\right) \\
A^* &={1\over\sqrt{2}}X={1\over\sqrt{2}}\left({d\over dx} +x\right)
\end{align}$$

Thus

$$AA^*-A^*A=I.$$

The operators P, Q or equivalently A, A* act irreducibly on $\mathcal H$ by a standard argument.

Indeed, under the unitary isomorphism with holomorphic Fock space $\mathcal H$ can be identified with C[z], the space of polynomials in z, with

$$A= \frac{\partial}{\partial z},\qquad A^*=z.$$

If a subspace invariant under A and A* contains a non-zero polynomial p(z), then, applying a power of A*, it contains a non-zero constant; applying then a power of A, it contains all z^{n}.

Under the isomorphism F_{n} is sent to a multiple of z^{n} and the operator D is given by

$$D=2A^*A+I.$$

Let

$$L_0={1\over 2}( A^*A + {1\over 2}) ={1\over 2} ( z{\partial\over\partial z} + {1\over 2})$$

so that

$$L_0z^n={1\over 2}(n + {1\over 2})z^n.$$

In the terminology of physics A, A* give a single boson and L_{0} is the energy operator. It is diagonalizable with eigenvalues 1/2, 1, 3/2, ...., each of multiplicity one. Such a representation is called a positive energy representation.

Moreover,

$$[L_0,A]=-{1\over 2}A, [L_0,A^*]={1\over 2} A^*,$$

so that the Lie bracket with L_{0} defines a derivation of the Lie algebra spanned by A, A* and I. Adjoining L_{0} gives the semidirect product. The infinitesimal version of the Stone–von Neumann theorem states that the above representation on C[z] is the unique irreducible positive energy representation of this Lie algebra with L_{0} = A*A + 1/2. For A lowers energy and A* raises energy. So any lowest energy vector v is annihilated by A and the module is exhausted by the powers of A* applied to v. It is thus a non-zero quotient of C[z] and hence can be identified with it by irreducibility.

Let

$$L_{-1}={1\over 2}A^2, L_{1}={1\over 2} A^{*2},$$

so that

$$[L_{-1},A]=0,\,\,\, [L_{-1},A^*]=A,\,\,\, [L_1,A]=-A^*, \,\,\, [L_1,A^*]=0.$$

These operators satisfy:

$$[L_m,L_n]=(m-n)L_{m+n}$$

and act by derivations on the Lie algebra spanned by A, A* and I.

They are the infinitesimal operators corresponding to the metaplectic representation of SU(1,1).

The functions F_{n} are defined by

$$F_n(x)= \left(x-{d\over dx}\right)^n e^{-\frac{x^2}{2}} = (-1)^ne^{\frac{x^2}{2}} {d^n\over dx^n} \left (e^{-x^2} \right) = \left (2^nx^n + \cdots \right )e^{-\frac{x^2}{2}}.$$

It follows that the Hermite functions are the orthonormal basis obtained by applying the Gram-Schmidt orthonormalization process to the basis x^{n} exp -x^{2}/2 of $\mathcal H$.

The completeness of the Hermite functions follows from the fact that the Bargmann transform is unitary and carries the orthonormal basis e_{n}(z) of holomorphic Fock space onto the H_{n}(x).

The heat operator for the harmonic oscillator is the operator on L^{2}(R) defined as the diagonal operator

$$e^{-Dt}H_n=e^{-(2n+1)t}H_n.$$

It corresponds to the heat kernel given by Mehler's formula:

$$K_t(x,y)\equiv\sum_{n\ge 0} e^{-(2n+1)t}H_n(x)H_n(y)=(4\pi t)^{-{1\over 2}} \left({2t\over \sinh 2t}\right)^{1\over 2} \exp  \left(-{1\over 4t} \left[{2t\over \tanh 2t}(x^2+y^2) - {2t\over \sinh 2t}(2xy)\right]\right).$$

This follows from the formula

$$\sum_{n\ge 0} s^n H_n(x)H_n(y)= {1\over \sqrt{\pi(1-s^2)}} \exp {4xys - (1+s^2)(x^2+y^2)\over 2(1-s^2)}.$$

To prove this formula note that if s = σ^{2}, then by Taylor's formula

$$F_{\sigma,x}(z)\equiv \sum_{n\ge 0} \sigma^n e_n(z) H_n(x)= \pi^{-{1\over 4}} e^{-\frac{x^2}{2}}\sum_{n\ge 0} {(-z)^n \sigma^n \over 2^n n!}{d^n e^{x^2}\over dx^n} = \pi^{-\frac{1}{4}} \exp \left (-{x^2\over 2} +\sqrt{2} xz\sigma -{z^2\sigma^2\over 2} \right ).$$

Thus F_{σ,x} lies in holomorphic Fock space and

$$\sum_{n\ge 0} s^n H_n(x)H_n(y) = (F_{\sigma,x},F_{\sigma,y})_{\mathcal F},$$

an inner product that can be computed directly.

Wiener (1933, pp. 51–67) establishes Mehler's formula directly and uses a classical argument to prove that

$$\int K_t(x,y)f(y)\, dy$$

tends to f in L^{2}(R) as t decreases to 0. This shows the completeness of the Hermite functions and also, since

$$\widehat{H_n}=(-i)^n H_n,$$

can be used to derive the properties of the Fourier transform.

There are other elementary methods for proving the completeness of the Hermite functions, for example using Fourier series.

== Sobolev spaces ==
The Sobolev spaces H_{s}, sometimes called Hermite-Sobolev spaces, are defined to be the completions of $\mathcal S$ with respect to the norms

$$\|f\|_{(s)}^2 = \sum_{n\ge 0} |a_n|^2 (1+2n)^s,$$

where

$$f=\sum a_n H_n$$

is the expansion of f in Hermite functions.

Thus

$$\|f\|_{(s)}^2 = (D^s f,f), \qquad (f_1,f_2)_{(s)}=(D^s f_1,f_2).$$

The Sobolev spaces are Hilbert spaces. Moreover, H_{s} and H_{–s} are in duality under the pairing

$$\langle f_1, f_2\rangle = \int f_1f_2 \, dx.$$

For s ≥ 0,

$$\|(aP +b Q)f\|_{(s)}\le (|a| + |b|) C_s \|f\|_{\left (s+{1\over 2} \right )}$$

for some positive constant C_{s}.

Indeed, such an inequality can be checked for creation and annihilation operators acting on Hermite functions H_{n} and this implies the general inequality.

It follows for arbitrary s by duality.

Consequently, for a quadratic polynomial R in P and Q

$$\|Rf\|_{(s)}\le C'_s \|f\|_{(s+1)}.$$

The Sobolev inequality holds for f in H_{s} with s > 1/2:

$$|f(x)|\le C_{s,k} \|f\|_{(s+k)} (1+x^2)^{-k}$$

for any k ≥ 0.

Indeed, the result for general k follows from the case k = 0 applied to Q^{k}f.

For k = 0 the Fourier inversion formula

$$f(x) = {1\over \sqrt{2\pi}}\int_{-\infty}^\infty \widehat{f}(t) e^{itx}\, dt$$

implies

$$|f(x)|\le C \left(\int \left |\widehat{f}(t) \right |^2 (1+t^2)^s\, dt\right)^{1\over 2}= C \left ( \left (I+Q^2 \right )^s \widehat{f}, \widehat{f} \right )^{1\over 2}\le C' \left \|\widehat{f} \right \|_{(s)} =C' \|f\|_{(s)}.$$

If s < t, the diagonal form of D, shows that the inclusion of H_{t} in H_{s} is compact (Rellich's lemma).

It follows from Sobolev's inequality that the intersection of the spaces H_{s} is $\mathcal S$. Functions in $\mathcal S$ are characterized by the rapid decay of their Hermite coefficients a_{n}.

Standard arguments show that each Sobolev space is invariant under the operators W(z) and the metaplectic group. Indeed, it is enough to check invariance when g is sufficiently close to the identity. In that case

$$gDg^{-1}=D + A$$

with D + A an isomorphism from $H_{t+2}$ to $H_t.$

It follows that

$$\|\pi(g)f\|^2_{(s)} = \left |((D+A)^sf,f) \right | \le  \left \|(D+A)^sf \right \|_{(-s)}\cdot\|f\|_{(s)} \le C\|f\|_{(s)}^2.$$

If $f\in H_s,$ then

$${d\over ds} U(s)f=iPU(s)f, \qquad {d\over dt}V(t) f=iQV(t)f,$$

where the derivatives lie in $H_{s-1/2}.$

Similarly the partial derivatives of total degree k of U(s)V(t)f lie in Sobolev spaces of order s–k/2.

Consequently, a monomial in P and Q of order 2k applied to f lies in H_{s–k} and can be expressed as a linear combination of partial derivatives of U(s)V(t)f of degree ≤ 2k evaluated at 0.

== Smooth vectors ==
The smooth vectors for the Weyl commutation relations are those u in L^{2}(R) such that the map

$$\Phi(z)=W(z)u$$

is smooth. By the uniform boundedness theorem, this is equivalent to the requirement that each matrix coefficient (W(z)u,v) be smooth.

A vector is smooth if and only it lies in $\mathcal S$. Sufficiency is clear. For necessity, smoothness implies that the partial derivatives of W(z)u lie in L^{2}(R) and hence also D^{k}u for all positive k. Hence u lies in the intersection of the H_{k}, so in $\mathcal S$.

It follows that smooth vectors are also smooth for the metaplectic group.

Moreover, a vector is in $\mathcal S$ if and only if it is a smooth vector for the rotation subgroup of SU(1,1).

== Analytic vectors ==
If Π(t) is a one parameter unitary group and for f in $\mathcal S$

$$\Pi(f)=\int_{-\infty}^\infty f(t)\Pi(t)\, dt,$$

then the vectors Π(f)ξ form a dense set of smooth vectors for Π.

In fact taking

$$f_\varepsilon(x)= {1\over \sqrt{2\pi \varepsilon}} e^{-x^2/2\varepsilon}$$

the vectors v = Π(f_{ε})ξ converge to ξ as ε decreases to 0 and

$$\Phi(t)=\Pi(t)v$$

is an analytic function of t that extends to an entire function on C.

The vector is called an entire vector for Π.

The wave operator associated to the harmonic oscillator is defined by

$$\Pi(t) = e^{it\sqrt{D}}.$$

The operator is diagonal with the Hermite functions H_{n} as eigenfunctions:

$$\Pi(t) H_n = e^{i(2n+1)^{1\over 2} t} H_n.$$

Since it commutes with D, it preserves the Sobolev spaces.

The analytic vectors constructed above can be rewritten in terms of the Hermite semigroup as

$$v=e^{-\varepsilon D}\xi.$$

The fact that v is an entire vector for Π is equivalent to the summability condition

$$\sum_{n\ge 0} {r^n \|D^{n \over 2}v\|\over n!} < \infty$$

for all r > 0.

Any such vector is also an entire vector for U(s)V(t), that is the map

$$F(s,t)=U(s)V(t)v$$

defined on R^{2} extends to an analytic map on C^{2}.

This reduces to the power series estimate

$$\left\|\sum_{m,n\ge 0} {1\over m! n!}z^m w^n P^m Q^n v\right\| \le C \sum_{k\ge 0} {(|z|+|w|)^k \over k!} \|D^{k\over 2} v\| <\infty.$$

So these form a dense set of entire vectors for U(s)V(t); this can also be checked directly using Mehler's formula.

The spaces of smooth and entire vectors for U(s)V(t) are each by definition invariant under the action of the metaplectic group as well as the Hermite semigroup.

Let

$$W(z,w)=e^{-izw/2} U(z)V(w)$$

be the analytic continuation of the operators W(x,y) from R^{2} to C^{2} such that

$$e^{-izw/2}F(z,w)=W(z,w)v.$$

Then W leaves the space of entire vectors invariant and satisfies

$$W(z_1,w_1)W(z_2,w_2)= e^{i(z_1w_2-w_1z_2)} W(z_1+z_2,w_1+w_2).$$

Moreover, for g in SL(2,R)

$$\pi(g) W(u)\pi(g)^*=W(gu),$$

using the natural action of SL(2,R) on C^{2}.

Formally

$$W(z,w)^*=W(-\overline{z},-\overline{w}).$$

== Oscillator semigroup ==
There is a natural double cover of the Olshanski semigroup H, and its closure $\overline{H}$ that extends the double cover of SU(1,1) corresponding to the metaplectic group. It is given by pairs (g, γ) where g is an element of H or its closure

$$g=\begin{pmatrix} a & b \\ c & d\end{pmatrix}$$

and γ is a square root of a.

Such a choice determines a unique branch of

$$\left(-\overline{b} z + \overline{d}\right)^{1\over 2}$$

for |z| < 1.

The unitary operators π(g) for g in SL(2,R) satisfy

$$\pi(g) W(u) =W(g\cdot u) \pi(g), \,\,\, \pi(g)^*W(u) =W(g^{-1}\cdot u)\pi(g)^*$$

for u in C^{2}.

An element g of the complexification SL(2,C) is said to implementable if there is a bounded operator T such that it and its adjoint leave the space of entire vectors for W invariant, both have dense images and satisfy the covariance relations

$$T W(u) =W(g\cdot u) T, \,\,\, T^* W(u) =W(g^{\dagger}\cdot u)T^*$$

for u in C^{2}. The implementing operator T is uniquely determined up to multiplication by a non-zero scalar.

The implementable elements form a semigroup, containing SL(2,R). Since the representation has positive energy, the bounded compact self-adjoint operators

$$S_0(t)=e^{-tL_0}$$

for t > 0 implement the group elements in exp C_{1}.

It follows that all elements of the Olshanski semigroup and its closure are implemented.

Maximality of the Olshanki semigroup implies that no other elements of SL(2,C) are implemented. Indeed, otherwise every element of SL(2,C) would be implemented by a bounded operator, which would contradict the non-invertibility of the operators S_{0}(t) for t > 0.

In the Schrödinger representation the operators S_{0}(t) for t > 0 are given by Mehler's formula. They are contraction operators, positive and in every Schatten class. Moreover, they leave invariant each of the Sobolev spaces. The same formula is true for $\Re\, t > 0$ by analytic continuation.

It can be seen directly in the Fock model that the implementing operators can be chosen so that they define an ordinary representation of the double cover of H constructed above. The corresponding semigroup of contraction operators is called the oscillator semigroup. The extended oscillator semigroup is obtained by taking the semidirect product with the operators W(u). These operators lie in every Schatten class and leave invariant the Sobolev spaces and the space of entire vectors for W.

The decomposition

$$\overline{H} = G\cdot \exp \overline{C}$$

corresponds at the operator level to the polar decomposition of bounded operators.

Moreover, since any matrix in H is conjugate to a diagonal matrix by elements in H or H^{−1}, every operator in the oscillator semigroup is quasi-similar to an operator S_{0}(t) with $\Re t > 0$. In particular it has the same spectrum consisting of simple eigenvalues.

In the Fock model, if the element g of the Olshanki semigroup H corresponds to the matrix

$$\begin{pmatrix} a & b \\ c & d\end{pmatrix},$$

the corresponding operator is given by

$$\pi(g,\gamma)f(w) = {1\over \pi}\iint_{\mathbf C} K(w,\overline{z}) f(z) e^{-|z|^2}\,dxdy,$$

where

$$K(w,z)=\gamma^{-1} \cdot \exp\,{1\over 2a}(c z^2 + 2wz - b w^2)$$

and γ is a square root of a. Operators π(g,γ) for g in the semigroup H are exactly those that are Hilbert–Schmidt operators and correspond to kernels of the form

$$K(w,z)=C\cdot \exp\,{1\over 2}(p z^2 + 2qwz + r w^2)$$

for which the complex symmetric matrix

$$\begin{pmatrix} p& q \\ q & r\end{pmatrix}$$

has operator norm strictly less than one.

Operators in the extended oscillator semigroup are given by similar expressions with additional linear terms in z and w appearing in the exponential.

In the disk model for the two irreducible components of the metaplectic representation, the corresponding operators are given by

$$\pi_\pm(g)F_\pm(z)= (-\overline{b} z + \overline{d})^{-1\pm 1/2} F_\pm\left({\overline{a} z -\overline{c}\over -\overline{b} z + \overline{d}}\right).$$

It is also possible to give an explicit formula for the contraction operators corresponding to g in H in the Schrödinger representation, It was by this formula that Howe (1988) introduced the oscillator semigroup as an explicit family of operators on L^{2}(R).

In fact consider the Siegel upper half plane consisting of symmetric complex 2x2 matrices with positive definite real part:

$$Z=\begin{pmatrix}A & B \\ B & D\end{pmatrix}$$

and define the kernel

$$K_Z(x,y)=e^{-(Ax^2 +2B xy +Dy^2)}.$$

with corresponding operator

$$T_Zf(x)=\int_{-\infty}^\infty K_Z(x,y)f(y)\, dy$$

for f in L^{2}(R).

Then direct computation gives

$$T_{Z_1}T_{Z_2}=(D_1+A_2)^{-1/2}T_{Z_3}$$

where

$$Z_3=\begin{pmatrix} A_1 -B_1^2(D_1+A_2)^{-1} &-B_1B_2(D_1+A_2)^{-1} \\-B_1B_2(D_1+A_2)^{-1} & D_2 -B_2^2(D_1+A_2)^{-1}\end{pmatrix}.$$

Moreover,

$$T_Z^*= T_{Z^+}$$

where

$$Z^+=\begin{pmatrix} \overline{D} & \overline{B} \\ \overline{B} & \overline{A}\end{pmatrix}.$$

By Mehler's formula for $\Re\, t > 0$

$$e^{-t(P^2+Q^2)} = (\mathrm{cosech}\, 2t)^{1\over 2}\cdot T_{Z(t)}$$

with

$$Z(t)=\begin{pmatrix} \coth 2t & -\mathrm{ cosech}\, 2t \\  -\mathrm{ cosech}\, 2t & \coth 2t\end{pmatrix}.$$

The oscillator semigroup is obtained by taking only matrices with B ≠ 0. From the above, this condition is closed under composition.

A normalized operator can be defined by

$$S_Z=B^{1\over 2}\cdot T_Z.$$

The choice of a square root determines a double cover.

In this case S_{Z} corresponds to the element

$$g=\begin{pmatrix} -DB^{-1} & DAB^{-1}-B \\ B^{-1} & -AB^{-1}\end{pmatrix}$$

of the Olshankii semigroup H.

Moreover, S_{Z} is a strict contraction:

$$\|S_Z\|<1.$$

It follows also that

$$S_{Z_1} S_{Z_2} =\pm S_{Z_3}.$$

== Weyl calculus ==
For a function a(x,y) on R^{2} = C, let

$$\psi(a)={1\over 2\pi}\int\widehat{a}(x,y) W(x,y)\, dx dy.$$

So

$$\psi(a)f(x) =\int K(x,y)f(y)\, dy,$$

where

$$K(x,y)=\int a (t, {x+y\over 2})e^{i(x-y)t}\, dt.$$

Defining in general

$$W(F)={1\over 2\pi} \int F(z)W(z)\,dxdy,$$

the product of two such operators is given by the formula

$$W(F)W(G)=W(F\star G),$$

where the twisted convolution or Moyal product is given by

$$F\star G(z)={1\over 2\pi}  \int F(z_1)G(z_2-z_1) e^{i(x_1y_2-y_1x_2)}\, dx_1dy_1.$$

The smoothing operators correspond to W(F) or ψ(a) with F or a Schwartz functions on R^{2}. The corresponding operators T have kernels that are Schwartz functions. They carry each Sobolev space into the Schwartz functions. Moreover, every bounded operator on L^{2} (R) having this property has this form.

For the operators ψ(a) the Moyal product translates into the Weyl symbolic calculus. Indeed, if the Fourier transforms of a and b have compact support then

$$\psi(a)\psi(b) =\psi(a\circ b),$$

where

$$a\circ b= \sum_{n\ge 0} {i^n\over n!} \left({\partial^2\over \partial x_1\partial y_2} -{\partial^2\over \partial y_1\partial x_2}\right)^n a\otimes b|_{\mathrm{diagonal}}.$$

This follows because in this case b must extend to an entire function on C^{2} by the Paley-Wiener theorem.

This calculus can be extended to a broad class of symbols, but the simplest corresponds to convolution by a class of functions or distributions that all have the form T + S where T is a distribution of compact with singular support concentrated at 0 and where S is a Schwartz function. This class contains the operators P, Q as well as D^{1/2} and D^{−1/2} where D is the harmonic oscillator.

The mth order symbols S^{m} are given by smooth functions a satisfying

$$|\partial^\alpha a(z)| \le C_\alpha (1+|z|)^{m-|\alpha|}$$

for all α and Ψ^{m} consists of all operators ψ(a) for such a.

If a is in S^{m} and χ is a smooth function of compact support equal to 1 near 0, then

$$\widehat{a} =\chi \widehat{a} + (1-\chi)\widehat{a}=T+S,$$

with T and S as above.

These operators preserve the Schwartz functions and satisfy;

$$\Psi^m\cdot \Psi^m \subseteq \Psi^{m+n},\,\,\,\, [\Psi^m,\Psi^n]\subseteq \Psi^{m+n-2}.$$

The operators P and Q lie in Ψ^{1} and D lies in Ψ^{2}.

Properties:

- A zeroth order symbol defines a bounded operator on L^{2}(R).
- D^{−1} lies in Ψ^{−2}
- If R = R* is smoothing, then D + R has a complete set of eigenvectors f_{n} in $\mathcal{S}$ with (D + R)f_{n} = λ_{n}f_{n} and λ_{n} tends to ≈ as n tends to ≈.
- D^{1/2} lies in Ψ^{1} and hence D^{−1/2} lies in Ψ^{−1}, since D^{−1/2} = D^{1/2} ·D^{−1}
- Ψ^{−1} consists of compact operators, Ψ^{−s} consists of trace-class operators for s > 1 and Ψ^{k} carries H_{m} into H_{m–k}.
- $\mathrm{Tr}\, \psi(a) = \int a$

The proof of boundedness of Howe (1980) is particularly simple: if

$$T_{a,b} v=(v,b)a,$$

then

$$T_{W(z)a,b}=e^{|z|^2/2} [W(z) T_{a,E_0}W(z)^{-1}T_{E_0,b}],$$

where the bracketed operator has norm less than $\|a\|\cdot \|b\|$. So if F is supported in |z| ≤ R, then

$$\|W(F)\| \le e^{R^2/2}\|\widehat{F}\|_\infty.$$

The property of D^{−1} is proved by taking

$$S=\psi(a)$$

with

$$a(z)={1\over |z|^2 +1}.$$

Then R = I – DS lies in Ψ^{−1}, so that

$$A\sim S + SR +SR^2 + \cdots$$

lies in Ψ^{−2} and T = DA – I is smoothing. Hence

$$D^{-1}= A - D^{-1}T$$

lies in Ψ^{−2} since D^{−1} T is smoothing.

The property for D^{1/2} is established similarly by constructing B in Ψ^{1/2} with real symbol such that D – B^{4} is a smoothing operator. Using the holomorphic functional calculus it can be checked that D^{1/2} – B^{2} is a smoothing operator.

The boundedness result above was used by Howe (1980) to establish the more general inequality of Alberto Calderón and Remi Vaillancourt for pseudodifferential operators. An alternative proof that applies more generally to Fourier integral operators was given by Howe (1988). He showed that such operators can be expressed as integrals over the oscillator semigroup and then estimated using the Cotlar-Stein lemma.

== Applications and generalizations ==
=== Theory for finite abelian groups ===
Weil (1964) noted that the formalism of the Stone–von Neumann theorem and the oscillator representation of the symplectic group extends from the real numbers R to any locally compact abelian group. A particularly simple example is provided by finite abelian groups, where the proofs are either elementary or simplifications of the proofs for R.

Let A be a finite abelian group, written additively, and let Q be a non-degenerate quadratic form on A with values in T. Thus

$$(a,b)=Q(a)Q(b)Q(a+b)^{-1}$$

is a symmetric bilinear form on A that is non-degenerate, so permits an identification between A and its dual group A* = Hom (A, T).

Let $V=\ell^2(A)$ be the space of complex-valued functions on A with inner product

$$(f,g)=\sum_{x\in A} f(x)\overline{g(x)}.$$

Define operators on V by

$$U(x) f(t)= f(t-x),\,\,\, V(y)f(t)=(y,t) f(t)$$

for x, y in A. Then U(x) and V(y) are unitary representations of A on V satisfying the commutation relations

$$U(x)V(y)=(x,y) V(y) U(x).$$

This action is irreducible and is the unique such irreducible representation of these relations.

Let G = A × A and for z = (x, y) in G set

$$W(z)=U(x)V(y).$$

Then

$$W(z_1)W(z_2)= B(z_1,z_2) W(z_2)W(z_1),$$

where

$$B(z_1,z_2)=(x_1,y_2)(x_2,y_1)^{-1},$$

a non-degenerate alternating bilinear form on G. The uniqueness result above implies that if W'(z) is another family of unitaries giving a projective representation of G such that

$$W'(z_1)W'(z_2)= B(z_1,z_2) W'(z_2)W'(z_1),$$

then there is a unitary U, unique up to a phase, such that

$$W'(z)=\lambda(z) UW(z)U^*,$$

for some λ(z) in T.

In particular if g is an automorphism of G preserving B, then there is an essentially unique unitary π(g) such that

$$W(gz)=\lambda_g(z)\pi(g) W(z)\pi(g)^*.$$

The group of all such automorphisms is called the symplectic group for B and π gives a projective representation of G on V.

The group SL(2.Z) naturally acts on G = A x A by symplectic automorphisms. It is generated by the matrices

$$S=\begin{pmatrix} 0 & 1 \\ -1 & 0\end{pmatrix},\qquad R=\begin{pmatrix} 1 & 0 \\ 1 & 1\end{pmatrix}.$$

If Z = –I, then Z is central and

$${S^2=Z,\,\,\, (SR)^3 =Z,\,\,\, Z^2 =I.}$$

These automorphisms of G are implemented on V by the following operators:

$$\begin{align}
\pi(S)f(t) &= |A|^{-\frac{1}{2}} \sum_{x\in A} (-x,t)f(x) && \text{the Fourier transform for } A \\
\pi(Z)f(t) &= f(-t) \\
\pi(R)f(t) &= Q(t)^{-1} f(t) \\
\end{align}$$

It follows that

$$(\pi(S)\pi(R))^3 =\mu \pi(Z),$$

where μ lies in T. Direct calculation shows that μ is given by the Gauss sum

$$\mu=|A|^{-\frac{1}{2}} \sum_{x\in A} Q(x).$$

=== Transformation laws for theta functions ===
The metaplectic group was defined as the group

$$\operatorname{Mp}(2,\mathbf R)= \left \{ \left ( \left. \begin{pmatrix} a & b \\ c & d\end{pmatrix},G \right ) \right | G(\tau)^2=c\tau +d, \tau \in \mathbf{H} \right \},$$

The coherent state

$$f_\tau(x) = e^{\frac{1}{2}i\tau x^2}$$

defines a holomorphic map of H into L^{2}(R) satisfying

$$\pi((g^t)^{-1})f_\tau= (c\tau+d)^{-\frac{1}{2}}f_{g\tau}.$$

This is in fact a holomorphic map into each Sobolev space H_{k} and hence also $H_{\approx} =\mathcal{S}$.

On the other hand, in $H_{-\approx} = \mathcal{S}'$ (in fact in H_{–1}) there is a finite-dimensional space of distributions invariant under SL(2,Z) and isomorphic to the N-dimensional oscillator representation on $\ell^2(A)$ where A = Z/NZ.

In fact let m > 0 and set N = 2m. Let

$$M=\sqrt{2\pi m}\cdot\mathbf{Z}.$$

The operators U(x), V(y) with x and y in M all commute and have a finite-dimensional subspace of fixed vectors formed by the distributions

$$\Psi_{b}=\sum_{x\in M} \delta_{x+b}$$

with b in M_{1}, where

$$M_1 ={1\over 2m}M \supset M.$$

The sum defining Ψ_{b} converges in $H_{-1} \subset \mathcal{S}'$ and depends only on the class of b in M_{1}/M. On the other hand, the operators U(x) and V(y) with 'x, y in M_{1} commute with all the corresponding operators for M. So M_{1} leaves the subspace V_{0} spanned by the Ψ_{b} invariant. Hence the group A = M_{1} acts on V_{0}. This action can immediately be identified with the action on V for the N-dimensional oscillator representation associated with A, since

$$U(b)\Psi_{b'} =\Psi_{b+b'},\qquad V(b)\Psi_{b'}=e^{-imbb'} \Psi_{b'}.$$

Since the operators π(R) and π(S) normalise the two sets of operators U and V corresponding to M and M_{1}, it follows that they leave V_{0} invariant and on V_{0} must be constant multiples of the operators associated with the oscillator representation of A. In fact they coincide. From R this is immediate from the definitions, which show that

$$R(\Psi_b) = e^{\pi imb^2} \Psi_b.$$

For S it follows from the Poisson summation formula and the commutation properties with the operators U)x) and V(y). The Poisson summation is proved classically as follows.

For a > 0 and f in $\mathcal{S}$ let

$$F(t)=\sum_{x\in M} f(x+t).$$

F is a smooth function on R with period a:

$$F(t+a)=F(t).$$

The theory of Fourier series shows that

$$F(0)= \sum_{n\in \mathbf{Z}} c_n$$

with the sum absolutely convergent and the Fourier coefficients given by

$$c_n = a^{-1} \int_0^a F(t) e^{-\frac{2\pi int}{a}}\, dt= a^{-1} \int_{-\infty}^\infty f(t) e^{-\frac{2\pi int}{a}}\, dt={\sqrt{2\pi}\over a} \widehat{f} \left (\tfrac{2\pi n}{a} \right).$$

Hence

$$\sum_{n\in \mathbf{Z}} f(na)= \frac{\sqrt{2\pi}}{a} \sum_{n\in \mathbf{Z}} \widehat{f} \left (\tfrac{2\pi n}{a} \right ),$$

the usual Poisson summation formula.

This formula shows that S acts as follows

$$S(\Psi_b)=(2m)^{-\frac{1}{2}} \sum_{b'\in M_1/M} e^{- i m bb'} \Psi_{b'},$$

and so agrees exactly with formula for the oscillator representation on A.

Identifying A with Z/2mZ, with

$$b(n)=\frac{\sqrt{2\pi} n}{2m}$$

assigned to an integer n modulo 2m, the theta functions can be defined directly as matrix coefficients:

$$\Theta_{m,n}(\tau,z)=(W(z)f_\tau,\Psi_{b(n)}).$$

For τ in H and z in C set

$$q=e^{2\pi i \tau},\qquad u=e^{\pi iz}$$

so that |q| < 1. The theta functions agree with the standard classical formulas for the Jacobi-Riemann theta functions:

$$\Theta_{n,m} (\tau,z) = \sum_{k\in \frac{n}{2m} + \mathbf{Z}} q^{mk^2} u^{2mk}.$$

By definition they define holomorphic functions on H × C. The covariance properties of the function f_{τ} and the distribution Ψ_{b} lead immediately to the following transformation laws:

$$\begin{align}
\Theta_{n,m}(\tau, z + a)   &= \Theta_{n,m}(\tau,z) && a \in \mathbf{Z} \\
\Theta_{n,m}(\tau, z+b\tau) &= q^{-b^2} u^{-b}\Theta_{n,m}(\tau,z) && b \in \mathbf{Z} \\
\Theta_{n,m}(\tau + 1, z)   &= e^{\frac{\pi i n^2}{m}} \Theta_{n,m}(\tau,z) \\
\Theta_{n,m}(-\tfrac{1}{\tau},\tfrac{z}{\tau}) &= \tau^{\frac{1}{2}}e^{-\frac{i\pi}{8}} (2m)^{-\frac{1}{2}} \sum_{n'\in \mathbf{Z}/2m\mathbf{Z}} e^{-\frac{\pi inn'}{m}} \Theta_{n',m}(\tau,z)
\end{align}$$

=== Derivation of law of quadratic reciprocity ===
Because the operators π(S), π (R) and π(J) on L^{2}(R) restrict to the corresponding operators on V_{0} for any choice of m, signs of cocycles can be determined by taking m = 1. In this case the representation is 2-dimensional and the relation

$${(\pi(S)\pi(R))^3 =\pi(J)}$$

on L^{2}(R) can be checked directly on V_{0}.

But in this case

$$\mu= \frac{1}{\sqrt{2}} \left (e^{\frac{i\pi}{4}} +e^{-\frac{i\pi}{4}} \right )=1.$$

The relation can also be checked directly by applying both sides to the ground state exp -x^{2}/2.

Consequently, it follows that for m ≥ 1 the Gauss sum can be evaluated:

$$\sum_{x\in \mathbf{Z}/2m\mathbf{Z}} e^{\pi i x^2/2m} = \sqrt{m}(1+i).$$

For m odd, define

$${G(c,m)=\sum_{x\in \mathbf{Z}/m\mathbf{Z}} e^{2\pi i c x^2/m}.}$$

If m is odd, then, splitting the previous sum up into two parts, it follows that G(1,m) equals m^{1/2} if m is congruent to 1 mod 4 and equals i m^{1/2} otherwise. If p is an odd prime and c is not divisible by p, this implies

$${G(c,p)= \left({c\over p}\right)G(1,p)}$$

where $\left({c\over p}\right)$ is the Legendre symbol equal to 1 if c is a square mod p and –1 otherwise. Moreover, if p and q are distinct odd primes, then

$${G(1,pq)/G(1,p)G(1,q) = \left({p\over q}\right)\left({q\over p}\right)}.$$

From the formula for G(1,p) and this relation, the law of quadratic reciprocity follows:

$${\left({p\over q}\right)\left({q\over p}\right) = (-1)^{\frac{(p-1)(q-1)}{4}}.}$$

=== Theory in higher dimensions ===
The theory of the oscillator representation can be extended from R to R^{n} with the group SL(2,R) replaced by the symplectic group Sp(2n,R). The results can be proved either by straightforward generalisations from the one-dimensional case as in Folland (1989) or by using the fact that the n-dimensional case is a tensor product of n one-dimensional cases, reflecting the decomposition:

$$L^2({\mathbf R}^n)=L^2({\mathbf R})^{\otimes n}.$$

Let $\mathcal S$ be the space of Schwartz functions on R^{n}, a dense subspace of L^{2}(R^{n}). For s, t in R^{n}, define U(s) and V(t) on $\mathcal S$ and L^{2}(R) by

$$U(s)f(x)= f(x-s),\qquad V(t)f(tx)=e^{ix\cdot t} f(x).$$

From the definition U and V satisfy the Weyl commutation relation

$$U(s)V(t)=e^{-is\cdot t}V(t)U(s).$$

As before this is called the Schrödinger representation.

The Fourier transform is defined on $\mathcal S$ by

$${\widehat{f}(t)= {1\over (2\pi)^{n/2}} \int_{{\mathbf R}^n} f(x) e^{-ix\cdot t} \, dx.}$$

The Fourier inversion formula

$${f(x) ={1\over (2\pi)^{n/2}}\int_{{\mathbf R}^n} \widehat{f}(t)e^{ix\cdot t}\, dt}$$

shows that the Fourier transform is an isomorphism of $\mathcal S$ onto itself extending to a unitary mapping of L^{2}(R^{n}) onto itself (Plancherel's theorem).

The Stone–von Neumann theorem asserts that the Schrödinger representation is irreducible and is the unique irreducible representation of the commutation relations: any other representation is a direct sum of copies of this representation.

If U and V satisfying the Weyl commutation relations, define

$${ W(x,y)=e^{ix\cdot y/2}U(x)V(y).}$$

Then

$${W(x_1,y_1)W(x_2,y_2)=e^{i(x_1\cdot y_2-y_1\cdot x_2)} W(x_1+x_2,y_1+y_2),}$$

so that W defines a projective unitary representation of R^{2n} with cocycle given by

$$\omega(z_1,z_2) = e^{iB(z_1,z_2)},$$

where $z=x+iy=(x,y)$ and B is the symplectic form on R^{2n} given by

$$B(z_1,z_2)=x_1\cdot y_2-y_1\cdot x_2=\Im\, z_1\cdot\overline {z_2}.$$

The symplectic group Sp (2n,R) is defined to be group of automorphisms g of R^{2n} preserving the form B. It follows from the Stone–von Neumann theorem that for each such g there is a unitary π(g) on L^{2}(R) satisfying the covariance relation

$$\pi(g) W(z) \pi(g)^* = W(g(z)).$$

By Schur's lemma the unitary π(g) is unique up to multiplication by a scalar ζ with |ζ| = 1, so that π defines a projective unitary representation of Sp(n). Representatives can be chosen for π(g), unique up to a sign, which show that the 2-cocycle for the projective representation of Sp(2n,R) takes values ±1. In fact elements of the group Sp(n,R) are given by 2n × 2n real matrices g satisfying

$${gJg^t=J,}$$

where

$${J=\begin{pmatrix} 0 & -I \\ I & 0 \end{pmatrix}.}$$

Sp(2n,R) is generated by matrices of the form

$$g_1=\begin{pmatrix} A & 0 \\ 0 & (A^t)^{-1} \end{pmatrix},\,\, g_2=\begin{pmatrix} I & 0\\ B& I\end{pmatrix},\,\, g_3=\begin{pmatrix} 0 & I\\ -I & 0\end{pmatrix},$$

and the operators

$${\pi(g_1)f(x)=\pm \det (A)^{-\frac{1}{2}} f(A^{-1}x),\,\, \pi(g_2)f(x) =\pm e^{-ix^tBx} f(x),\,\, \pi(g_3)f(x)=\pm e^{in\pi/8} \widehat{f}(x)}$$

satisfy the covariance relations above. This gives an ordinary unitary representation of the metaplectic group, a double cover of Sp(2n,R). Indeed, Sp(n,R) acts by Möbius transformations on the generalised Siegel upper half plane H_{n} consisting of symmetric complex n × n matrices Z with strictly imaginary part by

$${gZ=(AZ+B)(CZ+D)^{-1}}$$

if

$${g=\begin{pmatrix} A & B \\ C & D\end{pmatrix}.}$$

The function

$${m(g,z)=\det (CZ+D)}$$

satisfies the 1-cocycle relation

$${m(gh,Z)=m(g,hZ)m(h,Z).}$$

The metaplectic group Mp(2n,R) is defined as the group

$${Mp(2,\mathbf R)=\{(g,G): \,G(Z)^2=m(g,Z)\}}$$

and is a connected double covering group of Sp(2n,R).

If $\Im Z > 0$, then it defines a coherent state

$${f_z(x) = e^{ix^tZx/2}}$$

in L^{2}, lying in a single orbit of Sp(2n) generated by

$${f_{iI}(x) = e^{-x\cdot x/2}.}$$

If g lies in Mp(2n,R) then

$${ \pi((g^t)^{-1})f_Z(x)= m(g,Z)^{-1/2}f_{gZ}(x)}$$

defines an ordinary unitary representation of the metaplectic group, from which it follows that the cocycle on Sp(2n,R) takes only values ±1.

Holomorphic Fock space is the Hilbert space $\mathcal{F}_n$ of holomorphic functions f(z) on C_{n} with finite norm

$${{1\over \pi^n} \int_{{\mathbf C}^n} |f(z)|^2 e^{-|z|^2} \, dx\cdot dy}$$

inner product

$${(f_1,f_2)= {1\over \pi^n} \int_{{\mathbf C}^n} f_1(z)\overline{f_2(z)} e^{-|z|^2} \, dx\cdot dy.}$$

and orthonormal basis

$${e_\alpha(z)={z^\alpha\over \sqrt{\alpha!}}}$$

for α a multinomial. For f in ${\mathcal F}_n$ and z in C^{n}, the operators

$${ W_{{\mathcal F}_n}(z)f(w)=e^{-|z|^2} e^{w\overline{z}} f(w-z).}$$

define an irreducible unitary representation of the Weyl commutation relations. By the Stone–von Neumann theorem there is a unitary operator $\mathcal U$ from L^{2}(R^{n}) onto $\mathcal{F}_n$ intertwining the two representations. It is given by the Bargmann transform

$${\mathcal{U}f(z) ={1\over (2\pi)^{n/2}}\int B(z,t) f(t)\, dt,}$$

where

$$B(z,t)= \exp [-z\cdot z -t\cdot t/2 +z\cdot t].$$

Its adjoint ${\mathcal U}^*$ is given by the formula:

$${\mathcal{U}^*F(t)={1\over \pi^n} \int_{{\mathbf C}^n} B(\overline{z},t) F(z)\, dx\cdot dy.}$$

Sobolev spaces, smooth and analytic vectors can be defined as in the one-dimensional case using the sum of n copies of the harmonic oscillator

$$\Delta_n=\sum_{i=1}^n -{\partial^2\over \partial x_i^2} + x_i^2.$$

The Weyl calculus similarly extends to the n-dimensional case.

The complexification Sp(2n,C) of the symplectic group is defined by the same relation, but allowing the matrices A, B, C and D to be complex. The subsemigroup of group elements that take the Siegel upper half plane into itself has a natural double cover. The representations of Mp(2n,R) on L^{2}(R^{n}) and $\mathcal{F}_n$ extend naturally to a representation of this semigroup by contraction operators defined by kernels, which generalise the one-dimensional case (taking determinants where necessary). The action of Mp(2n,R) on coherent states applies equally well to operators in this larger semigroup.

As in the 1-dimensional case, where the group SL(2,R) has a counterpart SU(1,1) through the Cayley transform with the upper half plane replaced by the unit disc, the symplectic group has a complex counterpart. Indeed, if C is the unitary matrix

$${C={1\over \sqrt{2}} \begin{pmatrix} I & i I \\ I & -iI \end{pmatrix}}$$

then C Sp(2n) C^{−1} is the group of all matrices

$${g=\begin{pmatrix} A & B \\ \overline{B} & \overline{A}\end{pmatrix}}$$

such that

$${AA^* - BB^*=I,\,\,\, AB^t=BA^t;}$$

or equivalently

$$gKg^*=K,$$

where

$${K=\begin{pmatrix} I & 0 \\ 0 & -I \end{pmatrix}.}$$

The Siegel generalized disk D_{n} is defined as the set of complex symmetric n x n matrices W with operator norm less than 1.

It consist precisely of Cayley transforms of points Z in the Siegel generalized upper half plane:

$${W=(Z-iI)(Z+iI)^{-1}.}$$

Elements g act on D_{n}

$${gW=(AW+B)(\overline{B}W +\overline{A})^{-1}}$$

and, as in the one dimensional case this action is transitive. The stabilizer subgroup of 0 consists of matrices with A unitary and B = 0.

For W in D_{n} the metaplectic coherent states in holomorphic Fock space are defined by

$${f_W(z)=e^{z^tWz/2}.}$$

The inner product of two such states is given by

$${(f_{W_1},f_{W_2})=\det (1-W_1\overline{W_2})^{-1/2}.}$$

Moreover, the metaplectic representation π satisfies

$${\pi(g)f_W= \det (\overline{A} +\overline{B}W)^{-1/2} f_{gW}.}$$

The closed linear span of these states gives the even part of holomorphic Fock space $\mathcal{F}_n^+$. The embedding of Sp(2n) in Sp(2(n+1)) and the compatible identification

$$\mathcal{F}_{n+1}^+ = \mathcal{F}_n^+ \oplus \mathcal{F}_n^-$$

lead to an action on the whole of $\mathcal{F}_n$. It can be verified directly that it is compatible with the action of the operators W(z).

Since the complex semigroup has as Shilov boundary the symplectic group, the fact that this representation has a well-defined contractive extension to the semigroup follows from the maximum modulus principle and the fact that the semigroup operators are closed under adjoints. Indeed, it suffices to check, for two such operators S, T and vectors v_{i} proportional to metaplectic coherent states, that

$$\left|\sum_{i,j}(STv_i,v_j)\right| \le \|\sum_i v_i\|^2,$$

which follows because the sum depends holomorphically on S and T, which are unitary on the boundary.

=== Index theorems for Toeplitz operators ===
Let S denote the unit sphere in C^{n} and define the Hardy space H^{2}(S) be the closure in L^{2}(S) of the restriction of polynomials in the coordinates z_{1}, ..., z_{n}. Let P be the projection onto Hardy space. It is known that if m(f) denotes multiplication by a continuous function f on S, then the commutator [P,m(f)] is compact. Consequently, defining the Toeplitz operator by

$${T(f)=Pm(f)P}$$

on Hardy space, it follows that T(fg) – T(f)T(g) is compact for continuous f and g. The same holds if f and g are matrix-valued functions (so that the corresponding Toeplitz operators are matrices of operators on H^{2}(S)). In particular if f is a function on S taking values in invertible matrices, then

$${T(f)T(f^{-1}) -I,\qquad T(f^{-1})T(f) -I}$$

are compact and hence T(f) is a Fredholm operator with an index defined as

$$\operatorname{ind} T(f)= \dim \ker T(f) - \dim \ker T(f)^*.$$

The index has been computed using the methods of K-theory by Coburn (1973) and coincides up to a sign with the degree of f as a continuous mapping from S into the general linear group.

Helton & Howe (1975) gave an analytic way to establish this index theorem, simplied later by Howe. Their proof relies on the fact if f is smooth then the index is given by the formula of McKean and Singer:

$$\operatorname{ind} T(f) = \operatorname{Tr} (I-T(f^{-1})T(f))^n - \operatorname{Tr} (I-T(f)T(f^{-1}))^n.$$

Howe (1980) noticed that there was a natural unitary isomorphism between H^{2}(S) and L^{2}(R^{n}) carrying the Toeplitz operators

$${T_j=T(z_j)}$$

onto the operators

$${(P_j+iQ_j)\Delta^{-1/2}.}$$

These are examples of zeroth order operators constructed within the Weyl calculus. The traces in the McKean-Singer formula can be computed directly using the Weyl calculus, leading to another proof of the index theorem. This method of proving index theorems was generalised by Alain Connes within the framework of cyclic cohomology.

=== Theory in infinite dimensions ===
The theory of the oscillator representation in infinite dimensions is due to Irving Segal and David Shale. Graeme Segal used it to give a mathematically rigorous construction of projective representations of loop groups and the group of diffeomorphisms of the circle. At an infinitesimal level the construction of the representations of the Lie algebras, in this case the affine Kac–Moody algebra and the Virasoro algebra, was already known to physicists, through dual resonance theory and later string theory. Only the simplest case will be considered here, involving the loop group LU(1) of smooth maps of the circle into U(1) = T. The oscillator semigroup, developed independently by Neretin and Segal, allows contraction operators to be defined for the semigroup of univalent holomorphic maps of the unit disc into itself, extending the unitary operators corresponding to diffeomorphisms of the circle. When applied to the subgroup SU(1,1) of the diffeomorphism group, this gives a generalization of the oscillator representation on L^{2}(R) and its extension to the Olshanskii semigroup.

The representation of commutation on Fock space is generalized to infinite dimensions by replacing C^{n} (or its dual space) by an arbitrary complex Hilbert space H. The symmetric group S_{k} acts on H^{⊗k}. S^{k}(H) is defined to be the fixed point subspace of S_{k} and the symmetric algebra is the algebraic direct sum

$${\bigoplus_{k\ge 0} S^k(H).}$$

It has a natural inner product inherited from H^{⊗k}:

$${(x_1\otimes \cdots \otimes x_k,y_1\otimes \cdots \otimes y_k) =k!\cdot \prod_{i=1}^k (x_i,y_i).}$$

Taking the components S^{k}(H) to be mutually orthogonal, the symmetric Fock space S(H) is defined to be the Hilbert space completion of this direct sum.

For ξ in H define the coherent state e^{ξ} by

$${e^\xi=\sum_{k\ge 0} (k!)^{-1} \xi^{\otimes k}.}$$

It follows that their linear span is dense in S(H), that the coherent states corresponding to n distinct vectors are linearly independent and that

$${(e^\xi,e^\eta)=e^{(\xi,\eta)}.}$$

When H is finite-dimensional, S(H) can naturally be identified with holomorphic Fock space for H*, since in the standard way S^{k}(H) are just homogeneous polynomials of degree k on H* and the inner products match up. Moreover, S(H) has functorial properties. Most importantly

$$S(H_1\oplus H_2)=S(H_1)\otimes S(H_2),\qquad e^{x_1\oplus x_2}=e^{x_1}\otimes e^{x_2}.$$

A similar result hold for finite orthogonal direct sums and extends to infinite orthogonal direct sums, using von Neumman's definition of the infinite tensor product with 1 the reference unit vector in S^{0}(H_{i}). Any contraction operator between Hilbert spaces induces a contraction operator between the corresponding symmetric Fock spaces in a functorial way.

A unitary operator on S(H) is uniquely determined by it values on coherent states. Moreover, for any assignment v_{ξ} such that

$${(v_\xi,v_\eta) = e^{(\xi,\eta)}}$$

there is a unique unitary operator U on S(H) such that

$${v_\xi= U(e^\xi).}$$

As in the finite-dimensional case, this allows the unitary operators W(x) to be defined for x in H:

$${W(x)e^{y} = e^{-\|x\|^2/2} e^{-(x,y)} e^{x+y}.}$$

It follows immediately from the finite-dimensional case that these operators are unitary and satisfy

$${W(x)W(y)=e^{-{i\over 2} \Im (x,y)} W(x+y).}$$

In particular the Weyl commutation relations are satisfied:

$${W(x)W(y)=e^{-i \Im (x,y)}W(y)W(x).}$$

Taking an orthonormal basis e_{n} of H, S(H) can be written as an infinite tensor product of the S(C e_{n}). The irreducibility of W on each of these spaces implies the irreducibility of W on the whole of S(H). W is called the complex wave representation.

To define the symplectic group in infinite dimensions let H_{R} be the underlying real vector space of H with the symplectic form

$${B(x,y) =-\Im (x,y)}$$

and real inner product

$${(x,y)_{\mathbf{R}} =\Re (x,y).}$$

The complex structure is then defined by the orthogonal operator

$${J(x)=ix}$$

so that

$${B(x,y)=-(Jx,y)_{\mathbf{R}}.}$$

A bounded invertible operator real linear operator T on H_{R} lies in the symplectic group if it and its inverse preserve B. This is equivalent to the conditions:

$${TJT^t=J=T^t JT.}$$

The operator T is said to be implementable on S(H) provided there is a unitary π(T) such that

$$\pi(T) W(x) \pi(T)^*= W(Tx).$$

The implementable operators form a subgroup of the symplectic group, the restricted symplectic group. By Schur's lemma, π(T) is uniquely determined up to a scalar in T, so π gives a projective unitary representation of this subgroup.

The Segal-Shale quantization criterion states that T is implementable, i.e. lies in the restricted symplectic group, if and only if the commutator TJ – JT is a Hilbert–Schmidt operator.

Unlike the finite-dimensional case where a lifting π could be chosen so that it was multiplicative up to a sign, this is not possible in the infinite-dimensional case. (This can be seen directly using the example of the projective representation of the diffeomorphism group of the circle constructed below.)

The projective representation of the restricted symplectic group can be constructed directly on coherent states as in the finite-dimensional case.

In fact, choosing a real Hilbert subspace of H of which H is a complexification, for any operator T on H a complex conjugate of T is also defined. Then the infinite-dimensional analogue of SU(1,1) consists of invertible bounded operators

$${g=\begin{pmatrix} A & B\\ \overline{B} &\overline{A}\end{pmatrix}}$$

satisfying gKg* = K (or equivalently the same relations as in the finite-dimensional case). These belong to the restricted symplectic group if and only if B is a Hilbert–Schmidt operator. This group acts transitively on the infinite-dimensional analogue D_{≈} of the Seigel generalized unit disk consisting of Hilbert–Schmidt operators W that are symmetric with operator norm less than 1 via the formula

$${gZ=(AW+B)(\overline{B}W+\overline{A})^{-1}.}$$

Again the stabilizer subgroup of 0 consists of g with A unitary and B = 0. The metaplectic coherent states f_{W} can be defined as before and their inner product is given by the same formula, using the Fredholm determinant:

$${(f_{W_1},f_{W_2})=\det (I-W_2^*W_1)^{-\frac{1}{2}}.}$$

Define unit vectors by

$${e_W=\det (I-W^*W)^{1/4} f_W}$$

and set

$${\pi(g)e_W= \mu(\det(I+\overline{A}^{-1} \overline{B}W)^{-\frac{1}{2}}) e_{gW},}$$

where μ(ζ) = ζ/|ζ|. As before this defines a projective representation and, if g_{3} = g_{1}g_{2}, the cocycle is given by

$${\omega(g_1,g_2)=\mu[\det (A_3(A_1A_2)^{-1})^{-\frac{1}{2}}].}$$

This representation extends by analytic continuation to define contraction operators for the complex semigroup by the same analytic continuation argument as in the finite-dimensional case. It can also be shown that they are strict contractions.

Example Let H_{R} be the real Hilbert space consisting of real-valued functions on the circle with mean 0

$$f(\theta)=\sum_{n\ne 0} a_n e^{in\theta}$$

and for which

$${\sum_{n\ne 0} |n||a_n|^2 < \infty.}$$

The inner product is given by

$$\left (\sum a_n e^{in\theta}, \sum b_m e^{im\theta} \right )=\sum_{n\ne 0} |n| a_n\overline{b_n}.$$

An orthogonal basis is given by the function sin(nθ) and cos(nθ) for n > 0. The Hilbert transform on the circle defined by

$$J\sin (n\theta) = \cos(n\theta),\qquad J \cos (n\theta) =-\sin(n\theta)$$

defines a complex structure on H_{R}. J can also be written

$$J\sum_{n\ne 0} a_ne^{in\theta} =\sum_{n\ne 0} i \operatorname{sign}(n) a_n e^{in\theta},$$

where sign n = ±1 denotes the sign of n. The corresponding symplectic form is proportional to

$$B(f,g)=\int_{S^1} f dg.$$

In particular if φ is an orientation-preserving diffeomorphism of the circle and

$${T_\varphi f(\theta)= f(\varphi^{-1}(\theta)) -{1\over 2\pi}\int_0^{2\pi} f(\varphi^{-1}(\theta))\, d\theta ,}$$

then T_{φ} is implementable.

The operators W(f) with f smooth correspond to a subgroup of the loop group LT invariant under the diffeomorphism group of the circle. The infinitesimal operators corresponding to the vector fields

$${L_n=-\pi\left(i e^{in\theta}{d\over d\theta}\right)}$$

can be computed explicitly. They satisfy the Virasoro relations

$${[L_m,L_n]=(m-n)L_{m+n} + {m^3-m\over 12} \delta_{m+n,0}.}$$

In particular they cannor be adjusted by addition of scalar operators to remove the second term on the right hand side. This shows that the cocycle on the restricted symplectic group is not equivalent to one taking only the values ±1.

== See also ==
- Metaplectic group
- Invariant convex cone
