= Shamos =

Shamos is a surname. Notable people with the surname include:

- Michael Ian Shamos (born 1947), American mathematician
- Jeremy Shamos (born 1970), American actor

== See also ==
- Shames (surname)
