= Shail =

Shail may refer to:

== People ==
- Gary Shail (born 1959), English actor, director, producer and musician
- Mark Shail (born 1966), English football player
- Shail Chaturvedi (1936–2007), Indian author
- Shail Hada (born 1975), Indian singer
- Shail Upadhya (1935–2013), Nepalese diplomat

== Places ==
- Shri Shail, India

== See also ==
- Shale (disambiguation)
