= Battle of Pantina =

12th-century battle of the Byzantine–Serbian Wars

Coordinates: 42°54′N 20°50′E

- Part of Byzantine–Serbian wars
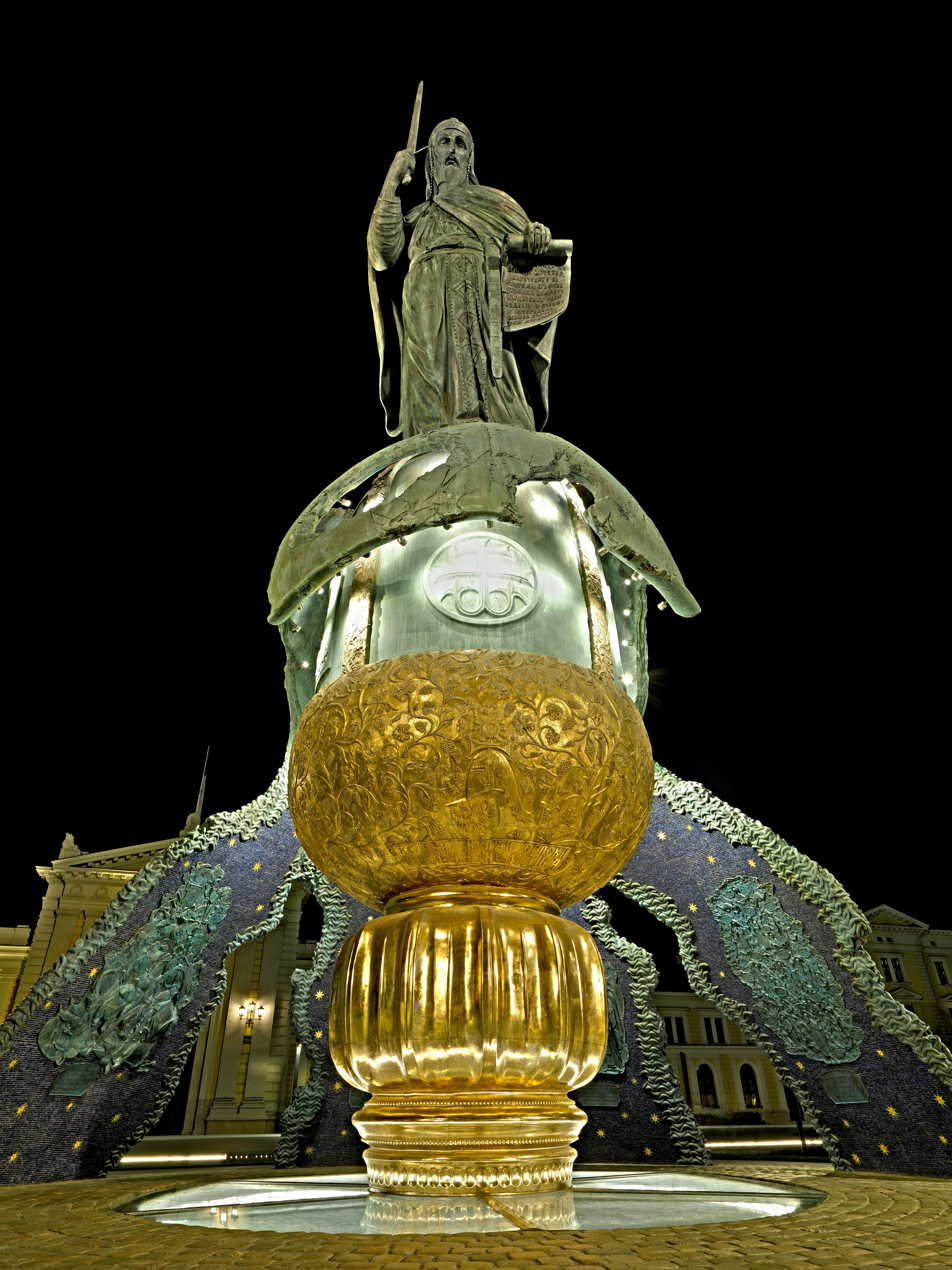
- Modern monument of Stefan Nemanja
| Date | 1166/1167 |
| Location | Pantina, near Zvečan |
| Result | Stefan Nemanja victory |

Belligerents
| Stefan Nemanja (coup) | Tihomir † (deposed); Supported by: Byzantine Empire |

Strength
| 10,000 | 30,000 |

Casualties and losses
| Low | High |

The Battle of Pantina was fought between the Byzantine Empire and the Grand Principality of Serbia in 1167. It was part of a war of succession within Serbia, in which the Byzantines intervened on behalf of the deposed Grand Prince Tihomir of Serbia against his rebellious younger brother, Prince Nemanja, who emerged victorious and was crowned afterwards.

== Background ==
Prince Nemanja of Ibar, Toplica, Rasina and Reke was the inferior of his lord and older brother, Grand Prince Tihomir of Serbia. When Nemanja had built monasteries without consulting Tihomir, the latter had Nemanja captured and chained, and his lands seized as well. But Nemanja's supporters within the clergy, who had welcomed his construction of churches and thus granted him their respect, conspired to have him released. Nemanja was later freed, and regained rule in some of his previous lands. Next, he successfully overthrew Tihomir, who fled to the Byzantines with his brothers.

== Battle ==
A Byzantine army was assembled for the Byzantine ally Tihomir, who came in from Skopje. Although it is unknown whether they served as mercenaries or auxiliary troops, many foreigners including Greeks, Franks and Turks formed part of the forces loyal to Tihomir. The two armies collided at Pantina near Zvečan, present-day Kosovo. After a decisive battle, the Byzantine force was crushed and quickly began retreating. Tihomir drowned in the Sitnica river and Nemanja's remaining brothers were pardoned, recognising Stefan Nemanja as the supreme ruler of Serbia, crowned as "Ruler of All Serbia".

== Aftermath ==
The battle was decisive in the fact that it ensured the unity of all Serbian princes and their ultimate loyalty to Stefan Nemanja. This later paved the way for the consolidation of Serbia and its eventual formation into a kingdom.
