= Shales (surname) =

Shales is a surname. Notable people with the surname include:

- Brian Shales (born 1985), Canadian pair skater
- Tom Shales (1944–2024), American writer and critic

== See also ==
- Scales (surname)
- Shale (surname)
- Shames (surname)
