= Çyçavica =

Mountain in Kosovo

Coordinates: 42.738061°N 20.932939°E

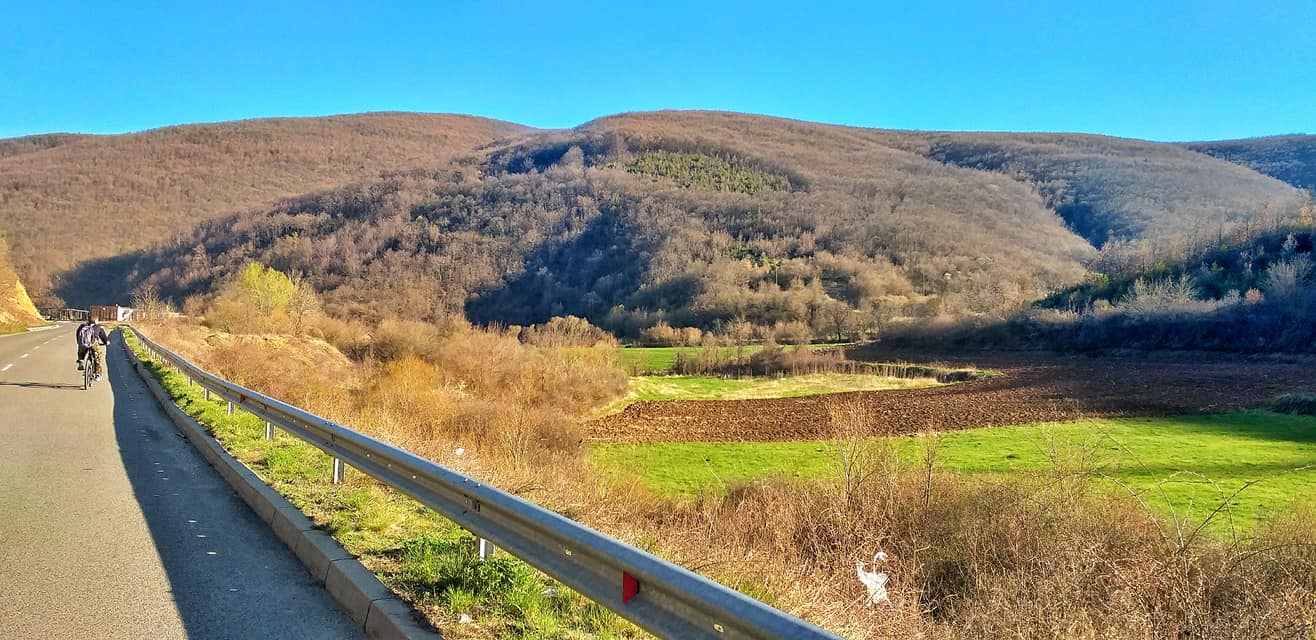
Picture taken from the Artakoll i Çyçavices

Çyçavica or Čičavica is a mountain situated at the center of Kosovo with a length of about 8 km (5 mi) and a width of about 5 km (3 mi). Its highest peak reaches a height of 1,091 m (3,579 ft). It is in the boundary line between the Kosovo Plain, the Drenica and the Artakolli i Çyçavicës region. The river Sitnica passes by it. The villages of Oshlan and Akrashticë are located to the right of the mountain. Large towns and cities like Skenderaj, Vushtrri and Drenas are located close by the mountain.

== Etymology ==
The name is inherited from the ancient legend of the Çyçja.

According to the legend, Muja and Halil got their well-known strength in Çyçavica after drinking milk from Zana's breast and then comparing their new strength in the form of throwing stones.

== History ==
During the Kaçak movement, Çyçavica was fully inhabited by Albanians who, under the leadership of Azem Galica, took up arms against the Kingdom of Yugoslavia. During the Second World War under the leadership of Shaban Polluzha, Çyçavica was a stronghold of the Balli Kombëtar. During the 1998-1999 Kosovo War, Çyçavica was heavily used by the UÇK, which used its strategic location to fight against the Serbian Armed Forces. On September 22 and 23, 1998, a battle took place in the region. In those days, over 25,000 Serbian soldiers and police surrounded Çyçavica and launched an attack along all the roads, which converged at a single point, at its peak, a bare meadow, from where almost all of Kosovo could be seen. Many villagers took refuge in the mountain until the war ended.

Nowadays, Serbian colonists who were sent by the Kingdom of Yugoslavia have left the mountain turning Çyçavica into a homogenous place inhabited by Albanians once again.

== Notable people ==
- Adem Jashari, Father of KLA
- Bekim Shyti, UÇK commander
- Aziz Zhilivoda, Ballist
- Adnan Shyti, UÇK soldier
- Qazim Morina, Ballist
- Enver Zymberi, Police officer
- Hamit Saraçi, Kachak
- Ferat Hashim Hasani, Ballist
- Rrahman Rama, Commander of Kosovo Security Force
- Tahir Meha, Albanian Political Activist and Patriot.
- Azem Galica, Kachak Leader
- Shote Galica, Albanian insurgent
- Hasan Prishtina, Rilindas
- Ahmet Delia, Albanian patriot
- Mehmet Gradica, Ballist, Vullnetari and Albanian nationalist
- Emin Lati, Kachak
- Sami Lushtaku, UÇK Soldier and former mayor of Skenderaj
- Zejnullah Begu, wealthiest person east of Çyçavica.
- Fehmi Lladrovci, UÇK commander
- Xhevë Lladrovci, UÇK soldier
- Hysen Bojku, Ballist
