= Shames (surname) =

Shames is a Yiddish surname, derived from Yiddish shames, "sexton (in a synagogue), gabbai". Notable people with the surname include:

- Edward Shames (1922–2021), American army officer
- Laurence Shames (born 1951), American writer
- Stephen Shames (born 1947), American photojournalist

== See also ==
- Shamos (surname)
