= Pantina =

Pantina: Pantinë (Albanian); Пантина/Pantina (Serbian)
- Village
- Location within Kosovo
- Location: Kosovo
- District: Mitrovicë
- Municipality: Vushtrri
- Elevation: 521 m (1,709 ft)

Population (2011)
  - Total: 1,114
- Time zone: UTC+1 (CET)
  - Summer (DST): UTC+2 (CEST)

Pantina (Serbian Cyrillic: Пантина) is a settlement in the Vushtrri municipality in the Republic of Kosovo. The rural settlement lies on a cadastral area with the same name, with 484 hectares. It lies 521 m above sea level. It has an ethnic Albanian majority, and Serbian minority; in the 1991 census, it had 1855 inhabitants.

It lies to the west of the Sitnica river.

== History ==
The village is mentioned for the first time as the site of the Battle of Pantino in 1167, when Serbian Prince Stefan Nemanja defeated his older brother, and Byzantine ally, Grand Prince Tihomir (r. 1166), and was crowned Grand Prince of Serbia, beginning the reign of the Nemanjić dynasty. In a charter of Emperor Stephen Dušan dating to 1334, the village was granted (metochion) to the Saint Archangels Monastery, the Emperor's foundation, in Prizren.

In an Ottoman defter (tax register) of 1455, it was a village with 55 houses. The village is part of the ecclesiastical jurisdiction of the Serbian Orthodox Eparchy of Raška and Prizren.

Demographic history
| Ethnic group | 1948 | 1953 | 1961 | 1971 | 1981 | 1991 |
|---|---|---|---|---|---|---|
| Albanians | | | | | 1567 | |
| Serbs | | | | | 134 | |
| Total | 866 | 936 | 1086 | 1364 | 1701 | 1855 |
