= Dennis Shale =

Dennis Shale

Dennis John Shale, FCRP (19 February 1948 - 18 May 2017) was emeritus professor of respiratory medicine at Llandough Hospital in Cardiff, Wales. He was a fellow of the Royal College of Physicians and held the David Davies chair of respiratory and communicable diseases at the University of Wales College of Medicine.
