= Shalë, Vushtrri =

Shalë: Shalë (Albanian); Шалце/Salce (Serbian)
- Village
- Location in Kosovo
- Coordinates: 42°45′25″N 20°56′51″E
- Location: Kosovo
- District: Mitrovicë
- Municipality: Vushtrri

Population (2011)
  - Total: 541
- Time zone: UTC+1 (CET)
  - Summer (DST): UTC+2 (CEST)

Shalë (Albanian: or Shala; Serbian: Шалце, Salce) is a settlement in the municipality of Vushtrri, District of Mitrovica, Kosovo.

== See also ==
- Vushtrri
