= David Shale =

New Zealand-American mathematician

David Winston Howard Shale (22 March 1932, New Zealand – 7 January 2016) was a New Zealand-American mathematician, specializing in the mathematical foundations of quantum physics. He is known as one of the namesakes of the Segal–Shale-Weil representation.

After secondary and undergraduate education in New Zealand, Shale became a graduate student in mathematics at the University of Chicago and received his Ph.D. there in 1960. His thesis On certain groups of operators on Hilbert space was written under the supervision of Irving Segal. Shale became an assistant professor at the University of California, Berkeley and then became in 1964 a professor at the University of Pennsylvania, where he continued teaching until his retirement.

He was an expert in the mathematical foundations of Quantum Physics with many very original ideas on the subject. In addition, he discovered what is now called the Shale-Weil Representation in operator theory. He was also an expert in Bayesian Probability Theory, especially as it applied to Physics.

According to Irving Segal:

... although contrary to common intuitive belief, Lorentz-invariance in itself is materially insufficient to characterize the vacuum for any free field (this remarkable fact is due to David Shale; it should perhaps be emphasized that this lack of uniqueness holds even in such a simple case as the conventional scalar meson field ...), none of the Lorentz-invariant states other than the conventional vacuum is consistent with the postulate of the positivity of the energy, when suitably and simply formulated.

== Selected publications ==
- Shale, David (1962). "Linear Symmetries of Free Boson Fields". Transactions of the American Mathematical Society. 103 (1): 149–167. doi:10.2307/1993745. JSTOR 1993745.
- Shale, David (1962). "A Note on the Scattering of Boson Fields". Journal of Mathematical Physics. 3 (5): 915–921. Bibcode:1962JMP.....3..915S. doi:10.1063/1.1724306.
- Shale, David; Stinespring, W. Forrest (1964). "States of the Clifford Algebra". The Annals of Mathematics. 80 (2): 365. doi:10.2307/1970397. JSTOR 1970397.
- Shale, David; Stinespring, W. Forrest (1965). "Spinor Representations of Infinite Orthogonal Groups". Journal of Mathematics and Mechanics. 14 (2): 315–322. JSTOR 24901279.
- Shale, David (1966). "Invariant Integration over the Infinite Dimensional Orthogonal Group and Related Spaces". Transactions of the American Mathematical Society. 124 (1): 148–157. doi:10.2307/1994441. JSTOR 1994441.
- Shale, David; Stinespring, W. Forrest (1966). "Integration over Non-Euclidean Geometries of Infinite Dimension". Journal of Mathematics and Mechanics. 16 (2): 135–146. JSTOR 24901475.
- Shale, David; Stinespring, W. Forrest (1966). "Continuously splittable distributions in Hilbert space". Illinois Journal of Mathematics. 10 (4): 574–578. doi:10.1215/ijm/1256054896. ISSN 0019-2082.
- Shale, David; Stinespring, W. Forrest (1967). "The quantum harmonic oscillator with hyperbolic phase space" (PDF). Journal of Functional Analysis. 1 (4): 492–502. doi:10.1016/0022-1236(67)90013-4. Archived from the original (PDF) on 2019-03-24.
- Shale, David; Stinespring, W. Forrest (1968). "Wiener processes" (PDF). Journal of Functional Analysis. 2 (4): 378–394. doi:10.1016/0022-1236(68)90002-5. Archived from the original (PDF) on 2019-04-15.
- Shale, David; Stinespring, W. Forrest (1970). "Wiener processes II" (PDF). Journal of Functional Analysis. 5 (3): 334–353. doi:10.1016/0022-1236(70)90013-3.
- Shale, David (1973). "Absolute continuity of Wiener processes". Journal of Functional Analysis. 12 (3): 321–334. doi:10.1016/0022-1236(73)90083-9.
- Shale, David (1974). "Analysis over Discrete spaces". Journal of Functional Analysis. 16 (3): 258–288. doi:10.1016/0022-1236(74)90074-3.
- Shale, David (1979). "On geometric ideas which lie at the foundation of quantum theory". Advances in Mathematics. 32 (3): 175–203. doi:10.1016/0001-8708(79)90041-0.
- Shale, David (1979). "Random functions of Poisson type". Journal of Functional Analysis. 33: 1–35. doi:10.1016/0022-1236(79)90015-6.
- Shale, David (1982). "Discrete quantum theory". Foundations of Physics. 12 (7): 661–687. Bibcode:1982FoPh...12..661S. doi:10.1007/BF00729805. S2CID 119764527.
