= Emin Xhinovci =

Kosovar guerrilla and Hitler impersonator

- Born: c. 1959 (age 66–67); Kosovska Mitrovica, Socialist Autonomous Province of Kosovo, SFR Yugoslavia
- Military career
- Allegiance: Kosova
- Branch: Kosovo Liberation Army
- Service years: 1998–99
- Nicknames: Hitler; Adolf Hitler Kosova
- Conflicts: Kosovo War (WIA)

Emin Xhinovci (also spelled Gjinovci, Djinovci and Džinovci; born c. 1959) is a retired Kosovo Liberation Army (KLA) insurgent and restaurant owner from Mitrovica known for his striking resemblance to Nazi leader Adolf Hitler.

He immigrated to Germany in 1993 and settled in Düsseldorf, where he started an import-export business. In 1997, he returned to Kosovo and later joined the KLA with the intention of helping separate the region from Yugoslavia. During his time as a guerrilla, he came to be known by the nickname "Hitler" because of his likeness to the Nazi leader. Following the Kosovo War, he settled in Mitrovica and opened a string of Nazi-themed restaurants that angered some NATO peacekeepers and were quickly closed. Xhinovci resorted to portraying the Nazi leader full-time in his public life, posing for pictures with locals, peacekeepers and tourists and charging between €20-80 per photograph. He is well known throughout Mitrovica, and his five daughters are referred to by locals as "Hitler's children". Xhinovci always carries a copy of Hitler's autobiographical manifesto Mein Kampf with him and is frequently paid to attend events such as weddings and funerals. He is the subject of a short documentary film directed by independent filmmaker Alban Muja, titled Germans Are a Bit Scared of Me.

== Early life, emigration and guerrilla activity ==
A Kosovo Albanian, Emin Xhinovci was born in Kosovska Mitrovica in 1959, in what was then Yugoslavia. In 1993, he moved to the German city of Düsseldorf, where he started an import-export business. He left Germany in 1997 and returned to Kosovo to "fight for the motherland" as tensions between Albanians and Serbs increased.

Xhinovci joined the Kosovo Liberation Army (Albanian: Ushtria Çlirimtare e Kosovës; or KLA) in 1998, and fought against the Serb-dominated Yugoslav Army (Serbian: Vojska Jugoslavije) with the goal of separating Kosovo from Yugoslavia. Xhinovci earned the reputation of a "fierce fighter" and commanded the respect of local Albanians. His comrades gave him the nickname "Hitler" due to his uncanny resemblance to Nazi leader Adolf Hitler. Xhinovci told journalist Una Hajdari: "People have called me Hitler since my army days. They say I look a lot like him—unlike the English guy who plays him in that movie," apparently a reference to Charlie Chaplin's role in The Great Dictator.

Serbian police documents from 1998 indicate that he was suspected of participating in the kidnapping and execution of nine Serb mineworkers at the Belaćevac coal mine, near Obiliq. In 1999, Xhinovci was wounded in battle and airlifted to Germany for treatment. While in hospital, he grew a toothbrush moustache which attracted the attention of hospital staff.

== Controversy ==
=== Nazi-themed restaurants and bars ===
Following his experience with the German hospital staff, Xhinovci realized that he could capitalize on his resemblance to Hitler. He went to great lengths to enhance his physical likeness to the Nazi leader—regularly clipping his moustache, dying his hair jet black and imitating Hitler's signature hairstyle. When the war in Kosovo ended, Xhinovci returned to Mitrovica and opened a bar called Bar Hit and Jet, known affectionately among Kosovo Albanians as Pizzeria Hitleri ("Hitler's Pizzeria"). The establishment proved controversial among western peacekeepers who had occupied Kosovo following the withdrawal of Yugoslav security forces in June 1999. In one instance, French NATO troops took down a sign carrying a swastika from the entrance to Xhinovci's bar, much to his displeasure. One French commander told reporters that he was disgusted with Xhinovci's actions and said that his troops were forbidden from entering the bar, which juxtaposed Nazi imagery with portraits of Xhinovci in KLA uniform. Asked why he enjoyed dressing up as Hitler, Xhinovci responded: "Everyone who is against the people who carried out bloodshed against [Albanians] is a friend of mine", apparently referring to the German-led Axis occupation of Yugoslavia, when German forces turned a blind eye to Albanian raids on Serb-populated areas of Kosovo. He conceded that Hitler had gone "too far" by killing women and children, but said that it would be "a good idea to eliminate all those who thirst for our blood".

Within several years, Xhinovci was forced to close Pizzeria Hitleri because local KLA commanders felt that it would tarnish the organization's image. Like many in post-war Kosovo, he encountered great financial difficulties and relied on his KLA service pension and financial assistance from relatives in Western Europe. Once his financial situation stabilized, Xhinovci opened a restaurant and named it Jehona after his oldest daughter. All of the restaurant's receipts were stamped with a black swastika in the upper left corner. The restaurant closed a few years after its opening for reasons unknown.

=== Hitler impersonator ===
"I am proud of how I look, and I have no intention of changing my appearance until the day I die. This is what people will remember me by."

— Emin Xhinovci

Following the closure of Pizzeria Hitleri and Jehona, Xhinovci has resorted to walking around Mitrovica dressed as Hitler and posing for pictures with locals, tourists and NATO peacekeepers, charging between €20-80 per photograph. Some days, he earns as much as €200 posing as Hitler. Besides posing for photographs, Xhinovci attends various events, including weddings and funerals, and greets attendees with a Nazi salute. "[This] sometimes has an undesirable effect because people who've come to pay their respects to the deceased often wish to speak with me and take pictures," Xhinovci explains.

Xhinovci carries numerous pieces of Nazi paraphernalia around with him, including Nazi-era Reichsmarks, swastika-emblazoned buttons, scarves embroidered with swastikas and other Nazi imagery, as well as a copy of Mein Kampf. He has business cards featuring a swastika and the word "Hitler" printed in bold. Locals and peacekeepers alike do not seem to mind Xhinovci's Hitler impersonations. On the contrary, many passersby—including some NATO peacekeepers—stop and greet him with the Nazi salute. One local told Vice News: "I have a lot of other things to worry about in my life. I might look at him if he walks by, but that's it." Locals apparently believe that his way of earning a living "shows great enterprise". "People respect me," Xhinovci explains. "The young and old [...] men, women and children. Everyone greets me with "Heil Hitler". Xhinovci's five daughters, referred to locally as "Hitler's children", are not bothered by their father's Hitler impersonations. Xhinovci reportedly attends parent-teacher conferences dressed as Hitler and says that teachers and other parents do not mind his appearance. He says that every time he goes to pick his daughters up from school he is surrounded by children who want to talk with him and take pictures. "Girls like to touch my face. They think it's a mask. They pull my hair and ask if they can kiss me on the face. When I'm out of the house with my family, people stop to talk to me. But my wife is not a jealous person—she doesn't mind."

Xhinovci is unable to return to Germany because of his appearance, as the country has a series of laws which prohibit Nazi symbols, uniforms, slogans and forms of greeting. He has expressed a great dislike of Serbs, and says that he would have to carry a concealed handgun every time he wished to visit the Serb-held section of Mitrovica. Xhinovci says that he is greatly disappointed with post-war Kosovo, as he believed that reconciliation between Albanians and Serbs would have occurred after the conflict. When asked if it was difficult to portray Hitler, Xhinovci responded: "It is easy. I find myself in Hitler's character because he fought against my enemy. The enemy of my enemy is my friend. Yes, Serbs are my enemies." About his physical similarity to Hitler, he says: "I am not a dictator like him, but it is of great financial benefit that I resemble him."

Xhinovci is a controversial figure in some Kosovar circles. Kosova Aktuell, a Pristina-based German-language newspaper, called his actions "scandalous and unacceptable".

== In popular culture ==
In 2013, Kosovar filmmaker Alban Muja created a short documentary film about Xhinovci titled Germans Are a Bit Scared of Me, which chronicles Xhinovci's everyday activities and follows him around Mitrovica as he interacts with locals.

== See also ==
- Adolf Hitler in popular culture
