= Miraš open-cast coal mine =

Depleted open-cast coal mine in Kosovo

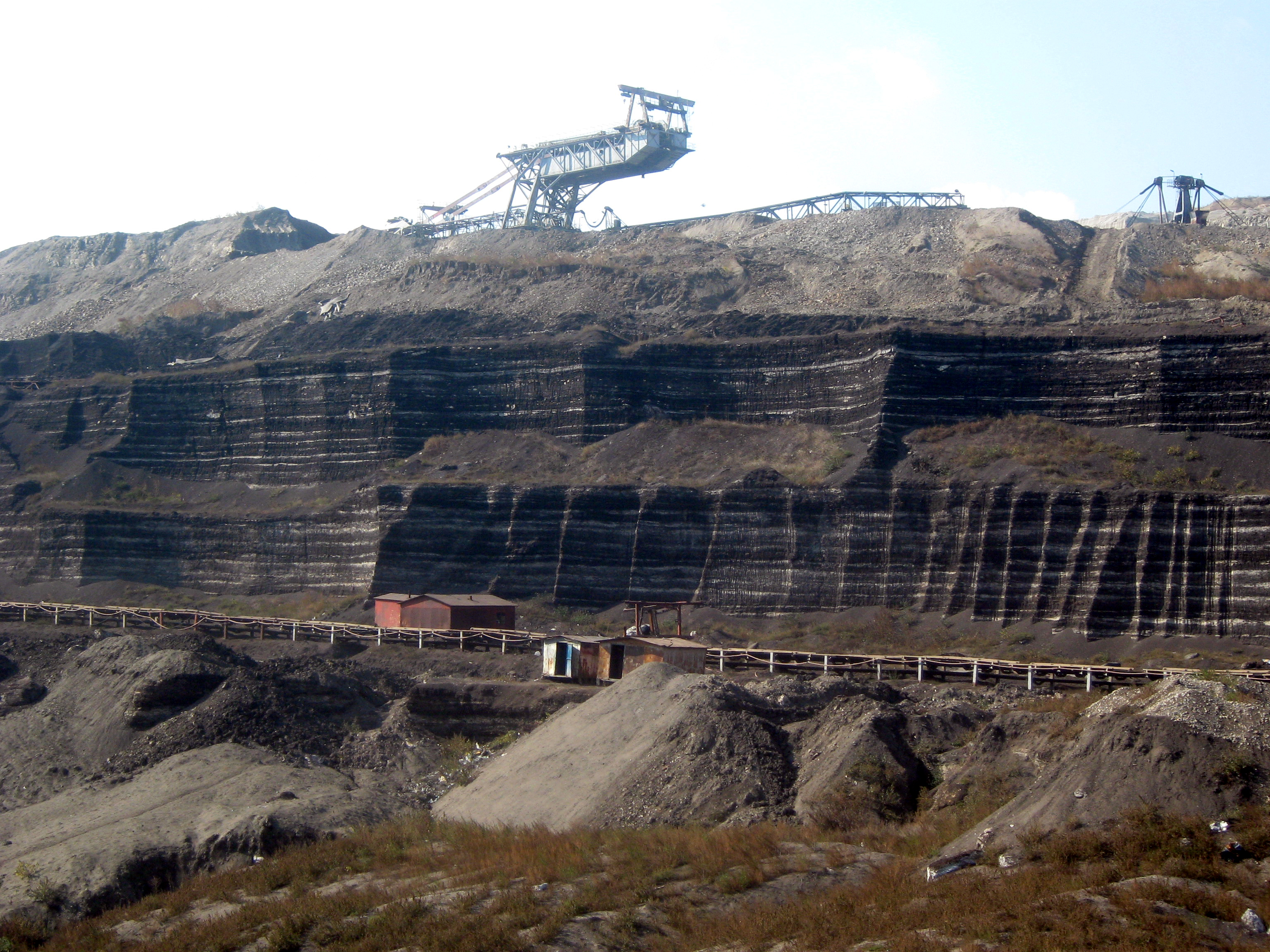
- View on Miraš coal mine

- Location within Kosovo
- Location: Obiliq, District of Pristina, Kosovo; 42°40′01″N 21°02′57″E
- Products: Lignite

The Miraš (Albanian: Mirash, Serbian Cyrillic: Мираш) is a depleted open-cast coal mine located near near Obiliq, District of Pristina, Kosovo.

== Production ==
The two mines cover a working surface area of 10 km^{2} (3.9 sq mi) and, if all the external dump sites from 1956 to 1991 are included, the mine covers a total surface area of 11 km^{2} (4.2 sq mi).

The coal extraction has been developed in two coal mines, with a projected output target of 16.7 million tons of coal per year, not including the removal of 28 million cubic meters of overburden. The coal is mined by using a rotor excavator and transportation to the generating plants (Kosovo A and Kosovo B) is on conveyor belts. Until the end of 1998, a total of 226,260,825 tons of coal had been mined in Kosovo, representing 1.58% of the estimated geological deposits and 1.96% of the total exploitable reserves.

At the time, the projected production of this coal mine has been set at 8.6 million tons per year for coal, and 14 million m^{3} per year for overburden. In order to reach this target the equipment in the mines includes 11 bucket wheel excavators linked to automatic conveyor belt systems and four stacker spreaders. This same equipment has been in operation for the past 15–37 years.

The mine produced was primarily used as a fuel for the electricity generation at the thermal power stations Kosovo A and Kosovo B. Along with the Bardhi i Madh coal mine, the mine was closed during the 2010-s when Sibovc Coal Mine (southwest field) began expanding and increasing the production levels.

== Separation ==
The coal processing needs for the Kosovo Energy Corporation (KEK) are carried out in two locations, close to two power plants "Kosovo A" and "Kosovo B". The separation plant in "Kosovo A" is spread out due to the various progressive phases of developments that have occurred, and is made up of the following facilities:

- Separation "Kaltërt" ("Blue"), with annual capacity of 10 million tons
- Grind Mill "Bardhi B", annual capacity of 5 million tons
- Separation "Bardhi A", annual capacity of 5.5 million tons
- Separation to sort Miraš, annual capacity of 2.4 million tons
- Classic separation of Miraš, annual capacity of 3 million tons

Close to the "Kosovo B" power plant, there is a grinding mill and a warehouse specifically used for the needs of this power plant with an annual capacity of 6.5 million tons.

== Drying Plant ==
This plant, used for the drying of wet coal, consists of two buildings:

- Drying Plant I, in operation since 1964
- Drying Plant II, in operation since 1972

The capacity of both drying plants is sufficient for processing 1,200,000 tons of wet coal per year to produce 610,000 tons of dried coal. The original buildings are still being used, despite the fact that they are 27–35 years old.

== See also ==
- Coal in Kosovo
- Natural resources of Kosovo
