= Coal in Kosovo =

Energy source in Kosovo

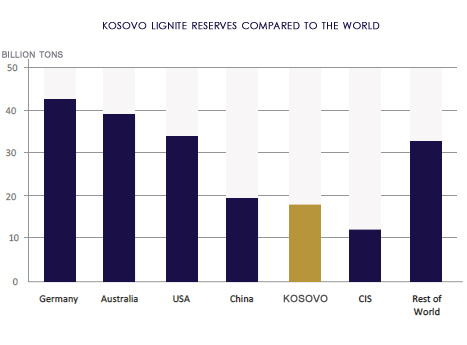
Kosovo has the 5th largest lignite reserves in the world.

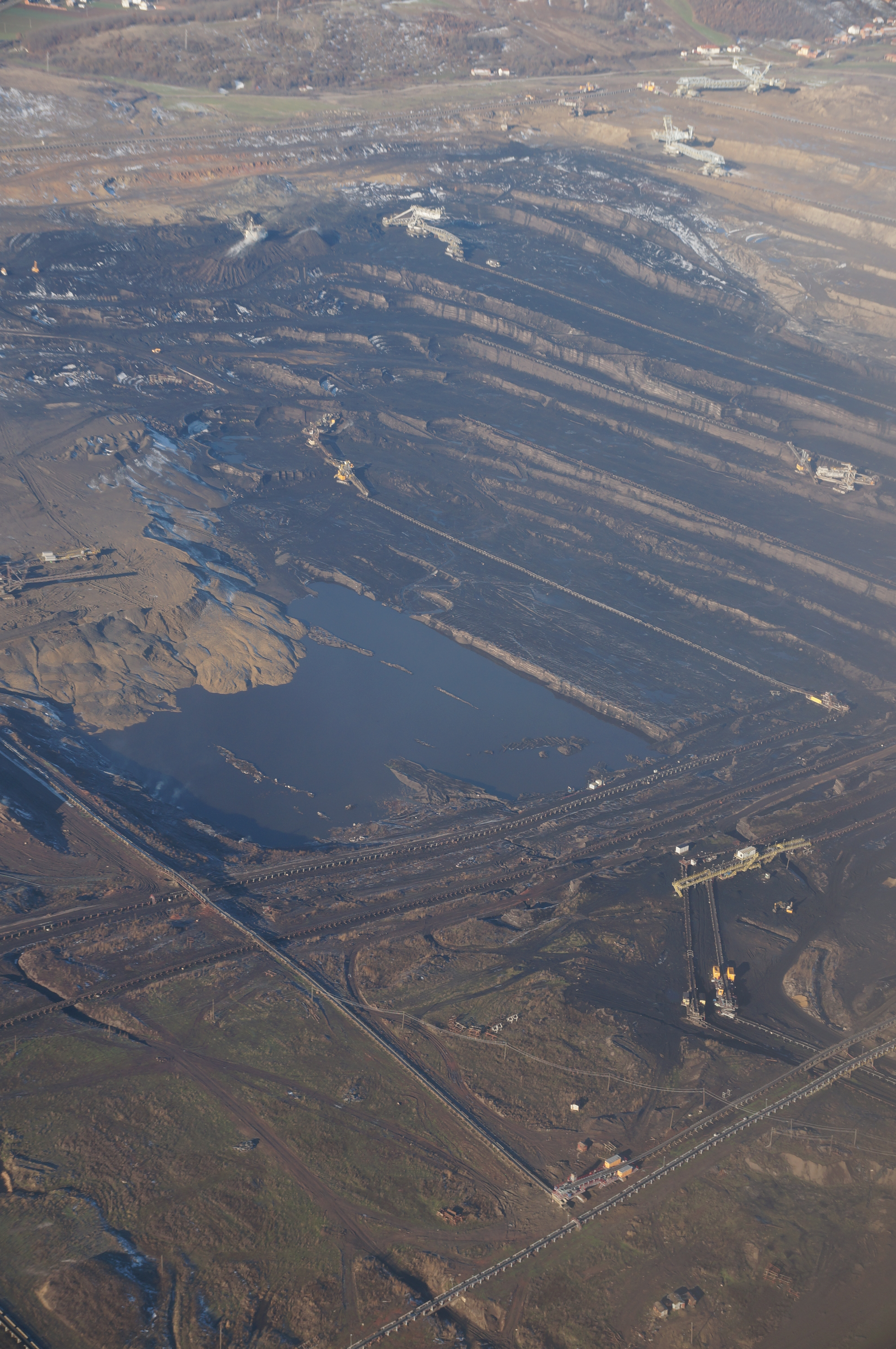
Bardh i Madh coal mine

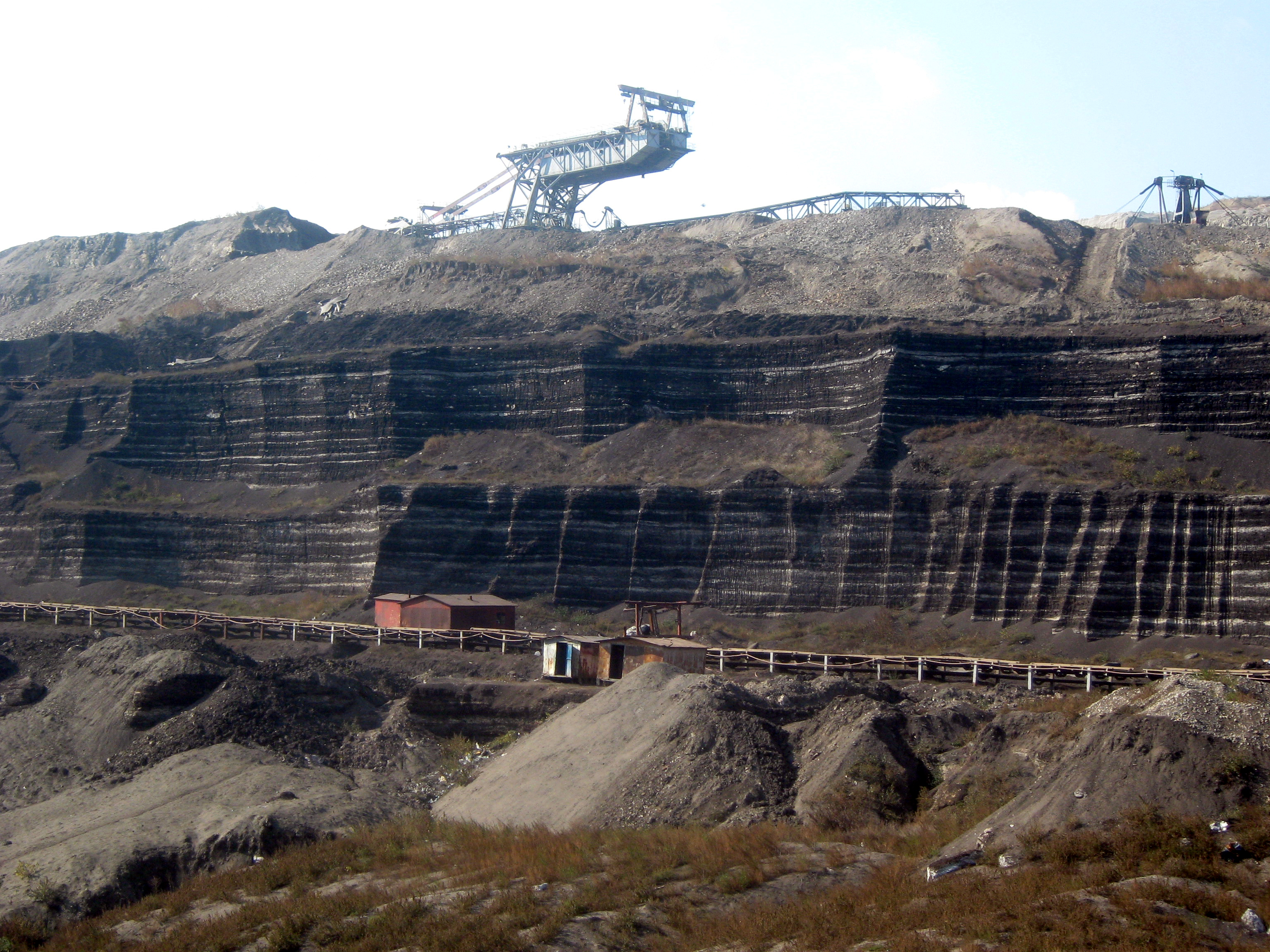
Mirash coal mine

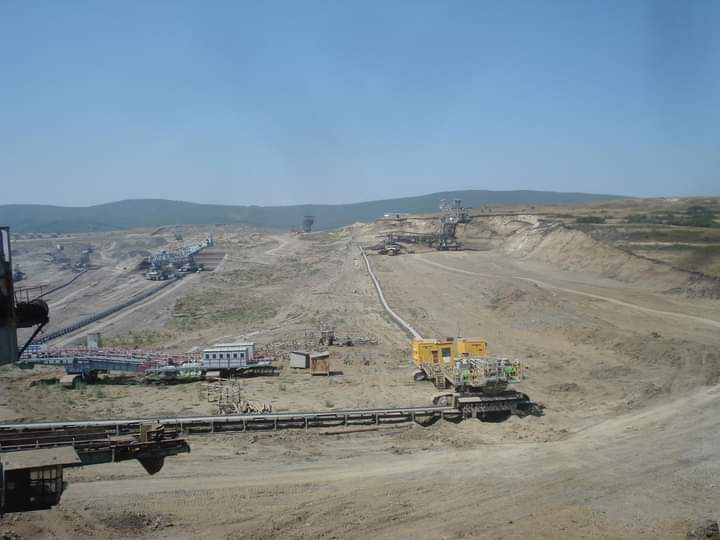
Sibovc Coal Mine

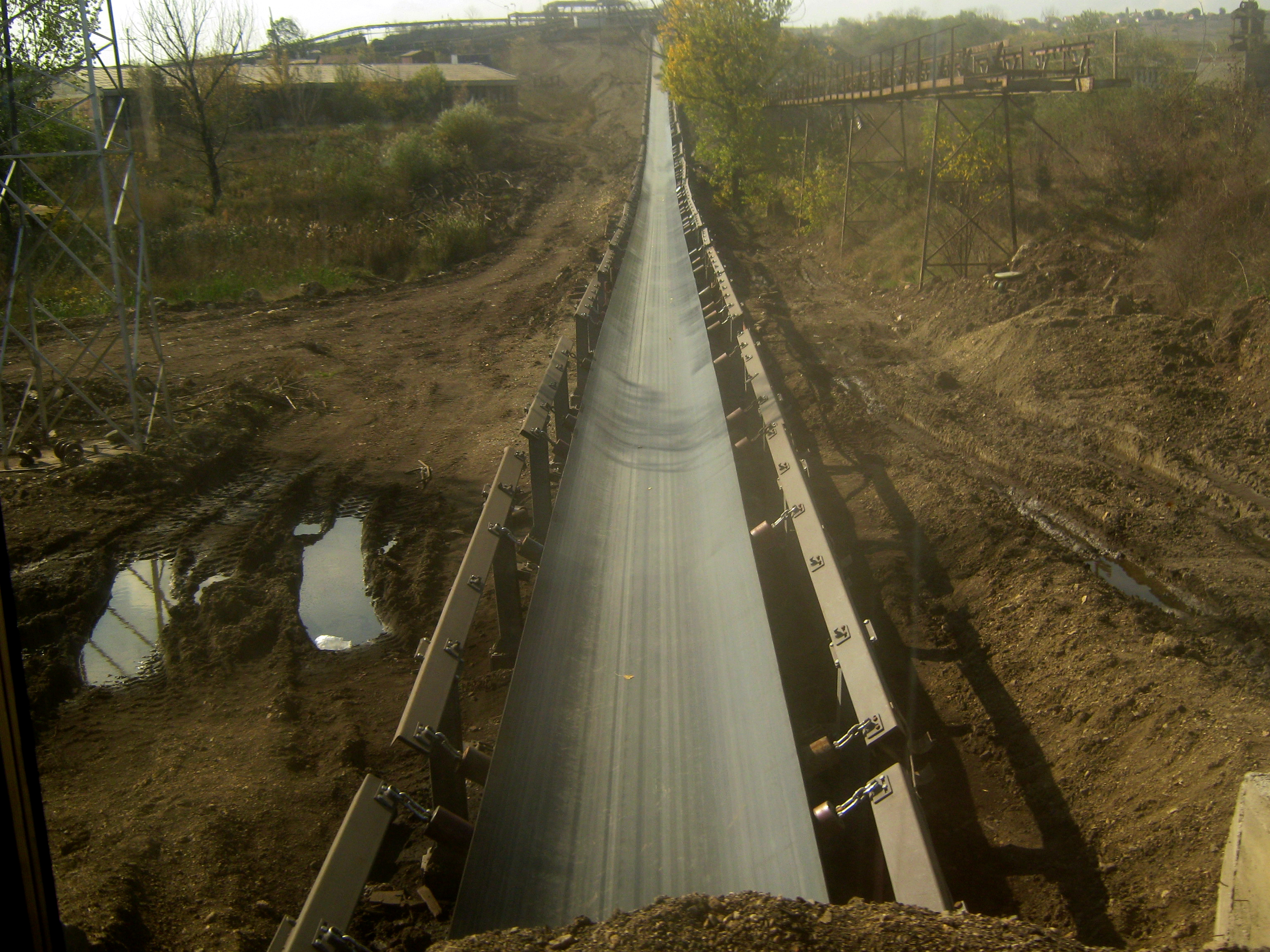
Coal transportation platform from coal mines up to the power plants in Kosovo

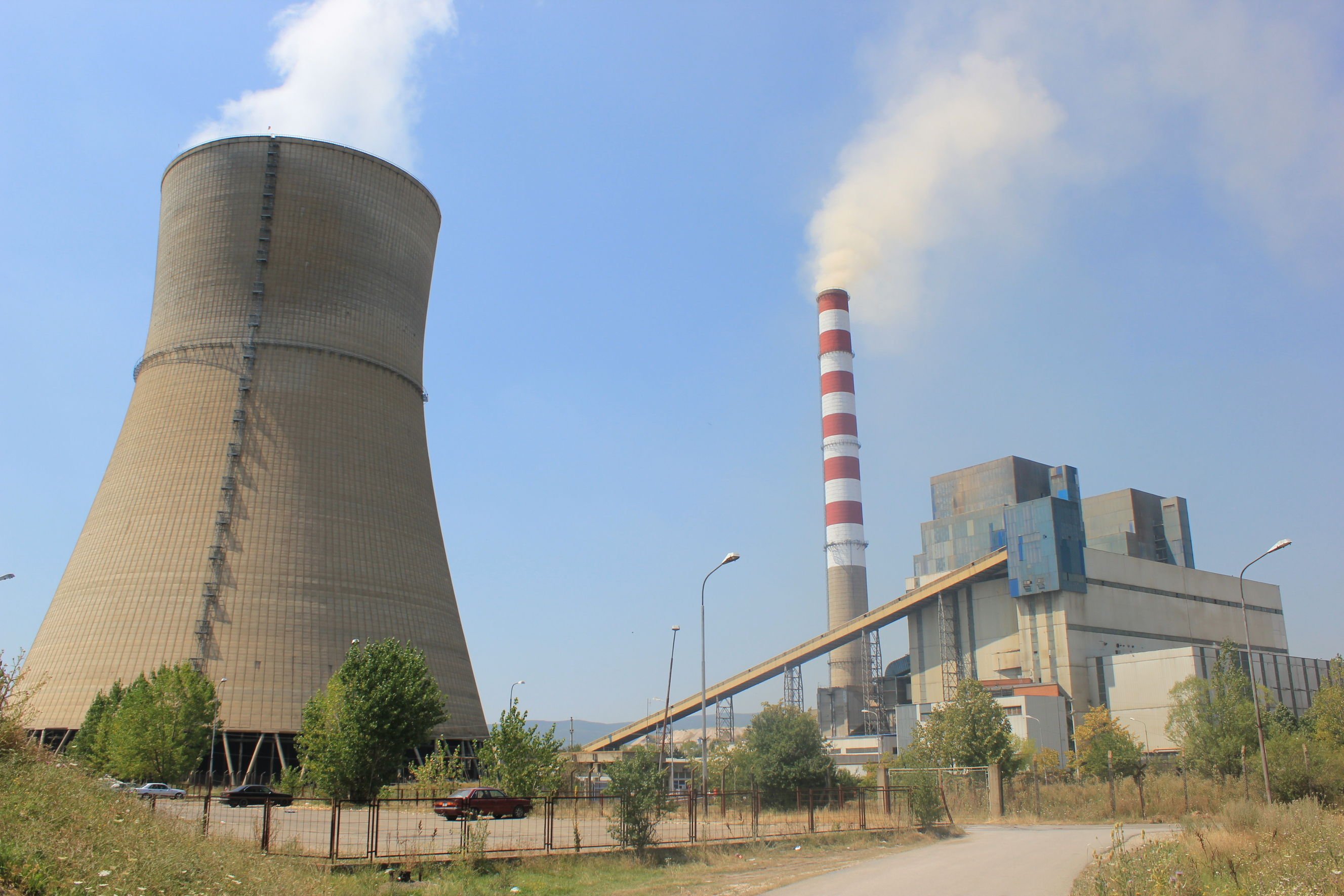
Kosovo B Power Station in Kastriot

Lignite coal in Kosovo is and will continue to be an important local energy source due to its high reserves. Kosovo is very rich in lignite and accounts around 90% of Kosovo's electricity production. The nation has the 5th largest lignite reserves in the world and the 3rd in Europe. The lignite is distributed across the Kosovo, Dukagjin and Drenica Basins, although mining has so far been restricted to the Kosovo Basin. The lignite is of high quality for the generation of electricity and compares well with the lignite resources of neighbouring countries on a range of parameters. Kosovo's lignite varies in net calorific value from 6.28-9.21 MJ/kg, averaging 7.8 MJ/kg. The deposits (Pliocene in age) can be up to 100 m thick, but average 40 m, and possess an average strip ratio of 1.7:1.

== Background ==
The first systematic records of lignite exploitation date from 1922, when small-scale, shallow underground room-and-pillar mining commenced in the Kosovo Basin. New mines were opened to satisfy the needs by increasing generation capacities Large-scale mining of lignite began with the first production from the Mirash (1958) and Bardhimadh (1969) open-pit mines, using bucketwheel excavators. Geologically, Kosovo's lignite mines exploit one of the most favorable lignite deposits in Europe. The average stripping ratio is 1.7m3 of waste to one tonne of coal and the total estimated economically exploitable resource represents one of the richest in Europe, which would allow ambitious power generation and expansion schemes in forthcoming decades. Cumulative exploitation from the commencement of mining in 1922 up to the end of 2004 has amounted to 265 megatons.

The first unit of Kosova A power plant started working in 1962 with a power of generation 65 MW. The last unit A5 was built in 1975. A1 and A2 units are out of function and they are planned to be decommissioned. A3, A4 and A5 units are still in function. Kosova B power plant is composed of two units. The first unit was built in 1983 with a capacity of 340MW, while the second unit was built in 1984 with the same power of generation. The conditions in Kosova B power plant have improved after recent investments. The coal mines and power plants are located in Kastrioti (Kosovo), only 3 km away from the borders of the municipality of Prishtina.

== Basins ==
The lignite in Kosovo is found in three main basins: Kosovo basin, Dukagjin basin and Drenica basin. The Kosovo basin has so far been the main basin used for mining. Lignite exploitation in Kosovo was first recorded in 1922, in the Kosovo basin, when mining began. Kosovo Basin has a surface area of 274 km^{2}. The Dukagjini basin has a surface area of 49 km^{2}. Other basins encompass a surface area of 5.1 km^{2}.The lignite in Kosovo is low in sulfur content and has a good lime concentration which means it can absorb sulfur during combustion. Overall, the lignite mines in Kosovo have among the most favorable characteristics in Europe. Average stripping ratio of waste to coal is 1.7m^{3} to 1, and it is of high quality for electricity generation. The net calorific value of lignite in Kosovo varies between 6.28 and 9.21 MJ/kg, with an average of 7.8 MJ/kg. The humidity ranges between 38 and 48%, the ash percentage between 9.84 and 21.32%, and sulfur content between 0.64 and 1.51%. Kosovo has the second largest reserves of exploitable lignite in Europe, only after Germany and Poland. Lignite is the major source of energy in Kosovo and will remain to be so due to its high reserves.

=== Kosovo basin ===
The Kosovo basin has around 12 billion tons of lignite. The coal in the Kosovo basin is of lignite type and its geological age is the Early Pontian P1. The ratio of coal to waste land in the Kosovo basin is 1:185. It has an average thickness of 45m. The occurrences of coal in this basin range from the surface outcrop to 310 m maximum under the surface level. Lignite in the Kosovo basin is of high quality, the average values for the most important parameters are:

- ETU (lower calorific value): 7,300 kJ/kg
- S (Sulphur) < 1%
- L (moisture): range from 45 to 47%
- H (ash): 18%

The majority of lignite is found in the centre of the Kosovo basin, where the thickness also reaches a maximum of 110m. The Kosovo basin has two excavation points which are active and used for extracting lignite for the thermal power plants in Kosovo, and they have a capacity of 8,000,000 tons per year. Up to 2009 it was reported that around 200 million tons of coal had been exploited, which constitute only 2% of the total reserves of coal in the Kosovo basin. In the southern parts of the Kosovo basin there is the Babush mine which also has a determined extent of coal reserves, with a surface of 0.5 km^{2} the Babush mine possesses geological reserves of coal of 3.7 million tons. The coal in this mine has the following values of the quality parameters:

- ETU = 7,350 kJ/kg
- S <1%
- L = 40-47 %
- H = 22%

While there is a current approximation of reserves in this mine, explorations are not yet complete and the possibility for wider reserves exists. Based on analysis of the quantity of lignite reserves and the exploitation conditions within the Kosovo Basin, the Ministry of Energy and Mining in Kosovo has classified Zone C or the so-called the "New Mine" as the most suitable for exploitation, together with Zone D of Kosovo basin or the so-called "Dardhishtë" in Albanian. Zone G and I of the Kosovo basin have also been evaluated as very suitable for future exploitation based on their reserve quantity and overburden to coal ratio. These two zones have been evaluated to be of sufficient capacity to enable the construction and running of new power plants. These four zones have been classified as Priority 1 (Zone C and Zone D), and Priority 2 (Zone G and Zone I), while the zones classified under Priority 3 have poor conditions for exploitation, either due to degradation such as Zone E or poor overburden to coal ratio such as Zones F, H, J and K. All of these zones (apart from Zone J) are also limited due to population high densities.

There are three coal mines in Kosovo basin, of which only Sibovc Coal Mine is active, while the Mirash coal mine and Bardhimadh coal mine are depleted.

=== Dukagjini basin ===
The Dukagjini basin contains three coal series:

- Mio Pliocene series, (before the Pontian age)
- Early Pliocene series (during the Pontian age)
- Late Pliocene series (during the Levantinian age)

The north of the Dukagjini basin is the most productive, in the localities Kline, where the average thickness of coal is 40m. The values of the basic quality parameters in this basin are:

- ETU = 600 to 10,000 kJ/kg
- S = 1.06%
- L = 31 to 69%
- H = 20 to 27%

Explorations in this basin have also not been completed; thus, with further exploration it is anticipated that reserves will increase by two billion tons. The regions of Peja, Gjakova and Prizren remain prospective for further research and exploration.

=== Drenica basin ===
While the Kosovo basin is located in the east of Kosovo and Dukagjini in the west, the Drenica basin lies in between them with the lowest potential compared to the other two. The Drenica basin consists of two coal-beds: Skenderaj and Drenica. The Skenderaj coal-bed encompasses a surface area of 5.1 km^{2} with an average thickness of coal of 15m. The coal in this basin has an overburden to coal ratio of 1.35 : 1 m^{3}/t. The following are reserves that have been determined in the Skenderaj field:

- Category B: 10,876,546 t
- Category C1: 48,850,608 t
- Category C2: approximately 10,000,000 t
- Total reserves: 69,724,154

The values for the quality parameters in this coal field are:

- ETU = 7,300 kJ/kg
- L = 32.46%
- H = 25.60%
- S = 1.58%

The Drenas field has an area of around 3.2 km^{2} and reserves:

- Category C1: around 21 million
- Total reserves of around 90 million.

While the Kosovo and Dukagjini Basin can be exploited for electricity generation, the smaller basin of Drenica cannot be utilised for energy production, although it can be exploited for industrial purposes; thus, it is not of any lower importance. The Drenica Basin consists of two Zones: Zone I (in Skenderaj) and Zone II (in Drenas). Zone I of the Drenica basin has around 70 million tons of lignite reserves, while Zone II has around 25 million tons in geological reserves. The average caloric value of lignite in both zones is 7,300 kJ/kg, while the estimated average coal width in Zone I is 200 m and in Zone II 10m.

== See also ==
- Siboc coal mine
- Mirash coal mine
- Bardh i Madh coal mine
- Kosovo A Power Station
- Kosovo B Power Station
- Electrical energy in Kosovo
- Natural resources of Kosovo
