= Kadri Bistrica =

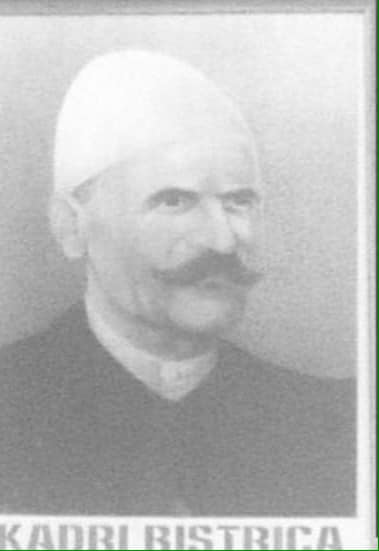
- Born: 1882; Bistrica e Shalës, Albanik, Ottoman Empire
- Died: 15 October 1941 (aged 58–59); Sllatina, Vushtrri, German-occupied Serbia
- Burial place: Bistrica e Shalës, Albanik, Kosovo
- Military career
- Allegiance: Albania
- Service years: 1941–1947
- Rank: Commander
- Unit: Vullnetari
- Commands: Balli Kombëtar
- Awards: Hero of Kosovo (posthumously)

Kadri Zahit Bistrica (1882 – 15 October 1941) was an Albanian nationalist and Vullnetari commander in Kosovo during World War II. He was one of the most notable fighters in the region Shala e Bajgorës.

A street is named after him in Mitrovica, Kosovo, and a sculpture was placed in his birth place in Bistricë in 2022.

== Sources ==
- Muharremi, Bajram (2022). Kadri Bistrica-Gur i kufirit të atdheut. Redaksia e Revistës Dituria. ISBN 9198776401.
