= Košutovo =

Košutovo may refer to several inhabited places:

- Košutovo, Leposavić
- Koshtovë, Mitrovica
