= Mjekić =

- Settlement
- Location in Kosovo
- Coordinates: 42°40′41″N 20°58′22″E
- Location: Kosovo
- District: Pristina
- Municipality: Obiliq
- Time zone: UTC+1 (CET)
  - Summer (DST): UTC+2 (CEST)

Mjekić is a settlement in central Kosovo. It is situated west of Obilić.
