= Dren, Leposavić =

Dren
- Village
- Interactive map of Dren
- Country: Kosovo
- District: Mitrovica
- Municipality: Leposaviq

Population (2024)
  - Total: 86

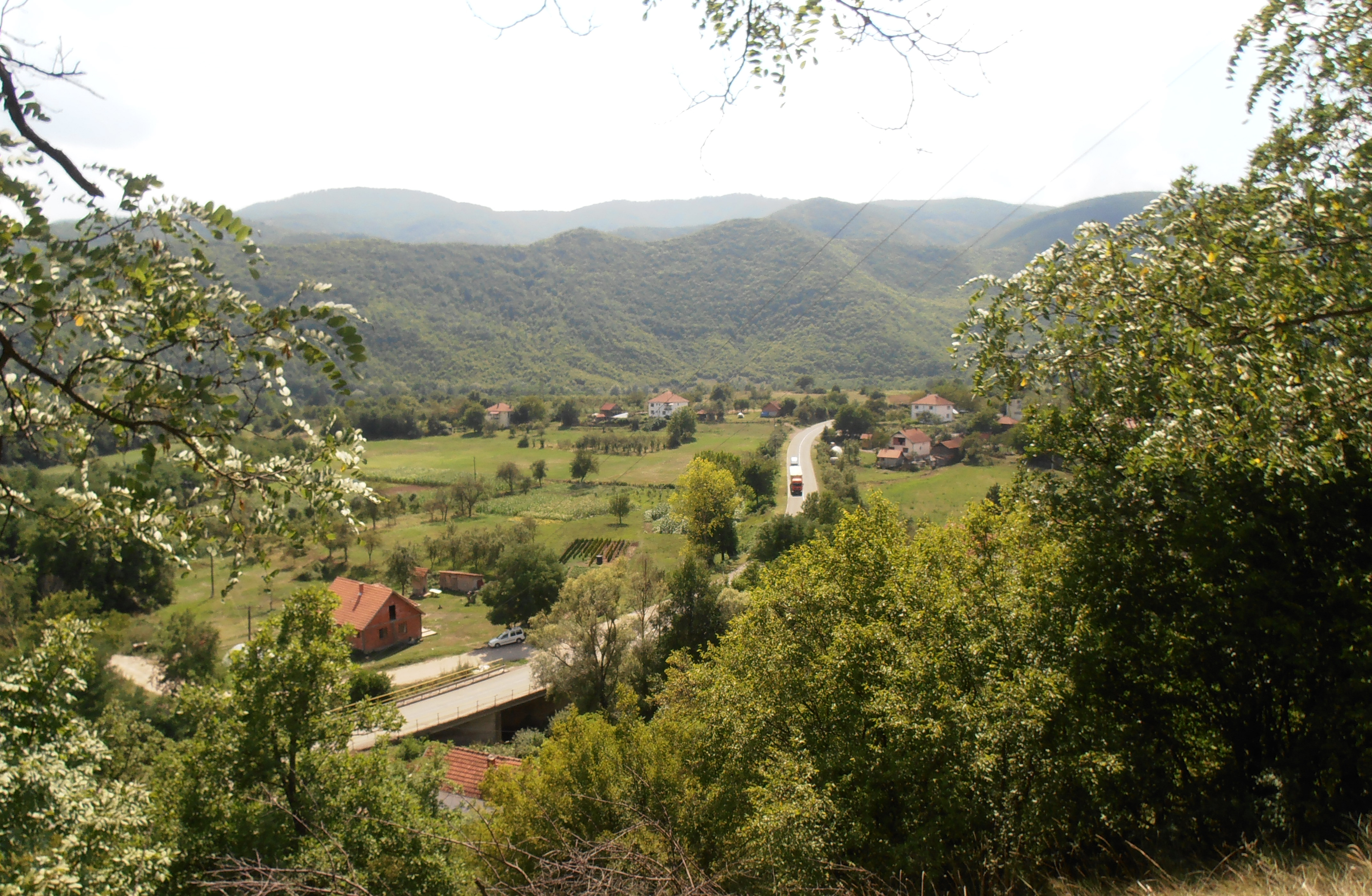
Dren in 2014

Dren (Serbian Cyrillic: Дрен, Albanian definite form: Dreni) is a village located in the municipality of Leposavić, in Kosovo. According to 2009 estimates for the 2011 Kosovan census, it has 129 inhabitants, of whom the majority are Serbs.
