= Crepulje mine =

Lead and zinc mine in Kosovo

- Location within Kosovo

Location
- Location: Leposavić, District of Mitrovica, Kosovo; 42°52′32.99″N 20°40′40.01″E

Production
- Products: Lead, Zinc

Owner
- Company: Lydian Internacional

The Crepulje mine is one of the largest lead and zinc mines in Kosovo. The mine is located in Leposavić. The mine has reserves amounting to 14 million tonnes of ore grading 2.17% lead and 20.07% zinc thus resulting 303,800 tonnes of lead and 2,810,000 tonnes of zinc.
