= Cerajë =

Cerajë Ceranja
- Village
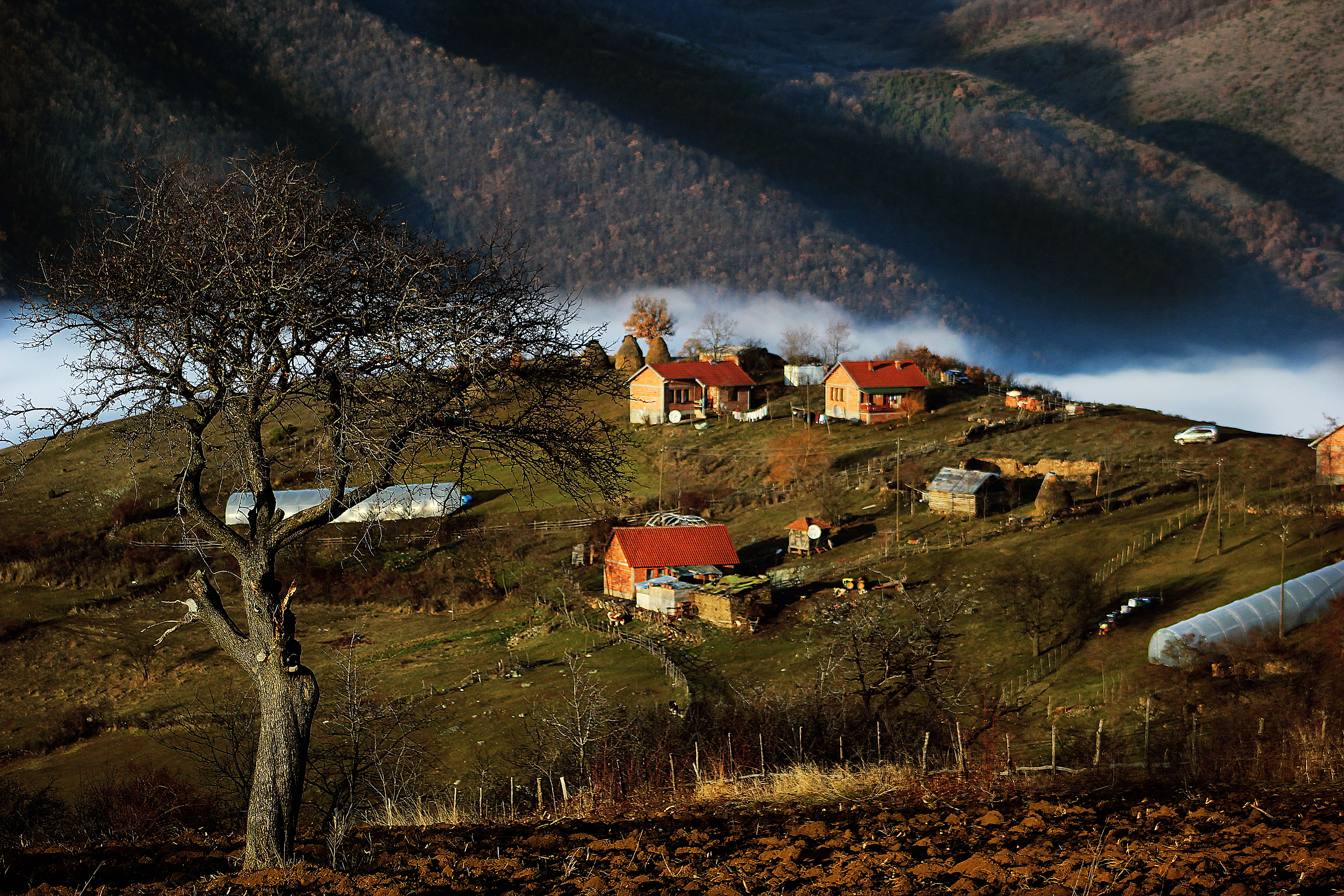
- Fshati Cerajë në veri të Mitrovicës gjatë një dite dimri me mjegull, fshat ky me peisazh të bukur

- Location within Kosovo
- Coordinates: 43°01′30″N 20°51′30″E
- Location: Kosovo
- District: Mitrovica
- Municipality: Leposaviq
- Elevation: 2,820 ft (860 m)

Population (2024)
  - Total: 40
- Time zone: UTC+1 (CET)
  - Summer (DST): UTC+2 (CEST)
- Area code: +383

Cerajë (Albanian definite form: Ceraja) or Ceranja (Serbian Cyrillic: Церања), is a village in the municipality of Leposaviq, in northern Kosovo. It has a population of 150-300, all ethnic Albanians, and is one of three Albanian-inhabited villages in Leposaviq. Another alternative name of the village is Kreshëbardhë (Albanian definite form: Kreshëbardha).

== History ==
During World War II, Ceraja along with the village of Sllatina (Vushtrri) would have a high Chetnik presence. In 1941, Albanian irregulars, mostly from the Tribe of Shala, would drive them out of the two villages.

== Notable people ==
- Jakup Ceraja, Albanian poet and writer
