= Natural resources of Kosovo =

Natural resources are abundant in Kosovo. Kosovo is mainly rich in lignite and mineral resources such as: coal, zinc, lead, silver and chromium, but also with productive agricultural land. Kosovo is also rich in forests, rivers, mountains and soil; Kosovo is especially rich in coal, being aligned among European countries as the third with the largest coal reserves. Kosovo possesses around 14,700 billion tons of lignite in reserves, which aligns Kosovo as the country with the fifth largest lignite reserves in the world.

== Natural resources through history ==
Natural resources in Kosovo were once the "backbone of industry". However, output is currently low due to insufficient investments in equipment. Among these natural resources that were previously important in the Kosovo economy were minerals and metals such as: lignite, aluminum, chrome, magnesium, nickel, lead, zinc, and several different construction materials. Kosovo was historically a mining district for the former Yugoslavia. The industrial complex Trepça in Mitrovica "was the largest mining operation in the former Yugoslavia". During the time of Yugoslavia, Kosovo possessed 50% of all of Yugoslavia's nickel reserves, 36% of lignite, 48% of lead and zinc reserves, 47% of the magnesium reserves, and 32.4% of kaolinite reserves. During this time, mining was Kosovo's growth engine; however, the sector faced a decline from the 1990s. Even prior to Yugoslavia, the region's natural resources were explored and extracted. During the reign of King Milutin (mid 14th century) the mine in Novo Brdo was considered the richest mine with silver in the Balkans, while the other two mines in Kosovo after Artana were Trepça and Janjevo. During the mid 14th and 15th century, Artana was the heart of the local economy, it was known as the city of silver and gold. Due its enormous importance, it was also highly protected and was the last city to fall in the hands of the Ottomans during the invasion in the 15th century. Data from 1931 to 1998 show that total production by the industrial complex Trepça during this time was:

- Lead: 2,066,000 tons
- Zinc: 1,371,000 tons
- Silver: 2,569 tons
- Bismuth: 4,115 tons
- Cadmium (1968–1987) 1,655 tons.

From 1922 up to 2004, cumulative exploitation of lignite reserves amounted to 265Mt. However, from September 2005 to the latest data in 2007, Trepça only produced lead, zinc and copper at an average of 5,000 tons per month. Some published research claims that Trepça still has potential for production of 999,000 tons of lead, 670,000 tons of zinc, and 2,200 tons of silver. Although mining of Kosovo's most noted mineral resources such as lead, zinc and silver was an important part of its economy prior to 1999, active mining of lead, zinc and silver mines was halted at the start of the Kosovo conflict. Although these mines present a good opportunity for investment, their privatization has been difficult due to ownership issues.

Total natural resource rents in 2010, as calculated by the World Bank were 1.52% of GDP. Agriculture has also been an important sector of the economy in Kosovo due to its richness in agricultural land. It used to constitute 25% of the total output in Kosovo. However, today, the use of agriculture land is fairly low in Kosovo. 53% of the total land in Kosovo is considered to be arable land. The average farm is around 1.4 hectares.

== Land ==
Since it is the surface upon which most economic activities occur, land is one of the most important natural resources contributing towards economic development. Kosovo has a total surface area of 10,877 square kilometers which is classified as: 53 to 54.23% agricultural land, 40.92% forest land and 4.85% infertile land. Kosovo possesses a wide variety of soils. It is assessed that 15% of the soil in Kosovo is high quality soil, followed by 29% of medium quality, so 56% of all soil is poor quality soil, while the high and medium quality make up 44% of the soil in Kosovo. The high and medium quality soil is composed 11% by humus soil, 8.4% grey carbonate land, 7.8% alluvial soil, and other dark and serpentine soils. The poor quality soil is composed of diluvial lands, swamps, acidic grey soils and other infertile soils, and it mainly lies on hilly areas and mountains.

=== Agricultural land ===
The main economic activity in Kosovo is agriculture due to its underdevelopment. 54.23% of the land in Kosovo is qualified to be agricultural land, or 342,400 hectares of its area. However, the formal agricultural sector employs only 3.9% of the people in the workforce. Out of the 54.23% of land which is agricultural land, 15% of it is considered to be agricultural land of good quality, 29% of medium quality agricultural land and the remaining 56% is of poorer quality land.

=== Forest land ===
Forests have a great importance in Kosovo and they are one of the greatest natural resources of Kosovo. They encompass 40.92% of the total land area in Kosovo. Forests in Kosovo are of high importance because they are rich in biodiversity. Kosovo has a total of 464,800 hectares of forests, and another 28,200 hectares of forest land.

=== Flora ===
Kosovo possess one of the richest flora in the Balkans, although it encompasses only 2.3% of the area in the Balkans. The most important in these regards are the mountains Albanian Alps and the Sharr Mountains. Up to now, approximately 2,500 species of flora have been identified in Kosovo. This high plant diversity in Kosovo represents a valuable natural resource, especially considering its low surface area. However, even with these rich resources, the flora in Kosovo has not been used to the benefit of the economy, not even in the past.

== Wood ==
Wood is used in Kosovo as the main source of heating. Studies reveal that households in Kosovo consume 7.58 m^{3} of wood each during one year, or a total consumption of 1.525 million m^{3} per year.

== Water ==
Kosovo can secure around 131 million m^{3} of water per year from its underground water and river flows.

Kosovo possesses relatively low reserves of water as compared to its needs. The per capita water per year in Kosovo is estimated to be at 1,600 m^{3}/s. The average annual water flow in Kosovo is calculated to be approximately 3.8 billion or 121.2 m^{3}/s. Total accumulated volume of water in current accumulation points is 569.69 million m^{3}. Apart from having insufficient water resources to meet its people's and economy's needs, Kosovo is also characterized by an unequal distribution of water across its surface. Hydropower is only modestly used, due to its low potential. Water resources are mostly located in the western part, as opposed to the East and South East which have smaller reserves but larger needs for water.

There is lack of research regarding groundwater reserves in Kosovo. Groundwater reserves in Kosovo are mainly located in different formations of rocks. Although these reserves have a high importance for drinking water needs as well as agriculture and industry, they are mainly used through private wells. In the area of the White Drin river basin there are several groundwater accumulations, which have a total area of 998 km^{2}, usable volume of 271 million m^{3} and an estimated total capacity of 511 million m^{3}.

=== Lakes ===
In Kosovo, there are only few natural lakes. Among its artificial lakes are: Radoniq, Gazivoda, Batllava, Përlepnicë and Badovc, which have the following characteristics:

Gazivoda Lake:

- Area of basin: 1,060 km^{2} (410 sq mi)
- Average water flow: 13.5 m^{3}/s
- Total volume of accumulation: 390 m^{3}

Lake Batllava:

- Area of basin: 226 km^{2} (87 sq mi)
- Average water flow: 1.06 m^{3}/s
- Total volume of accumulation: 30 m^{3}

Badovc Lake:

- Area of basin: 103 km^{2} (40 sq mi)
- Average water flow: 1.05 m^{3}/s
- Total volume of accumulation: 26.4 m^{3}

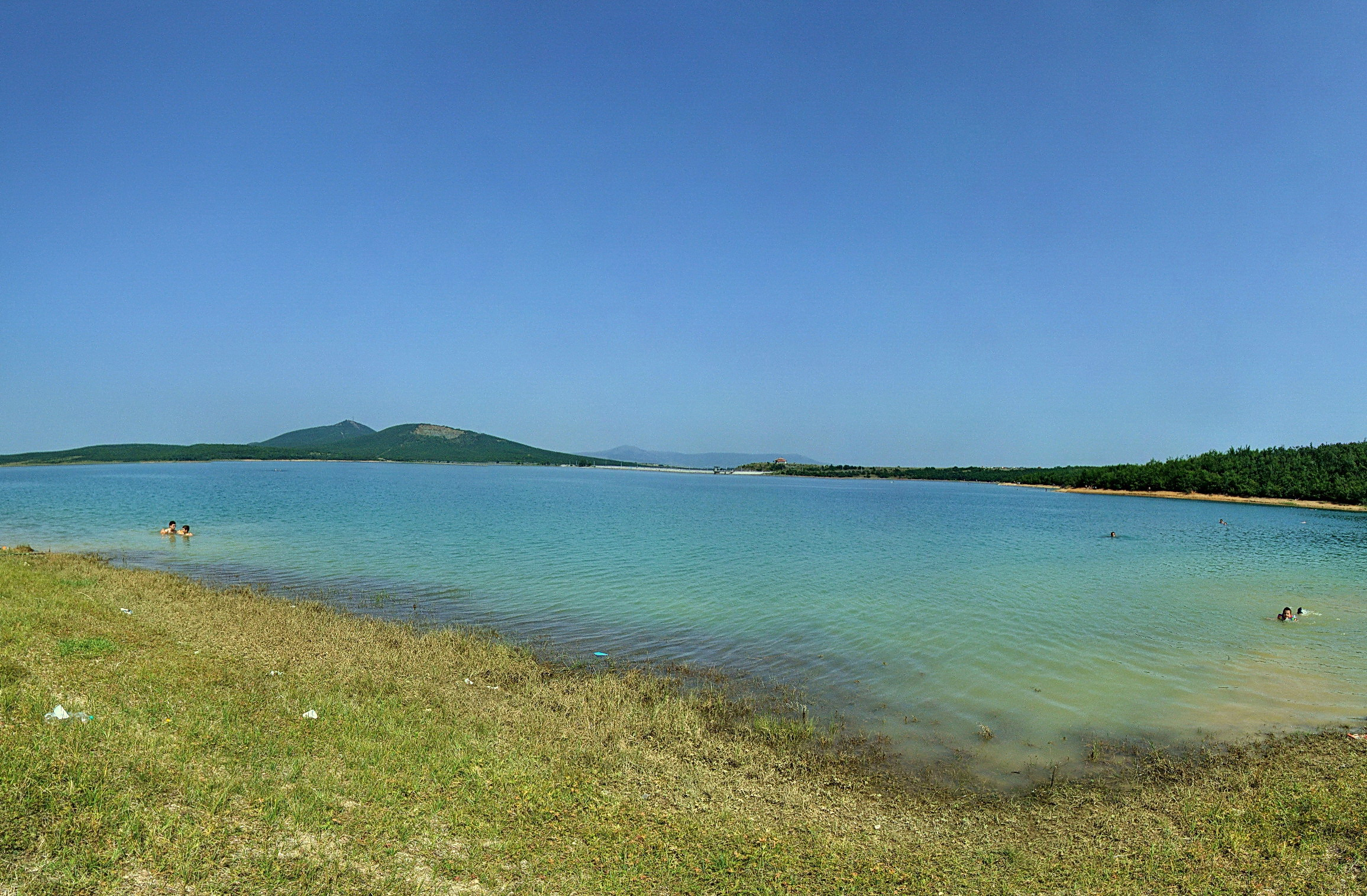
Radoniq Lake

Radoniq Lake:

- Area of basin: 130 km^{2} (50 sq mi)
- Average water flow: 0.16 m^{3}/s
- Total volume of accumulation: 113 m^{3}

=== Rivers ===
From the rivers in Kosovo:

- 50.7% belong to (flow to) the Black Sea, these are: Ibar, Morava e Binçës and Sitnica together with its branches Llapi and Drenica;
- 43.5% to the Adriatic Sea, these are: White Drin and its branches in Deçani, Peje, Prizren, Erenik, Klina, Topluha Plava and Mirusha Waterfalls;
- and 5.8% to the Aegean Sea, these are: Lepenci river and its branch Nerodimka.

The rivers in Kosovo have irregular flows during the year, but they typically have high flows in the Winter season and early Spring. The four main rivers in Kosovo are: White Drin, Lepenci, Morava and Iber. The river White Drin is the longest river in Kosovo with a length of 122 km (76 mi). Below are the length and surface area of the main rivers in Kosovo:

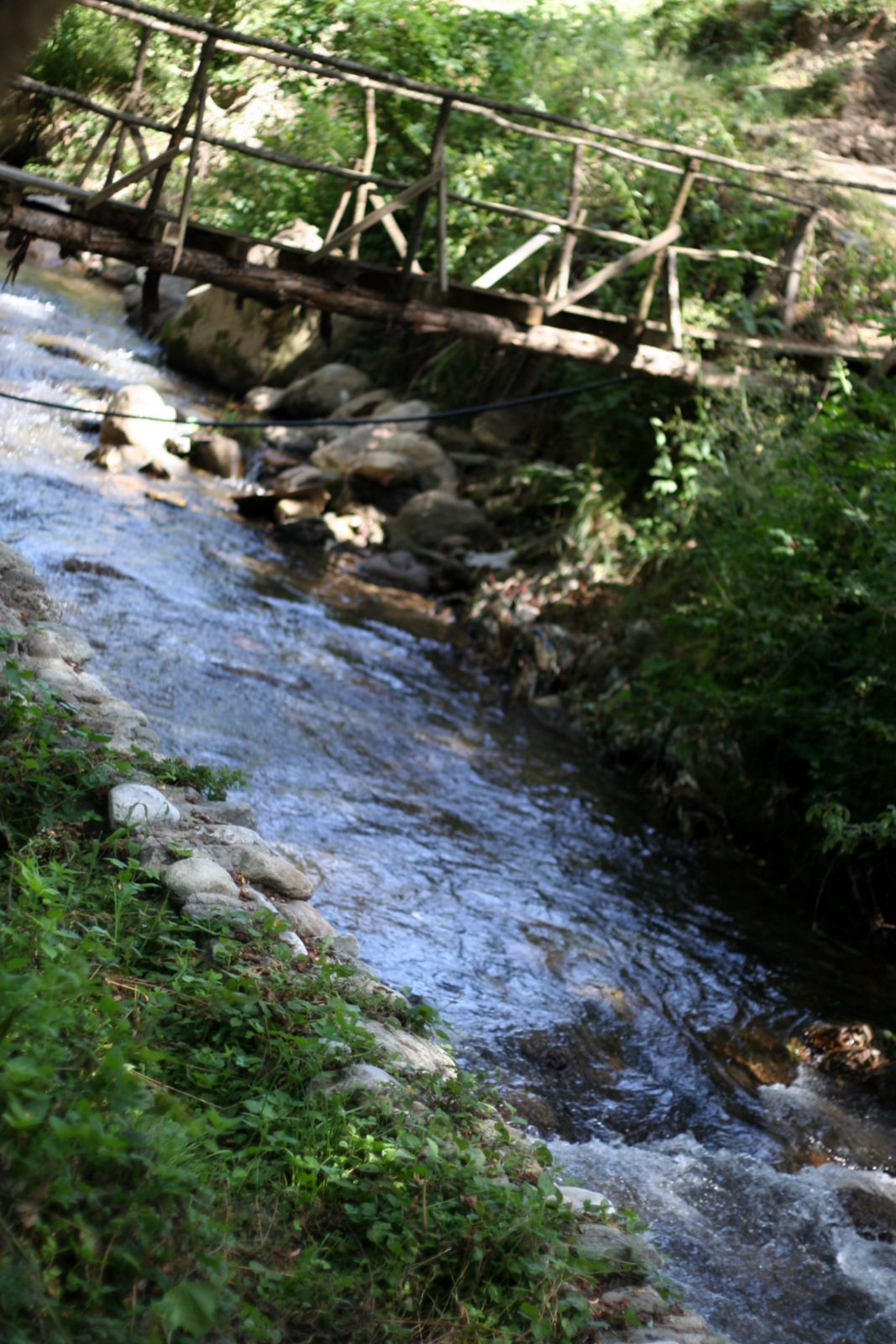
River in Kosovo

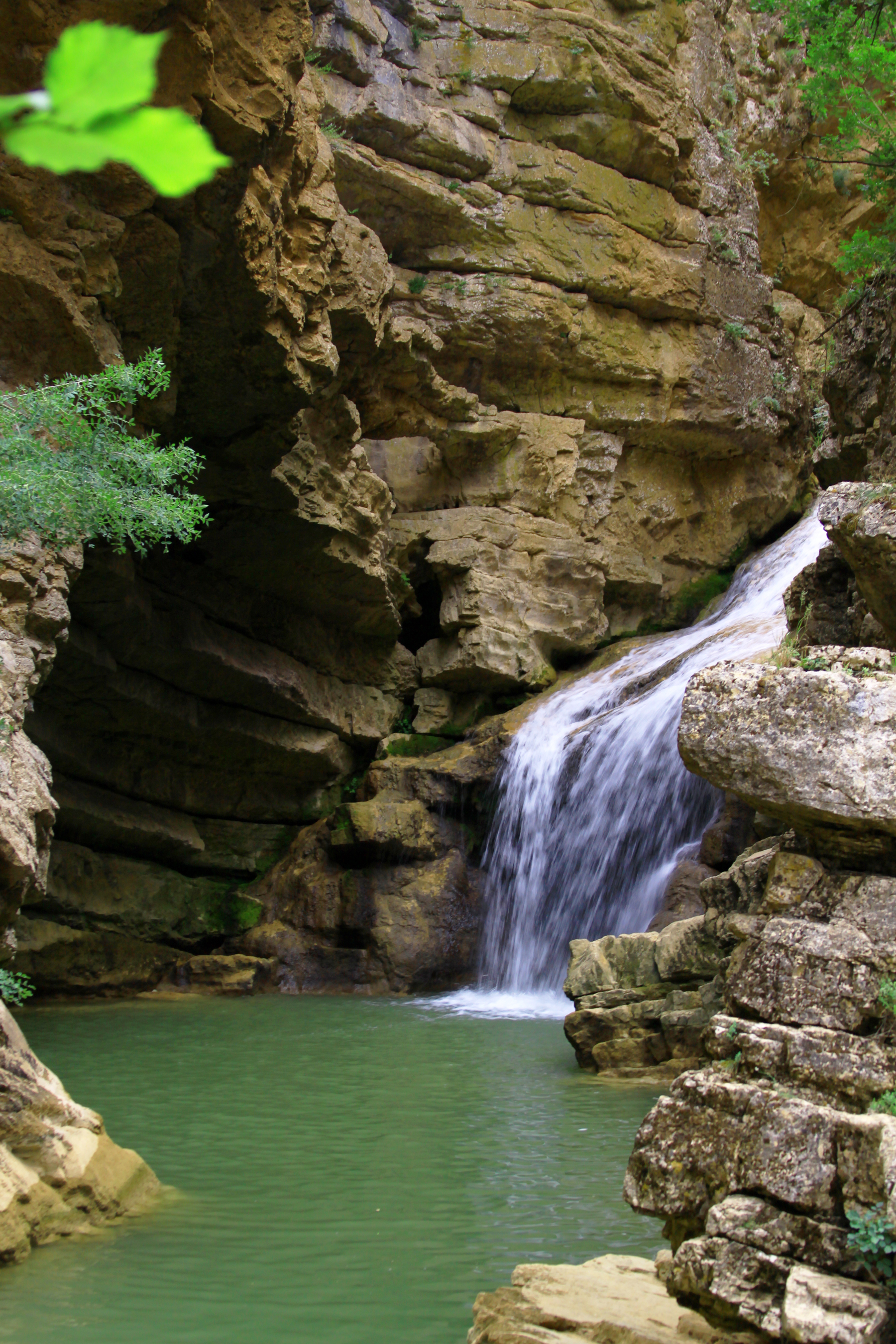
Mirusha waterfalls

Table 1: Length in kilometers of main rivers in Kosovo
Name	Length in km inside the territory of Kosovo	Surface m^{2}
White Drin	122	4.622
Sitnica	90	2.873
Peja river	62	424.9
Morava	60	1.552
Lepenci	53	679.0
Erenik	51	510.3
Iber	42	1.155
Prizren river	31	262.6

Table 2: Water accumulation basins, basin areas (S), water flowing quantity (Q, q, and annual flowing) and discharge place
No.	Basin	S [km^{2}]	Q [m^{3}/s]	q [l/s/km^{2}]	Annual flowing [million m^{3}]	Flowing direction
1	White Drin	4649	61.0	14.6	2.200	Adriatic Sea
2	Iber	4009	32.6	8.13	771	Black Sea
3	Morava	1564	6.1	4.35	330	Black Sea
4	Lepenci	0.685	8.7	12.7	307	Aegean Sea

Table 3: The maximum, minimum, and average values of annual flows (Q-m^{3}/s) of hydrometric stations according to river basins
NR.	BASIN	STATION	RIVER	Qmin	Qmes	Qmax
1	WHITE DRIN	Berkovo	Istok	0.48	3.75	1.86
2	WHITE DRIN	Drelaj	Bistrica e Pejes	0.32	4.20	83.50
3	WHITE DRIN	Grykë	Bistrica e Pejes	0.46	5.95	194
4	WHITE DRIN	Klina	Klina	000	1.49	49.20
5	WHITE DRIN	Mirusha	Mirusha	0.02	1.21	23.30
6	WHITE DRIN	Deçan	Bistrica e Deçanit	0.60	4.28	58.00
7	WHITE DRIN	Rakovina	White Drin	0.80	24.64	358
8	WHITE DRIN	Gjakova	Erenik	0.06	12.33	542
9	WHITE DRIN	Piranë	Topluha	0.04	3.47	55.40
10	WHITE DRIN	Gjonaj	White Drin	0.10	48.8	1118
11	WHITE DRIN	Prizren	Bistrica e Prizrenit	0.03	4.47	424
12	IBER	Glogovac	Drenica	0.02	1.52	32.80
13	IBER	Lluzhan	Llapi	0.90	5.01	63.80
14	IBER	Nedakovc	Sitnica	0.50	13.62	328
15	IBER	Milloshevë	Llapi	0.00	4.48	82.70
16	IBER	Prelez	Iber	0.80	13.39	452.80
17	IBER	Leposavić	Iber	0.50	30.85	667
18	MORAVA BINQËS	Konçul	Morava	0.03	9.21	1012
19	MORAVA BINQËS	Domarovc	Lumi Kriva	0.2	2.6	30.8
20	MORAVA BINQËS	Vitina	Morava	0.05	1.06	18.70
21	LEPENCI	Kaçanik	Nerodimja	0.15	4.17	17.50
22	LEPENCI	Đeneral Janković	Lepenci	0.10	10.49	184

=== Thermal and mineral water ===
Kosovo also enjoys rich reserves of thermal and mineral water. Although little attention has been given to these resources, the data collected thus far shows that there are around 30 sources of thermal and mineral water in Kosovo. The main sources of such waters are: "Banja e Pejës", "Banjska" and "Banja e Kllokotit", for which there are also more data since they also operate as "healing thermal baths". Although these sources of water are suitable also for thermal power generation, they are mainly used for healing and recreational purposes. The range of the temperature of these sources of water is between 17 and 54^{0}C and the mineralization degree ranges from 2 to 5 g/L. These thermal and mineral water sources in Kosovo have in their composition also hydrocarbons, sulfates, magnesium and calcium. The following table present the physical-chemical characteristics of some thermo-minerals sources in Kosovo:

Table 4: Physical-chemical characteristics of some thermo-minerals sources in Kosovo
Nr	Locality	Q 1/s	t °C	pH	Mineralization/l	Specific component	Gas content
1	Banja e Pejës	4.00	48.9	6.9	2.04	H_{2}SiO,Ra	CO_{2}
2	Banja e Kllokotit	10.00	32.0	6.6	3.601	CO_{2}Ra,H_{2}	CO_{2}
3	Banjska	2.50	50.0	6.7	1.356	H_{2}SiO_{3}	CO_{2}
4	Banja e Runikut	15.00	24.8	7.1	0.598	-	CO_{2}-N_{2}
5	Burimi i nxehtë i Runikut	5.00	23.0	7.2	0.61	Ra	CO_{2}-N_{2}
6	Gojbula	-	12.0	6.3	2.193	CO_{2}	CO_{2}
7	Uji i Lluzhanit	0.01	14.0	6.3	1.144	Ra,H_{2}SiO_{3}	CO_{2}
8	Studencia	1.0	25.0	7.1	0.670	-	CO_{2}-N_{2}
9	Deçan	2.00	12.5	603	1.433	CO_{2}	CO_{2}
10	Getnja e Sipërme	0.1	9.0	6.6	2.539	-	CO_{2}
11	Poneshi	0.03	13.0	6.3	3.539	CO_{2},Fe	CO_{2}
12	Pokleku	1.00	13.0	6.3	3.52	Fe,Ra,CO_{2},H_{2}SiO_{3}	CO_{2}
13	Uglari	6.00	25.00	6.8	0.688	-	CO_{2}-N_{2}
14	Zhitija	0.3	20.0	6.5	5.126	Fe,CO_{2}	CO_{2}
15	Dobërçani	-	26.8	6.4	-	-	CO_{2},H_{2}S

=== Fisheries ===
Fisheries are evident in Kosovo in most of the freshwater sources; however, there is a lack of fisheries management which makes the maintenance of fisheries difficult. The main fish species found in Kosovo are: trout, catfish, luce, perch, roach, sneep etc.

== Mineral resources ==
Kosovo's main mineral resources are: lead, zinc, silver, nickel, cobalt, chrome, lignite, copper, bauxite, magnesium, iron, and several industrial minerals such as: kaolin, bentonite, quartz, halloysite, diatomite, garnet, asbestos and leucites. Mineral resources in Kosovo are estimated to be worth 13.5 billion euros, based on a survey by the Directorate for Mines and Minerals and the World Bank, from which 6.5 billion euros are attributed to the Mine in Sibofc alone, 3 billion to Trepča, 2 billion to Ferronikel and another 2 billion to other resources across Kosovo. Although the former director for mines and minerals, Hengstmann, claimed of this value, the expert for mines, Adil Januzi claimed that Kosovo's natural resources are of even higher value since Kosovo possesses only lignite of over 13 billion tonnes. The industrial complex Trepča alone possesses more than 60 mineral species which have been identified thus far.

=== Metallic materials ===
Estimations amount to a worth of over 1 billion dollars of reserves of lead, zinc, silver, manganese, nickel and boron. The reserves of the main mineral resources in Kosovo are calculated to be:

- Lignite: around 13 billion tons
- Lead and zinc: 59 billion tons
- Bauxites: 2.7 billion tons
- Nickel: 13 billion tons
- Magnesium: 4.1 billion tons

A mineral deposit known as Artana is situated at the eastern part of Prishtina, around 18 km from it. Artana is calculated to contain 9 million tons of ore, with an average content of 2.5% Zn (zinc), 2.3% Pb (lead) and 92 ppm Ag (silver). While the three main minerals found in this deposit are lead, zinc and silver, other elements such as cadmium (Cd), bismuth (Bi), gold (Au) etc. are also identified. Lead and zinc are found in Kosovo in the following mines: Stari Trg mine, Crnac mine, Artana mine, Hajvalia, Kizhnica, Badovc etc. Magnesium is found in: Strezovc and Golesh. Limestone mines are: Sharrcem. Chrome is found in Deve. Bauxite is found in Klina. Base metal exports account for a large proportion of total exports, at approximately 63%, and they have continued to increase. From 19 million euros worth of base metal exports in 2004, they increased to 124 million euros in 2008. From 47 million euros in 2007, iron and steel exports increased to 105 million euros in 2008. Following this increase in exports, a decline in demand began by the end of 2008.

==== Lead ====
Kosovo is rich with lead. The Trepça mining complex alone is estimated to possess deposits of lead at 425,000 tons. Lead is produced in Mitrovica, while the mineral reserves for producing lead are found in: Stanterg, Artana, and Kopaonik. These minerals contain rare metals such as: Ag, Au, Bi, Sb, Mn, Cu, Ge, Te, Ta and Se. The reserves are calculated to be worth 41.2 million tons. Lead has a utility coefficient of 95-98% while the production of lead, as it was estimated in 1987 was around 100,000 t of lead per year. The lead produced in Kosovo is utilized in three main industries in Kosovo:

- In Mitrovica, in the Accumulator industry, where 35,000 tons per year are used
- in Peja, in the industrial accumulators, where 12,000 tons per year are used
- in Skenderaj, in the factory for hunting munitions, where 8,500 tons per year were used

While another considerable amount goes to the industries of the former Yugoslavia. The lead concentrate prepared in Mitrovica has the following chemical composition:

- Pb: 73%
- Zn: 0.93%
- Cu: 0.09%
- Fe: 3.10%
- S: 16.4%
- As: 0.14%
- At: 0.18%
- SiO_{2}: 3.3%
- Ag, Cd, Bi, etc.: 1,425 g/t

==== Zinc ====
Kosovo is also rich in zinc which is also produced in Mitrovica. Trepça complex alone is estimated to contain 415,000 tons of zinc. Since the mineral base for zinc is the same as lead, they are usually called lead-zinc minerals. The zinc concentrate is somewhat similar to Lead in components, the chemical structure of zinc produced in Mitrovica is as follows:

- Pb: 0.85%
- Zn: 47.0%
- Fe: 9.12%
- S: 29.52%
- As well as As, Mg, Cd, Ca, Ag, Hg.

About 20,000 tons per year of zinc produced are used in Vushtrri as zinc tin, and about 60,000 tons per year in Gjakovë as zinc in tubes and ropes.

==== Silver, bismuth and cadmium ====
Trepça alone is estimated to contain 800 tons of silver. During 1978–1988, not only was lead produced, but also some quantities of silver, gold, cadmium and bismuth. The quantities produced were: 200 tons Ag (silver) per year, 150 tons Bi (bismuth) per year, 120 kg Au (gold) per year, and 300 tons Cd (cadmium) per year. The processing of such metals has also developed in some regions of Kosovo, such as: processing of gold and silver in Prizren, in amounts of approximately 20 kg Au monthly and 1,000 kg Ag monthly, also the production of nickel-cadmium batteries in Prizren, at about 100 tons Cd per year.

==== Iron, manganese, copper, uranium, titanium, thorium ====
Although there are indications of such sources of minerals, investigations are still ongoing and not determined. Up to know, there have been some sources of iron noticed in the areas of: - Petrashticë-Shtime (44% iron and 2.5% Cr_{2}O_{3}), Tërstenik (40% iron and 3.5% Cr_{2}O_{3}), and Sedllarë (Kamenica, 40% iron). Manganese is usually found accompanying lead and zinc. The regions of Novobërdë, Brod, and Dragash contain manganese resources of economic interest. These reserves contain an average chemical structure of manganese at 22.2% and are estimated to be around 5 million tons. Copper is found in the following locations:

- Pashtrik, at 1.0% copper
- Rahovec, Guri i Kuq, between 1.2 and 2.73% copper
- Rexhanc, Đeneral Janković, concentration undetermined
- and Mountains of Deçani, concentration undetermined.

==== Bauxites ====
The use bauxite in Kosovo started in 1966 and it is now found in the Grebnik Mountain, the reserves of which amount to 1.7 million tons of bauxite. Apart from the bauxite reserves, 2 tons of alumina are found in four tons of bauxite, from which then aluminum is produced. This means that the Grebnik mountain potentially contains 425,000 tons of aluminum. The chemical structure of bauxite in Kosovo is:

- Al_{2}O_{3}: 46 to 52%
- SiO_{2}: 1 to 4.5%
- Fe_{2}O_{3}: 33 to 38%
- TiO_{2}: 1.8 to 2.7%

The mineral masses of bauxite range from thousands to millions of tons, and 20 to 200m. The newest bauxite reserves which are usable amount to 2.7 million tons (of categories A, B and C1), with another 40 million tons of limestone accompanying them. While no capacity for processing bauxite was created in Kosovo, the bauxite produced is mainly exported to several countries such as Germany, Russia and Romania.

==== Chromium ====
In Kosovo, there are only few chromium sources and they are spread in the regions of Brezovica, Gjakova, Luboten, Rahovec and Golesh. Chromium is extracted in Gjakova from Deva mining. The average chromium chemical structure is 44% Cr_{2}O_{3}. Although there are no definite data on the amount of chromium resources in Kosovo, up to 2008 total chromium production was around 102 million tons.

==== Gold ====
Gold in Kosovo is found accompanying copper, lead, and zinc, as well as some clean reserves in alluvial rivers. Gold is found in the Artana mine where its composition is high and it is in measurable levels. Artana is the source with the highest gold content in Kosovo, where deposits are estimated to be approximately 2,700 kg. Gold is also found in lead and zinc ores with an average content of 0.8 grams per ton. It has been calculated that from 1939 up to 1989, gold production in Kosovo amounted to approximately 11.9 tons.

=== Non-metallic materials ===
==== Quartz grit ====
Kosovo possesses quartz grit (SiO_{2}) in its eastern, southern and central part. Quartz grit is a high-quality industrial mineral, and is mainly used for construction materials. Its average chemical structure is:

- SiO_{2}: 95 to 97%
- Al_{2}O_{3}: 0.95 to 2.39%
- Fe_{2}O_{3}: 0.09 to 0.2%
- CaO: 0.81 to 1.21%

Although there are several areas in Kosovo rich in quartz, research on this mineral is not complete. Reserves are calculated to be around 340,000 m^{3}.

==== Magnesium carbonate ====
Several locations in Kosovo contain magnesium carbonate (MgCO_{3}), such as Strezovce and Goleš. The chemical structure of these minerals is:

- MgO: 44.49%
- SiO_{2}: 2.5 to 6%
- CaO: 0.9 to 5%

Prior to 1990, on average, annual production was 110,000 tons of magnesite, 22,000 tons of sintered magnesia and 10,000 tons of caustic calcined magnesia. In total, around 4.6 million tons of this mineral have been used up to now. Total current reserves are: 2.4 million tons in Magure and another 1.7 million tons in Strezovce.

==== Argil ====
Argil in Kosovo is found in several locations, such as: Gjakovë, Dardanë, Landovicë, Skënderaj, Klinë, Pejë, Viti, Ferizaj, Pristina and Podujeva. In total, the argil reserves are assessed to be 2 billion tons. The chemical structure of argil, which is used mainly to produce bricks and tiles is:

- SiO_{2}: 56 to 62%
- Al_{2}O_{3}: 12.6 to 15.2%
- MgO: 2.9 to 3.2%
- CaO: 2.3 to 7%

==== Kaolin, bentonites and cement ====
Kosovo also possesses large reserves of kaolin (rocks rich in kaolinite), one of the largest in Kosovo located in Low Karaçeva, to the east Gjilan. This mine in Low Karaçeva has operated since 1965, and up to now, total kaolin reserves used are approximately 372,000 tons. Overall, Kosovo possesses total kaolin reserves of approximately 15 million m^{3} mainly spread in four fields. Bentonite reserves in Kosovo are assessed to be at a total of 86 million tons, and they are mainly spread in seven mineral fields. Cement reserves in Kosovo are assessed to be at a total of 95 million tons, and they are spread in "Hani i Elezit". Decorative stone, limestone, and grit Kosovo possesses a total of 3 billion tons of marble (black marble, onyx, green marble) and they are mainly found in Deçan and Peja. Limestone reserves are estimated to be around 10 billion tons, while grit found in rivers is estimated to be at 1 billion tons.

=== Fuels ===
==== Lignite ====
Kosovo is mostly rich in lignite and lignite accounts for 97% of electricity generation in Kosovo. Kosovo's reserves of lignite are aligned as fifth in the world, at around 14 Billion tons. The lignite in Kosovo is found in three main basins: Kosovo basin, Dukagjin basin and Drenica basin. The Kosovo basin has so far been the main basin used for mining. Lignite exploitation in Kosovo was first recorded in 1922, in the Kosovo basin, when mining began. Kosovo Basin has a surface area of 274 km^{2}. The Dukagjini basin has a surface area of 49 km^{2}. Other basins encompass a surface area of 5.1 km^{2}.The lignite in Kosovo is low in sulfur content and has a good lime concentration which means it can absorb sulfur during combustion. Overall, the lignite mines in Kosovo have among the most favorable characteristics in Europe. Average stripping ratio of waste to coal is 1.7m^{3} to 1, and it is of high quality for electricity generation. The net calorific value of lignite in Kosovo varies between 6.28 and 9.21 MJ/kg, with an average of 7.8 MJ/kg. The humidity ranges between 38 and 48%, the ash percentage between 9.84 and 21.32%, and sulfur content between 0.64 and 1.51%. Kosovo has the second largest reserves of exploitable lignite in Europe, only after Germany and Poland. Lignite is the major source of energy in Kosovo and will remain to be so due to its high reserves.

There are three main coal basins in Kosovo.

The Kosovo basin has around 12 billion tons of lignite. The coal in the Kosovo basin is of lignite type and its geological age is the Early Pontian P|1.

The Dukagjini basin contains three coal series:

- Mio Pliocene series, (before the Pontian age)
- Early Pliocene series (during the Pontian age)
- Late Pliocene series (during the Levantinian age)

The north of the Dukagjini basin is the most productive.

While the Kosovo basin is located in the east of Kosovo and Dukagjini in the west, the Drenica basin lies in between them with the lowest potential compared to the other two. The Drenica basin consists of two coal-beds: Skenderaj and Drenica.

While the Kosovo and Dukagjini Basin can be exploited for electricity generation, the smaller basin of Drenica cannot be utilised for energy production, although it can be exploited for industrial purposes; thus, it is not of any lower importance.

== Mining and metal industry ==
There are two lead and zinc smelters in Trepča in Mitrovica, which are currently not operating because they were closed down during the UNMIK administration in 2000. They were closed down because of their environmental hazards. There are also several other enterprises which have been privatized after the war, such as: Ferronikeli in 2005, Llamkos Galvasteel in 2005, and Sharrcem in 2000. These enterprises: Ferronikeli in Drenas, a nickel mining and smelting complex; Sharrcem in Han i Elezit, a miner of limestone and manufacturer of cement; and Llamkos Galvasteel in Vushtrri, a manufacturer of steel, were "industrial champions" in the former Yugoslavia. Investments in the mining and metals sector in Kosovo have been very low and even declining during 2007–2011; however, this industry constitutes the largest portion of Kosovo's exports. The mining and metals industry provides almost 76% of the export revenues in Kosovo. This has also contributed to decreasing a portion of the rent-based income in Kosovo and increasing the real-economy income in Kosovo. Nevertheless, there are many structural imbalances in this sector and although it constitutes a high portion of the exports, the industry is also heavily dependent upon imports. The mining and metals industry in Kosovo shows a lack of internal integration, which means that there are few links in the production process between different segments in the industry and there is a need for investments in the field. Also, by establishing new enterprises in the mining and metals sector, Kosovo was able to decrease its current account deficit in 2011 by around 537 million Euros. Although metal processing developed quickly within the mining and metal industry during 2003–2011 and it increased export revenues by 16-fold, it was not able to encourage production linkages within the industry. During 2009–2011 the only mining licenses issued were to existing companies in Kosovo and only 5 were issued for extraction projects. During 2003–2011 imports also increased of ore and ore concentrates which were then processed locally and re-exported. While ores extracted by private companies or at Trepča are exported and further on processed and refined out of Kosovo, the domestic manufacturing industry uses processed metals imported from abroad. Thus, there are no linkages within the metals and mining industry in Kosovo and the industry is fully dependent linked with external economies. The extractive sector, although it is increasing in importance, it still remains at a relatively low level of 1.1% of GDP (2010) and significantly lower than its level prior to the war and the 90s. In 2008, the export of nickel ingots amounted to almost half of the whole exports value. The mining sector contributes relatively low to GDP (approximately 1%). Base metals accounted for almost 33% of all exports in 2010. These figures align Kosovo among the countries which the World Bank evaluates as "mineral economies".

== Institutions in the energy sector ==
The main institutions in the energy sector in Kosovo are: The Ministry of Energy and Mining, the Energy Regulatory Office and the Independent Commission for Mines and Minerals (ICMM), while some of the major enterprises are: the Kosovo energy Corporation (KEK) and the Kosovo Electricity Transmission System and Market Operator (KOSTT).

== See also ==
- Coal in Kosovo
- Economy of Kosovo
- Forests of Kosovo
- Geography of Kosovo
- Trepča Mines
