= Bistrica e Shalës, Kosovo =

Bistrica e Shalës
- Village
- Location in Kosovo
- Coordinates: 43°0′54″N 20°49′30″E
- Location: Kosovo
- District: Mitrovica
- Municipality: Leposaviq
- Elevation: 1,940 ft (590 m)

Population (2024)
  - Total: 86
- Time zone: UTC+1 (CET)
  - Summer (DST): UTC+2 (CEST)
- Area code: +383

Bistrica e Shalës (Albanian: Lumbardhi i Shalës; Serbian: Шаљска Бистрица, romanized: Šaljska Bistrica) is a settlement in the Leposavić municipality in northern Kosovo.

== Name ==
In 1986, the secondary name of Šaljska Bistrica was the Slavicised version "Bistrica e Shalës". The name is linked with the Albanian Shala tribe.

== Geography ==
The village is located 12 km southeast from Leposavić, below the Kopaonik. The settlement lies on both sides of the middle flow of the Bistrica, a right tributary of Ibar. The settlement is of the scattered type (razbijenog tipa), and its cadastral area includes 787 hectares.

== History ==
The village of Bistrica (Бистрица) was mentioned in the 1455 Ottoman defter (tax registry). Serbs were the majority population up until the mid-19th century, when Albanians expelled them and had their Orthodox church destroyed.

The toponym Crkvište is used for the area of the church ruins.

== Demographics ==
The village is inhabited by an ethnic Albanian majority.

== Notable people ==
- Kadri Bistrica, notable Vullnetari commander

== Sources ==
- Kalezić, Dimitrije M. (2002). A - Z. Savremena administracija. p. 197. ISBN 9788638706716.
