= Battle of Belaćevac Mine =

Battle of the Kosovo War

Coordinates: 42°41′24″N 21°04′40″E

- Part of the Kosovo War
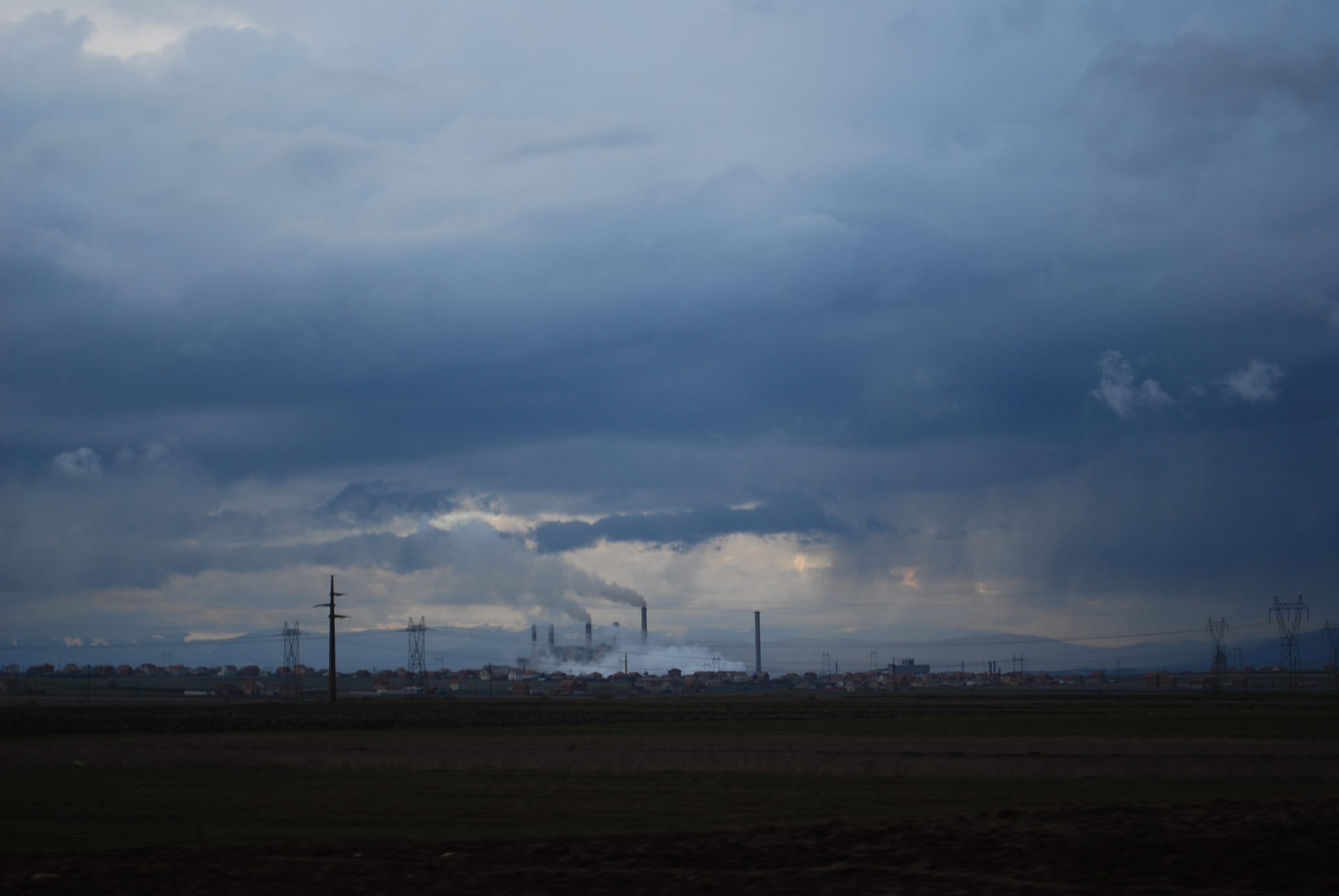
- Power plants outside Obilić in 2009
Date	22 June – 1 July 1998 (1 week and 2 days)
Location	Belaćevac coal mine, Obilić, Yugoslavia
Result	Yugoslav victory

Belligerents
Yugoslavia	Kosovo Liberation Army

Commanders and leaders
(Serbia and Montenegro) Sreten Lukić	Bekim Berisha

Strength
(Serbia and Montenegro) 100	30

Casualties and losses
(Serbia and Montenegro) None	10 killed
- 9 Serb mineworkers abducted, presumed dead 2 Kosovo Albanian civilians killed, 6 wounded and c. 8,000 displaced.

The Battle of Belaćevac Mine (Note: Albanian: Beteja e Bardhit të Madh; Serbo-Croatian: Bitka za Belaćevački rudnik; Cyrillic: Битка за Белаћевачки рудник) was a week-long clash between the Yugoslav Army (VJ), Serbian police (MUP) and the Kosovo Liberation Army (KLA) in June 1998, during the Kosovo War. It was fought over the Belaćevac coal mine, which powered two generating stations that supplied electricity to most of Kosovo.

The KLA seized the mine on 22 June, taking nine Serb mineworkers hostage, converting the mine into a base of operations and taunting the Yugoslav authorities by sending daylight patrols within sight of the provincial capital, Pristina. Over the next seven days, Yugoslav authorities and the KLA negotiated over the fate of the mineworkers. Once negotiations broke down, the VJ and MUP attacked the mine and forced the KLA out. Ten militants were killed in the clashes. The VJ and MUP reported suffering no casualties. Though the mine was recaptured, the hostages were nowhere to be found, and it is presumed they were killed by the militants. As of June 2014, the location of the mineworkers' remains is unknown. No one has ever been convicted of their deaths.

== Background ==
Following World War II, Kosovo was given the status of an autonomous province within the Socialist Republic of Serbia, one of six constitutional republics of the Socialist Federal Republic of Yugoslavia. After the death of Yugoslavia's long-time leader (Josip Broz Tito) in 1980, Yugoslavia's political system began to unravel. In 1989, Belgrade revoked Kosovo's autonomy. Kosovo, a province inhabited predominantly by ethnic Albanians, was of great historical and cultural significance to Serbs, who had formed a majority there before the mid-19th century, but by 1990 represented only about 10 percent of the population. Alarmed by their dwindling numbers, the province's Serbs began to fear that they were being "squeezed out" by the Albanians, and ethnic tensions worsened. As soon as Kosovo's autonomy was abolished, a minority government run by Serbs and Montenegrins was appointed by Serbian President Slobodan Milošević to oversee the province, enforced by thousands of heavily armed paramilitaries from Serbia-proper. Albanian culture was systematically repressed and hundreds of thousands of Albanians working in state-owned companies lost their jobs.

In 1996, a group of Albanian nationalists calling themselves the Kosovo Liberation Army (KLA) began attacking the Yugoslav Army (Serbo-Croatian: Vojska Jugoslavije; VJ) and the Serbian Ministry of Internal Affairs (Serbo-Croatian: Ministarstvo unutrašnjih poslova; MUP) in Kosovo. Their goal was to separate the province from the rest of Yugoslavia, which following the separation of Slovenia, Croatia, Macedonia and Bosnia-Herzegovina in 1991–92, was just a rump federation consisting of Serbia and Montenegro. At first, the KLA carried out hit-and-run attacks (31 in 1996, 55 in 1997, and 66 in January and February 1998 alone). It quickly gained popularity among young Kosovo Albanians, many of whom rejected the non-violent resistance to Yugoslav authorities advocated by the politician Ibrahim Rugova and favoured a more aggressive approach. The organization received a significant boost in 1997, when an armed uprising in neighbouring Albania led to thousands of weapons from the Albanian Army's depots being looted. Many of these weapons ended up in the hands of the KLA. The KLA also received substantial funds from its involvement in the drug trade.

The KLA's popularity skyrocketed after the VJ and MUP attacked the compound of KLA leader Adem Jashari in March 1998, killing him, his closest associates and most of his family. The attack prompted thousands of young Kosovo Albanians to join the ranks of the KLA, fueling the Kosovar uprising that eventually erupted in the spring of 1998.

== Battle ==
On 22 June 1998, the KLA seized the Belaćevac open-pit coal mine near the town of Obilić. Located about 10 kilometres (6.2 mi) west of the Kosovan capital, Pristina, Belaćevac was strategically important because it supplied coal to two of Kosovo's most important power plants, which in turn provided electricity to most of the province. The attack represented the most serious challenge to the Yugoslav establishment since fighting erupted earlier in the year, not only because of the mine's strategic significance but also because of its close proximity to Pristina. Upon entering the mine, the militants took a number of Serb mineworkers hostage, halting production. Human Rights Watch identified the nine captives as Dušan Ađančić, Pero Ađančić, Zoran Ađančić, Mirko Buha, Filip Gojković, Božidar Lempić, Srboljub Savić, Mirko Trifunović and Dragan Vukmirović. Some of the militants were armed with automatic weapons, but most carried hunting rifles. There were about 30 fighters in all, most wearing civilian clothes. "Some of the guerrillas were no more than boys with single-shot rifles," wrote journalist Jeffrey Fleishman. "Others were brawny men with handlebar mustaches, ammunition belts and bayonets." Fleishman described them as "jittery and weary", and noted that they did not even have walkie-talkies.

The KLA taunted the authorities by sending daylight patrols within sight of Pristina. The fighters set up roadblocks, checkpoints and anti-sniper screens. Their heaviest weapons were two rocket-propelled grenade launchers and a 12.7 mm (0.50 in) machine gun. They forced the mineworkers to dig trenches separating the KLA from Yugoslav positions. Soon after the mine was taken, Yugoslav authorities entered into negotiations with the KLA over the fate of the hostages. The Yugoslavs also erected roadblocks of their own, closed off the road leading to Belaćevac, and surrounded the mine with snipers. About 100 VJ personnel were involved in the battle.

Negotiations between the authorities and the KLA over the fate of the hostages apparently broke down just prior to the Yugoslav counterattack. Backed by armoured vehicles, artillery and a number of tanks, hundreds of VJ and MUP personnel moved to recapture Belaćevac beginning on 29 June. By the first day, Yugoslav forces had advanced to within 600 feet (180 m) of the mine. Yugoslav officials explained that the VJ and MUP were deliberately advancing slowly in order to avoid taking casualties, and alleged that the militants were using the mineworkers as human shields. One group of militants soon completely withdrew from Belaćevac, while another barricaded itself inside the mine's management building and workshops. By 1 July, the mine was back in Yugoslav hands. The VJ and MUP apparently used tear gas to dislodge the militants from their positions. The town and its vicinity were largely abandoned by both Albanians and Serbs, and by fighting's end, more than 8,000 civilians had been displaced.

== Aftermath ==
The battle resulted in the deaths of 10 KLA militants. The Yugoslavs reported suffering no casualties. The KLA claimed two Kosovo Albanian civilians—an eight-year-old boy and a man—were killed in the clashes, and six injured. Yugoslav authorities confirmed that an eight-year-old boy had been killed in shelling near the town. By 1 July, the mine was reportedly back in operation. The same day, Western journalists attempting to enter Belaćevac were attacked by a mob of angry Serb civilians.

Upon re-entering the mine, Yugoslav authorities found that the hostages had vanished, apparently taken by the group of KLA fighters that had retreated from Belaćevac prior to its capture. They are thought to have been executed by the militants. Their families have since set up an organization dedicated to bringing the kidnappers to justice, and if possible, locating the missing mineworkers' remains. The mineworkers' whereabouts are unknown as of June 2014, as is the location of their remains. No one has been convicted of their deaths.
