= Sllatina, Vushtrri =

Sllatinë: Sllatinë (Albanian); Слатина/Slatina (Serbian)
- Village
- Location within Kosovo
- Coordinates: 42°51′11″N 20°58′10″E
- Location: Kosovo
- District: Mitrovicë
- Municipality: Vushtrri

Population (2011)
  - Total: ▲491
- Time zone: UTC+1 (CET)
  - Summer (DST): UTC+2 (CEST)

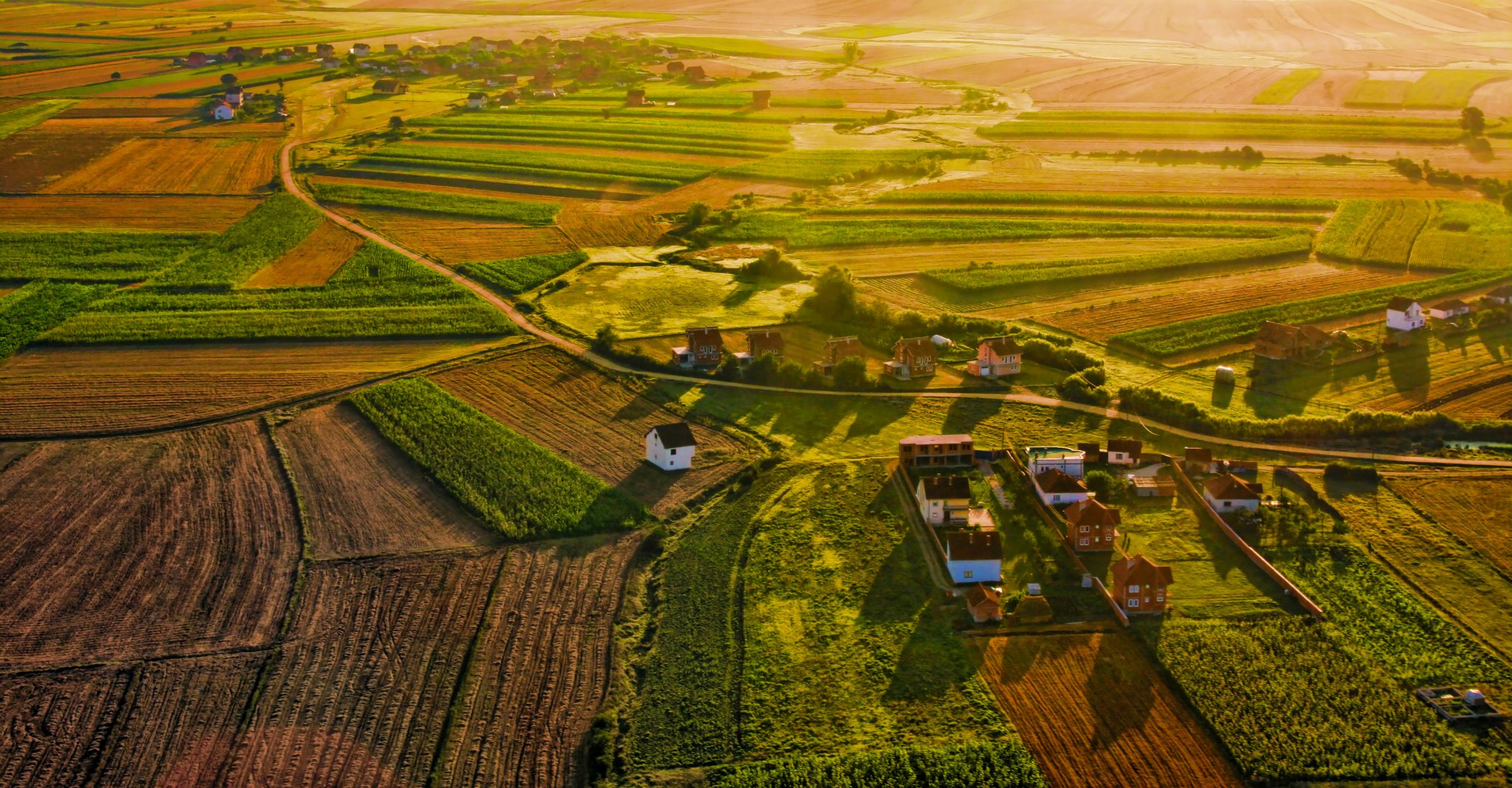
Sllatinë

Sllatinë or Slatina (Serbian Cyrillic : Слатина) is a village in Kosovo located in the municipality of Vushtrri and in the district of Mitrovicë. According to the Kosovo census of 2011, it has 491 inhabitants, all of whom are Albanians.

== History ==
The village is mentioned for the first time in the Ottoman defter of district of Branković 1455, with 18 houses, including the house of the priest Bogdan.

During World War II, Sllatina along with the village of Ceranja would have a high Chetnik presence. In 1941, Albanian irregulars, mostly from the Tribe of Shala, would drive them out of the two villages.

== Demographics ==
Historical population

Year	Pop.	±%
1948	142	—
1953	250	+76.1%
1961	284	+13.6%
1971	341	+20.1%

Year	Pop.	±%
1981	409	+19.9%
1991	411	+0.5%
2011	491	+19.5%

== See also ==
- List of populated places in Kosovo
