= Košutovo, Leposavić =

Košutovo Koshutovë
- Village
- Location within Kosovo
- Location: Kosovo
- District: Mitrovica
- Municipality: Leposavić
- Elevation: 2,408 ft (734 m)

Population (2024)
  - Total: 42
- Time zone: UTC+1 (CET)
  - Summer (DST): UTC+2 (CEST)
- Area code: +383

Košutovo (Serbian Cyrillic: Кошутово) or Koshutovë (Albanian definite form: Koshutova), is a village in Leposavić, northern Kosovo. It is inhabited by an ethnic Albanian majority. It is part of the region known as Shala e Bajgorës.

== Notable people ==
- Kosovare Asllani, Swedish professional football player
