= Sibovc Coal Mine =

Open-pit coal mine in Kosovo

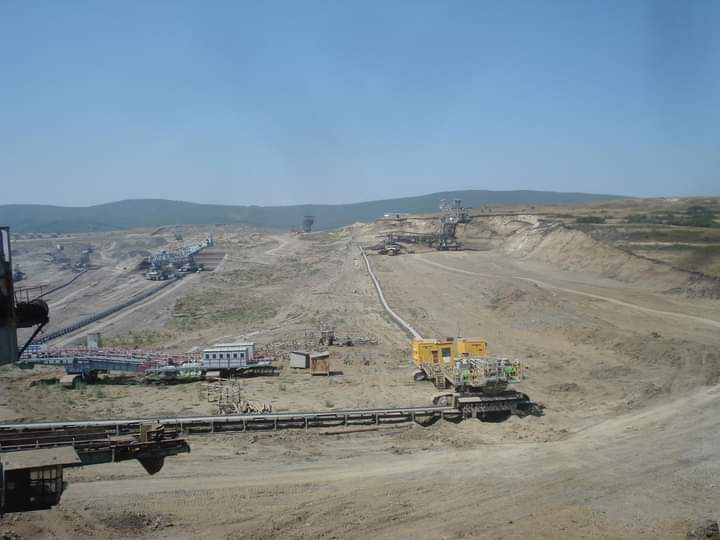
- View on Sibovc coal mine, January 2022

- Location within Kosovo
- Location: Obiliq, District of Pristina, Kosovo; 42°39′41″N 21°00′36″E
- Products: Coal mining
- Production: 8.07 million tonnes of coal (2024)
- Company: Kosovo Energy Corporation (KEK)

The Sibovc Coal Mine is an open-pit coal mine located near Obiliq, District of Pristina, Kosovo. It is operated by Kosovo Energy Corporation (KEK), and has produced 8.07 million tones of coal (as of 2024).

The most of its coal is used for the electricity generation at Kosovo A Power Station and Kosovo B Power Station. The mine has coal reserves amounting to 1 billion tonnes of lignite, one of the largest lignite reserves in Europe.

== See also ==
- Coal in Kosovo
- Natural resources of Kosovo
