= Crnac mine =

Mine in Kosovo

- Location within Kosovo
- Location: Leposavić, Mitrovica District, Kosovo; 43°4′58.8″N 20°41′34.8″E
- Products: Lead, zinc, silver
- Company: Trepca Kosovo

The Crnac mine is one of the largest lead and zinc mines in Kosovo. The mine is located in Leposavić. The mine has reserves amounting to 1.648 million tonnes of ore grading 7.57% lead, 2.93% zinc and 102gr/t silver thus resulting 125,000 tonnes of lead, 48,300 tonnes of zinc and 168 tonnes of silver.
