= Leposavić =

Leposavić: Leposaviq or Leposaviqi (Albanian) Leposavić or Лепосавић (Serbian)
- Town and municipality
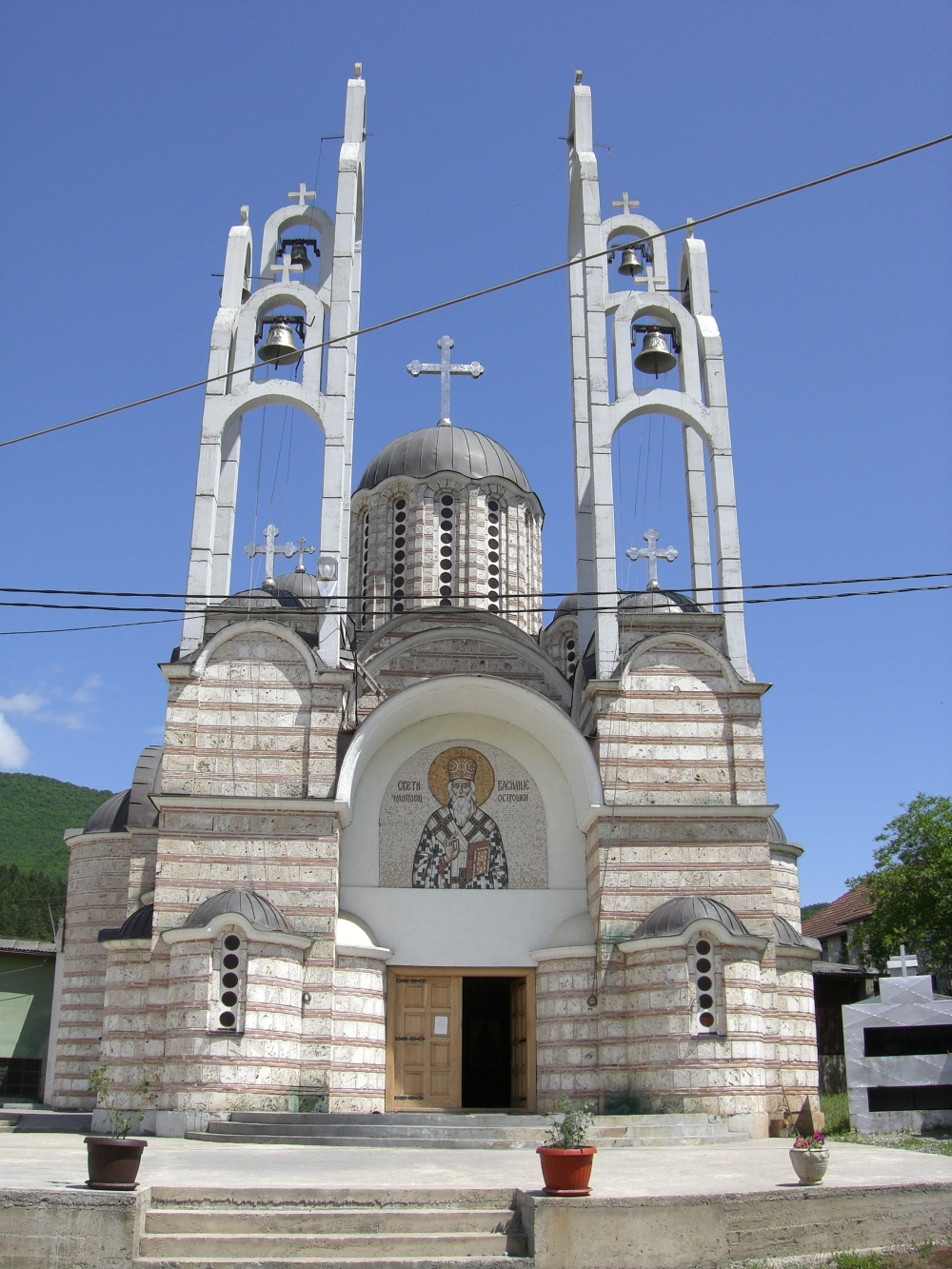
- Church in Leposavić

- Emblem
- Interactive map of Leposavić
- Location within Kosovo
- Coordinates: 43°06′N 20°48′E
- Country: Kosovo
- District: Mitrovica
- Settlements: 73

Government
  - Mayor: Zoran Todic (SL)

Area
  - Total: 539 km^{2} (208 sq mi)
  - Rank: 5th in Kosovo
- Elevation: 450 m (1,480 ft)

Population (2015)
  - Total: 18,600
  - Density: 34.5/km^{2} (89.4/sq mi)
- est.
- Time zone: UTC+1 (CET)
  - Summer (DST): UTC+2 (CEST)
- Postal code: 43500
- Area code: +383(0)28
- Vehicle registration: 02
- Climate: Cfb
- Website: Official site

Leposavić (Serbian Cyrillic: Лепосавић, pronounced [lɛ̌pɔsaʋitɕ]), also known as Leposaviq or Albanik (Albanian definite form: Leposaviqi or Albaniku), is a town and the northernmost municipality in the Mitrovica District in Kosovo. As of 2015, it has an estimated population of 18,600 inhabitants. The municipality covers an area of 539 km^{2} (208 sq mi) which makes it the fifth largest in Kosovo, and consists of the town and 72 villages.

It is a part of North Kosovo, a region with an ethnic Serb majority.

== Name ==
Although historically known as Leposavić in Serbian and Leposaviq in Albanian and being an area of primarily Serbian settlement, the town has been referred to as Albanik on some maps produced by KFOR since Kosovo's declaration of independence. Albanik is preferred over Leposaviq in Kosovar governmental documents translated into English.

== History ==
From 1877 to 1913 Leposavić was part of Kosovo vilayet. Leposavić, then a village, was the scene of fighting during the Serbian–Turkish Wars from 1876-1878.

=== Yugoslavia (1918–92) ===
After the First Balkan War (1912), Kosovo was internationally recognised as a part of Serbia and northern Metohija as a part of Montenegro at the Treaty of London in May 1913. In 1918, the Kingdom of Serbs, Croats and Slovenes, later named Yugoslavia was established by the merging of the Western South Slavic states. Between 1929 and 1941, the region was administratively part of the Zeta Banovina.

Lešak, Belo Brdo, Vračevo, Berberište were incorporated into the Leposavić municipality in 1953.

In the mid–1950s, the Assembly of PR Serbia decided that the Leposavić municipality be ceded to Autonomous Region of Kosovo and Metohija, after requests by the Kosovo leadership. It had up until then been part of the Kraljevo srez, of which the population was wholly Serb. After this, the number of Serbs drastically fell. In 1959, Leposavić was incorporated into the province.

=== Modern ===
After the NATO bombing of Yugoslavia, the political group Pokret za Leposavić ("Movement for Leposavić") was established, which sought to bring together those committed to cooperation and communication with the international community and the Albanians.

== Settlements ==
Aside from the town of Leposavić, the municipality includes the following villages:

- Bare
- Belo Brdo
- Beluće
- Berberište
- Bistrica
- Bistrica e Shalës
- Borova
- Borčane
- Brzance
- Cerajë
- Crveni
- Crnatovo
- Ćirkoviće
- Desetak
- Dobrava
- Donje Isevo
- Donji Krnjin
- Dren
- Duboka
- Gnježdane
- Gornji Krnjin
- Graničane
- Grkaje
- Guvnište
- Gulije
- Ibarsko Postenje
- Jarinje
- Jelakce
- Jošanica
- Kajkovo
- Kamenica
- Kijevčiće
- Koporiće
- Kostin Potok
- Košutica
- Košutovo
- Kruševo
- Kruščica
- Kutnje
- Lazine
- Leshak
- Lozno
- Majdevo
- Mekiniće
- Miokoviće
- Mioliće
- Mošnica
- Ostraće
- Plakaonica
- Planinica
- Popovce
- Potkomlje
- Pridvorica
- Rvatska
- Rodelj
- Rucmance
- Seoce
- Slatina
- Sočanica
- Tvrđan
- Trebiće
- Trikose
- Ulije
- Vitanoviće
- Vračevo
- Vuča
- Zabrđe
- Zavrata
- Zemanica
- Zrnosek

== Demographics ==
Municipal historical population
Year	Pop.	±% p.a.
1948	14,949	—
1953	17,015	+2.62%
1961	19,006	+1.39%
1971	18,044	−0.52%
1981	16,906	−0.65%
1991	16,395	−0.31%
2011	13,773	−0.87%
Source: Division of Kosovo

According to the 2011 estimations by the Government of Kosovo, Leposavić has 4,193 households and 13,773 inhabitants. In 2015 report by OSCE, the population of Leposavić municipality stands at 18,600 inhabitants. The municipality of Leposavić includes the town and 72 villages.

=== Ethnic groups ===
The majority of Leposavić municipality is composed of Kosovo Serbs with around 18,000 inhabitants (96.4%), while 350 Bosniaks and 270 Kosovo Albanians live in the municipality. Kosovo Albanians live in the three southern villages of Bistrica e Shalës, Cerajë, and Koshutova.

The ethnic composition of the municipality of Leposavić, including IDPs:

Ethnic group	1991 est.	1999 est.	2015 est.
Serbs	14,306	15,365	17,935
Bosniaks	600	940	350
Albanians	1,101	902	270
Romani, Ashkali	163	-	65
Others	100	-	-
Total	16,291	17,207	18,600

== Economy ==
The municipality's economy mostly depends on agriculture and small trade businesses.

There are three lead and zinc mines operating on the territory of Leposavić: Belo Brdo, Crepulje and Crnac.

The NGO Caritas Kosovo maintains a regional office in Leposavić.

== Cultural monuments ==
The municipality has several monuments protected by the Republic of Serbia as part of the cultural heritage list.

The following Serbian Orthodox churches are located in Leposavić:

- Sočanica Monastery
- Vračevo Monastery
- Church of Cosmas and Damian
- Church of St. Basil of Ostrog

== Gallery ==
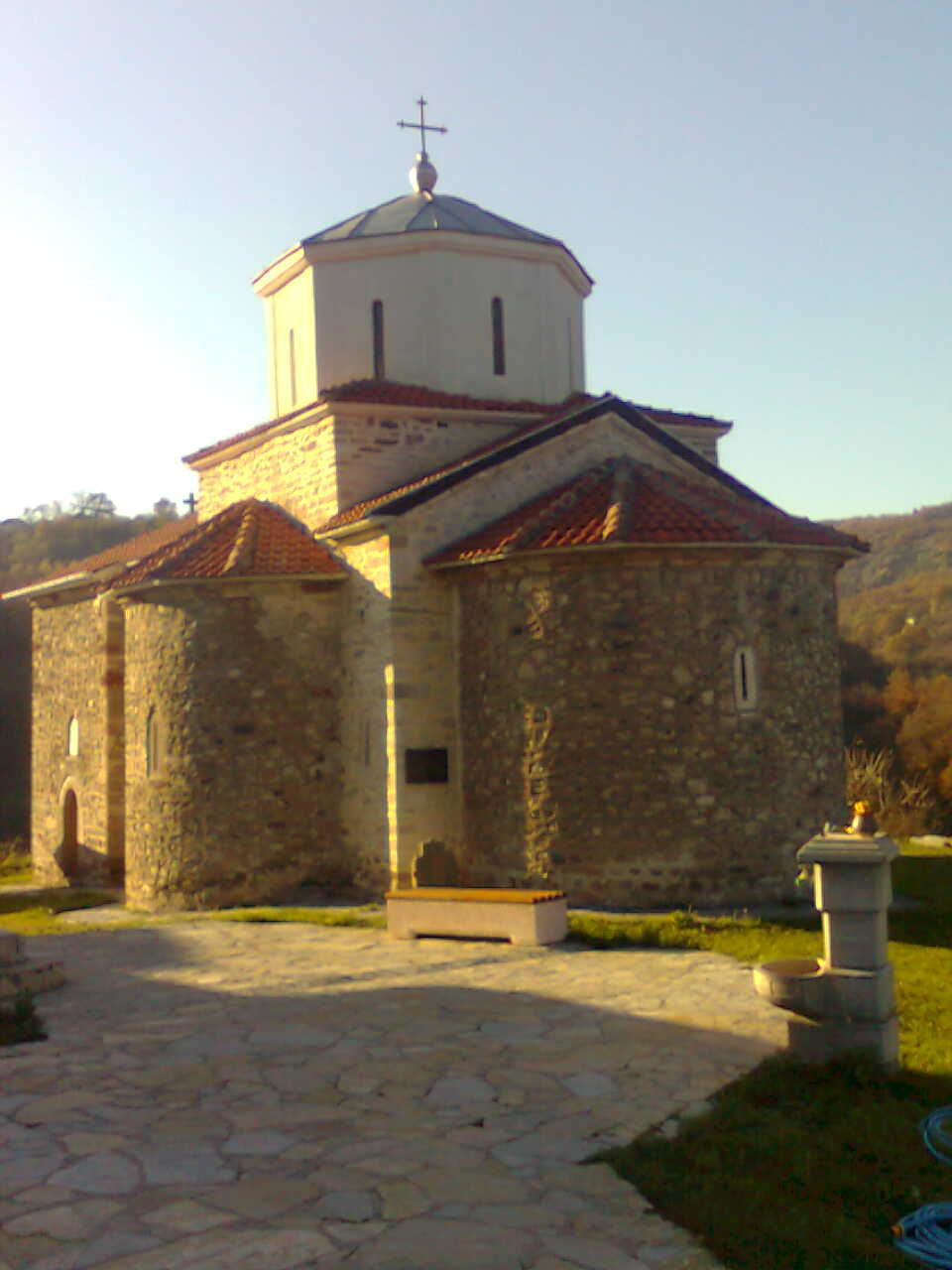
Church of Cosmas and Damian

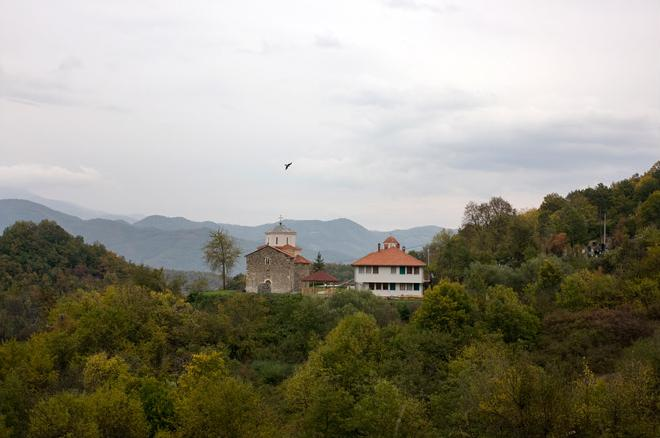
Monastery of Vračevo

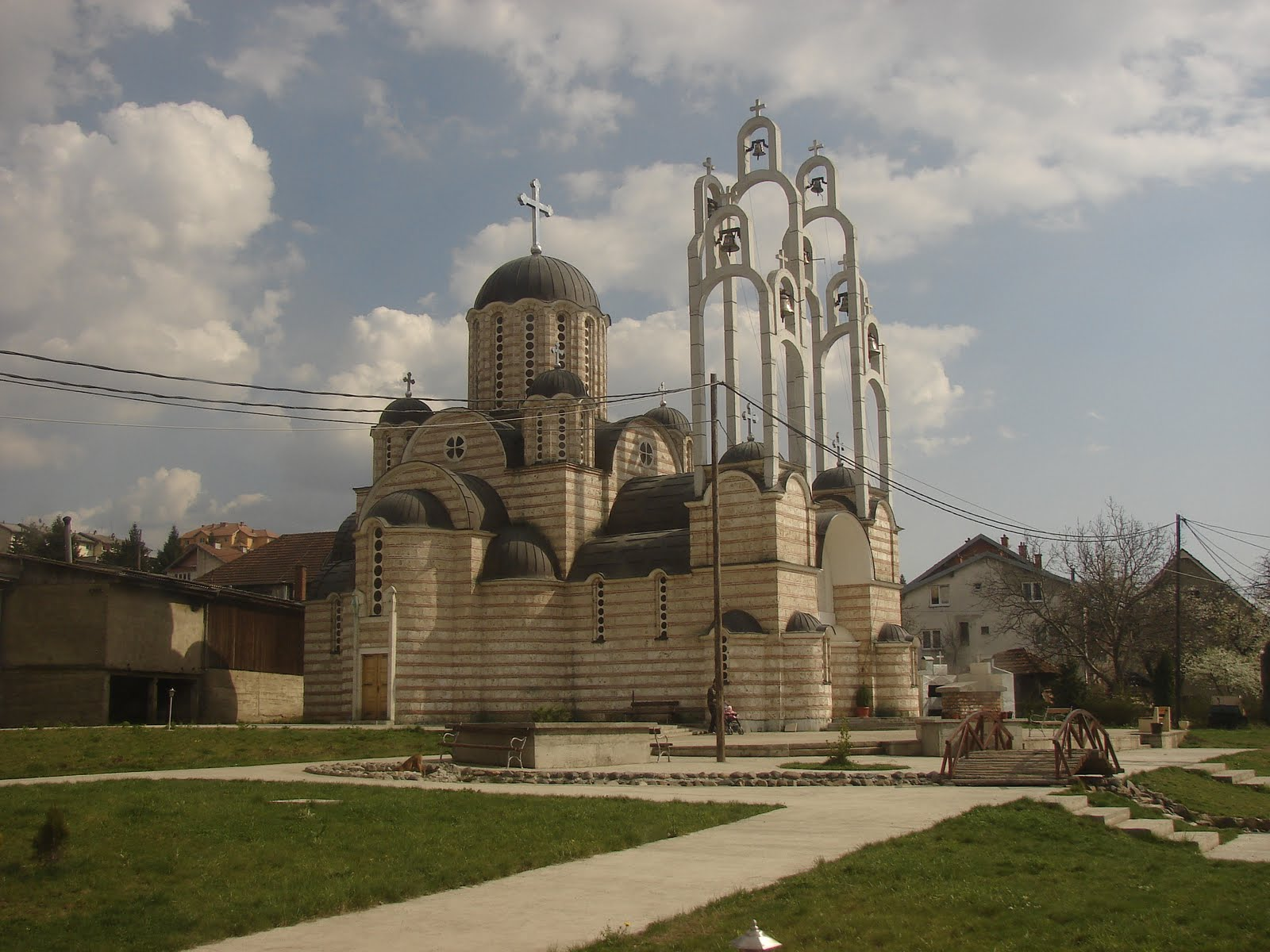
Church of St. Basil of Ostrog

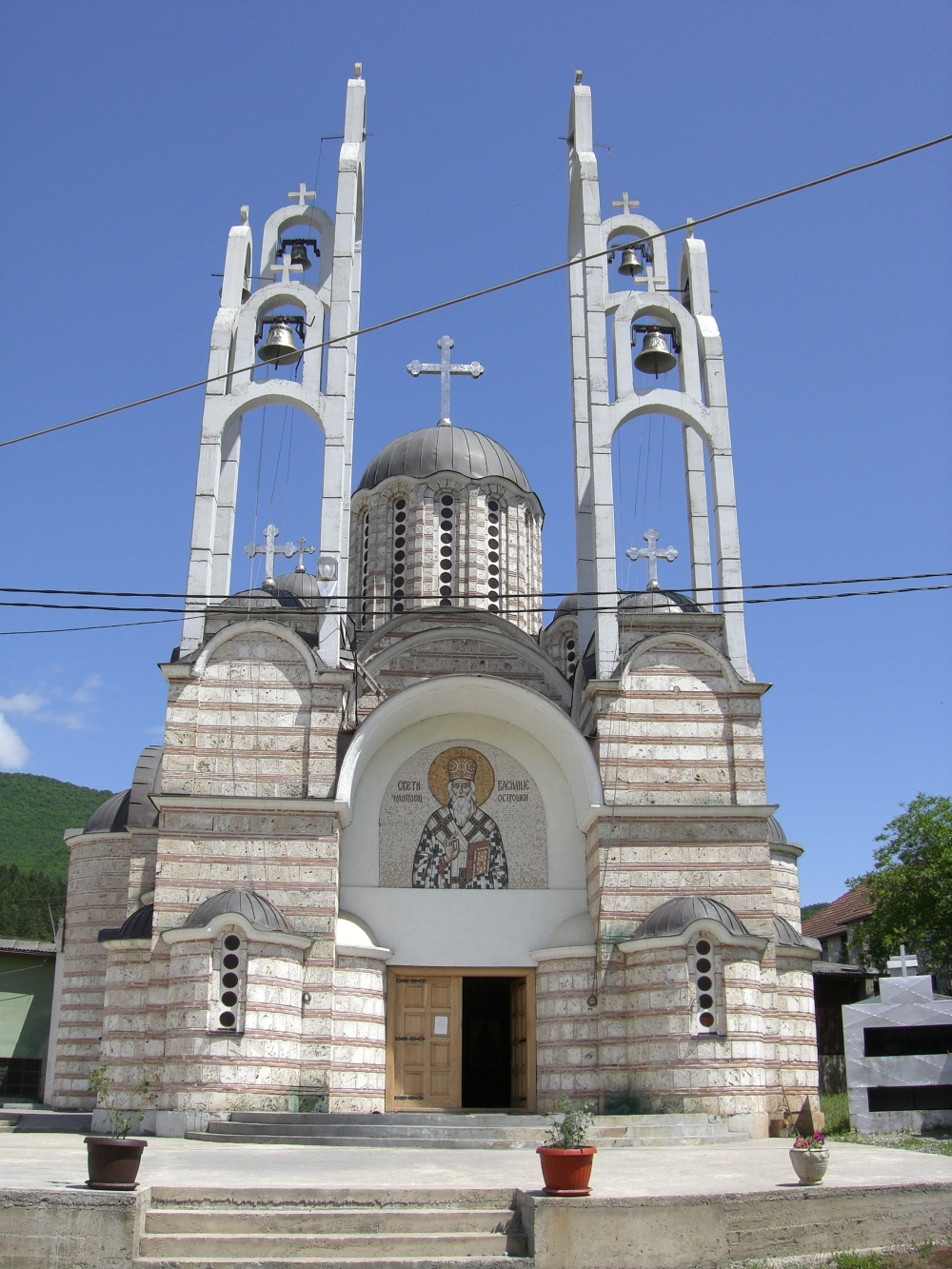
Church of St. Basil of Ostrog

== See also ==
- North Kosovo
- Community of Serb Municipalities
- District of Mitrovica
- Kosovska Mitrovica District

== Sources ==
- Благоје Павловић (2003). Насеља и миграције становништва општине Лепосавић. Институт за српску културу Приштина.
- Milka Stojanovic (2009). ИБАРСКИ Колашин - природа и традицијска култура: зборник радова. Centar za Naučna Istraživanja SANU i Univ. u Kragujevcu. ISBN 978-86-81037-24-9.
- Милисав В Лутовац (1954). Ибарски Колашин: антропогеографска испитивања. Издавачко Предузеђе Народне Републике Србије.
