= Strezovce mine =

Magnesite mine in Kosovo Polje, Pristina district, Kosovo

- Location: Kosovo Polje, Pristina district, Kosovo
- Products: Magnesite, Silica
- Company: Ferronikeli

The Strezovce mine (Serbian Cyrillic: Рудник Стрезовце, Albanian: Strezovc) is one of the largest magnesite mines in Kosovo. The mine is located in Kosovo Polje in Pristina district. The mine has reserves amounting to 3.66 million tonnes of ore grading 40.49% magnesite and 9.29% silica thus resulting 1,482,000 tonnes of magnesite and 340,000 tonnes of silica.
