= Belaćevac coal mine =

Depleted open-pit coal mine in Kosovo

Bardhi i Madh Coal Mine Belaćevac Coal Mine
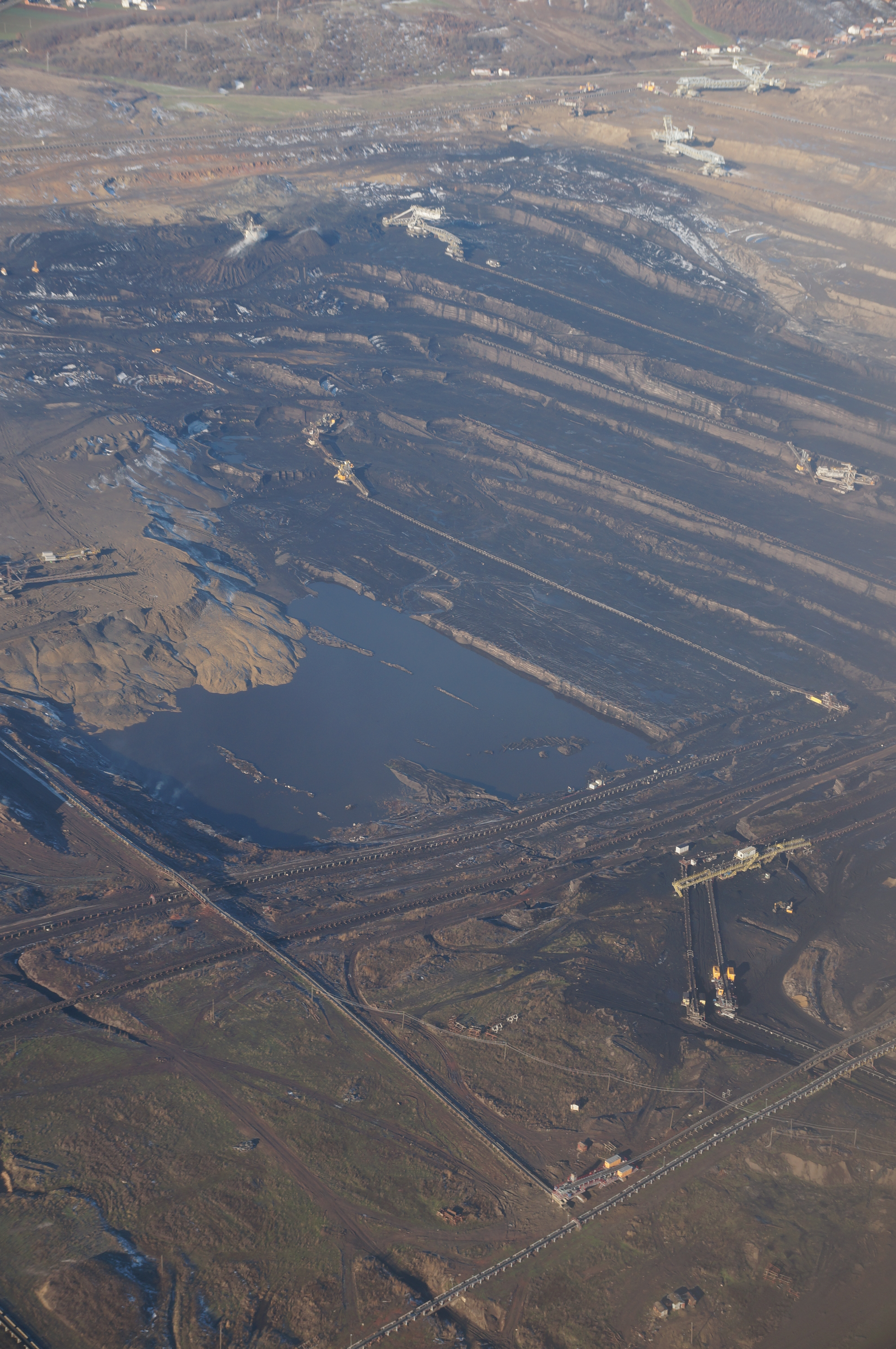
- Aerial view of the mine, December 2017

- Location within Kosovo
- Location: Obiliq, District of Pristina, Kosovo; 42.6498°N 21.0202°E
- Products: Lignite

The Bardhi i Madh coal mine, or Belaćevac Coal Mine, is a depleted coal mine located near Obiliq, District of Pristina, Kosovo.

The mine has coal reserves amounting to 5.92 billion tonnes of lignite, one of the largest lignite reserves in Europe. While it was active, it was producing 6.2 million tonnes of coal per year.

== History ==
During the Kosovo War, there were clashes in the mine between the Kosovo Liberation Army (KLA) and Yugoslav forces. The KLA seized control of the mine on 22 June 1998, but were forced out of the mine by Serbian troops on 1 July.

The mine produced was primarily used as a fuel for the electricity generation at the thermal power station Kosovo B Power Station. Along with Miraš open-cast coal mine, the mine was closed during the 2010-s when Sibovc Coal Mine (southwest field) began expanding and increasing the production levels.
