= Obiliq =

Town in Kosovo

Obiliq: Obiliq or Kastriot (Albanian) Obilić or Обилић (Serbian)
- Town and municipality
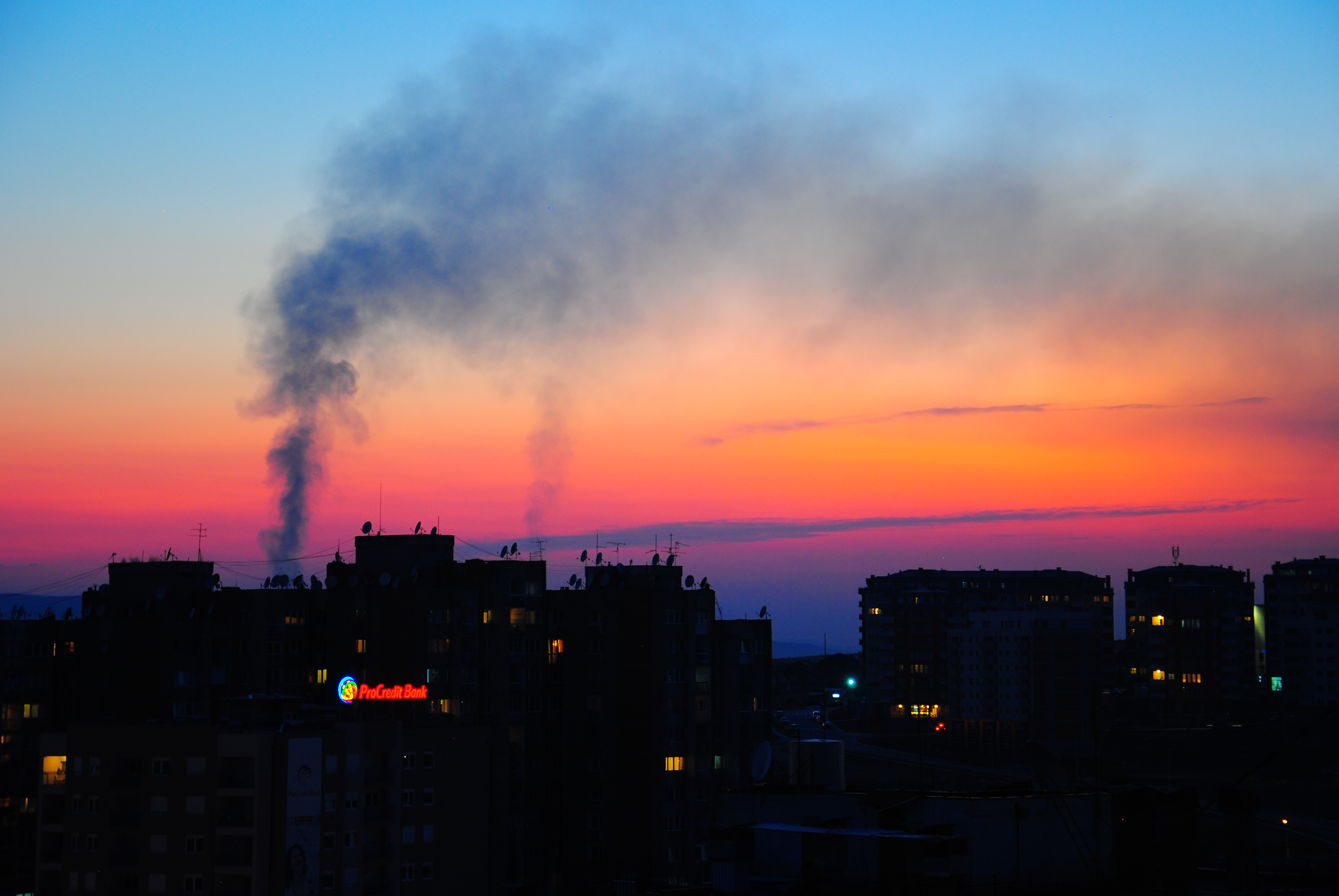

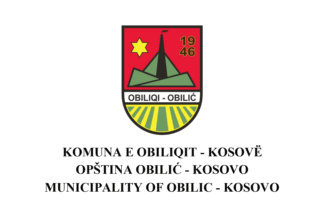
- Flag Seal
- Interactive map of Obiliq
- Location within Kosovo
- Coordinates: 42°41′24″N 21°4′40″E
- Country: Kosovo
- District: Pristina
- Municipality: Obiliq

Government
  - Type: Mayor–council
  - Mayor: Halil Thaçi (LVV)
  - Council: Obiliq Municipal Council

Area
  - Municipality: 104.84 km^{2} (40.48 sq mi)
- Elevation: 530 m (1,740 ft)

Population (2024)
  - Municipality: 22,815
  - Density: 217.62/km^{2} (563.63/sq mi)
  - Urban: 7,634
- Time zone: UTC+1 (CET)
  - Summer (DST): UTC+2 (CEST)
- Postal code: 15000
- Area code: +383 (0) 38
- Vehicle registration: 01
- Website: kk.rks-gov.net/obiliq/

Obiliq or Kastriot (pronounced [kasˈɾioti]) or Obilić (Serbian Cyrillic: Обилић, pronounced [ˈobilitɕ]), is a town and municipality in Kosovo. According to the Kosovo Agency of Statistics (KAS) estimate from the 2024 census, there were 22,794 people residing in Obilic Municipality, with Kosovo Albanians constituting the majority of the population.

== Name ==
Prior to the Balkan Wars, the settlement was known as Globoderica (Глободерица).

Following the conflict, the settlement was incorporated into Serbia and renamed Obilić as part of the efforts to reunite Serbian lands in the early twentieth century when inhabited places within Kosovo were named after heroes from Serbian epic poetry. The placename Obilić refers to the Serbian national hero Miloš Obilić who killed the Ottoman Sultan Murad I at the Battle of Kosovo (1389).

In Albanian, the town is known as Obiliq (a transliteration of the Serbian name), while an alternative name (used by Albanians) was coined by the Albanological Institute, Kastriot, after Albanian national hero Gjergj Kastrioti Skanderbeg (1405–1468).

== Geography ==
Situated on the edge of the Kosovo field, Obiliq municipality rests 10 km northwest of Pristina. It has a good geographical position and is bordered by five other municipalities which are Pristina, Fushë Kosova, Drenas, Vushtrri and Podujevë.

The municipality's peak elevation is at the village of Kozaricë, reaching 740 meters above sea level, while its lowest point is at the bridge connecting the village of Cërkvena Vodicë and the city of Obiliq, situated at 530 meters above sea level.

=== Hydrology ===
In the territory of the municipality, there are three natural rivers: Sitnica, Drenica and Llapi. There's also a man-made canal called the Ibër - Lepenc Canal, which starts from the Ujman reservoir, fed by the Ibër river.

== Economy ==
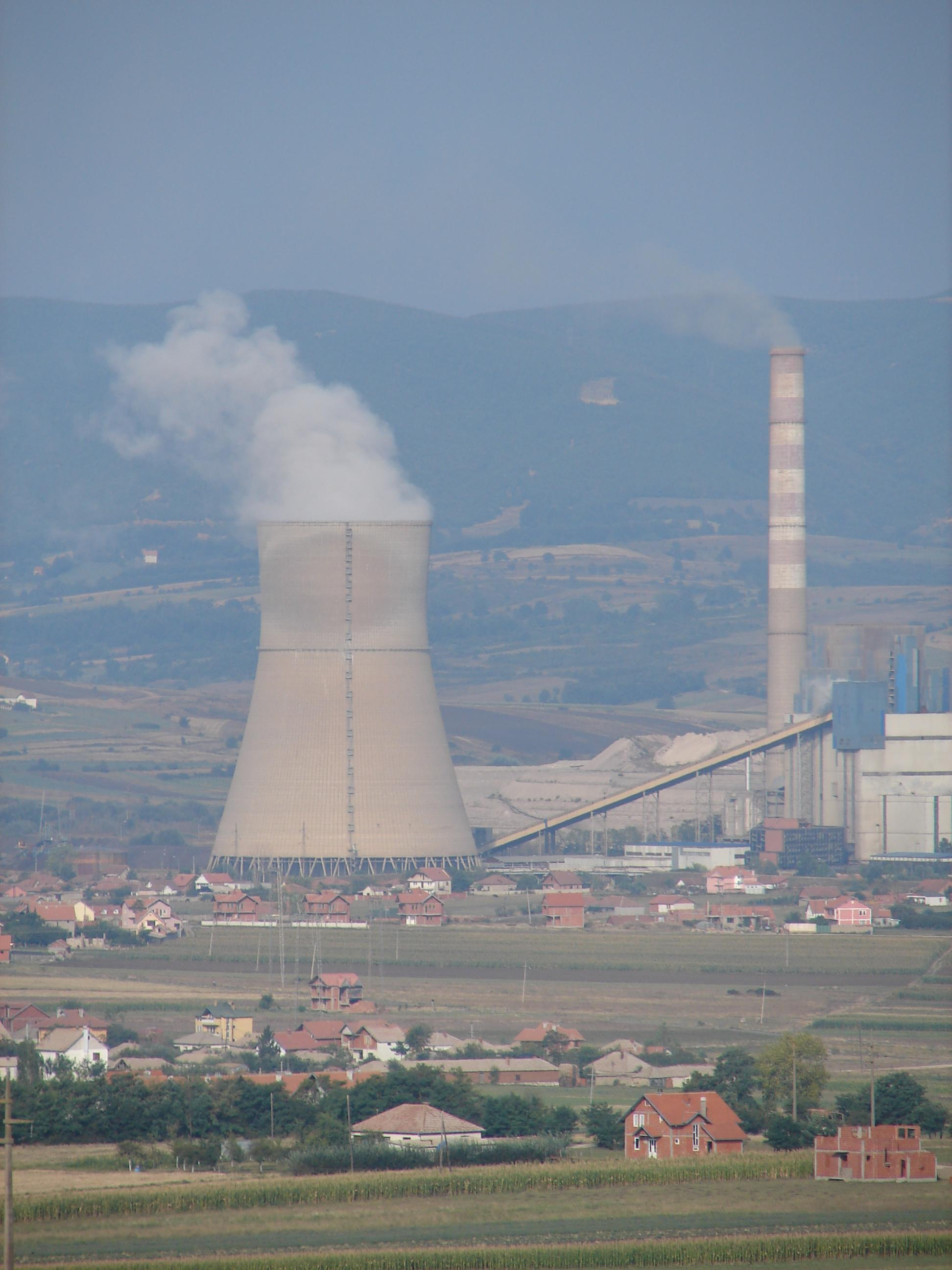
Kosova B Power Station, a 680 MW coal-fired power plant, is one of the two coal-fired power plants in Obiliq.

Two coal-fired power stations, Kosova A and Kosova B, are located in Obiliq that use the coal from three coal mines (Belaćevac, Miraš and Sibovc) operating on the territory of the municipality.

== Demography ==
Municipal historical population
Year	Pop.	±% p.a.
1948	9,228	—
1953	10,971	+3.52%
1961	14,899	+3.90%
1971	21,188	+3.58%
1981	26,595	+2.30%
1991	31,627	+1.75%
2011	21,549	−1.90%
2024	22,794	+0.43%
Source: Division of Kosovo

According to the Kosovo Agency of Statistics 2024 census, the municipality had a population of 22,815 inhabitants. The population of the urban area is 7,634.

In terms of ethnicity, 19,854 (92.13%) are Albanians while other ethnicities include Roma (3.07%), Ashkali (2.68%), Serbs (1.28%), Bosniaks (0.22%) and Gorani (0.4%) . By religion, 98.68% are Muslims.
