= Ethem Çeku =

Kosovo Albanian soldier and politician

Ethem Çeku (born 1962) is a historian and former soldier and politician in Kosovo. He was an officer in the Kosovo Liberation Army (KLA) in the 1998–99 Kosovo War and a minister in the government of Kosovo from 2002 to 2008. Çeku is a member of the Alliance for the Future of Kosovo (AAK).

He is a cousin of former Kosovan prime minister Agim Çeku.

== Kosovo War ==
Çeku was a commander of the Kosovo Liberation Army in the area of Peja during the Kosovo War. After the end of the war in June 1999, he brought reporters to what he said was a torture chamber operated by Serbian police in the city. He said that 395 ethnic Albanians had been brought to a jail next to the police station in the final three months of the war and that their current whereabouts were unknown.

== Politician ==
=== Interim leader of Peja (1999–2000) ===
At the end of the Kosovo War, the Kosovo Liberation Army appointed Çeku as interim mayor of Peja. He continued to wear his combat fatigues to work and carried an AK-47, despite demands from international forces that the KLA disarm.

In response to an attack on a Serbian Orthodox church in Peja in July 1999, Çeku said, "I feel very sorry about that church, and we're all for preserving the old buildings. But we're very allergic to churches built since 1990. They are churches of politics, not churches of religion."

Çeku met with United Nations Secretary-General Kofi Annan during the latter's visit to the province in October 1999.

The United Nations Interim Administration Mission in Kosovo (UNMIK) appointed Jose Manuel Sucre as municipal administrator of Peja later in 1999, and Çeku was reassigned as chairman of the Peja municipal council. In May 2000, Çeku signed a statement on behalf of the council that there was not yet any possibility of allowing Serb refugees to return to the area. He attended talks in Washington, D.C., in July 2000; the talks did not deal with the status of Kosovo but rather with ending the ongoing violence between the Serb and Albanian communities and creating conditions for democratic institutions.

The Peja region was threatened by serious forest fires in August 2000, and Çeku was described as deploying all of the forces of the municipality to prevent an environmental catastrophe.

Çeku appeared in the second position on the Alliance for the Future of Kosovo's electoral list for Peja in the 2000 Kosovan local elections and placed first among the party's candidates, winning election to the local assembly. The Democratic League of Kosovo (LDK) won a majority victory in the city, and his term as council leader came to an end.

=== Cabinet minister (2002–08) ===
==== Minister of Environment and Urban Planning (2002–04) ====
Çeku oversaw the Alliance for the Future of Kosovo's election headquarters in the 2001 Kosovan parliamentary election and introduced its election list to the media in September 2001. He himself appeared in the eleventh position on the list. The election was held under closed list proportional representation; the AAK won eight seats, and he was not elected.

The AAK joined Kosovo's coalition government after the election and received two cabinet positions. When the new ministry was formed on 4 April 2002, Çeku was appointed as minister of environment and urban planning. Following his appointment, he said his first priority would be the development and implementation of a legal structure for his ministry; once this was in place, his focus would turn to building industrial zones and infrastructure, environmental protection, and management of natural resources. He said that Pristina's growing illegal construction sector was a serious problem and also accused neighbouring Macedonia of "invading" 2,500 hectares of Kosovo's territory.

In a November 2003 interview, Çeku highlighted his ministry's work in promulgating laws on environment and spatial planning and expressed hope that the assembly would soon approve further laws on water supply, housing, and the Bjeshkët e Nemuna range. He identified limited finances and a lack of qualified employees as his department's main challenges and called for additional funding from international donors.

Çeku was injured in a February 2004 car bomb attack in Peja. The injuries were minor, and he was treated at a local hospital. Police did not identify a motive for the attack.

In May 2004, Çeku met with Albanian public works and tourism minister Bashkim Fino in Pristina. Their talks covered illegal housing construction, tourism, and the integration of Kosovo's highway system with Albania and Macedonia. The following month, Çeku presented Kosovo's Strategy for Sustainable Environmental Development at a public event at the University of Pristina, and the Kosovo assembly approved his ministry's bill on Kosovo's waters.

Çeku and Turkish environment minister Osman Pepe signed a protocol on environmental cooperation in September 2004.

==== Minister of Energy (2004–08) ====
Çeku was given the eighth position on the AAK's electoral list in the 2004 Kosovan parliamentary election and was elected when the list won nine seats. His first parliamentary term was brief; the Democratic League of Kosovo formed a new coalition government with the AAK after the election, and Çeku was appointed as minister of energy when the ministry was formed on 3 December 2004. He was also appointed to a lead role in the development of Kosovo's economic development strategy.

Shortly after his appointment as energy minister, Çeku took part in a public debate with Nexhat Daci, who was then president of the Assembly of Kosovo. Daci proposed shutting down the Kosovo A Power Station, which he described as obsolete, and replacing it with a series of smaller plants. Çeku argued for revitalizing Kosovo A and restarting the Kosovo B plant, and for targeting unmetered connections to Kosovo's power grid.

In June 2005, Çeku introduced a fifteen-year energy development strategy, highlighted by a pledge for Kosovo to have 4,200 megawatts in new generating capacities by 2020. He argued that Kosovo's energy sector was making progress in fulfilling Kosovo's energy needs, citing a recent memorandum with Albania on a 400-kilowatt transmitting line. Two months later, he said that Kosovo Energy Corporation (KEK) officials, with whom he had a poor relationship generally in this period, would need to provide residents with all-day electricity transmission or face punitive measures.

Çeku reactivated the Trepča Mines on a three-month experimental basis in August 2005. He expressed confidence that the enterprise would prove economically viable and increase the social welfare of the Mitrovica District. The following month, he joined with representatives of the European Agency for Reconstruction to announce a plan for rehabilitating Kosovo A. On the latter occasion, he proposed a "zero tolerance" plan for those not paying energy bills.

In November 2005, Çeku was appointed to chair a joint UNMIK–Kosovo task force on energy. In February of the following year, he was appointed to a task force on the opening of the R 6 Motorway.

Çeku presented a plan for the development of a Kosovo C power plant in May 2006. Construction was slated to begin in 2008. Çeku described the plant as the largest investment that Kosovo's government had made since the beginning of UNMIK's mandate and said that it would generate one hundred fifty million Euros per year for the state. He also indicated that Kosovo's government would have only a minority stake in the plant, with private investors holding the majority of shares. One of the plant's strongest supporters was UNMIK deputy chief of internal administration Steven P. Schook, with whom Çeku had formed a close partnership.

In June 2006, Çeku rejected a proposal by the Russian firm Gazprom to build a new power capacity fuelled by imported natural gas.

The Kosovo government appointed Çeku as chair of the Kosovo Energy Corporation in May 2007. Shortly thereafter, he led the board in dismissing Pranvera Dobruna-Kryeziu as managing director, only eight months into her term. He said that her dismissal was due to poor performance and lack of cooperation between the corporation and the energy ministry. In August of the same year, he led the board in ending the KEK's financial support for Radio Television of Kosovo (RTK).

Çeku and Kosovo interior minister Blerim Kuçi introduced a 2007 memorandum that made vehicle registration conditional on the payment of all outstanding energy bills. An unintended consequence of this was a decrease in the number of registered vehicles and greater financial pressure on Kosovo's insurance agencies.

Kosovo's energy sector faced significant challenges during the early 2000s, with frequent power shortages and an irregular power supply. The World Bank's director for South East Europe expressed disappointment with the sector in July 2007, saying that it had not been managed properly despite significant investments. The non-government organization COHU! accused Çeku of damaging local energy production by favouring international investors.

=== Opposition legislator (2008–11) ===
Çeku once again oversaw the Alliance for the Future of Kosovo's election headquarters for the 2007 Kosovan parliamentary election. Prior to this election, Kosovo adopted a system of open list proportional representation. Çeku was given the fifth position on the AAK's list and finished eighth among its candidates. The list won ten seats. Çeku was not immediately elected due to a requirement for one-third female representation, but he was the first candidate in line for a replacement seat, and he was able to take a seat when party leader Ramush Haradinaj resigned his mandate soon after the election. (At the time, Haradinaj was facing charges of war crimes at the International Criminal Tribunal for the former Yugoslavia (ICTY); he was later acquitted.)

The Democratic Party of Kosovo (PDK) won the 2007 election and afterward formed a new coalition government with the LDK. The AAK moved into opposition. In mid-2008, it was reported that the new PDK-led administration regarded virtually everything Çeku accomplished as energy minister with suspicion and that United Nations administrators were investigating whether senior UN officials had worked with Kosovo politicians to manipulate the Kosovo C tender process. Çeku, for his part, accused the government of mismanaging Kosovo's international relations around the Kosovo C plant and in March 2010 expressed doubt that the project would ever start. (Kosovo C was, in fact, ultimately cancelled.)

Çeku appeared in the fourteenth position on the AAK's list in the 2010 parliamentary election, finished seventeenth among its candidates, and was not re-elected when the list won twelve seats. He resigned from all party functions in the AAK in July 2012 and has not returned to active political life since this time.

== Academic career ==
Çeku began working at the University of Pristina in 1989. He became an assistant professor at the post-war institution in 2010, was appointed as dean of the education department in 2012, and was promoted to associate professor in 2021. In 2016, he published the book Kosovo and Diplomacy Since World War II.
