= Electricity sector in Kosovo =

Electricity sector of Kosovo
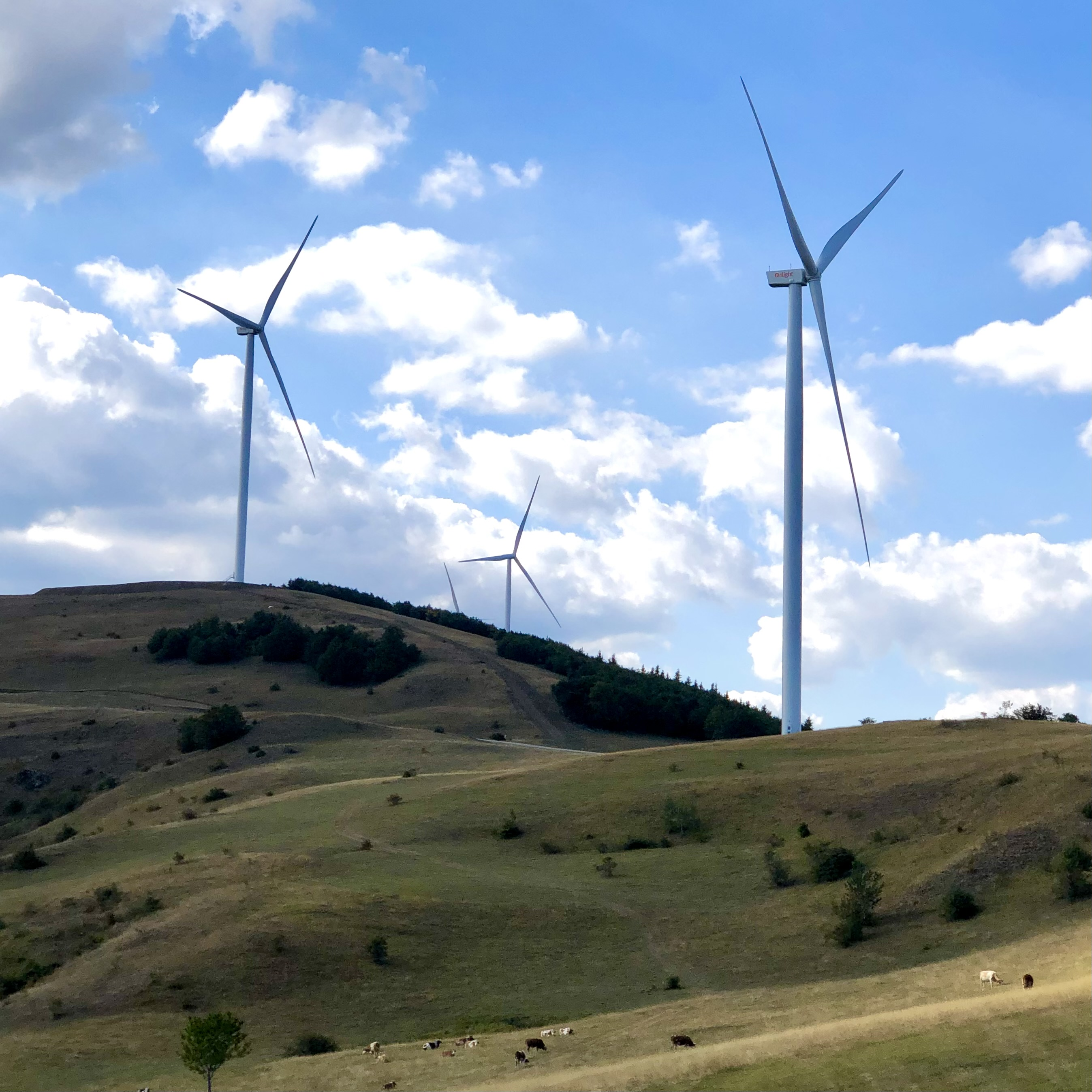
- The Bajgora Wind Farm, the largest wind farm in Kosovo

Data
- Electricity coverage: 100%
- Peak Demand (2021): 1,398 MW
- Installed capacity (2021): 1,236 MW
- Production (2021): 6,207 GWh
- Exports (2021): 835 GWh
- Imports (2021): 1,311 GWh
- Share of fossil energy: 95.2%
- Share of renewable energy: 4.7%
- Distribution losses (2021): 24.6%
- Transmission losses (2021): 1.6%

Services
- Share of private sector in distribution: 100%

Institutions
- Responsibility for transmission: KOSTT
- Responsibility for regulation: ERO
- Responsibility for policy-setting: Ministry of Economic Development
- Responsibility for the environment: Ministry of Environment and Spatial Planning
- Electricity sector law: Yes (2010)

The electricity sector of Kosovo relies on coal-fired power plants (92% as of 2023) and is considered one of the sectors with the greatest potential of development. The inherited issues after the war in Kosovo and the transition period have had an immense effect on the progress of this sector.

Regulation of activities in energy sector in Kosovo is a responsibility of the Energy Regulatory Office (ERO). An additional factor in the energy sector in Kosovo is Ministry of Economic Development (MZHE), which has the responsibility of dealing with issues that have to do with energy. MZHE prepares legislation and drafts strategies and projects.

== Policy and regulation ==
The main institutions responsible for the energy sector management in Kosovo are: Ministry of Economic Development (MZHE) and Energy Regulatory Office (ERO). Important responsibilities are also held by the Ministry of Environment and Spatial Planning, the Ministry of Trade and Industry, the Ministry of Agriculture, Forestry and Rural Development, and the Ministry of Infrastructure. Besides government institutions, there are also companies with great impact in energy sector such as Kosovo Energy Corporation (KEK), Transmission, System and Market Operator (KOSTT) and Kosovo Electricity Distribution and Supply (KEDS).

A lot of legislative documents that aim the adjustment of electricity sector have been approved. This includes laws, administrative instructions and strategic documents. All this legislative framework is drafted relying on EU corresponding documents.

Kosovo, rich in lignite coal reserves, relies on outdated Yugoslav-era power plants that cannot meet its increasing energy demands. The 2023 National Energy Strategy aims to raise renewable energy to 35% of the energy mix, reduce greenhouse gas emissions by 32%, and phase out a lignite-fired power unit by 2031. Additionally, it plans to start preparations for carbon pricing by 2026.

== Renewable energy targets ==
By 2021 Kosovo had 279 MW of Renewable Electricity Standard (RES) power generation capacity installed.

The Kosovo energy strategy includes increasing RES capacity to 35% of electricity consumption by 2031. Aiming for 600 MW wind, 600 MW solar PV, 20 MW biomass & at least 100 MW of prosumer capacity, to reach a total installed RES capacity of 1600 MW by 2031.

== Electricity generation ==
=== Conventional Sources ===
==== Coal plants ====
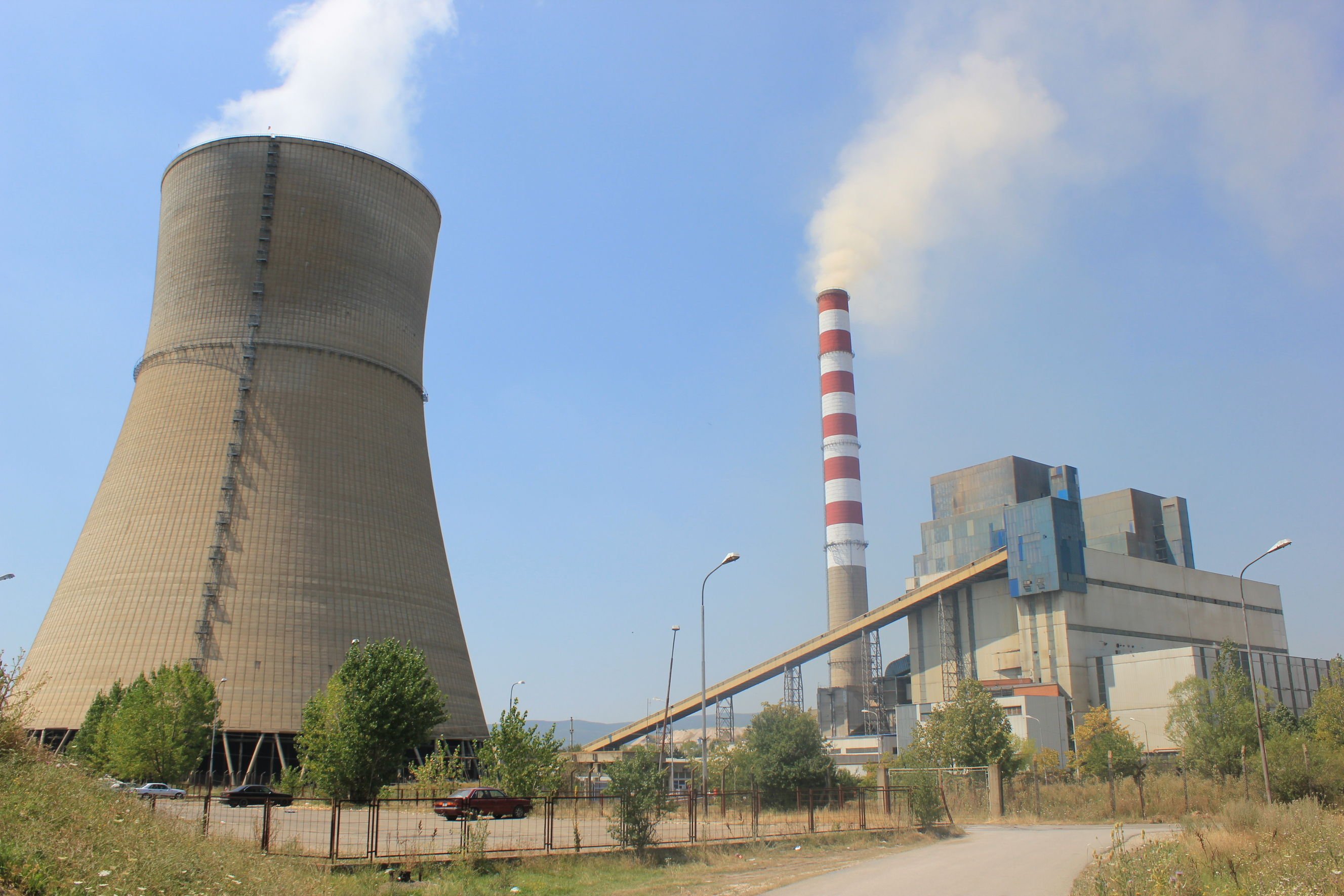
Power Plant in Kastriot, Kosovo

Lignite exploitation in Kosovo started in 1922. New mines were opened to satisfy the needs by increasing generation capacities. Kosovo Energetic Corporation (KEK) is a public company, which owns and operates with generation assets of electric energy.

The greatest part of generation capacities of Kosovo are the two power plants: Kosova A and Kosova B. The capacities of the two power plants are lower than the installation parameters level, because of the outdated system and lack of maintenance during the last decade of the 20th century. The first unit of Kosova A power plant started working in 1962 with a power of generation 65 MW. The last unit A5 was built in 1975. A1 and A2 units are out of function and they are planned to be decommissioned. A3, A4 and A5 units are still in function. Kosova B power plant is composed of two units. The first unit was built in 1983 with a capacity of 340 MW, while the second unit was built in 1984 with the same power of generation. The conditions in Kosova B power plant have improved after recent investments. The power plants and coal mines are located in Kastriot. Technical and commercial losses and the conditions of the power plants together with the high debts have brought KEK in a difficult financial situation.

=== Renewable Sources ===
==== Hydro ====
The only major power station outside of KEK is Ujmani hydroelectric power plant which is administrated by the Hydro-economic Enterprise "Iber-Lepenc". Hydroelectric power generation is mainly provided by Ujmani power station with a capacity of 70 MW. In the past, Kosovo has had four functional hydroelectric power plants. After the 1999 war they stopped working, but they have been rehabilitated in the recent years.

- Lumbardhi hydroelectric power plant was rehabilitated in 2005. A private company has rent it for a period of 20 years. Its capacity of generation is 23 MW.
- Dikanci hydroelectric power plant is rented and started functioning in 2010, with a capacity increased from 15 MW to 28 MW
- Radavci hydroelectric power plant was rehabilitated in 2010 from a company which has rented it. Its capacity was increased from 15 MW to 30 MW.
- Burimi hydroelectric power plant was rented and its capacity was increased from 10 MW to 25 MW.

As of 2021, hydroelectric power also played a significant role in the electricity mix, accounting for approximately 8.4% of the total installed capacity.

==== Wind ====
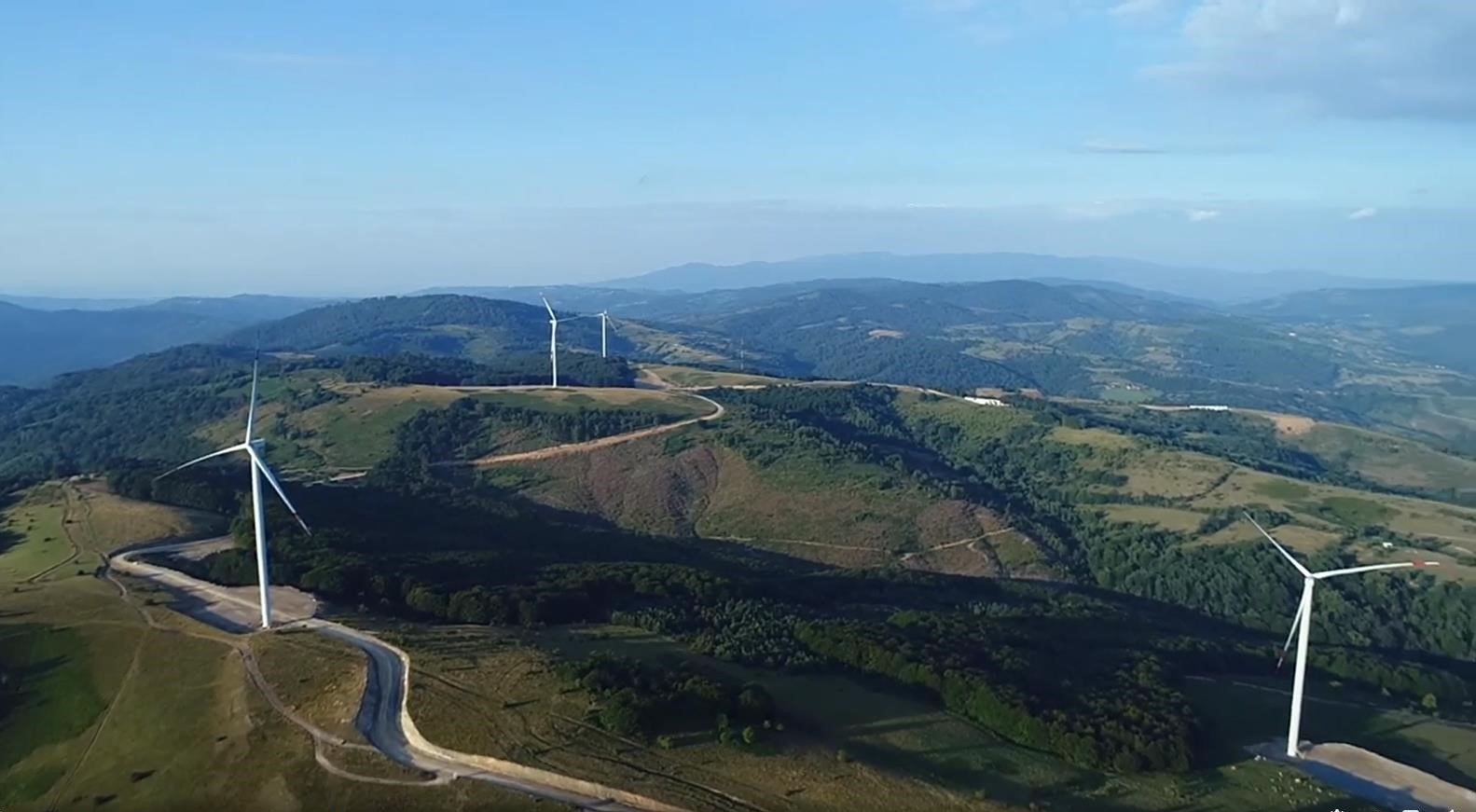
Kitka Wind Farm

There are currently two completed wind farms (Bajgora Wind Farm and Kitka Wind Farm) with a combined installed capacity of 135 MW. There are also several proposed projects waiting for approval and another approved 100 MW wind farm in Vushtrri.

Kitka Wind Farm is the first wind plant in Kosovo with 9 General Electric 3.6 MW turbines and it has an installed capacity of 32.4 MW.

The 102.6 MW wind farm in Bajgora is the largest in Kosovo so far. The wind farm consists of 27 turbines supplied by General Electric. Its total annual output is estimated at 320 GWh, while the system is designed to be operated for at least 25 years. The project was developed by SoWi Kosovo, a joint venture between Kosovar, German and Israeli partners.

By 2021, Kosovo had commissioned wind generator units totaling 137 MW, which constituted 9% of the country's installed capacity.

==== Solar ====
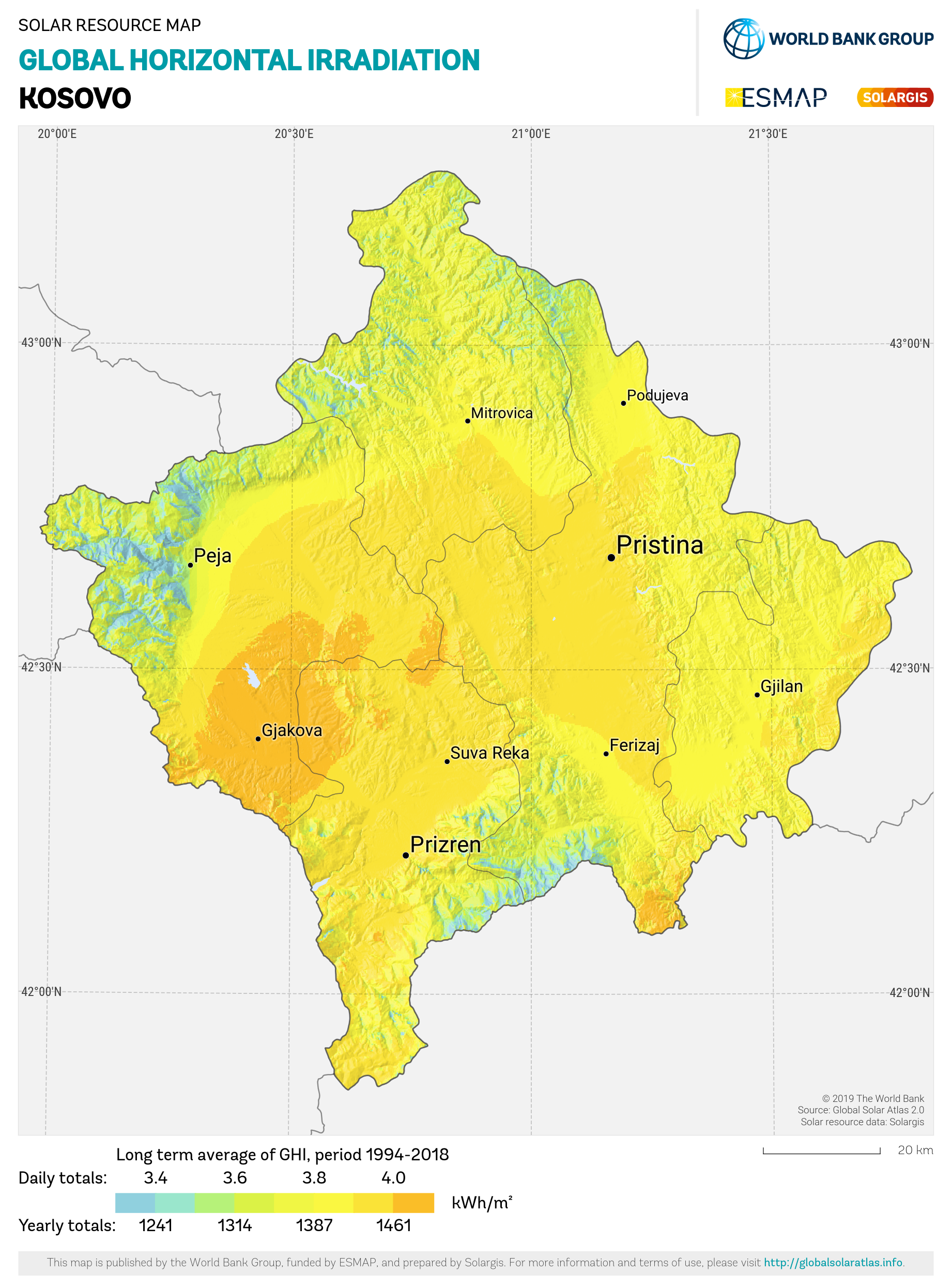
Solar potential of Kosovo

Kosovo has the potential of capturing solar energy directly and converting it to electricity. The region of highest solar potential based on global horizontal irradiation is the southwestern part of Kosovo, centred around the city of Gjakova. Solar power is already used on the roofs of some buildings. JAHA SOLAR, a subsidiary of the larger JAHA-Group, was founded in 2016 and is the first producer of solar panels in the Western Balkans.

In late December 2022, Kosovo became the first country in the Western Balkans Economy to use solar energy for district heating. Kosovo's Minister of Finance, Labour and Transfers, Hekuran Murati, said the project would ensure access to the central heating system for about 38,000 citizens.

Kosovo Energy Corporation has planned a 100 MW solar power plant near Prishtina, the largest solar power plant in Kosovo. The solar power plant is estimated to have an annual output of 169 GWh.

== Transmission ==
Kosovo is a key point in Southeast Europe because of its geographic position in the center of the region. As such, electrical energy transmission system is very well connected to neighboring systems with transmission lines of 400 kV level. Transmission System and Market Operator (KOSTT) was founded in 2006 and it is a public company, responsible for operation planning, maintenance and development of transmission network and interconnection with neighboring energetic systems, in order to retain supply insurance in Kosovo. KOSTT is also responsible for the operation of electrical energy market in Kosovo. Kosovo was part of the Regional Energy Community and was connected with the regional system through interconnections with Serbia, North Macedonia, Montenegro and Albania. KOSTT made an agreement with ENTSO-E so Kosovo gets his own independent region of energy administration. Kosovo gets full independence and control of its energy industry.

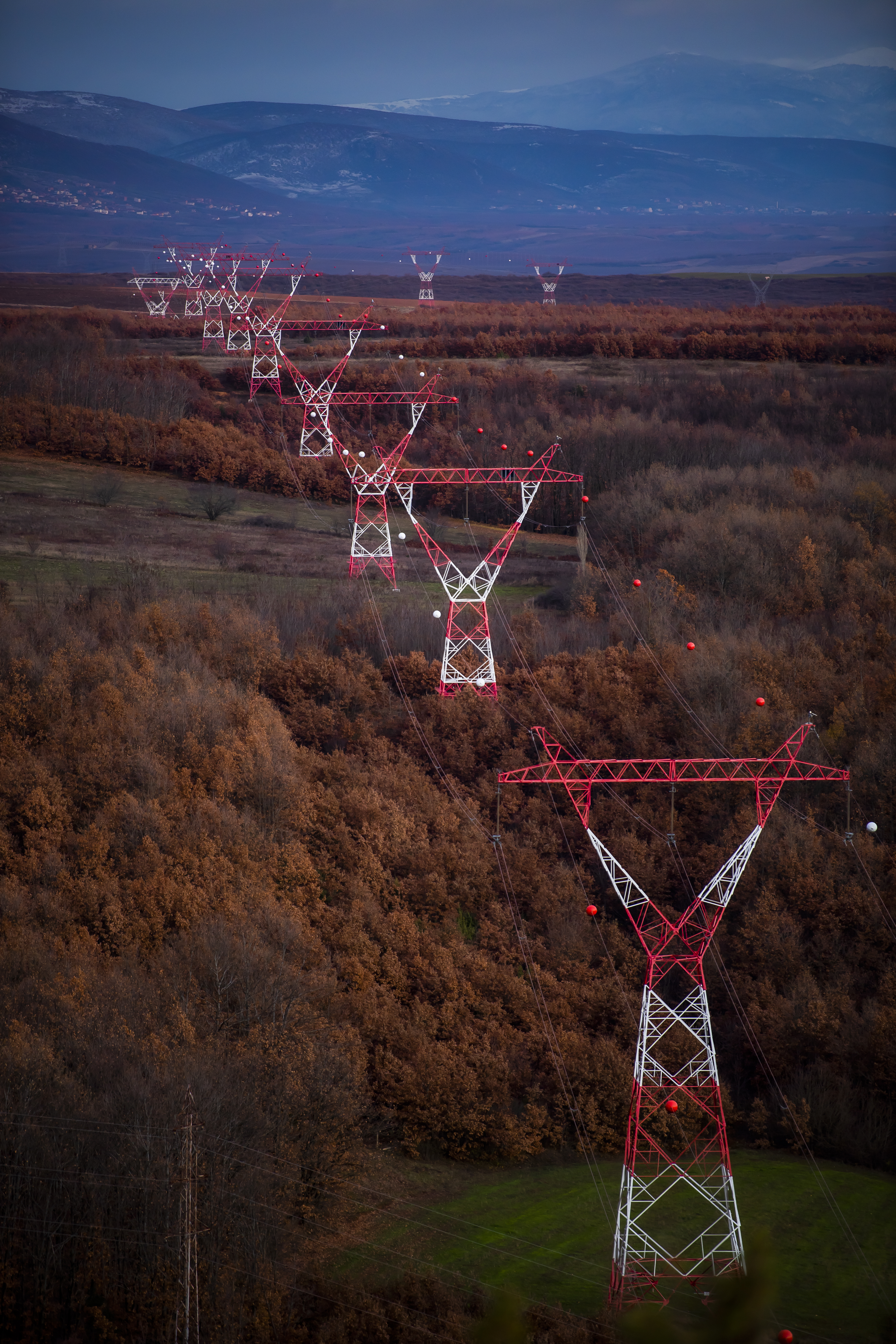
400 kV transmission lines between Albania and Kosovo, also known as "Energy Highway".

After the agreement between KOSTT-ENTSO-E, Kosovo made a joint with Albania and the 400 kV interconnection known as "Energy Highway" (or in Albanian "Autostrada Energjetike"), which was finished in 2016, but it was enabled in 2020, opening the way for the establishment of a joint power exchange between Kosovo and Albania.

== Distribution ==
The distribution network, as a regulated energy activity, is responsible for the operation and maintenance of the distribution system and the management of the generators connected to the distribution system. Distribution network consists of voltage lines of 35 kV, 10(20) kV, 6 kV and 0.4 kV, as well as relevant substations of the level 35/x kV, 10(20)/0.4 kV and 6/0.4 kV.

Kosovo Energy Distribution and Supply Company (KEDS) is a company operating throughout Kosovo having the exclusivity for electricity supply and distribution in the territory of Kosovo. Since May 2013, Kosovo Energy Distribution and Supply split from Kosovo Energy Cooperation and started its operational activities as a joint stock company. KEDS is owned now by Turkish companies Çalık Holding and Limak. KEDS is considered one of the largest employers in Kosovo, having 2618 employees. Furthermore, over 450 thousand customers are provided with electricity supply covering household customers, commercial and industrial customers. Currently there are three main projects concerning distribution: Construction of medium voltage distribution facilities of the new 110/10(20) kV Prishtina 7 substation, Expansion and reinforcement of the low voltage distribution network 2013, and Expansion and reinforcement of the medium voltage distribution network 2013. Additionally, KEDS intends to invest 110 million euros on the 5 forthcoming years and 300 million euros on 15-year period.

Distribution losses are currently at 24.6% where 12.5% are technical losses and 12.1% are commercial losses. The majority of the commercial losses are because of the Serb-majority municipalities in northern Kosovo refusing to pay for the electricity. As a result, the energy-intensive industry of cryptomining, especially of Bitcoin, is especially profitable in northern Kosovo, even though it has been banned.

== Electricity consumption ==
Consumption of electrical energy in Kosovo has increased continuously. The constant increase of economic development and population have increased the energy demands. Even though the generating capacities are increasing mostly in the form of renewables, to cover the demand, Kosovo imports electrical energy in certain periods of time (mostly during the winter).

In the year 2021, the total amount of electrical energy consumption was at 5,306.3 GWh, while the brutto generation was 6,890.5 GWh.

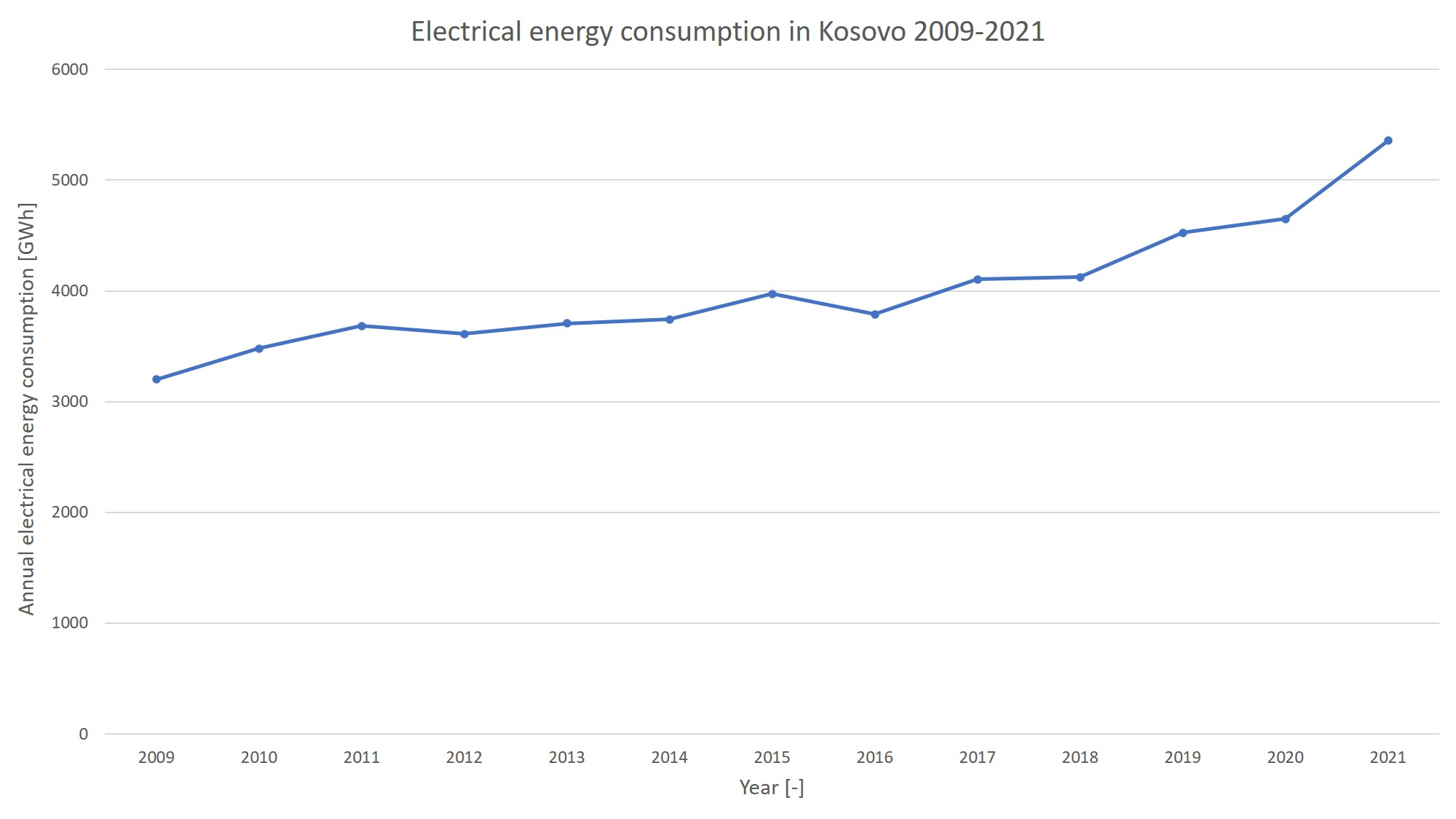
Electrical energy consumption in Kosovo during the years 2009-2021

=== Import-Export ===
Import covers 5-10% of the consumption. Usually, in Kosovo the imported energy is much more expensive than export. This is because Kosovo imports energy one day before needed, in the other hand energy is exported during the night when the demands are under generating level. Imports and exports have a negative impact for electrical energy price.

== Tariffs ==
The Energy Regulatory Office (ERO) is an independent company which sets the regulatory framework founded on the principals of free trade. The energy price is determined by different factors: operative cost, maintenance cost, import and other factors. The decrease of commercial and technical losses would affect positively. Factors that have kept the low prizes until now are: foreign investments as grants, government subventions, the lack of investments for environment protection and inexpensive labor force. KEK generating about 97% of the energy has the monopoly of market. ERO has the jurisdiction of setting tariffs for energy services.

Until 2020, Kosovo promoted renewable energy in the electricity sector using a feed-in tariff, which was suspended by the ERO due to the cost-efficiency of competitive support mechanisms. Kosovo is now developing a legal framework to introduce more effective and transparent schemes, like auctions, to advance renewable energy growth.

In April 2025, the ERO announced a 16.1% increase in electricity tariffs as Kosovo was forced to import more power to meet domestic demand. Prior to this general rise, households consuming over 800 kWh per month, had already faced a sharp increase, with tariffs above this threshold being raised by approximately 103 percent.

== Power plants impact on environment and health ==
Environment protection is a mission of the Ministry of Environment and Spatial Planning (MMPH). Since most of electric power is produced by power plants in Kosovo they are considered the main environment pollutant. Actual emission of gases, dust and waste-water discharged from the existing power plants, are above the levels allowed by the EU directives. According to the World Bank’s statistics, 835 deaths, 310 new cases of chronic bronchitis, 22,900 new cases of respiratory diseases among children, 11,160 emergency visits to country's hospital and there is a 100 million euros loss are caused each year because of coal plants.

=== Energy efficiency ===
Kosovo Agency for Energy Efficiency - KAEE is executive institution under the Ministry of Economic Development. KAEE implements energy efficiency policies through evaluating energy saving opportunities and implementing energy efficiency measures in all sectors of energy consumption. This agency has drafted Energy Efficiency legislative frameworks aiming to implement the best EU practices. The World Bank is preparing a project of $32.5 million in order to finance investment, and to technically support the strengthening of renewable energy regulation and policies.

== Cooperation ==
Based on the increase of demand, the role of import is essential to provide stable supplement. Kosovo has signed several agreements for cooperation on energy sector with Albania. The fact that the electrical energy system of Albania relies on hydro energy (almost 100%), while Kosovo relies on power plants, is a great opportunity for cooperation between the two countries. Moreover, a 400 kV interconnection line is in its final proceeding before the beginning of building.

Under the Energy Community Treaty, Kosovo is working towards integration into the European Union's (EU) internal energy markets with the goal of establishing a competitive energy market. In collaboration with Albania, Kosovo plans to implement market coupling and launch the Albania Power Exchange (ALPEX) in 2023. This initiative is designed to enhance cost-efficiency for meeting renewable energy targets and to improve system flexibility. By 2030, Kosovo aims for full integration into the pan-European market.

== New alternatives for energy ==
Kosova e Re is a project for building a new power plant. The building of this power plant would fulfill the needs for electric power in Kosovo. This project has been modified several times. Minister of Economic Development, Fadil Ismajli, claimed that Kosova e Re is due to being built in 2015.

Zhur Hydroelectric Power Plant project is a new opportunity for using reliable energy potentials. It is evaluated that Zhur HPP generation capacity would be 305 MW. The project is pending because of the high cost, limited capacities and issues that relating with the use of water with Albania.

Studies have shown that beside hydroelectric power plants there are other alternatives to lignite power plants. It is considered that an ideally located solar collector in Kosovo can produce 1600 kWh/m2/year. A study made by Energy and Recourses Group University of California claims that the approximate energy that Kosovo could generate from biomass resources is 6600 GWh/yr. While neighboring countries (North Macedonia and Serbia) generate a portion of their electric power by using geothermal sites, in Kosovo there is a lack of studies on this field.

== See also ==
- Economy of Kosovo
- Natural resources of Kosovo
- Environmental issues in Pristina
