= Energy Regulatory Office =

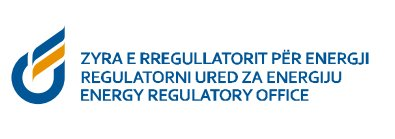
Energy Regulatory Office

The Energy Regulatory Office (ERO) is an independent regulatory agency which sets the regulatory framework founded on the principles of free trade in Kosovo.

== Functions ==
The energy price is determined by different factors: operative cost, maintenance cost, import and other factors. The decrease of commercial and technical losses would affect positively in the tariffs of energy in Kosovo. Factors that have kept the low prizes until now are: foreign investments as grants, government subsidies, the lack of investments for environment protection and inexpensive labor force. Kosovo Energy Corporation (KEK) generating about 97% of the energy has the monopoly of market. ERO has the jurisdiction of setting tariffs for energy services.

== See also ==
- Electrical energy in Kosovo
