= List of solar farms in Kosovo =

This is a list of solar parks in Kosovo.

== Largest projects ==
These are some of the largest solar park projects in Kosovo, including operational, under-construction, authorized and proposed projects.

Solar parks in Kosovo
Project name	Sponsoring company	Installed capacity (MW)	Municipality	Status	Completed/notes
Lindja Solar	Lindja Solar	105	Rahovec	Under construction	Construction launched in 2026.
Solar Park Bec–Vraniq	Solar Energy Group Europe (SEGE)	150	Gjakova	Development	Planned solar power project.
Solar Park Kosuriq	Solariss LLC	99	Peja	Authorization application	Authorization application submitted in June 2026.
Solar Tuçep	AKG Solar Tuçep LLC	80	Istog	Authorized	Solar park in the cadastral zones of Tuçep and Kërrninë.
Solar Kërrninë 1	AKG Solar Kërrninë 1 LLC	40	Istog	Authorized	Solar park in Kërrninë.
Solar Veriq	AKG Solar Veriq LLC	40	Istog	Authorized	Solar park in Veriq and Tuçep.
Solar Kërrninë 2	AKG Solar Kërrninë 2 LLC	28	Istog	Authorized	Solar park in Kërrninë.
KEK Solar Park	Kosovo Energy Corporation	100	To be determined	Planned	Proposed large-scale solar power project.
Solar Park Madanaj	Eco Park Group	6	Gjakova	Development	Project details and current status require verification.
Eris Solar	Eris Solar SH.P.K.	3.5	Istog	Authorized	Solar photovoltaic project in Bellopojë.

== Totals ==
Total capacity of listed projects
Category	Total capacity
Operational	To be determined
Under construction	105 MW
Authorized or under development	347.5 MW
Proposed	199 MW
Total listed capacity	651.5 MW

== See also ==
- List of wind farms in Kosovo
- Solar power
- Electricity sector in Kosovo
