= Kosova e Re =

Proposed power plant near Pristina, Kosovo

The Kosova e Re was a project of the Government of Kosovo to build a new 2,000-MW coal-fired power plant near Pristina, to rehabilitate the existing Kosovo B power plant and completely shut down the Kosovo A power plant which is considered the largest source of pollution in Kosovo. It also included the development of a new lignite mine in order to meet the needs of the Kosovo B and the newly constructed power plant. It was originally estimated to cost US$2 billion.

The government had identified the need for additional generation capacities to address long-term concerns about the country's power supply security. Government policy goals, also presented in all Kosovo Energy Strategies, apart from the plans for new generation electricity capacities, also aimed at involving the private sector in the Kosova e Re Power Plant (KRPP) infrastructure project. It included development, design, construction, financing, ownership, maintenance and operation in accordance with IED Best Available Techniques (BAT).

In March 2020, the British company ContourGlobal announced the abandonment of the project.

== History ==
Plans to address Kosovo's energy situation began in the early 2000s and originally envisioned a 2,000-MW lignite plant that would allow the country to supply the domestic energy needs and also export energy to the neighboring countries. The government presented the plan in July 2009 and it suggested that all work would be finished by 2015 or at least by 2017. However, the works had not started, mainly because of the opposition from non-governmental organizations. Over the years political and investment setbacks had caused the project to cut down in size.

== Financing ==
To attract investors whom are concerned about political or credit risks, the World Bank offered US$60 million in loan guarantees that would set in if the government failed to meet obligations such as supplying coal or electricity. This means that the World Bank, as well as the biggest shareholder - the United States of America, will need to make an exception in their clean-energy commitments. On the 15th of January 2013, representatives of the European Bank for Reconstruction and Development (EBRD) met with Prime Minister Hashim Thaçi, expressing their interest to support the New Kosovo project. However, on December the 10th 2013 the EBRD employed a new strategy which decreased funding for the coal plants, with exception of rare circumstances.

== Supporters ==
A major obstacle for the economic growth and development of Kosovo is the inadequate and unreliable electricity supply. The country has the world's fifth-largest reserves of lignite which could, with the current consumption levels, supply the country for another 1500 years. Supporters of the project (at the forefront being the World Bank and the U.S. government) saw lignite exploitation as the quickest way out of poverty and a way to procure Kosovo’s energy independence and consequently its energy security.

There were also those who supported Kosova e Re from the environmental stand point. In the report of Kosova e Re by the Expert Panel of the World Bank, reviewed that the project discovered that particulate matter emissions produced by Kosova e Re would be reduced by more than 90%, sulfur oxide and nitrogen oxide reduced by around 70% and would be carbon neutral, if not carbon reducing, for each MWh produced. Kjorton Bjornson from the European Commission in July 2009 expressed support for the construction of the new power plant with the view to shut down Kosovo A plant. However, the European Parliament resolution on the integration process of Kosovo into the EU stated that the financial aid provided by the EU should be devoted to supporting renewable energy projects to close down its two highly polluting coal plants. It calls on the European Commission to take action to contest plans such as Kosova e Re that run counter to EU climate commitments.

== Opposition ==
Certain groups and organisations are of the view that the new power plant would mean the continuation of traditional coal-based electricity production. Today Kosovo wastes 30% of available energy due to energy efficiency, 37% due to technical losses, the outdated electrical grid and other commercial losses, such as theft. A study by Dr. Daniel Kammen shows that "Kosovo can cover 38% of its energy consumption from renewable sources". He also specified that this scenario, without including the Kosova e Re power plant, would create 27% more jobs than current scenarios. Energy Community commitments cite that Kosovo needs to source 25% of overall energy from renewable sources by 2020, which will be harder to achieve if the new power plant is to be constructed. The Kosovo Civil Society Consortium for Sustainable Development (KOSID) are questioning the necessity of the costly power plant and instead propose energy efficiency programmes, which tackle of energy losses, renewable energy development and the rehabilitation of the existing Kosovo B Power Station. They also raise the issue of the environmental and social impacts the new project would have on Kosovars. There are 835 deaths per year in Kosovo due to air pollution, of which the lignite power plants are responsible for a substantial proportion. A new power station could make matters worse. KOSID also stressed the issue of water and agricultural land shortage and the resettlement of the local population which consists mostly of farmers who will need compensation for the lost land and livelihoods
