= List of power stations in Kosovo =

The following page lists the power stations in the electricity sector in Kosovo.

== Thermal ==
| Name | Location | Geographical coordinates | Nameplate capacity (MW) | Operational since | Fuel | Notes |
|---|---|---|---|---|---|---|
| Kosova A Power Plant | Obiliq | 42.40358°N 21.51285°E | 800 | 1962 | Coal (lignite) | |
| Kosova B Power Plant | Obiliq | 42.41344°N 21.32833°E | 680 | 1983 | Coal (lignite) | |

== Wind power ==
| Name | Location | Geographical coordinates | Peak power (MW) | Production (MW·h/year) | Notes |
|---|---|---|---|---|---|
| Bajgora Wind Farm | Mitrovica | 42.970556°N 21.014722°E | 102.6 | 320,000 | |
| Kitka Wind Farm | Kamenica | 42.655833°N 21.666389°E | 32.4 | 95,600 | |

== Hydroelectric ==
| Name | Peak power (MW) |
|---|---|
| Lumbardhi hydroelectric power plant | 23 |
| Dikanci hydroelectric power plant | 28 |
| Radavci hydroelectric power plant | 30 |
| Burimi hydroelectric power plant | 25 |
