= List of wind farms in Kosovo =

This is a list of the wind farms in Kosovo.

== Largest projects ==
These are the most important wind farm projects in Kosovo (larger than 10 MW):

Project name	Sponsoring company	Installed capacity (MW)	Municipality	Status	Completed/ notes
Bajgora Wind Farm	Sowi Kosova LLC	102.6	Mitrovicë	Completed	
Kitka Wind Farm	GURIS HOLDING CO	32.4	Dardanë	Completed	
Zatriqi Wind Park I & II	NEK Umwelttechnik AG	73.2	Rahovec	Completed	
Çiçavica Wind Farm	Akouo Energy	100	Vushtrri	Approved	
Koznica Wind Park	Prishtina Energy LLC	34.5	Artanë	Proposed	
Budakova Wind Park	Bondcom Energy Point LLC	46	Therandë	Proposed	
Krajkova Wind Park	Era Energji	21	Drenas	Proposed	
Wind Farm Shtime	KL-Energy LLC	80	Shtime	Proposed	

=== Totals ===
Category status	Total capacity
Completed	208.2 MW
Under construction	0 MW
Approved	100 MW
Proposed	181.5 MW
All stages	489.7 MW

== See also ==
- Category:Lists of wind farms
- List of solar farms in Kosovo
