= Bajgora Wind Farm =

Wind farm in Mitrovica, Kosovo

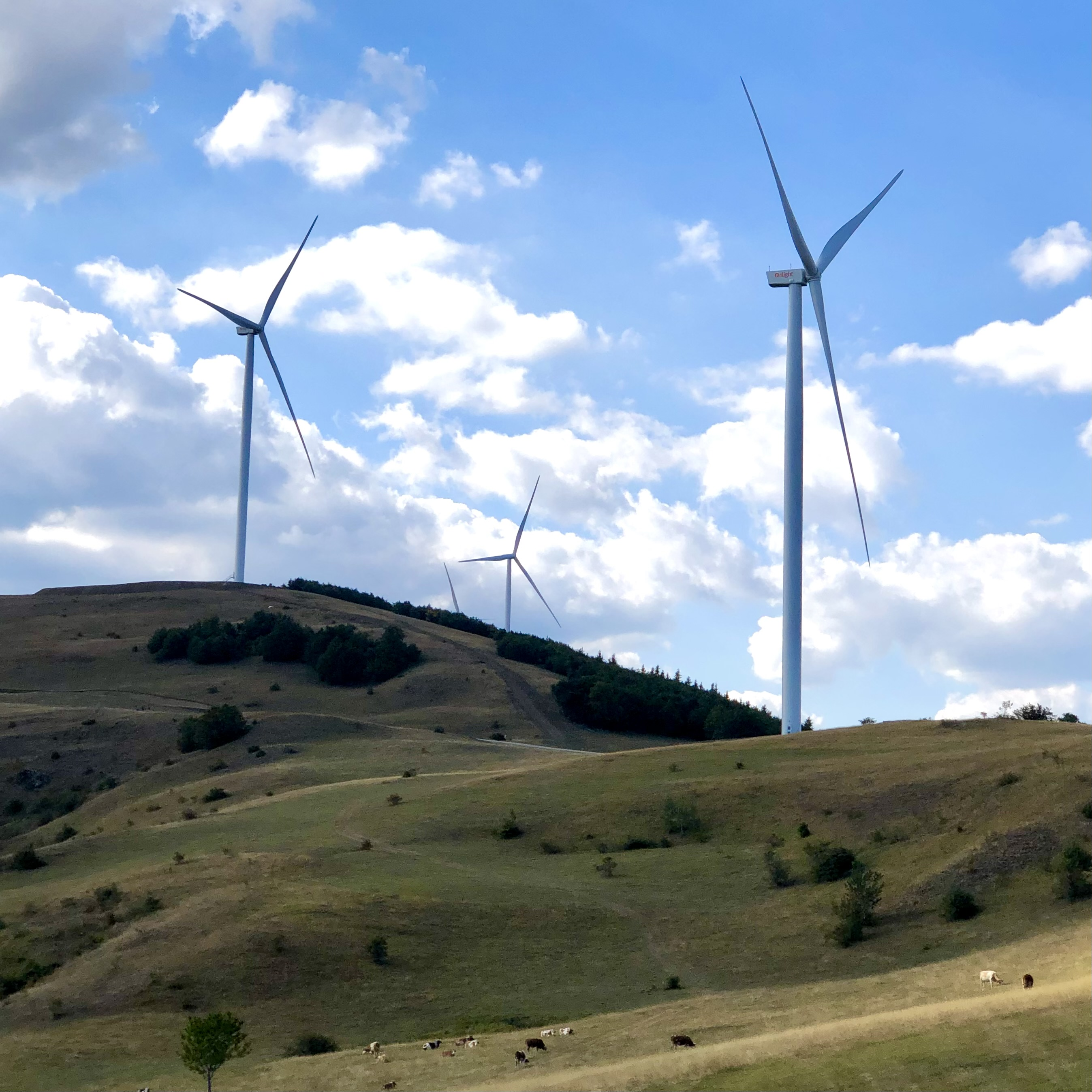
- A few of the 27 wind turbines
- Official name: Parku i Erës Bajgora
- Country: Kosovo
- Location: Bajgorë, Mitrovica
- Coordinates: 42°58′14″N 21°0′53″E
- Status: Operational
- Construction cost: EUR 157 million

Wind farm
- Type: Onshore
- Hub height: 110 m
- Rotor diameter: 137 m

Power generation
- Units operational: 27 x 3.8 MW
- Make and model: General Electric Energy 3.8-137
- Nameplate capacity: 102.6 MW
- Annual net output: 320 GWh

External links
- Commons: Related media on Commons

The Bajgora Wind Farm (Albanian: Parku i Erës Bajgora) is the largest wind farm in Kosovo. It has a nameplate capacity of 102.6 MW and it is estimated to have a total annual output of 320 GWh, while the system is designed to be operated for at least 25 years.

== Overview ==
The Bajgora Wind Farm consist of 27 wind turbines of type GE 3.8 - 137, each one having 3.8 MW nameplate capacity. The hub height is 110 meters and the rotor diameter is 137 meters. Each of the turbines has three blades with a diameter of 19.8 meters that are attached to the turbine rotor that converts the movement into energy. It first started to feed electricity into the grid with nine generators in November 2021. Also, a 120 MW substation was built to transform the wind farm's electricity to the 110 kV level.

== Location ==
The Bajgora Wind Farm is located about 40 kilometers north of Prishtina in the southern foothills of the Kopaonik Mountains, and it is in an altitude of 1800 m. It accounts for a tenth of the domestic installed capacity in Kosovo.

Pictures of the Bajgora Wind Farm
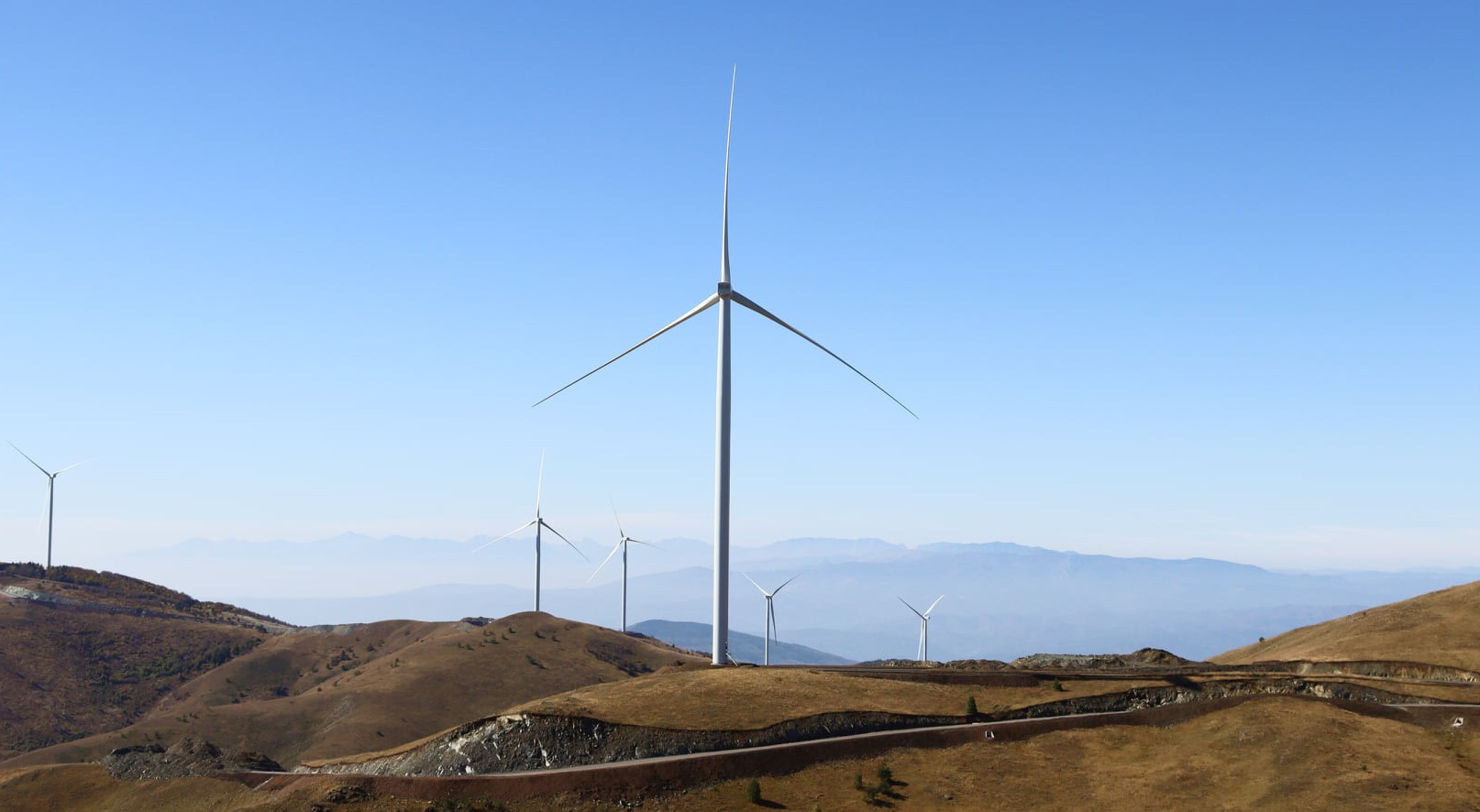
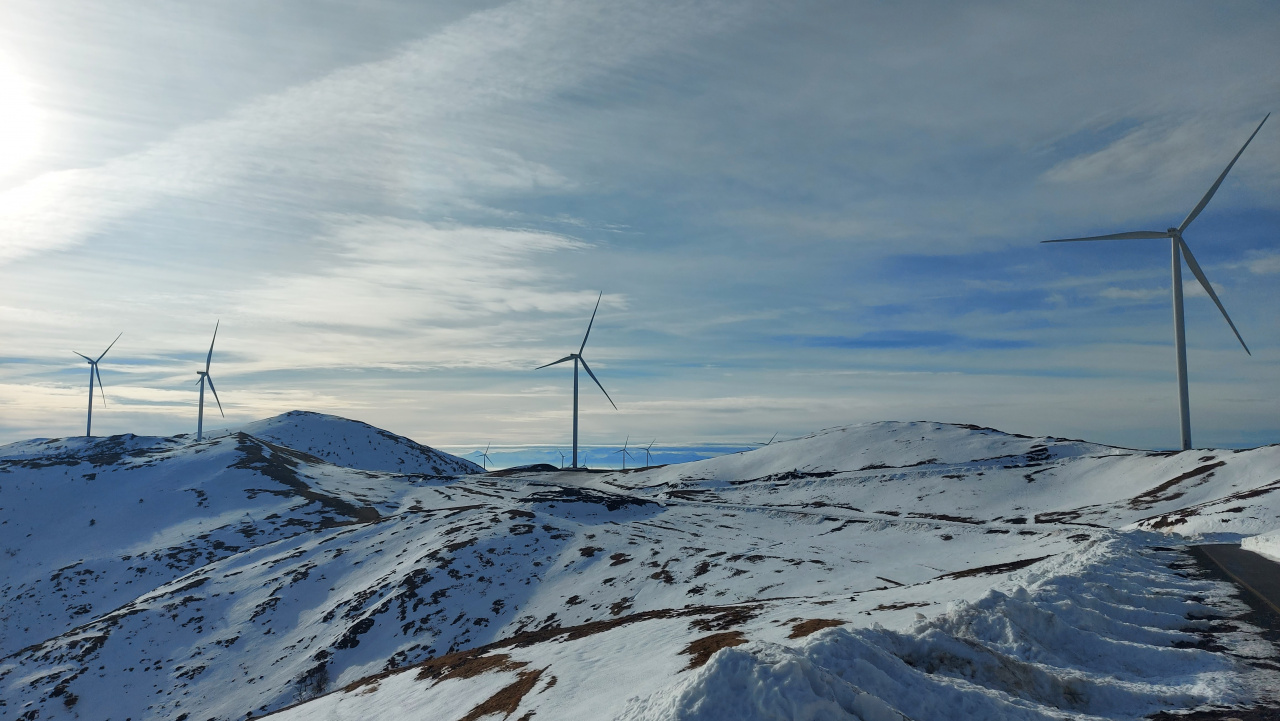

== See also ==
- Kitka Wind Farm
- List of wind farms in Kosovo
- Electrical energy in Kosovo
- List of power stations in Kosovo
