= KOSTT =

- Company type: Joint-stock company
- Industry: Energy
- Founded: 2006 (20 years ago)
- Headquarters: Pristina, Kosovo
- Key people: Kadri Kadriu (acting chief executive officer)
- Services: Electricity transmission
- Owner: Government of Kosovo (100 %)
- Website: kostt.com

KOSTT j.s.c is a transmission system operator company with its headquarters based in Pristina, Kosovo.

It plays an important role in the energy sector in Kosovo. As a market operator it is responsible for the organization and administration of trades in electricity and the management of the settlement process.

It is a member of the Energy Community, an international organization consisting of the European Union (EU) and a number of non-EU countries.

KOSTT is control area and it is synchronously connected with continental Europe and cooperating with RG CE TSOs to abide by the EU packages. It expects to become a member of the European Network of Transmission System Operators for Electricity in the future.

== History ==
Appointed by the Ministry of Energy and Mining of Kosovo and licensed by the Energy Regulatory Office pursuant to the provisions of the primary and secondary Kosovo legislation, KOSTT j.s.c became a licensed entity for the transmission system operator and for the market operation, in October 2006.

The establishment of KOSTT j.s.c was a consequence of the restructuring of the energy sector in Kosovo. The transmission and dispatch functions officially have been divided from the Kosovo Energy Corporation (KEK) (a vertically integrated company) on 1 July 2006, following the decision of the Government of Kosovo taken in July 2005 for restructuring of KEK and the obligations deriving from the Energy Community Treaty for South East Europe where Kosovo is an equal member.

In March 2018, the European electricity transmission association ENTSO-E warned over delay of electric clocks throughout Europe's power network due to lower frequency which was caused by the loss of electricity in the network. Namely, the loss was created due to political dispute between Serbia and Kosovo where the Kosovar power transmission company KOSTT took 113 GWh unauthorizedly from the network in the period of January–February 2018. The Serbian electricity transmission operator Elektromreža Srbije has legal jurisdiction over Kosovar electricity transmission network, but due to political dispute, does not exercise full control over it. The direct loss of 113 GWh would amount to 24.86 million euros, as per average euro area electricity price (per KWh) of 22 eurocents for households in 2017.

In April 2020, a vote by the European Network of Transmission System Operators for Electricity, ENTSO-E, paved the way for Kosovo to become an independent regulatory zone for electricity. The vote confirmed that a connection agreement would be signed between ENTSO-E and KOSTT, the Kosovo Transmission System Operator, allowing KOSTT to join the 42 other transmission operators that make up the regional energy cooperation organisation. The membership of ENTSO-E as an independent zone would end Kosovo's reliance on the Serbian power grid, and enable a joint energy bloc between Kosovo and Albania, an agreement which was signed in December.

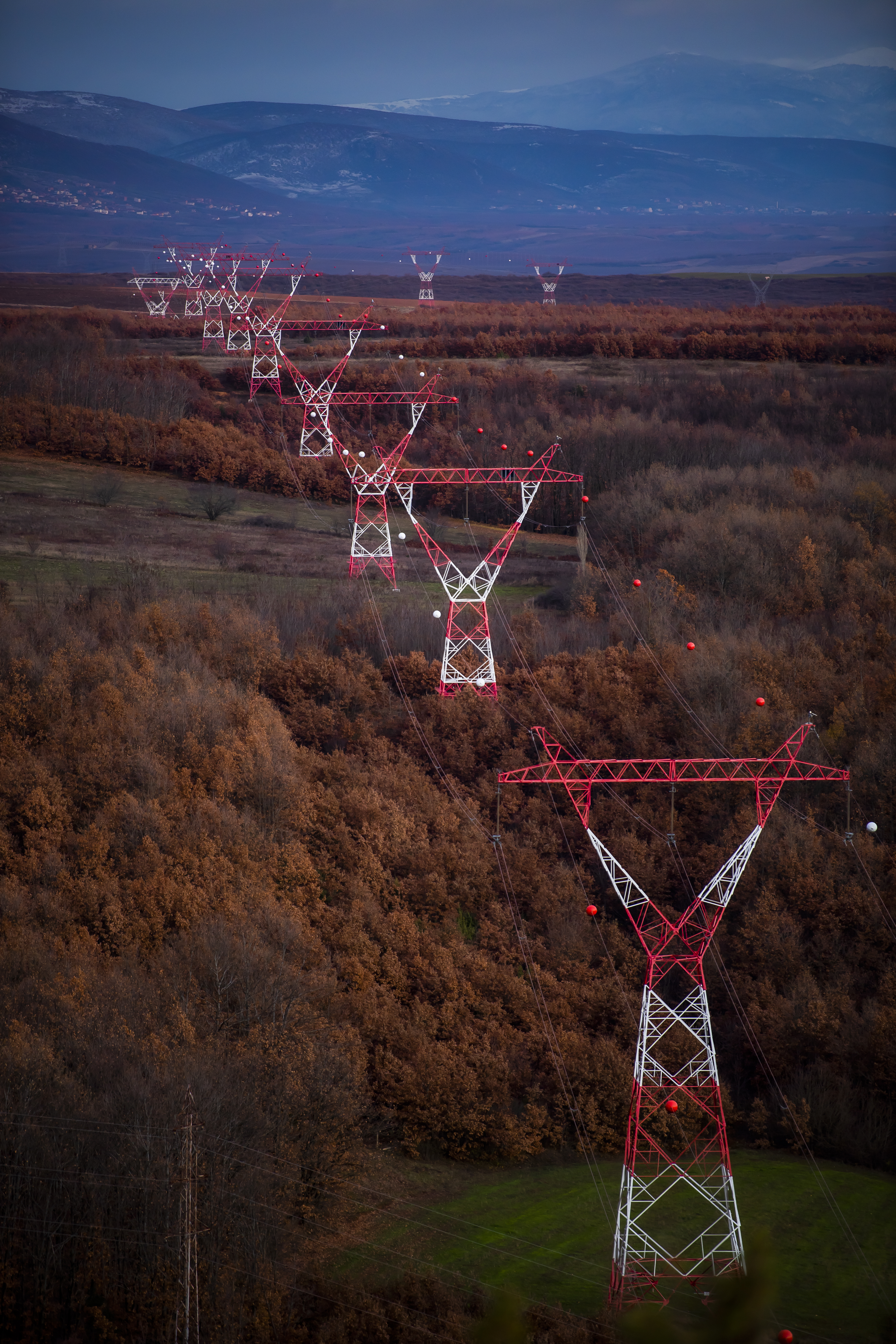
Kosovo-Albania transmission line

With that agreement Albania and Kosovo will now be able to exchange energy reserves, which is expected to result in €4 million in savings per year for Kosovo.

== Jurisdiction ==
KOSTT j.s.c is responsible for:

- Planning, developing, maintaining and operating the Kosovo electricity transmission system
- Providing non–discriminatory open access
- Operating the new electricity market
- Providing conditions that promote competition within Kosovo
- Working with neighboring TSOs for the benefit of Kosovo and the region

KOSTT has a strategic position and it represents an important knot in the regional energy market. KOSTT is interconnected with four (4) other systems, namely, Albania, North Macedonia, Montenegro and Serbia.

The KOSTT j.s.c transmission system consists of 1186 km overhead lines (181 km – 400 kV; 361 km – 220 kV; and 643 km – 110 kV) and 2400 MVA of transformation capacities.

The energy sector is considered as one of the most important sectors in Kosovo. 96.8% of electricity in Kosovo is generated by Thermo Power Plants and 3.2% is generated by Hydro Power Plants.
