= Kosovo Energy Corporation =

Energy company in Kosovo

- Founded: 27 December 2005; 20 years ago
- Headquarters: Pristina, Kosovo
- Area served: Kosovo
- Services: Electricity generation, mining

Kosovo Energy Corporation J.S.C. (Albanian: Korporata Energjetike e Kosovës, abbreviated as KEK) is a company based in Kosovo engaged in generation of electricity and allied activities. Its capacity is estimated to be around 1480 MW.

The company operates with the Sibovc Coal Mine and two coal-fired power plants - Kosovo A, and Kosovo B.

== History ==
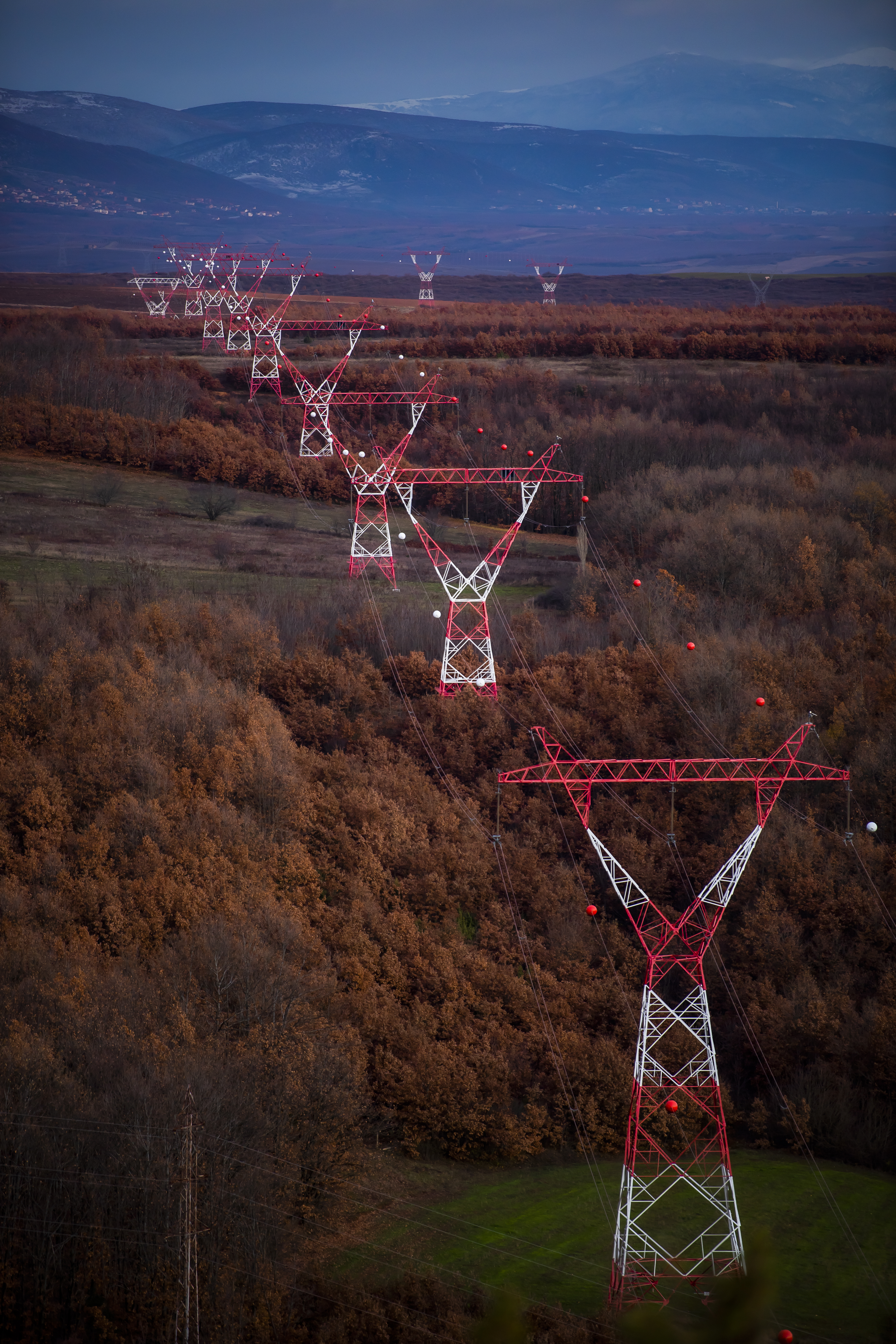
Kosovo-Albania transmission line

The Kosovo Energy Corporation was established on 27 December 2005.

On 6 June 2014, the Kosovo Energy Corporation's Kosovo A Power Station exploded killing two people and injuring thirteen others. The station was then subsequently shut down. The cause of the explosion was due to the explosion of a hydrogen tank located in a separate part of the power station from the generator.

== Capacity ==
Total electricity produced locally by Kosovo Energy Corporation:

	Type	Output	Citation
Kosovo A Power Station	Coal	800 MW	
Kosovo B Power Station	Coal	680 MW	

== See also ==
- Electrical energy in Kosovo
- KOSTT
- Kosovo Electricity Distribution and Supply
- List of companies of Kosovo
