= Kitka Wind Farm =

Wind farm in Kamenica, Kosovo

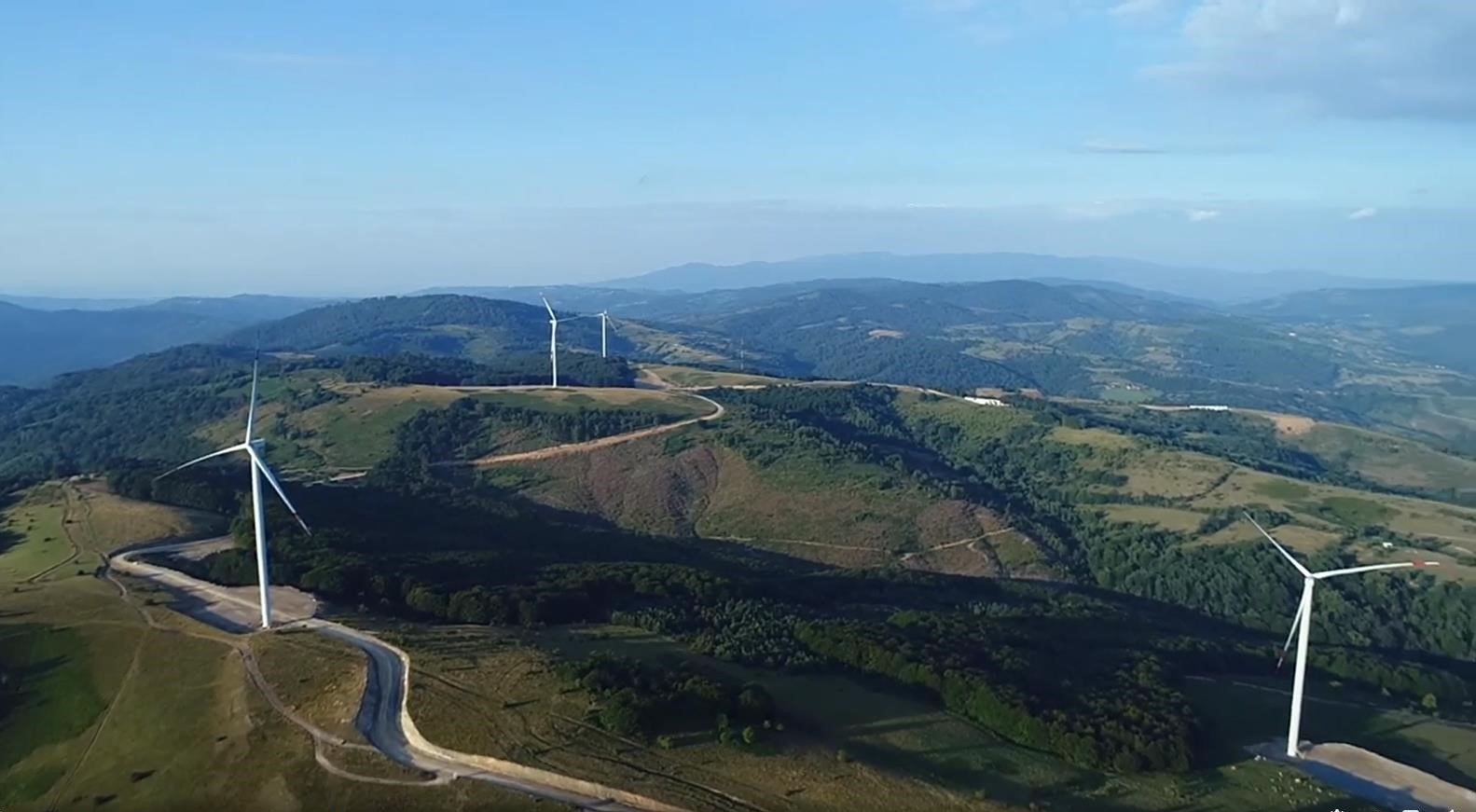
- Official name: Parku i Erës Kitkë
- Country: Kosovo
- Location: Kitkë, Kamenica
- Coordinates: 42°39′21″N 21°39′59″E
- Status: Operational
- Commission date: 2018
- Construction cost: EUR 73 million

Wind farm
- Type: Onshore
- Hub height: 110 m
- Rotor diameter: 137 m

Power generation
- Units operational: 9 x 3.6 MW
- Make and model: General Electric Energy 3.6-137
- Nameplate capacity: 32.4 MW
- Annual net output: 95.6 GW·h

External links
- Commons: Related media on Commons

The Kitka Wind Farm is the first wind farm in Kosovo. It has a nameplate capacity of 32.4 MW and it is estimated to have a total annual output of electricity of 95.6 GWh and supply enough clean energy to power 10,000 households. The project was commissioned in October 2018.

The Kitka Wind Farm has 9 units of GE 3.6-137 turbines, each with 3.6 MW nameplate capacity from the supplier, GE Renewable Energy.

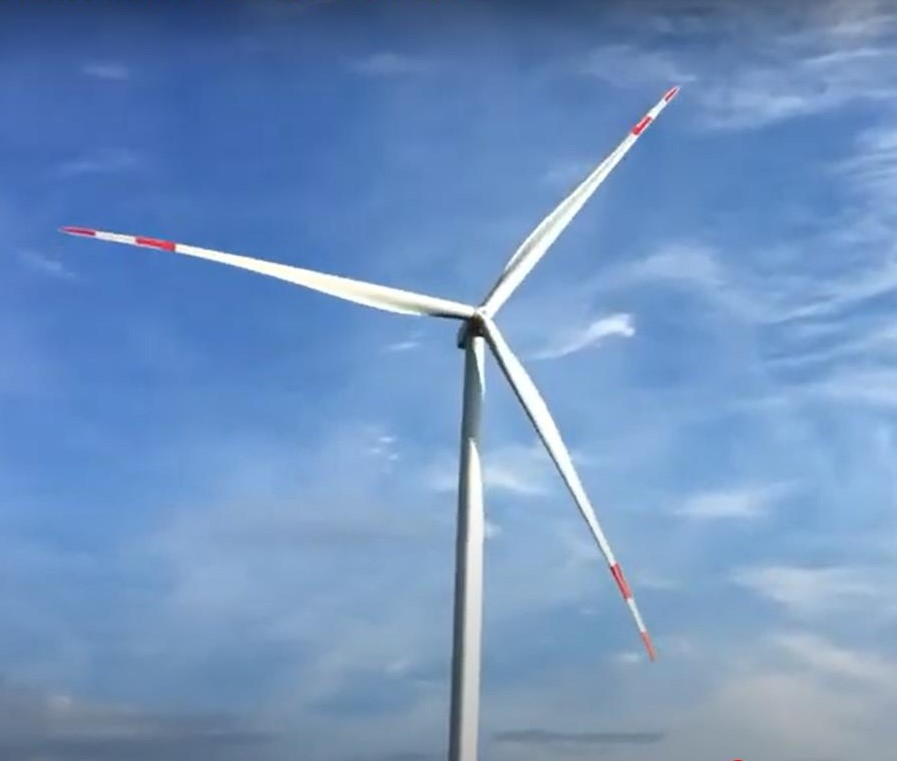
One of the wind turbines of the Kitka Wind Farm

In 2020, Kosovo's power transmission system operator KOSTT said it had signed a connection agreement for a 20 MW expansion of the Kitka wind farm.

== See also ==
- Electrical energy in Kosovo
- Bajgora Wind Farm
- List of power stations in Kosovo
