= Environmental issues in Pristina =

Pristina, the capital of the Republic of Kosovo, is the country's most populated city, with more than 200,000 inhabitants. Its air pollution level are similar to those of Beijing, Mumbai and New Delhi. The main sources of Pristina's air pollution include power plant emissions during energy production, household emissions and traffic.

== Air pollution in Pristina ==
Air in Pristina is polluted mainly from:

- Particulate Matter – PM_{10}, PM_{2.5} (Dust)
- Gases – NO_{2}, SO_{2}, CO, O_{3}

=== Sources of air pollution ===
The main sources of air pollution in Pristina are:

- Traffic emissions from diesel fuelled old vehicles with limited emission control
- Thermal power plants "Kosovo A" and "Kosovo B" (fueled with lignite) located in Obiliq, 10 km west of Pristina
- Residential houses (wood, wood-waste, lignite coal)
- District heating system operated by "Termokos"

==== Gases ====
NO_{x} The main nitrogen oxide found in the air in Pristina is nitrogen oxide (NO). NO affects the color of textile materials, causes corrosion in metallic materials, and causes the wilting of leaves in vegetation. NO_{2} is 4 times more lethal than NO, and it is mostly concentrated in urban areas. NO_{2} in Pristina is 52% from transport sector, 28% from emissions for energy production, and 11% from industry. Pristina has a lower annual average of NO_{2} emission as compared to the annual average limit allowed.

Nitrogen dioxide (NO_{2})-annual average for 2010 and 2011
	2010	2011
Annual average value limit for protection of materials	40 μg/m^{3}	
Pristina-KHMI	20.82	-

Annual average of NO_{2} in Pristina

The annual average of NO_{2} emission in Pristina was 20.82 μg/m^{3} in 2010, lower than limit of 40 μg/m^{3}. There is no available data for 2011, which means no comparison can be made between 2010 and 2011. However, with only 68% of data being valid, this means that the emission of NO_{2} may not be accurate. On the other hand, according to a study by the National Institute of Public Health of Kosovo, the emission of NO_{2} is alarming; in only three months, NO_{2} measurement exceeded allowed emissions by 18 times. The emission of NO_{2} is higher in winter, where the heating process is accelerated, with February being the peak month. The main contributor to the pollution of air with NO_{2} are Kosovo A and B power plants. Thus, NO_{2} emission is estimated to be higher in urban areas where traffic is enormous. However, in Pristina, the NO_{2} limit that would cause health problems in people's life is not exceeded; this may not apply for other cities near Pristina.

SO_{2}

Sulphur dioxide (SO_{2})-annual average(including the winter season 01.10-31.03)2010 and 2011
	2010	2011
The limit value for vegetation protection annual average(including the winter 01.10-31.03)	20 μg/m^{3}	
Pristina, KHMI	11.23	-

Annual average values of SO_{2} in Pristina

CO_{2}

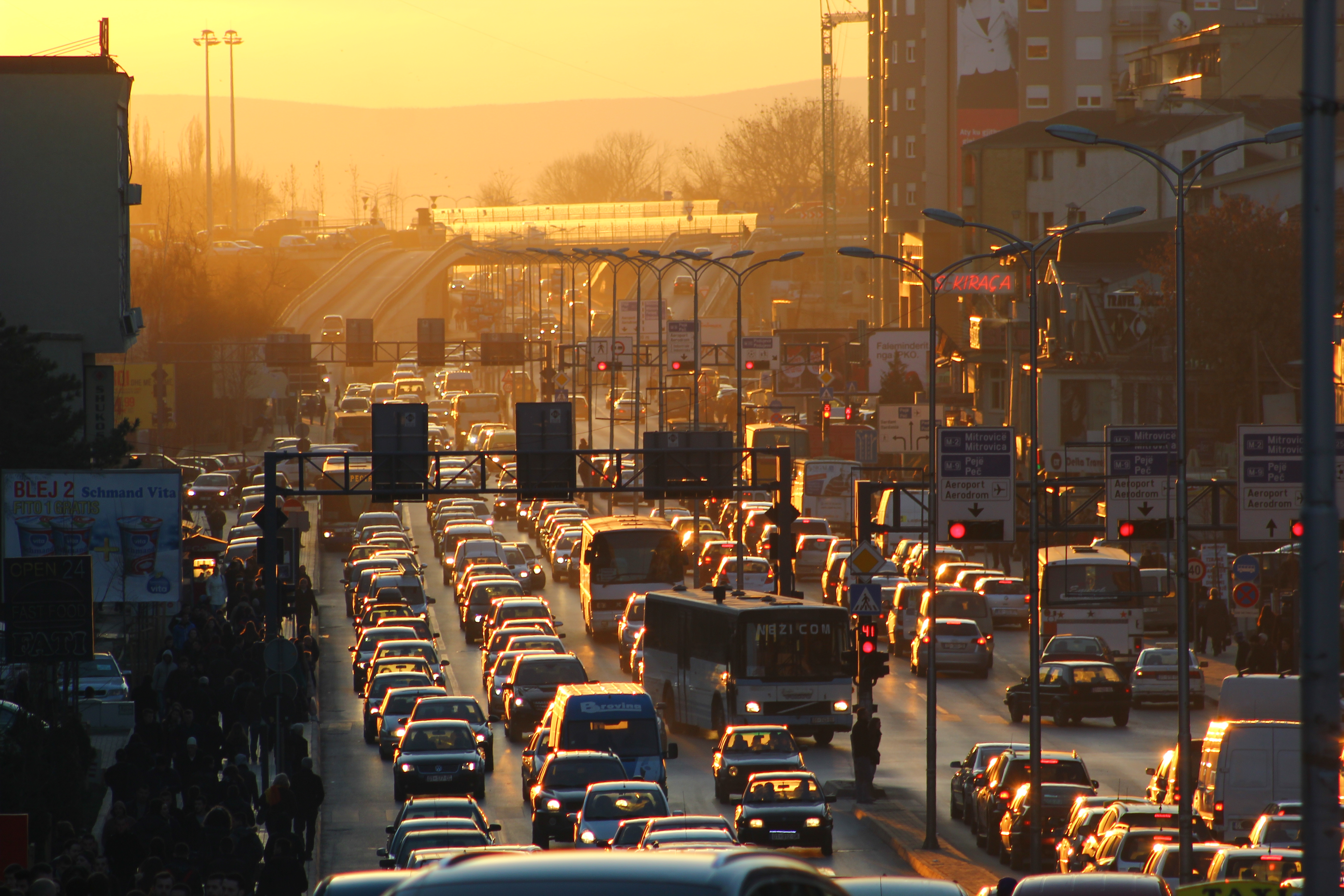
Pristina at sunset

Vehicles and fuel burning companies are the main sources of CO_{2} in Pristina. Fuel burning includes liquid fuels, natural gas and wood, combustion of coal, and industrial processes such as furnaces, paper factories, the refineries, and facilities for production of construction materials. CO_{2} emission in air can be mitigated through plants; however, this is another problem in Pristina. The lack of green spaces and well-maintained parks makes the mitigation of CO_{2} impossible. The highest pollutant is the production of energy, with Pristina's annual CO_{2} contribution to global warming being 5.5 million tons. CO_{2} pollution comes 30% from fuel use for power generation, 29% from transport, 20% from industry, 15% from residential commerce, and 6% from other sources. If Pristina is compared with regional countries, it is noticed that Pristina exceeds the OSCE and EU emissions of CO_{2}. Pristina has higher emission of CO_{2} compared to the region of Serbia, and lower emissions compared to the region of Bosnia and Herzegovina.

==== Particulate matter (dust) ====
PM emission on air comes mainly from transportation in Pristina. The problem lies in the significant increase of automobiles in Pristina, where most are old and do not possess catalytic converters. Pristina's cars' life spans range from 5 years to more than 15 years. 7.5% of registered cars are newer than 5 years old, 77.36% are older than 10 years, and 66.82% of them are more than 15 years old. Furthermore, each day in Pristina, an enormous number of cars enter, creating traffic as well as air pollution. Out of the total number of vehicles registered in Kosovo, 31.18% of them are registered in Pristina; 84% are passenger's vehicles, 13% are from transporting, and the others come mainly from urban traffic. The public transportation in Pristina contains mainly buses exported from other countries. There are 757 licensed buses routes per day and out of these 382 are executed on average per day. Buses/minibuses connecting urban and suburban areas total 151 with 935 departures per day.

There are two main stations in Pristina that measure the air pollution, the Kosovo Hydro Meteorological Institute (IHMK) and Rilindja.

PM_{10}

PM_{10} number of days with exceeded daily limit value for 2010 and 2011	2010	2011
Daily limit value	50 μg/m^{3}	
Number of days with exceedances within a year	35days	
Pristina IHMK	99	68*
Pristina Rilindja	69*	92*

Number of days with exceeded limit values of PM_{10}

As can be seen from the table, the maximum amount allowed to be exceeded with PM10 is 35 days, and the maximum daily value is 50 μg/m^{3}. However, according to KHMI, Pristina exceeded this limit for 99 days in 2010 and for 68 days in 2011. The majority of days with exceedance of average daily values were during the winter months. The table below presents PM_{10} maximum, minimum, and average monthly values, where November is the month with the highest recorded PM_{10} value.

PM_{10}	Average	Max	Min
Sep	51.7	83.1	24.1
Oct	50.6	128.2	10.6
Nov	153.84	278.63	37.97
Dec	53.23	141.79	16.96
Jan	54.45	155.9	14.07
Feb	51.84	125.98	16.05
Mar	49.74	73.05	24.19

Monthly average values, max and min. of PM_{10}, IHMK station (Pristina 1)

The annual limit of (40 μg/m^{3}) was also exceeded in 2010 and 2011, as it can be seen from figure 2. The highest pollution value reached from traffic in Pristina was estimated to be 75.74 μg/m^{3}, which is 1.9 times more than the average annual limit.

PM_{2.5}

PM_{2.5} Annual average
	2010	2011
Annual limit value	50 μg/m^{3}	
Pristina Rilindje	37.34	40.04

Annual Average of PM_{2.5}

The average annual emission of PM_{2.5} is 25 μg/m^{3}. However, Pristina has exceeded this limit in 2010 and 2011. Furthermore, the PM_{2.5} concentration has increased from 37.34 μg/m^{3} in 2010 to 40.40 μg/m^{3}in 2011. The highest value of PM2.5 has been recorded in the winter months, with November leading among other months.

PM_{2.5}	Average	Max	Min
Nov	93.88	148.87	26.02
Dec	39.31	110.2	13.73
Jan	44.38	144.74	11.38
Feb	41.97	110.3	10.23
Mar	32.36	46.61	18.93

Monthly average values, max and min. of PM_{2.5}, station IHMK (Pristina1)

==== Kosovo A and B Power Plants ====
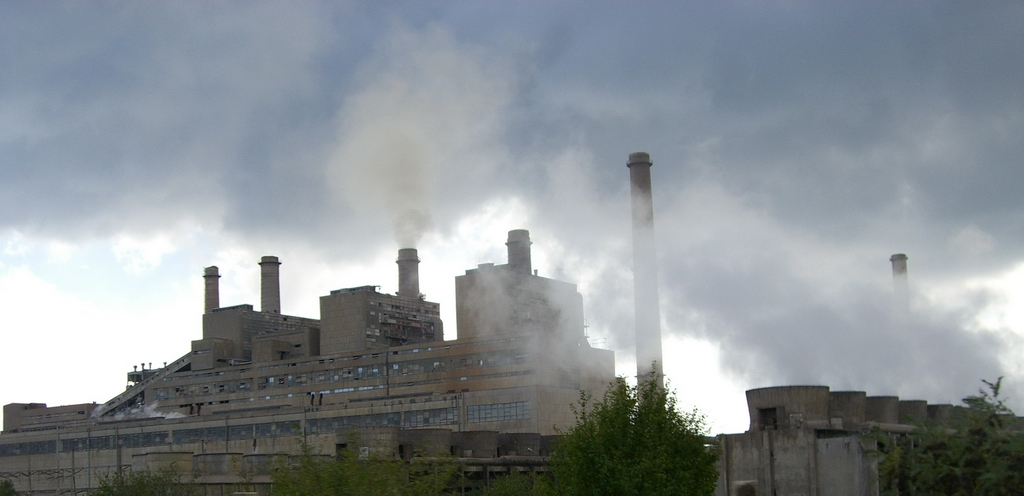
Thermal power plants Kosovo A+B in Obiliq

Kosovo A and B power plants are the number one pollutant of Kosovo and Pristina region. It is the primary factor contributing to the pollution of air with the above-mentioned gasses. The power plants located in Obiliq produce 97% of the electrical energy used in Pristina, while only 3% comes from hydropower. There is no continuous emission monitoring system from those two plants. However, lower emissions have been reported in Kosovo B compared to Kosovo A. Kosovo A has three blocks, A_{1}, A_{3}, A_{5}, and Kosovo B has two blocks B_{1} and B_{2}. According to the state report for environmental conditions in Kosovo, both power plants have exceeded the SO_{2} limits in air, that of 400 mg/Nm3, and the NO_{2} limit that of 500 mg/Nm3, and dust emission limit that of 50 mg/Nm3. CO_{2} emission from Kosovo A is lower than from power plant Kosovo B, as it can be seen in the table below.

	2007	2008	2009	2010	2011	2012
Kosovo A	2,087,938	2,008,196	2,364,253	2,848,117	2,893,087	2,762,053
Kosovo B	3,636,361	4,338,011	4,689,615	4,249,301	3,463,901	3,314,555
Sum	5,724,299	6,346,207	7,053,868	7,097,418	6,356,988	6,076,608

CO_{2} emissions from power plants Kosovo A and B in Pristina

Electro filters are planned to be established in A_{3}, A_{4} and A_{5} with the aim to increase the efficiency of the existing electro filters. The plant's CO_{2} emissions are more than 6 million tons annually, which means 520 tons per hour. When Kosovo A+B produces energy at full capacity (200 MW), it emits 25 tons of dust and ash (that includes gases) per hour, which is 74 times more than the European limit. Critical months are deemed April, June, July, October, November and December, where the emission of gases and dust exceeds the limit allowed.

Facts from Ministry of Environment and Spatial Planning in Kosovo (2006):

- Greenhouse gasses: 10,797,000 tons of CO_{2} and 425,000 t of CH_{4}
- CO emissions: 986,000 tons
- Dust emissions: 167,000 t with specific values from 1,881mg/m^{3} to 7,523 mg/m^{3} at Kosovo A and 250 mg/m^{3} at Kosovo B
- SO_{2} emissions: 167,000 t with specific values of 895 mg/m^{3}
- NO_{x} Emission: 20,000 t with specific values from 358 mg/m^{3} to 478 mg/m^{3} at Kosovo A and 735 mg/m^{3} at Kosovo B.

The Ministry of Environment has concluded that the problem with dust emitted from those two power plants is serious and it cannot be avoided without major redesign of the boilers. Plant units in Kosovo A need serious assessment since they are at the end of their lifespan. On the other hand, Kosovo B has a longer lifespan, but the existing electrostatic precipitator is in very bad conditions and also there is low control of dust emission in the air. The European Union has set some targets that those power plants shall reach by 2017. Dust emission should be max 50 mg/Nm^{3}, SO_{2} max 400 mg/Nm^{3}, and NO_{2} max 500 mg/Nm^{3}.

Pollutant	Kosovo A	Kosovo B	Limit value	Limit to be achieved by
Dust	902.32	156.35	50	31 Dec 2017
SO_{2}	251.42	208.55	400	31 Dec 2017
NO_{2}	705.75	835.08	500	31 Dec 2017

Air pollutants released in 2006 from Power Plants Kosovo A and B

==== District Heating and Household Heating ====
The district heating company "Termokos" operates a network covering some neighborhoods in the center of Pristina. An extension is foreseen. This company operates a heating station fueled with oil and gas, while a cogeneration system is considered a stable solution for the improvement of the heating system in Pristina. District heating is offered only in three cities in Kosovo, whereas approximately 3–4% of households are connected.

Some challenges related with District heating are:

- Loss of hot water (energy) in the distribution network
- Non-coverage of entire city with district heating
- No use of renewable energy such as solar heating
- Pollutants emitted in the air

Pollutant	Termokos	Limit
SO_{2}	491.0	400 mg/Nm^{3}

SO_{2} pollution from Termokos (2006)

However, private households in Pristina use mainly wood, wastewood and residual waste for heating, burned in old ovens without filters and low burning temperatures. Thus, air pollutants, dust and smell end up in the urban air and worsen the situation. Heating material is secured from public vegetation. This problem could be reduced if district heating challenges would be solved, and each house in Pristina would be abandoned from firing heating materials, which are cut from woods and bushes in the region. In turn, more vegetation would decrease the air pollution as well.

== Water ==
Pristina City has limited quantities of surface waters and groundwaters, which are mainly distributed to peripheral areas. A small fraction of the available water is underground water, such as the Pajtimi field source that amounts to 50 litres/sec and the "Germia" source with 15 litres/sec. Watercourses are scarce. There are small rivers in the urban area, such as Pristina River and Vellusha River that collect the water flows of creeks coming from Lagjia e Spitalit, Mati, Kodra e Trimave, and Vellusha. Pristina Rivers serve to collect rainwater from all urban areas of Pristina.

The main drinking water sources remain Batllava and Badovc Lakes. Batllava Lake has a capacity of 38 million m^{3} of water. With 65% of drinking water, Batllava represents the main source of drinking water for the municipality of Pristina. It was built in 1960-1963; initially it worked only for technical water supply to the Power plant complex in Obiliq. From 1982 it turned into water resource for drinking water for the Pristina region. Recently, the drinkwater treatment plant in Shajkovc was built, which has a maximum capacity of 900 liters/sec. Badovci Lake has a volume of 27 million m^{3} and supplies the town of Pristina with 35% of drinking water. It was initially built in 1960 for the supply of drinking water, irrigation, and technical water for Kishnica mine. From 1980 this lake is mainly used for drinking water purposes for Pristina region. The drinkwater treatment plant has been built in Badovc, which has a maximum capacity of 400 liters/sec. Those two lakes are the main source of potable water in Pristina. They both supply around 90% of population in Pristina region with drinking water.

However, the distribution network has many problems. Most of the pipes used are older than 50 years, which lose around 50% of available water; 35% are technical losses, while 15% are commercial losses. As a result, there are shortages on available water to citizens, with 8-10 hours/day water cuts to each household. A problem is the water contamination. There is no urban water monitoring in Kosovo. There are only regional water companies that do not have capacities on drinking water monitoring.

=== Contamination in waterbodies ===
Wastewater discharges remain the main pollutants of water in Pristina. Those wastes are dangerous because they contain substances such as soluble compounds of phosphorus, dissolved oxygen, pathogenic bacteria and viruses, nitrogen (eutrophication), and other matters that affect the water quality. Main carrier of underground waters pollution is Prishtevka River, which at the same time is the main carrier of sewage and rainwater.

There are two major pollutors of waterbodies in Pristina, collective pollutors and commercial pollutors. Collective polluters are households and individuals that throw waste and wastewater in waterbodies or common canalization system. Industries are the largest commercial pollutants, such as agriculture, chemicals, and ironmongery. To Prishtevka River, there are six commercial and one collective pollutor. To Llapi River there are 15 collective and seven commercial pollutors. Sitnica River has 24 collective and seven commercial pollutors, and Gracanka River has three collective and one commercial polluter. The table below shows the individual pollutants in Pristina and their landfills.

Municipality	Pollutant Name	Action	Receiving waterbody
Pristina	"Auto Parkingu"	Autopark Ironmongery	Prishtevke
Pristina	"Erona Riciklim"	Ironmongery	Prishtevke
Pristina	"Idea"	Food Industry	Prishtevke
Pristina	"Kosova Tex"	Textile Industry	Prishtevke
Pristina	"Kualiteti"	Slaughterhouse	Prishtevke
Pristina	"Trafiku Urban"	Autopark Oficine	Underground water
Pristina	"NTP Vjosa"	Food Industry	Prishtevke

Commercial Water Pollutors in Pristina

=== Sewage waters ===
In the city of Pristina the sewer system is intended to lead wastewater out of the city center but there is no controlled treatment of sewage waters. Waste waters are disposed towards rivers. Sitnica River is the main receiver of sewage waters coming from citizens of Pristina with a total amount of water discharged 800 litres/sec, from which 450 liter/sec come through Pristina River and 150 litres/sec through Vellusha River. Other amounts are taken through Shkabaj creek. There are only 8 settlements in Pristina with public or private canalization system. The table below presents selected districts of Pristina and their sewage waters dump sites.

	District	Inhabitants	Receiving waterbody
Pristina	"Qyteti"	43024.5	Prishtevke
Pristina	"Bardhosh"	2150	Lumi Llap
Pristina	"Barileve"	4200	Lumi Llap
Pristina	"Besi"	907	Lumi Llap
Pristina	"Hajvali"	6000	Gracanke
Pristina	"Prroni i njelmet"	1000	Underground water
Pristina	"Prugovc-Leban"	800	Lumi Llap
Pristina	"Shkabaj"	1500	Sitnice
Pristina	"Trude"	540	Lumi Llap
Pristina	"Vranidoll"	870	Lumi Llap

Waterbody pollution in Pristina districts

As depicted in the table, the most polluted river with sewage waters is Prishtevka, with more than 400,000 inhabitants polluting it. Wastewaters are present also in Taukbashçe Park, causing smell and immission in the park under which elderly park visitor may suffer.

=== Underground waters ===
Considering the problem of Pristina to sufficiently supply its citizens with water, underground water has been thought to be a solution for this problem. Kolevica underground waters have been the main water supplier for Pristina from 1950 to 1970. Those waters are placed in the northern side of Pristina, with a maximum capacity of 50 litres/sec. However, with the construction of Batllava River, those underground rivers were left unused, and now they form part of the polluted waters in Pristina. Germia Source is another underground water resource that lies in Germia Park ad is the oldest water sources known. It has been used many years ago, and it has a flow of 15 litres/sec. This source is used for Germia Basis, while in those days Germia's underground waters are considered to be the main source of water for Pristina citizens.

=== Wells in Pristina ===
There are hidden wells in Pristina, which most of them are covered with waste and are in the most polluted areas of Pristina. These sources are used when surface water is lacking. Recently, water has been found in "Pajtimi" field, which currently is one of the waste polluted areas. However, in an attempt to clean Pristina environment and also find water, the opening phase of these wells has started and they are estimated to be completed by mid-2014. In this place, 9 wells are found, and the flow is estimated at 60 litres/sec.

There are two other wells in Llukar village. Those wells are estimated to have a flow of 50 litres/sec. The problem with those two wells is their usage, mainly for auto washing. Those wells ceased being used in 1989, and they are expected to become active again by mid-2014.

A plan to plant trees in Pristina and lower air pollution has prompted that 17 artificial wells to be opened in Pristina. The Pristina municipal government has provided funding for these wells, which would supply the water the irrigation of the newly planted trees.

=== Law on water protection ===
For more information visit: Kosovo Law on Water

== Waste ==
The region of Pristina produces a high amount of waste. In 2007, 61.644.35 ton of waste have been collected only in Pristina, while in 2008, 80.185.06 tons of waste has been collected in Pristina.

No	Sanitarian Disposal	Jan	Feb	Mar	Apr	May	Jun	Jul	Aug	Sep	Oct	Nov	Dec	Total (ton)
1	Pristina	3665.45	4273.73	5032.07	5017.46	5239.63	4854.54	4938.13	5264.28	5005.82	6256	6413	5703.9	61664.35

No	Sanitarian Disposal	Jan	Feb	Mar	Apr	May	Jun	Jul	Aug	Sep	Oct	Nov	Dec	Total (ton)
1	Pristina	5904.90	5826.06	6250.23	6665.96	6377.97	7032.28	7712.59	7242.91	6114.45	7423.37	6351.12	7278.22	80185.06

Waste Collection in Pristina 2007 and 2008

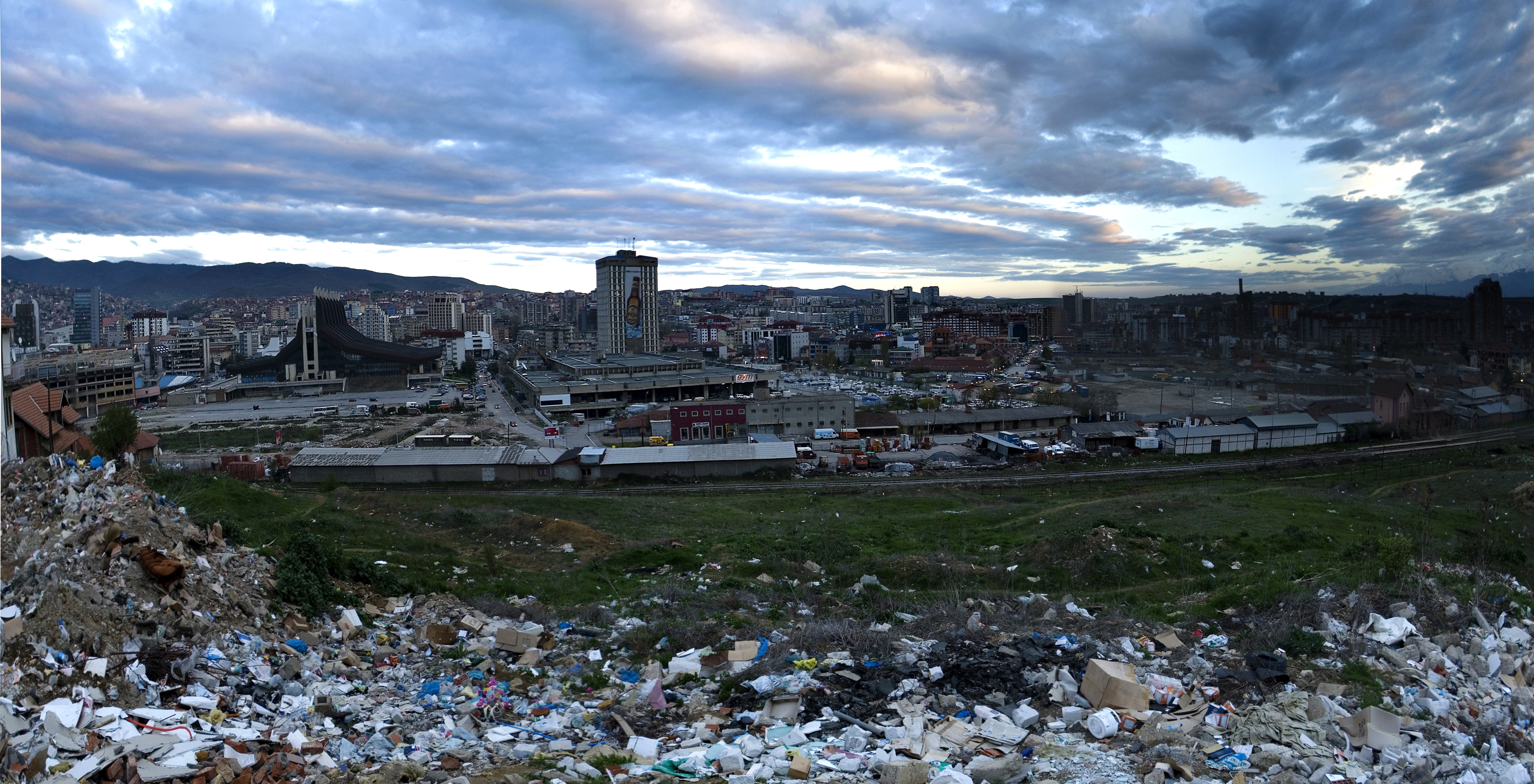
Wild Landfill in Arberia district

The average amount of municipal waste disposal in Pristina is 0.9kg/day per person, while 332kg/year per person. If Pristina is compared with other municipalities, it can be seen that Pristina differs much more. in other municipalities this average is 95kg/year per person. The problem relies in the disposal of this waste is done in (field-waste) municipal surface. Those waste disposals have not filled the minimum standard requirements for waste. They are settled near habitats and rivers, which most of time end up polluting the rivers also, especially underground waters and wells. Oftentimes those waste disposals are burned from nature, as well as from people. During summer they smell badly because most of waste is not even covered with grit. Some disposals in Pristina have been closed, with the aim to reduce those negative effects in the nature; however, still most of them remain uncovered.

Pristina regional waste disposal collects waste from Prishtinë, Obiliq, Lipjan, Fushë Kosovë and Drenas(Gllogoc). The size of this disposal is approximately 40 hectares, it has a life span of 15 years, and its total capacity is 3,500,000 m^{3} while its monthly capacity is 6000 tons. The status of this disposal is miserable, with a very bad smell causing many health implications to people.

=== Local waste ===
As the capital city of Kosovo, Pristina has the largest number of inhabitants, which in turn means that it has the largest amount of waste disposal. Generation, collection, treatment, and elimination of waste in Pristinais done by "Pastrimi" Company, which covers the highest percentage of people with this service compared to other municipalities. In 2007 this company covered 64% of the population with this service, in 2008 52%, in 2009 53%, and in 2010 55%. Collection of waste is done through two ways: 52% door-to-door collection and 48% for collective apartments.

Vendi i grumbullimit	Banesa kolektive	Dere me dere	Gjithsej
Njesia	1000 ton		
Prishtina dhe religjioni	99,496	149,336	248,832

=== Waste collection in Pristina ===
In 2012, local yearly waste per capita was 515kg, while daily waste per capita was 1.4kg. The total amount of waste collected in Pristina is 248,832 ton. (cite 37) The collection of local waste in Pristina has increased from 2007 to 2012. In 2007 182,000 ton were collected, while in 2012 249,000 ton were collected. This is an example of an increase in the efficiency of waste collection. If Pristina is compared with the other regions, the collection of waste per capita is much higher. Only in 2012, the difference between Pristina and other regions collection of waste was 0.7kg.

=== Industrial waste ===
Industrial waste contains substances in various aggregate forms that remained for a long time in different facilities, warehouses, and industrial units. Over time, the usage of some of these substances has expired or degraded by changing their composition, making them as highly hazardous substances for people's health.

Type of waste	Quantity / Unit	Location	Municipality
Waste and solid chemical substances	49045 m^{3}	Kosova A	Pristina
Waste and solid chemical substances	186 tons	Kosova A	Pristina
Radioactive sources	34 units	Kosova A	Pristina
Radioactive waste	184 Americium rings	"Pallati i rinise"	Pristina
Solid chemicals	231.8 kg	"Laboratori ne Kishnice"	Pristina
Plastic Barrels with Acid	9 items	"Laboratori ne Kishnice"	Pristina
Plastics, unknown	9 items	"Laboratori ne Kishnice"	Pristina
Substances in unlabelled bottles	15 units	"Laboratori ne Kishnice"	Pristina

Industrial Waste in Pristina

As it can be seen, Kosovo A power plant is one of the largest pollutants with industrial waste, followed by Kishnica Laboratory.

=== Medicinal waste ===
This type of waste includes medicinal pills whose usage is not valid anymore. This sector in Pristina does not have a system of collection, transportation, or elimination. Even though new waste disposals have been set in hospital as well as in medicinal family centers, they are not being used as much. Medicinal pills are thrown in normal waste disposals. When medicinal pills stay for a long time without valid usage time, then they release dangerous substances for human's health. The Municipal Family Medicine Center in Pristina releases 60 tons/year medicinal waste. Medicinal waste is found also in some pharmacies in Pristina. The central pharmacy of Pristina has declared 200 kg of medical waste. Other pharmacies have also reported medical waste, such as the Agani Warehouse.

== Land degradation ==
The continued impact of human activities on land causes land degradation, which is harmful for human and socio-economic environment. Since Pristina is the capital city of Kosovo, most of the population lives here. This means that land degradation issue is more present in the Pristina region; however, Pristina was always industrial-oriented city, with less agricultural land used for food cultivation. Land degradation happens because of the increased construction of settlements (unplanned constructions), road construction, industry (solid waste, surface mining), local and sanitary waste, erosion and uncontrolled exploitation of gravel.

=== Land usage ===
Below are some facts for land usage in Pristina Municipality:

Constructed Land: 2365.6 hectares or 30.45% of the total surface

Residential Areas: 2011.58 hectares. It is characterized with individual residence 23.17%, with only 2.72% collective residence.

Economic Areas: 217.94 hectares or 2.81% of total constructed areas belongs to the industrial development.

Educational Institutions: occupy a surface of 34.7 hectares or 0.45% of the constructed area.

Health Institutions: occupy a surface of 33.9 hectares or 0.44% of the constructed area.

Administrative Institutions: occupy a surface of 50.08 hectares or 0.64% of the constructed area.

Green Areas: 5023.05 hectares or 64.04% of the total area.

Specific Areas: 149.11 hectares or 1.92% of the total area.

Transport and Traffic Areas: 231 hectares or 2.97% of total area.

Ownership in Pristina Municipality is divided into two groups:

Public Ownership: 2695.21 hectares or 34.7%.

Private Ownership: 5073.48 hectares or 65.3%.

=== Degradation of agricultural land ===
Pristina has 9,155 hectares of agricultural land, from which 8508 hectares are irrigated. Since Pristina has highly polluted air, it is assumed that air pollution is also harming vegetation and soil layers. This happens through rainfall that washes pollutants from air and deposits it in soil. One of the most common ways of agricultural land degradation is the transformation of agricultural land into industrial land. According to the Ministry of Agriculture, Forestry and Rural Development, in the period from 1998 to 2006 one hectare of land in Pristina was transformed. However, the construction of Pristina started the last five years, with more people building apartments in each neighborhood of Pristina.

The problem of land use re-dedication is happening with and without the permission of the municipality of Pristina. According to the Director of the Kosovo Agricultural association, land degradation is daily happening more and more, and the most endangered agricultural lands are located between Pristina and the Motorway to Skopje.

== Spatial planning ==
Spatial planning in Pristina is very important, given the enormous construction plans happening currently. The construction of collective apartments has started in Pristina the last five years, and some of them follow the directives for constructing from Pristina Municipality, but others do not. However, when dealing with spatial planning, it is very important to protect local zones from construction, especially parks that people use for recreational activities. One of the natural spatial areas protected from the municipality of Pristina is the Regional park "Germia."

=== Germia Protected Zone ===
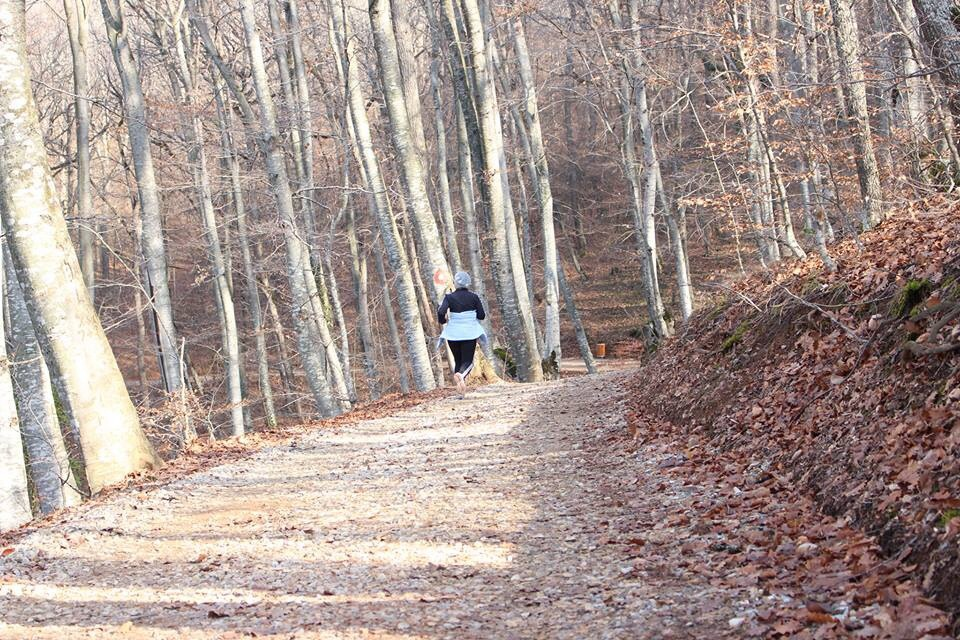
-Germia national park Pristina 2014-01-29 12-19

Germia Regional Park lies in the northern part of Pristina and has a surface of 62 km2. Due to its biodiversity in fauna and flora, the park is protected and monitored by Hortikultura Public enterprise. Construction is prohibited. 610 types of vascular flora have been found in Germia separated into 82 families. 83 types of mushrooms have been found and 4 forest communities.

Due to better air quality in the forest, most people use it as a recreational place. 4140.52 hectares of Germia are under the protected zone, starting from the Germia Basis and continue with fields, children parks and toys, and sporting centers. The status of Germia is a Protected Regional Park, including 1.126.01.00 hectares. Germia Park is evidenced as a protected zone in the international list of protected places. The boundaries of Germia are Miredita hills in the north towards the Hajvalia mining and Gracanica River. In the east the Badovci River, it continues with Busise River in the south, and vineyards in the west.

== Environmental protection measures ==
During 2011–2012, the Ministry of the Environment and Spatial Planning in Kosovo, has formulated the Strategy for the protection of the Environment in Pristina. Those strategies have been created for the future of Pristina environment in 2015-2022. Those strategies entail specific plans and EU standards that Pristina needs to fulfill by the end of year 2022. Local Plans for Environmental Actions are mandatory for each municipality in Kosovo. In Pristina, this plan has been approved and it only waits for the starting period of implementation. This plan has been taken in cooperation with the Swedish Agence for International Development. The municipality of Pristina is developing and implementing this plan for other municipalities as well. 14 plans have been established for waste management in Pristina, according to the Kosovo Law for Waste.
