= Kosovo A Power Station =

Coal-fired power plant in Kosovo

Kosovo A Power Station Termocentrali "Kosova A"
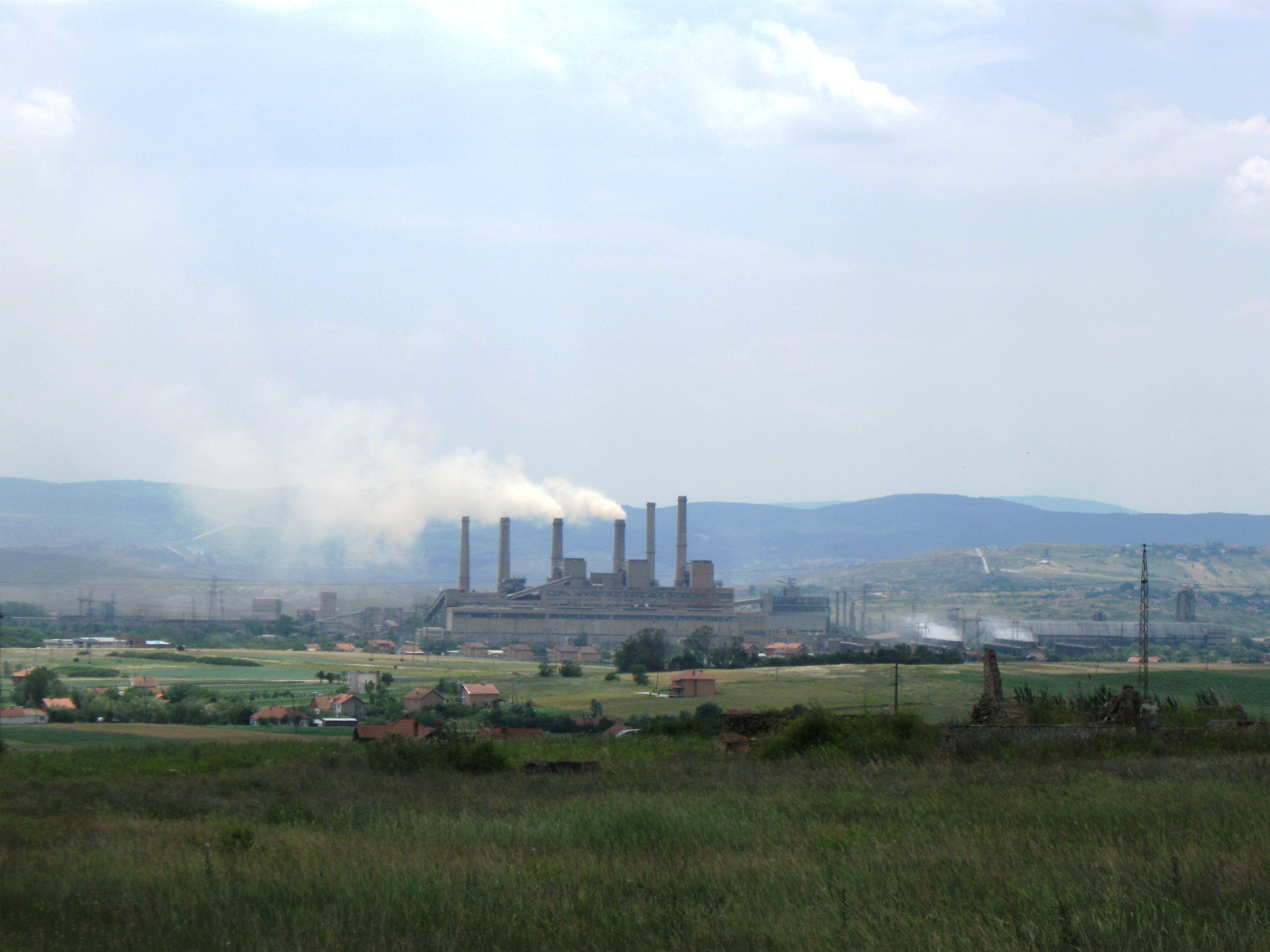
- View on Kosovo A Power Station, September 2011
- Official name: Termocentrali "Kosova A"
- Country: Kosovo
- Location: Obiliq
- Coordinates: 42°40′31″N 21°5′0″E
- Status: Operational since 1962
- Commission date: 1962; 64 years ago
- Construction cost: Between $1.5 million and $2.5 million per MW
- Operator: Kosovo Energy Corporation (KEK)

Thermal power station
- Primary fuel: Lignite

Power generation
- Units operational: 1 x 50 MW 1 x 200 MW 1 x 250 MW 1 x 350 MW
- Nameplate capacity: 800 MW
- Annual net output: 2,221 GWh (2024)

External links
- Commons: Related media on Commons

Kosovo A Power Station is a lignite-fired power station with five units in Obiliq, Kosovo. It is operated by the Kosovo Energy Corporation (KEK). With a capacity of 650 MW, it is the second largest power station in Kosovo after Kosovo B Power Station. The power station uses lignite mined from the Sibovc Coal Mine as fuel. As the water cooling source, it uses the nearby river of Lab.

In 2012, it was described as the worst single-point source of pollution in Europe. Despite plans to shut the units down in 2017, it was still partially operating as of March 2025.

== History ==
Kosovo A Power Station was opened in 1962. It was operated by EPS Surface Mining Kosovo and EPS TPP Kosovo until the end of the Kosovo War. After the UNMIK administration was established in Kosovo on 1 July 1999, Elektroprivreda Srbije (EPS) lost its access to the local coal mines and power plants, including Kosovo A and Kosovo B power plants.

Since then, it has been operated by Kosovo Energy Corporation (Albanian: Korporata Energjetike e Kosovës (KEK)).

On 6 June 2014, the power station exploded, killing two people and injuring 13 others. The station was then subsequently shut down. The cause of the explosion was due to the explosion of hydrogen tank located in a separate part of the power station from the generator.

In December 2015, US-based company ContourGlobal signed a memorandum of understanding with the Government of Kosovo, to build a new $1.06 billion power plant to replace the 45-year old Kosovo A Power Station. The construction of the new facility was expected to begin in 2018, but ContourGlobal quit the project in 2020.

== Generation units ==
- Unit 1 has a generation power of 50 MW and a 120 metres (390 ft) tall chimney with a diameter of 4 metres (13 ft) at the top.
- Unit 2 has a generation power of 200 MW and a 120 metres (390 ft) tall chimney with a diameter of 7 metres (23 ft) at the top.
- Unit 3 has a generation power of 250 MW and a 120 metres (390 ft) tall chimney with a diameter of 7 metres (23 ft) at the top.
- Unit 4 has a generation power of 350 MW and a 150 metres (490 ft) tall chimney with a diameter of 7 metres (23 ft) at the top.

== See also ==
- Kosovo B Power Station
- Electrical energy in Kosovo
- List of power stations in Kosovo
