= Kosovo B Power Station =

Coal-fired power plant in Kosovo

Kosovo B Power Station Termocentrali "Kosova B"
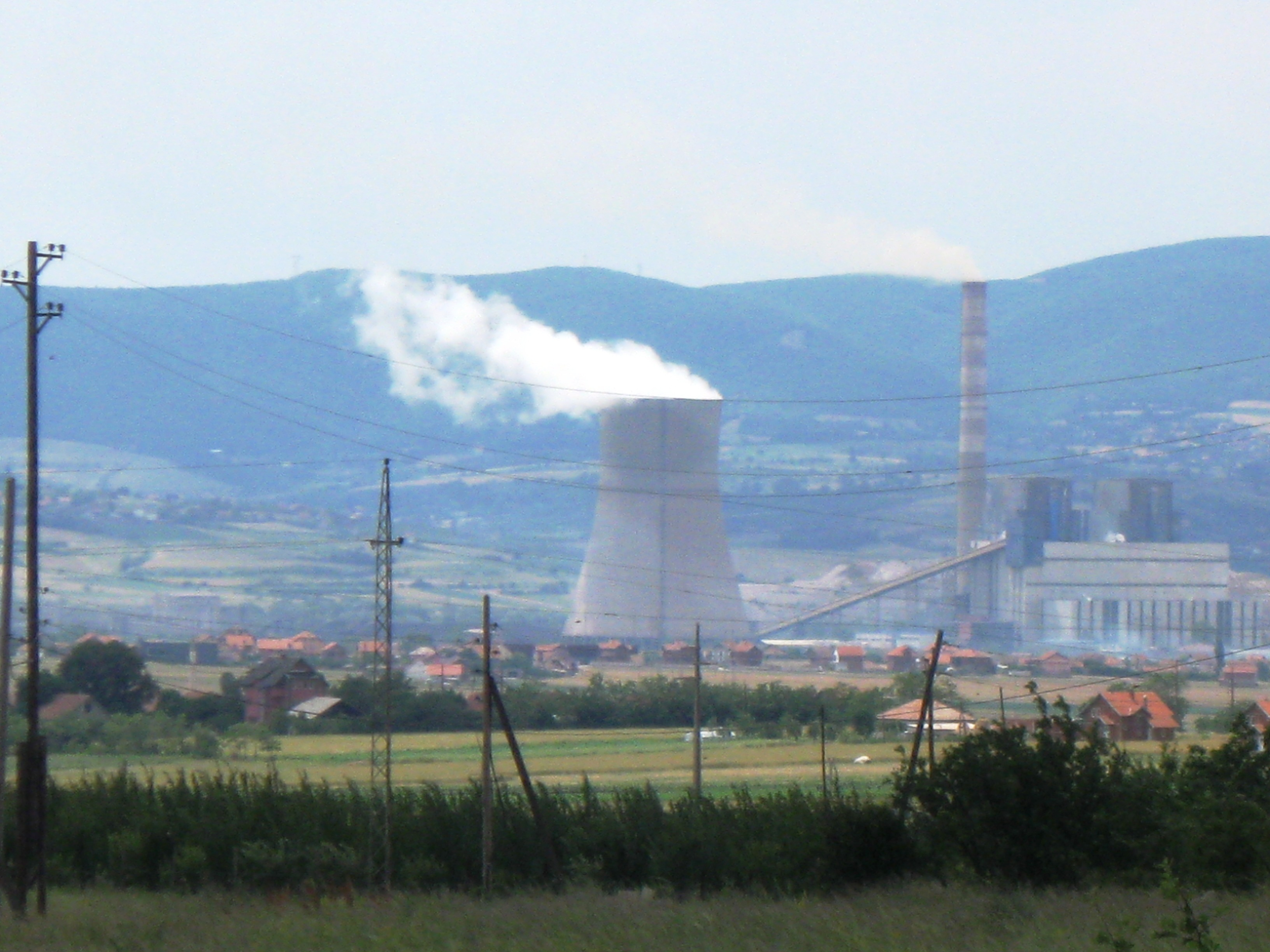
- View on Kosovo B Power Station, September 2011
- Official name: Termocentrali Kosova B
- Country: Kosovo
- Location: Obiliq
- Coordinates: 42°41′44″N 21°3′0″E
- Status: Commissioned
- Construction began: 1976
- Commission date: 1983; 43 years ago
- Operator: Kosovo Energy Corporation (KEK)

Thermal power station
- Primary fuel: Lignite

Power generation
- Units operational: 2 units
- Nameplate capacity: 680 MW
- Annual net output: 3,957 GWh (2024)

External links
- Commons: Related media on Commons

Kosovo B Power Station is a lignite-fired power station located in Obiliq, Kosovo. It is operated by the Kosovo Energy Corporation (KEK). At 680 MW, it is the largest power station in Kosovo by nameplate capacity. The power station consists of two units with a nameplate capacity of 340 MW each. The units share a 183-metre (600 ft) chimney with a 6.8-metre (22 ft) diameter at the top.

The power station uses lignite mined from the Sibovc Coal Mine as fuel. As the water cooling source, it uses the nearby water canal of Ibar-Lepenac.

== Energy strategy ==
The Republic of Kosovo's Energy Strategy for 2022–2031 outlines investment in the country's lignite-fired generation capacity to support system resilience and comply with emissions standards. It includes refurbishing the Kosovo B1 and B2 power plant units to support energy supply security and reduce emissions. The strategy planned the refurbishment in two stages, with the aim of completing B1 by the end of 2025 and B2 by 2026. Following these upgrades, both units were projected to operate more efficiently and reliably, in line with mandatory emissions standards under the Industrial Emissions Directive.

In April 2023, KEK signed an agreement with General Electric worth €56.2 million to modernize the steam turbines at Kosovo B. The modernization project was intended to extend the operating life of the plant's turbines, reduce coal consumption per unit of electricity produced, and increase annual output by more than 600 GWh. In August 2025, Kosovo's Ministry of Economy announced the completion of modernization works at unit B2, including turbine modernization, replacement of generator busbars, repair of an electrical circuit breaker, replacement of the economizer, and repair of the gas duct. The ministry said the work was expected to increase B2 output by 35 MW.

== History ==
Kosovo B Power Station was opened in 1983. It was operated by EPS Surface Mining Kosovo and EPS TPP Kosovo until the end of the Kosovo War. After the UNMIK administration was established in Kosovo on July 1, 1999, Elektroprivreda Srbije (EPS) lost access to the local coal mines and power plants, including Kosovo A and Kosovo B.

Since then, the plant has been operated by Kosovo Energy Corporation (Albanian: Korporata Energjetike e Kosovës (KEK)).

As of 2020, Kosovo B and Kosovo A were described as among the most polluting power plants in Europe, with emissions of coarse and fine particles often exceeding limits set by the World Health Organization.

== Generation units ==
The B1 and B2 units of Kosovo B were commissioned in 1983 and 1984, respectively. Each unit has an installed capacity of 339 MW and, before the modernization programme, operated at an available capacity of about 260 MW.

== See also ==
- Kosovo A Power Station
- Electrical energy in Kosovo
- List of power stations in Kosovo
- Kosovo Energy Corporation
