= Ministry of Environment, Spatial Planning and Infrastructure (Kosovo) =

Government ministry of Kosovo

The Ministry of Environment and Spatial Planning (MESP) (Albanian: Ministria e Mjedisit dhe Planifikimit Hapsinor e Kosovës, Serbian: Министарство Средине и Просторног Планирања, Ministarstvo Sredine i Prostornog Planiranja) is a ministry within the Government of Kosovo. Its areas of responsibility include environmental protection, ensuring the provision of information about the state of environment, setting preconditions for rational use, protection and restoration of natural resources, etc. The minister of the MESP is Dardan Gashi.

The ministry has numerous divisions and subordinate institutions responsible for protected areas.

== Departments ==
=== Environmental Department ===
The Environmental Department of the MESP coordinates activities in the field of environmental protection, to promote the coherent development of policies for environmental protection; develops norms and standards and issue guidelines in the field of environmental protection with special respect to international standards; oversees the prosecution of such standards, by carrying out inspections and other services; participates in developing and implementing public information campaigns and other promotional schemes to increase public awareness, etc.

This department consists of four divisions:

1. Division of Environmental Protection Policies
2. Division of Environmental Protection
3. Division for Nature Protection
4. Waste Management Division

=== Water Department ===
The Water Department of the MESP administers the management of water resources in terms of water use, water protection and protection from the harmful water actions and also creating the water framework for waters.

=== Spatial Planning Department ===
The Spatial Planning Department of the MESP ensures the implementation of ministry policy through laws and other regulations in the field of spatial planning; coordinates and manages the affairs of the department of professional and administrative aspects.

This department includes in itself the following divisions:

1. Division of Policy and Strategy
2. Central Planning Division
3. Division of municipal planning

=== Construction Department ===
The Construction Department of the MESP handles and performs professional services; oversees legislative implementation of the Government policies in the field of housing and construction; monitors and analyzes the areas within its responsibilities; develops and proposes housing strategies, programs and measures for improving the situation in the field of housing and construction; and ensures the execution of programs and corresponding measures.

The Department is divided into three divisions:

1. Division of Housing
2. Division of Housing
3. Division of Development Policies

== Institutes ==
=== Institute for Spatial Planning ===
The Institute for Spatial Planning is an integral part of the Ministry of Environment and Spatial Planning, and together with the Department of Spatial Planning constitutes the spatial planning sector in the Government of Kosovo. It was established in October 2003 by a special act, signed by the former Minister of Environment and Spatial Planning. Within the Institute work professionals from various fields such as architects, geographers, sociologists, biologists, etc.

=== Hydrometeorology Institute of Kosovo ===
Meteorological issues of interest to Kosovo are:

- Construction and maintenance of basic network of hydrological and meteorological stations.
- Measurements and observations of the elements and phenomena.
- Hydrological, meteorological, biometeorological and hydrobiological.
- Measurements and special surveys in the field of radiation, radioactivity (in accordance with applicable law)
- Measurements and observations of atmospheric electricity and air pollution, water pollution, rainfalls under the program and unique methodology that applies to the basic network stations.
- Study, processing, storage, exchange and publication of meteorological data and results of researches in the monitoring network, etc.

== Agencies ==
=== Kosovo Cadastral Agency ===
Kosovo Cadastral Agency (KCA) was established by UN-Habitat in 2000. It is the government agency under the Ministry of Environment and Spatial Planning. The KCA is the highest authority of Cadastre, Geodesy and Cartography in Kosova. Currently, the KCA is implementing the Information System of Land and Cadastre as well as Registry of Immovable Property Rights in Kosova.

A functional cadastre system is necessary for the implementation of reconstruction, supporting the rule of law; promoting economic development and the resolution of older disputes and confusions.

In this context, the Kosovo Cadastral Agency is established in the Support Programme for Kosovo Cadastre (SPKC) (2000–2003), financially supported by Sweden, Norway and Switzerland. The main goal of the SPKC has been to develop and manage the registration of cadastre and land at the central level.

=== Kosovo Agency for Radiation Protection and Nuclear Safety ===
The foundation of the Agency for Radiation Protection and Nuclear Safety (ARPNS) was a necessity to have a responsible institution for radiation protection and nuclear safety in the Republic of Kosovo, and at the same time it was a standard and requirement determined by the European Commission. Also, Kosovo has a duty to fulfill international obligations in the field of radiation protection and nuclear safety, the obligations defined by the International Atomic Energy Agency (IAEA), an agency within the United Nations. The ARPNS is now in the way of functionality and professional capacity building to become operational in tasks performing and taking responsibilities defined by law. The objective of the ARPNS is the creation of legal basis in the field of radiation protection and nuclear safety, licensing and inspection, design and implementation strategies in this area, and creating a safe environment for healthier living.
