= List of mines in Kosovo =

This list of mines in Kosovo is subsidiary to the list of mines article and lists working, defunct and future mines in the country and is organised by the primary mineral output. For practical purposes stone, marble and other quarries may be included in this list.

== Bauxite ==
| Mine | Coordinates | Town | Owner | Dates | Comments |
|---|---|---|---|---|---|
| Grebnik mine | | Klina | Boxitet e Kosovës | | The Grebnik mine is one of the largest bauxite mines in Kosovo. The mine is located in Klina in District of Peja. The mine has reserves amounting to 3.66 million tonnes of ore grading 40.49% bauxite. |

== Coal ==
- Sibovc Coal Mine
- Bardh i Madh coal mine
- Mirash open-cast coal mine

== Gold ==
- Trpeza mine

== Lead and zinc ==
- Belo Brdo mine
- Crepulje mine
- Crnac mine
- Drazhnje mine
- Hajvalia mine
- Novo Brdo mine
- Stari Trg mine

== Magnesium ==
- Goleš mine
- Strezovc mine

== Nickel ==
- Dushkaja mine
- Gllavica mine
- Suke mine
