= COVID-19 pandemic in Kosovo =

- Disease: COVID-19
- Pathogen: SARS-CoV-2
- Location: Kosovo
- First outbreak: Wuhan, Hubei, China via Italy
- Index case: Vitia
- Arrival date: 13 March 2020 (6 years, 8 months and 1 day)
- Confirmed cases: 129,309
- Active cases: 19,695
- Hospitalized cases: 858
- Ventilator cases: 3
- Recovered: 107,288
- Deaths: 3014
- Fatality rate: 1.8%

The COVID-19 pandemic in Kosovo was a part of the worldwide pandemic of coronavirus disease 2019 (COVID-19) caused by severe acute respiratory syndrome coronavirus 2 (SARS-CoV-2). The virus' arrival was confirmed on 13 March 2020, with the first case being an Italian woman in her 20s who was working in the Caritas Kosova at Klina.

As of 14 January 2023, 1,836,901 COVID-19 vaccine doses have been administered in Kosovo.

== Background ==
On 12 January 2020, the World Health Organization (WHO) confirmed that a novel coronavirus was the cause of a respiratory illness in a cluster of people in Wuhan City, Hubei Province, China, who had initially come to the attention of the WHO on 31 December 2019.

Unlike SARS of 2003, the case fatality ratio for COVID-19 has been much lower, but the transmission has been significantly greater, with a significant total death toll.

== Timeline ==
=== 13–20 March 2020 ===
On 13 March, the first two cases were confirmed, a 77-year-old man from Vitina and an Italian woman in her early 20s, who worked in Klina with Caritas Kosova. The Government of Kosovo decided to quarantine and block the entrances and exits of these two cities.

On 14 March, the third case was confirmed, a family member of the 77-year-old from Vitina tested positive for coronavirus. On the same day, two other new cases were confirmed, a 42-year-old man from Vitia and a 37-year-old woman from Malisheva. After the first case emerged in Malisheva, the Prime Minister Albin Kurti decided to quarantine the municipality.

On 15 March, four new cases of coronavirus are confirmed, three from Malisheva and one from the village Dumnica of Podujevë. After the new cases emerged, the Ministry of Health requested that the Government of Kosovo declare a state of public health emergency.

On 16 March, four close family members of the 77-year-old patient from Vitina had been tested positive for coronavirus. Two additional cases of coronavirus were confirmed that day, a couple who flew from London to Pristina; a male and a female, both 26-years-old from Prizren and Obilić respectively.

On 17 March, a new case was confirmed. A 39-year-old woman from Kosovo's capital, Pristina, who had come from London to Pristina one day prior was tested positive for coronavirus. Another three new cases of coronavirus were confirmed that same day, when a family member of an infected person from village Dumnica of Podujevë and a man together with his wife who flew from Düsseldorf were tested positive for coronavirus.

On 18 March, a new case was confirmed. A 55-year-old woman from Podujevë tested positive for coronavirus. The evening of that day marked the first coronavirus case free evening since 13 March.

On the night of 19 March, a new case was confirmed. A 46-year-old man from the village Janjevo of Lipljan, who had previously flown from Berlin to Pristina eight days prior tested positive for coronavirus.

=== 20–31 March 2020 ===
On 20 March, a new case was confirmed. A 67-year-old man from the village Llashkadrenoc of Malisheva tested positive for coronavirus. Two additional cases of coronavirus were confirmed on the night of that date. A 53-year-old woman from Suva Reka and a 43-year-old man from Gjakova tested positive for coronavirus, both contacts of previously confirmed cases and the number of positive cases rose to 24.

On 21 March, four new cases of coronavirus were confirmed. A 32-year-old man from the village Bibaj of Ferizaj, who had come from Germany tested positive for coronavirus, while three other cases are contact cases; three women aged 29 and 50 from Pristina and one aged 40 from Gjakova. Another two new cases of coronavirus were confirmed on the night of same day, a 20-year-old man and a 36-year-old woman from Gjilan had been tested positive for coronavirus.

In the early hours of 22 March, a new case was confirmed. A 31-year-old man from the village Senik of Malisheva tested positive for coronavirus. On the same day the first death from coronavirus was confirmed. An 82-year-old man from village Dumnica of Podujevë is the first death from the pandemic, he had contracted the virus through contact with his son and daughter. Prior to the infection, he had had cardiac and chronic lung disease and on the sixth day of the infection he had signs of pulmonary infiltration and massive pneumonia on the left side. Another two new cases of coronavirus were confirmed that same day, a 50-year-old woman from the village Vrapçiç of Gjilan and a 53-year-old man from the village Domanek of Malisheva tested positive for coronavirus.

On 23 March, two new cases of coronavirus were confirmed, a 44-year-old man from village Petrovo of Shtime, marking the first case for this municipality and a 39-year-old woman from Kosovo's capital, Pristina was tested positive with coronavirus. Meanwhile, in the evening unfortunately even 26 cases were confirmed, 14 cases from Malisheva, 11 close members of the same family from village Vrapčič of Gjilan, 10 members of the same family got infected from another member who flew from Germany and one case from municipality of Gjakova and the number of positive cases rose to 61.

On 24 March, the decision taken one day before from Government of Kosovo for stopping the movement of people and vehicles for the following days came into force, the decision provides stopping the movement, except emergency cases from 10:00–16:00 and 20:00–06:00. While in the evening, two new cases of coronavirus were confirmed, a 25-year-old woman from the village Vrapčič of Gjilan and a 73-year-old woman from village Studime e Ulët of Vushtrri, who had come days before from Norway, marking the first case for this municipality was tested positive with coronavirus.

On 25 March, eight new cases of coronavirus were confirmed, four cases were confirmed from the village Domanek of Malisheva, three cases from Kosovo's capital, Pristina and one case from village Studime e Ulët of Vushtrri. All cases was as a result of contact with people that tested positive days before on these villages and municipalities and the number of infected people rose to 71.

On 26 March is marked the first recovery case, the son of the first death of coronavirus resulted negative in the second test. A few minutes later, four cases were confirmed from the village Studime e Ulët of Vushtrri, three cases from Kosovo's capital, Pristina and one case from village Llugaxhi of Peja was tested positive with coronavirus, but the night of same day comes to an end with seven new cases from Malisheva was tested positive with coronavirus and the number of infected people rose to 86.

On 27 March, two new cases of coronavirus are confirmed in the evening, one from Gjakova and the other from Kosovo's capital, Pristina and the number of positive cases rose to 88.

On 28 March, two new cases of coronavirus are confirmed, one from Podujevë and the other from Kosovo's capital, Pristina. Another one new case of coronavirus were confirmed that same day again in Pristina, and all cases was contact cases.

On 29 March, two new cases of coronavirus are confirmed, two from Kosovo's capital, Pristina and one from the village Kijevo of Malisheva and the number of positive cases rose to 94.

On 30 March, 12 new cases of coronavirus are confirmed, five from Malisheva, three from Kosovo Polje, two from Kosovo's capital, Pristina, one from Mitrovica (later confirmed as case from North Mitrovica) and one from Kamenica and the number of positive cases rose to 106.

On 31 March, two new cases of coronavirus are confirmed, one as a case of contact of two positive relatives with coronavirus from Gjakova and one from Prizren, who was infected during a visit abroad. On that day confirmed that five cases with coronavirus have been cured and four other cases have been infected, infected are two from North Mitrovica, one from Vushtrri and one from Malisheva.

=== 1–15 April 2020 ===
On 1 April, four cases with coronavirus have been cured and 13 other cases have been infected, infected are 11 from the village Topanicë of Kamenica, one from Kosovo's capital, Pristina and one from Gjakova.

On 2 April, a new case was confirmed. A woman from the village Koriša of Prizren tested positive for coronavirus. The Ministry of Health decided to quarantine and block the entrances in the village.

On 3 April, six cases with coronavirus have been cured, and six other cases have been infected, infected are four case from village Llugaxhi of Peja, one from Peja and one quarantined in the quarantine created in the Student Center in Pristina.

On 4 April, two new cases of coronavirus are confirmed in North Mitrovica. On that day confirmed that seven cases with coronavirus have been cured and five other cases have been infected, infected are two from village Banja of Malisheva, one from Kosovo's capital, Pristina, one from village Smrekonicë of Vushtrri and one quarantined in the quarantine created in the Student Center in Pristina.

On 5 April, five new cases of coronavirus are confirmed, three from village Banja of Malisheva, one from Gjakova and one from village Smrekonicë of Vushtrri and all cases was contact cases, increasing the number of positive issues to 145.

On 6 April, two new deaths from coronavirus are confirmed, one from Kosovo's capital, Pristina and one from village Koriša of Prizren. On the same day, 20 other new cases of coronavirus were confirmed, 15 from village Banja of Malisheva, two from Malisheva, one from Bllacë of Suva Reka, one from Glogovac and one from Kosovo's capital, Pristina.

On 7 April, five new cases are confirmed, five correctional officers and a health worker at the Detention Center in North Mitrovica were tested positive for coronavirus. A few minutes later, a 65-year-old man from Ferizaj died of cardiac arrest, but also was tested positive with coronavirus. Another three new cases of coronavirus were confirmed that same day, one in critical condition from Ferizaj, one from Malisheva, one from Kosovo's capital, Pristina, one from Gjilan and one laboratory technician from Gjakova. A few hours later, six cases with coronavirus have been cured and 19 other cases have been infected, infected are eight from village Smrekonicë of Vushtrri, four from Malisheva, three from Kosovo's capital, Pristina, one from Gjakova, one from Gjilan, one from village Sazli of Ferizaj and one from village Ujmirë of Klina.

On the night of 8 April, National Institute of Public Health announced that during this date are confirmed 14 new cases, four from village Smrekonicë of Vushtrri, two from village Banja of Malisheva, two from Kosovo's capital, Pristina, two from North Mitrovica and with one case in village Bllacë of Suva Reka, village Gjurgjevik of Klina, village Krojmir of Lipljan and Zvečan, seven cured cases and one deaths cases from village Banja of Malisheva.

On 9 April, one case with coronavirus from Vrapçiç of Gjilan have been dead. On that day confirmed that one case have been cured and three contact cases have been infected, infected are one from Suva Reka, one from village Hajvalia of Pristina and one from village Lešak of Leposavić.

On 10 April, 23 new cases were confirmed bringing the total to 250. 14 new recoveries were confirmed bringing the total to 52.

On 11 April, 33 new positive cases were confirmed bringing the total to 283. Six new recoveries were confirmed bringing the total to 58.

On 12 April, 79 new positive cases were confirmed bringing the total to 362. One new recovery was confirmed bringing the total to 59.

On 13 April, one new death was confirmed, bringing the total to 8. 15 new positive cases were confirmed, bringing the total to 377. Four recoveries were confirmed bringing the total to 63.

On 14 April, three cases with coronavirus have been cured and 10 other cases have been infected.

On 15 April, one new death case with coronavirus from Suva Reka was confirmed, bringing the total to 9. 36 new positive cases were confirmed, bringing the total to 423. Five recoveries were confirmed bringing the total to 71.

=== 16–30 April 2020 ===
On 16 April, two new deaths from coronavirus were confirmed, one from Peja and one from Vushtrri. 26 new positive cases were confirmed, bringing the total to 449. Eight recoveries were confirmed bringing the total to 79.

On 17 April, one new death case with coronavirus from Ferizaj was confirmed, bringing the total to 12. 31 new positive cases were confirmed, bringing the total to 480. Five recoveries were confirmed bringing the total to 84. Serbia announced that it had donated 1,000 coronavirus testing kits to Kosovo.

On 18 April, 30 new positive cases were confirmed, bringing the total to 510. Nine recoveries were confirmed bringing the total to 93.

On 19 April, 51 new positive cases were confirmed, bringing the total to 561. Nine recoveries were confirmed bringing the total to 102.

On 30 April, 11 new recovery cases were confirmed, bringing the total to 260. All of them are from Ferizaj

On 20 April, three new death cases were confirmed, two from North Mitrovica and one from Leposavić, all part of the Serbian community in Kosovo, bringing the total to 15. 37 new positive cases were confirmed, bringing the total to 598. 21 recoveries were confirmed bringing the total to 123.

On 21 April, three new death cases were confirmed, one from Gjakova, one from Leposavić and one from Zvečan, bringing the total to 18. 6 new positive cases were confirmed, bringing the total to 604. 5 recoveries were confirmed bringing the total to 128.

On 22 April, 26 new positive cases were confirmed, bringing the total to 630. Ten recoveries were confirmed, bringing the total to 138.

On 23 April, one new death case with coronavirus from Prizren was confirmed, bringing the total to 19. 39 new positive cases were confirmed, bringing the total to 669. 21 recoveries were confirmed, bringing the total to 159.

On 24 April, 34 new positive cases were confirmed, bringing the total to 703. 3 recoveries were confirmed, bringing the total to 162.

On 25 April, one new death case with coronavirus from Shtime was confirmed, bringing the total to 20. 28 new positive cases were confirmed, bringing the total to 731. Three recoveries were confirmed, bringing the total to 165.

On 26 April, one new death case with coronavirus from Gjilan was confirmed, bringing the total to 21. Thirty-two new positive cases were confirmed, bringing the total to 763. One new recovery was confirmed bringing the total to 166.

On 27 April, one new death case with coronavirus from Peja was confirmed, bringing the total to 22. 17 new positive cases were confirmed, bringing the total to 780. 35 recoveries were confirmed, bringing the total to 201.

On 28 April, 10 new positive cases were confirmed, bringing the total to 790. 31 recoveries were confirmed, bringing the total to 232.

On 29 April, 9 new positive cases were confirmed, bringing the total to 799. 17 recoveries were confirmed, bringing the total to 249.

On 30 April, 7 new positive cases were confirmed, bringing the total to 806. 22 recoveries were confirmed, bringing the total to 271.

=== 1–15 May 2020 ===
On 1 May, 7 new positive cases were confirmed, bringing the total to 813. 27 recoveries were confirmed, bringing the total to 298.

On 2 May, 10 new positive cases were confirmed, bringing the total to 823. 38 recoveries were confirmed, bringing the total to 336.

On 3 May, 11 new positive cases were confirmed, bringing the total to 851. 18 recoveries were confirmed, bringing the total to 381.

On 4 May, 4 new positive cases were confirmed, bringing the total to 855. 22 recoveries were confirmed, bringing the total to 403.

On 5 May, 1 new positive case was confirmed, bringing the total to 856. 87 recoveries were confirmed, bringing the total to 490.

On 6 May, 4 new positive cases were confirmed, bringing the total to 860. 43 recoveries were confirmed, bringing the total to 533.

On 7 May, one new death case with coronavirus from Dragash was confirmed, bringing the total to 27. 1 new positive case was confirmed, bringing the total to 861. 28 recoveries were confirmed, bringing the total to 561.

On 8 May, one new death case with coronavirus from Rahovec was confirmed, bringing the total to 28. 1 new positive case was confirmed, bringing the total to 862. 61 recoveries were confirmed, bringing the total to 622.

On 9 May, 8 new positive cases were confirmed, bringing the total to 870. 31 recoveries were confirmed, bringing the total to 653.

On 10 May, 14 new positive cases were confirmed, bringing the total to 884. 2 recoveries were confirmed, bringing the total to 655.

On 11 May, 11 new positive cases were confirmed, bringing the total to 895. 2 recoveries were confirmed, bringing the total to 657.

On 12 May, one new death cases with coronavirus from Rahovec was confirmed, bringing the total to 29. 24 new positive case were confirmed, bringing the total to 919. 14 recoveries were confirmed, bringing the total to 671.

On 13 May, 8 new positive cases were confirmed, bringing the total to 927.

On 14 May, 18 new positive cases were confirmed, bringing the total to 945. 19 recoveries were confirmed, bringing the total to 690.

On 15 May, 10 new positive cases were confirmed, bringing the total to 955. 1 recovery were confirmed, bringing the total to 691.

=== 16–31 May 2020 ===
On 16 May, 23 new positive cases were confirmed, bringing the total to 978. 22 recoveries were confirmed, bringing the total to 713.

On 17 May, 7 new positive cases were confirmed, bringing the total to 985. 23 recoveries were confirmed, bringing the total to 736.

On 18 May, 3 new positive cases were confirmed, bringing the total to 988. 18 recoveries were confirmed, bringing the total to 754.

On 19 May, 1 new positive case was confirmed, bringing the total to 989. 15 recoveries were confirmed, bringing the total to 769.

On 20 May, 14 new positive cases were confirmed, bringing the total to 1003. 3 recoveries were confirmed, bringing the total to 772.

On 21 May, 1 new positive case was confirmed, bringing the total to 1004.

On 22 May, 21 new positive cases were confirmed, bringing the total to 1025. 10 recoveries were confirmed, bringing the total to 782.

On 23 May, 7 new positive cases were confirmed, bringing the total to 1032. 3 recoveries were confirmed, bringing the total to 785.

On 24 May, for the first time since 13 March, no one has been reported infected with COVID-19. 4 recoveries were confirmed, bringing the total to 789.

On 25 May, one new death case with coronavirus from Prizren was confirmed, bringing the total to 30. 6 new positive cases was confirmed, bringing the total to 1,038. 4 recoveries were confirmed, bringing the total to 793.

On 26 May, Istok got declared as COVID-19 free. 9 new positive cases were confirmed, bringing the total to 1047. 3 recoveries were confirmed, bringing the total to 796.

On 27 May, one case was confirmed, bringing to total to 1,048. 7 recoveries were confirmed, bringing the total to 803.

On 28 May, 4 new positive cases were confirmed, bringing the total to 1,052. 19 recoveries were confirmed, bringing the total to 822.

On 29 May, 12 new positive cases were confirmed, bringing the total to 1,064. 9 recoveries were confirmed, bringing the total to 831.

On 30 May, 6 new positive cases were confirmed, bringing the total to 1,070. 12 recoveries were confirmed, bringing the total to 843.

On 31 May, 13 new positive cases were confirmed, bringing the total to 1,083. 2 recoveries were confirmed, bringing the total to 845.

=== 1–15 June 2020 ===
On 1 June, 27 new positive cases were confirmed, bringing the total to 1,110.

On 2 June, 13 new positive cases were confirmed, bringing the total to 1,123. 4 recoveries were confirmed, bringing the total to 847.

On 3 June, 19 new positive cases were confirmed, bringing the total to 1,142. 24 recoveries were confirmed, bringing the total to 871.

On 4 June, 5 new positive cases were confirmed, bringing the total to 1,147. 3 recoveries were confirmed, bringing the total to 874.

On 5 June, 11 new positive cases were confirmed, bringing the total to 1,158. 2 recoveries were confirmed, bringing the total to 876.

On 6 June, one new death case with coronavirus from Vushtrri was confirmed, bringing the total to 31. 36 new positive cases was confirmed, bringing the total to 1,194. 8 recoveries were confirmed, bringing the total to 884.

On 7 June, 40 new positive cases were confirmed, bringing the total to 1,234. 6 recoveries were confirmed, bringing the total to 890.

On 8 June, 29 new positive cases were confirmed, bringing the total to 1,263. 22 recoveries were confirmed, bringing the total to 912.

On 9 June, 6 new positive cases were confirmed, bringing the total to 1,269.

On 10 June, 29 new positive cases were confirmed bringing the total to 1,298. One new recovery was confirmed bringing the total to 913.

On 11 June, 28 new positive cases were confirmed bringing the total to 1,326. 8 recoveries were confirmed, bringing the total to 921.

On 12 June, 58 new positive cases were confirmed bringing the total to 1,384.

On 13 June, one new death case with coronavirus from Prizren was confirmed, bringing the total to 32. 53 new positive cases were confirmed bringing the total to 1,437. 7 recoveries were confirmed, bringing the total to 928.

On 14 June, one new death case with coronavirus from Prizren was confirmed, bringing the total to 33. 49 new positive cases were confirmed bringing the total to 1,486. 25 recoveries were confirmed, bringing the total to 953.

On 15 June, for the first time since 13 March, this is the largest number of people infected with COVID-19. 129 new positive cases were confirmed bringing the total to 1,615. 10 recoveries were confirmed, bringing the total to 963.

=== 16–30 June ===
On 16 June, one new death case with coronavirus from Rahovec was confirmed, bringing the total to 34. Another record increase in the number of COVID-19 infected people has been confirmed today. 141 new positive cases were confirmed, bringing the total to 1,756. 5 recoveries were confirmed, bringing the total to 968.

On 17 June, 77 new positive cases were confirmed, bringing the total to 1,833.

On 18 June, 83 new positive cases were confirmed, bringing the total to 1,916. 5 recoveries were confirmed, bringing the total to 973.

On 19 June, 82 new positive cases were confirmed, bringing the total to 1,998. 7 recoveries were confirmed, bringing the total to 980.

On 20 June, one new death case with coronavirus from Pristina was confirmed, bringing the total to 35. 75 new positive cases were confirmed, bringing the total to 2,073. 38 recoveries were confirmed, bringing the total to 1018.

On 21 June, one new death case with coronavirus from Rahovec was confirmed, bringing the total to 36. 96 new positive cases were confirmed, bringing the total to 2,169. 29 recoveries were confirmed, bringing the total to 1047.

On 22 June, two new deaths from coronavirus were confirmed, one from Gjilan and one from Vushtrri. 47 new positive cases were confirmed, bringing the total to 2,216. 22 recoveries were confirmed, bringing the total to 1069.

On 23 June, one new death case with coronavirus from Vushtrri was confirmed, bringing the total to 39. 52 new positive cases were confirmed, bringing the total to 2,268. 39 recoveries were confirmed, bringing the total to 1171.

On 24 June, one new death case with coronavirus from Prizren was confirmed, bringing the total to 40. 95 new positive cases were confirmed, bringing the total to 2,363. 63 recoveries were confirmed, bringing the total to 1171.

On 25 June, two new deaths were confirmed by the coronavirus, one from Istok and one from Prizren. 69 new positive cases were confirmed, bringing the total to 2,432. 75 recoveries were confirmed, bringing the total to 1246.

On 26 June, two new death cases were confirmed, one from Prizren and one from Rahovec, bringing the total to 44. 62 new positive cases were confirmed, bringing the total to 2,494. 61 recoveries were confirmed, bringing the total to 1307.

On 27 June, four new death cases were confirmed, three from Prizren, one from Suva Reka, bringing the total to 48. 96 new positive cases were confirmed, bringing the total to 2,590. 87 recoveries were confirmed, bringing the total to 1394. Twelve recoveries and one new confirmed case in Istok were confirmed.

On 28 June, one new death case with coronavirus from Mamushë was confirmed, bringing the total to 49. 87 new positive cases were confirmed, bringing the total to 2,677. 31 recoveries were confirmed, bringing the total to 1425.

On 29 June, one new death case with coronavirus from Malisheva was confirmed, bringing the total to 50. 122 new positive cases were confirmed, bringing the total to 2,799. 81 recoveries were confirmed, bringing the total to 1506.

On 30 June, one new death case with coronavirus from Vitina was confirmed, bringing the total to 51. 79 new positive cases were confirmed, bringing the total to 2,878. 71 recoveries were confirmed, bringing the total to 1,577.

=== 1–15 July ===
On 1 July, three new death cases with coronavirus were confirmed, one from Gjilan, one from Pristina and one from Prizren, bringing the total to 54. 113 new positive cases were confirmed, bringing the total to 2,991. 67 recoveries were confirmed, bringing the total to 1,644.

On 2 July, one new death case with coronavirus was confirmed, one from Mitrovica, bringing the total to 55. 73 new positive cases were confirmed, bringing the total to 3,064. 63 recoveries were confirmed, bringing the total to 1,707.

On 3 July, three new death cases with coronavirus were confirmed, one from Vushtrri and two others unknown, bringing the total to 58. 114 new positive cases were confirmed, bringing the total to 3,178. 117 recoveries were confirmed, bringing the total to 1,824.

On 4 July, another black record was set today. Eight new death cases with coronavirus were confirmed, one from Kosovo Polje, one from Mitrovica, one from Peja, one from Pristina, one from Vitina, one from Vushtrri and two others unknown, bringing the total to 66. 178 new positive cases were confirmed, bringing the total to 3,356. 50 recoveries were confirmed, bringing the total to 1,874.

On 5 July, a record number of cases have been registered. Nine new death cases with coronavirus were confirmed, one from Mitrovica, one from Peja, one from Rahovec, one from Pristina, one from Drenas and four others unknown, bringing the total to 75. 152 new positive cases were confirmed, bringing the total to 3,508. 28 recoveries were confirmed, bringing the total to 1,902

On 6 July, a record number of infected people were recorded today. Four new death cases with coronavirus were confirmed, one from Gjakova, one from Kosovo Polje and one from Podujevë, and another one unknown, bringing the total to 79. 195 new positive cases were confirmed, bringing the total to 3,703. 44 recoveries were confirmed, bringing the total to 1,946.

On 7 July, three new death cases with coronavirus were confirmed. 183 new positive cases were confirmed, bringing the total to 3,886. 57 recoveries were confirmed, bringing the total to 2,003.

On 8 July, a record number of infected people were recorded today. Four new death cases with coronavirus were confirmed, bringing the total to 86. 214 new positive cases were confirmed, bringing the total to 4,100. 60 recoveries were confirmed, bringing the total to 2,063.

On 9 July, eight new death cases with coronavirus were confirmed, bringing the total to 94. 207 new positive cases were confirmed, bringing the total to 4,307. 32 recoveries were confirmed, bringing the total to 2,095.

On 10 July, three new death cases with coronavirus were confirmed, bringing the total to 97. 205 new positive cases were confirmed, bringing the total to 4,512. 61 recoveries were confirmed, bringing the total to 2,156.

On 11 July, four new death cases with coronavirus were confirmed, bringing the total to 101. 203 new positive cases were confirmed, bringing the total to 4,715. 71 recoveries were confirmed, bringing the total to 2,227.

On 12 July, a record number of infected people were recorded. One death was confirmed, bringing the total to 102. 216 new positive cases were also confirmed, bringing the total to 4,931. 40 recoveries were confirmed, bringing the total to 2,267.

On 13 July, six new death cases with coronavirus were confirmed, bringing the total to 108. 187 new positive cases were confirmed. 103 recoveries were confirmed, bringing the total to 2,370.

On 14 July, the National Institute of Public Health has issued a press release announcing: "Due to the passing of the reporting for the publication of the results from the daily reports in the evening hours to the daily reporting at 15:00, we ask for your understanding and patience until the publication of the test results from NIPHK, which will take place tomorrow at 15:00".

On 15 July, four new death cases with coronavirus were confirmed, bringing the total to 112. 119 new positive cases were confirmed, bringing the total to 5,237. 92 recoveries were confirmed, bringing the total to 2,462.

=== 16–31 July ===
On 16 July, six new death cases with coronavirus were confirmed, bringing the total to 118. 132 new positive cases were confirmed, bringing the total to 5,369. 83 recoveries were confirmed, bringing the total to 2,545.

On 17 July, six new death cases with coronavirus were confirmed, bringing the total to 124. 103 new positive cases were confirmed, bringing the total to 5,472. 95 recoveries were confirmed, bringing the total to 2,640.

On 18 July, six new death cases with coronavirus were confirmed, bringing the total to 130. 145 new positive cases were confirmed, bringing the total to 5,617. 171 recoveries were confirmed, bringing the total to 2,811.

On 19 July, five new death cases with coronavirus were confirmed, bringing the total to 135. 118 new positive cases were confirmed, bringing the total to 5,735. 157 recoveries were confirmed, bringing the total to 2,968.

On 20 July, four new death cases with coronavirus were confirmed, bringing the total to 139. 142 new positive cases were confirmed, bringing the total to 5,877. 101 recoveries were confirmed, bringing the total to 3,069.

On 21 July, five new death cases with coronavirus were confirmed, bringing the total to 144. 168 new positive cases were confirmed, bringing the total to 6,045. 157 recoveries were confirmed, bringing the total to 3,226.

On 22 July, a record number of infected people were recorded today. Six new death cases with coronavirus were confirmed, bringing the total to 150. 241 new positive cases were confirmed, bringing the total to 6,286. 143 recoveries were confirmed, bringing the total to 3,369.

On 23 July, eight new death cases with coronavirus were confirmed, bringing the total to 158. 181 new positive cases were confirmed, bringing the total to 6,467. 136 recoveries were confirmed, bringing the total to 3,505.

On 24 July, six new death cases with coronavirus were confirmed, bringing the total to 164. 213 new positive cases were confirmed, bringing the total to 6,680. 109 recoveries were confirmed, bringing the total to 3,614.

On 25 July, five new death cases with coronavirus were confirmed, bringing the total to 169. 237 new positive cases were confirmed, bringing the total to 6,917. 139 recoveries were confirmed, bringing the total to 3,753.

On 26 July, eight new death cases with coronavirus were confirmed, bringing the total to 177. 220 new positive cases were confirmed, bringing the total to 7,137. 121 recoveries were confirmed, bringing the total to 3,874.

On 27 July, a record number of infected people were recorded today. Eight new death cases with coronavirus were confirmed, bringing the total to 185. 276 new positive cases were confirmed, bringing the total to 7,413. 153 recoveries were confirmed, bringing the total to 4,027.

On 28 July, seven new death cases with coronavirus were confirmed, bringing the total to 192. 239 new positive cases were confirmed, bringing the total to 7,652. 102 recoveries were confirmed, bringing the total to 4,129.

On 29 July, four new death cases with coronavirus were confirmed, bringing the total to 196. 194 new positive cases were confirmed, bringing the total to 7,846. 138 recoveries were confirmed, bringing the total to 4,267.

On 30 July, a record number of cases have been registered. Sixteen new death cases with coronavirus were confirmed, bringing the total to 212. 258 new positive cases were confirmed, bringing the total to 8,104. 196 recoveries were confirmed, bringing the total to 4,463.

On 31 July, fifteen new death cases with coronavirus were confirmed, bringing the total to 227. 226 new positive cases were confirmed, bringing the total to 8,330. 115 recoveries were confirmed, bringing the total to 4,578.

=== 1–15 August ===
On 1 August, nine new death cases with coronavirus were confirmed, bringing the total to 236. 224 new positive cases were confirmed, bringing the total to 8,554. 152 recoveries were confirmed, bringing the total to 4,730.

On 2 August, thirteen new death cases with coronavirus were confirmed, bringing the total to 249. 245 new positive cases were confirmed, bringing the total to 8,799. 133 recoveries were confirmed, bringing the total to 4,863. In the evening, Avdullah Hoti the Prime Minister of Kosovo announced that he was infected with COVID-19.

On 3 August, seven new death cases with coronavirus were confirmed, bringing the total to 256. 250 new positive cases were confirmed, bringing the total to 9,049. 126 recoveries were confirmed, bringing the total to 4,989.

On 4 August, thirteen new death cases with coronavirus were confirmed, bringing the total to 269. 225 new positive cases were confirmed, bringing the total to 9,274. 201 recoveries were confirmed, bringing the total to 5,190.

On 5 August, fifteen new death cases with coronavirus were confirmed, bringing the total to 284. 218 new positive cases were confirmed, bringing the total to 9,492. 156 recoveries were confirmed, bringing the total to 5,346.

On 6 August, sixteen new death cases with coronavirus were confirmed, bringing the total to 300. 196 new positive cases were confirmed, bringing the total to 9,688. 134 recoveries were confirmed, bringing the total to 5,480.

On 7 August, three new death cases with coronavirus were confirmed, bringing the total to 303. 181 new positive cases were confirmed, bringing the total to 9,869. 125 recoveries were confirmed, bringing the total to 5,605.

On 8 August, twelve new death cases with coronavirus were confirmed, bringing the total to 315. 190 new positive cases were confirmed, bringing the total to 10,059. 197 recoveries were confirmed, bringing the total to 5,802.

On 9 August, twelve new death cases with coronavirus were confirmed, bringing the total to 327. 188 new positive cases were confirmed, bringing the total to 10,247. 142 recoveries were confirmed, bringing the total to 5,944.

On 10 August, fourteen new death cases with coronavirus were confirmed, bringing the total to 341. 172 new positive cases were confirmed, bringing the total to 10,419. 114 recoveries were confirmed, bringing the total to 6,058.

On 11 August, thirteen new death cases with coronavirus were confirmed, bringing the total to 354. 171 new positive cases were confirmed, bringing the total to 10,590. 114 recoveries were confirmed, bringing the total to 6,248.

On 12 August, eleven new death cases with coronavirus were confirmed, bringing the total to 365. 205 new positive cases were confirmed, bringing the total to 10,795. 163 recoveries were confirmed, bringing the total to 6,411.

On 13 August, eight new death cases with coronavirus were confirmed, bringing the total to 373. 193 new positive cases were confirmed, bringing the total to 10,988. 205 recoveries were confirmed, bringing the total to 6,616.

On 14 August, eight new death cases with coronavirus were confirmed, bringing the total to 381. 142 new positive cases were confirmed, bringing the total to 11,130. 201 recoveries were confirmed, bringing the total to 6,817.

On 15 August, nine new death cases with coronavirus were confirmed, bringing the total to 390. 145 new positive cases were confirmed, bringing the total to 11,275. 144 recoveries were confirmed, bringing the total to 6,961.

=== 16–31 August ===
On 16 August, eleven new death cases with coronavirus were confirmed, bringing the total to 401. 141 new positive cases were confirmed, bringing the total to 11,416. 230 recoveries were confirmed, bringing the total to 7,191.

On 17 August, nine new death cases with coronavirus were confirmed, bringing the total to 410. 129 new positive cases were confirmed, bringing the total to 11,545. 152 recoveries were confirmed, bringing the total to 7,343.

On 18 August, six new death cases with coronavirus were confirmed, bringing the total to 416. 141 new positive cases were confirmed, bringing the total to 11,686. 219 recoveries were confirmed, bringing the total to 7,562.

On 19 August, nine new death cases with coronavirus were confirmed, bringing the total to 425. 162 new positive cases were confirmed, bringing the total to 11,848. 122 recoveries were confirmed, bringing the total to 7,684.

On 20 August, thirteen new death cases with coronavirus were confirmed, bringing the total to 438. 158 new positive cases were confirmed, bringing the total to 12,006. 245 recoveries were confirmed, bringing the total to 7,929.

On 21 August, ten new death cases with coronavirus were confirmed, bringing the total to 448. 162 new positive cases were confirmed, bringing the total to 12,168. 220 recoveries were confirmed, bringing the total to 8,149.

On 22 August, nine new death cases with coronavirus were confirmed, bringing the total to 457. 169 new positive cases were confirmed, bringing the total to 12,337. 197 recoveries were confirmed, bringing the total to 8,346.

On 23 August, ten new death cases with coronavirus were confirmed, bringing the total to 467. 111 new positive cases were confirmed, bringing the total to 12,448. 159 recoveries were confirmed, bringing the total to 8,505.

On 24 August, thirteen new death cases with coronavirus were confirmed, bringing the total to 480. 99 new positive cases were confirmed, bringing the total to 12,547. 152 recoveries were confirmed, bringing the total to 8,657.

On 25 August, eight new death cases with coronavirus were confirmed, bringing the total to 488. 136 new positive cases were confirmed, bringing the total to 12,683. 131 recoveries were confirmed, bringing the total to 8,788.

On 26 August, four new death cases with coronavirus were confirmed, bringing the total to 492. 157 new positive cases were confirmed, bringing the total to 12,840. 154 recoveries were confirmed, bringing the total to 8,942.

On 27 August, six new death cases with coronavirus were confirmed, bringing the total to 498. 141 new positive cases were confirmed, bringing the total to 12,981. 143 recoveries were confirmed, bringing the total to 9,085.

On 28 August, one new death case with coronavirus was confirmed, bringing the total to 499. 119 new positive cases were confirmed, bringing the total to 13,100. 154 recoveries were confirmed, bringing the total to 9,239.

On 29 August, nine new death cases with coronavirus were confirmed, bringing the total to 508. 115 new positive cases were confirmed, bringing the total to 13,215. 116 recoveries were confirmed, bringing the total to 9,345.

On 30 August, eight new death cases with coronavirus were confirmed, bringing the total to 516. 119 new positive cases were confirmed, bringing the total to 13,334. 118 recoveries were confirmed, bringing the total to 9,463.

On 31 August, nine new death cases with coronavirus were confirmed, bringing the total to 525. 120 new positive cases were confirmed, bringing the total to 13,454. 122 recoveries were confirmed, bringing the total to 9,585.

=== 1–30 September ===
On 1 September, eight new death cases with coronavirus were confirmed, bringing the total to 533. 147 new positive cases were confirmed, bringing the total to 13,601. 197 recoveries were confirmed, bringing the total to 9,792.

On 2 September, six new death cases with coronavirus were confirmed, bringing the total to 539. 112 new positive cases were confirmed, bringing the total to 13,713. 131 recoveries were confirmed, bringing the total to 9,923.

On 3 September, nine new death cases with coronavirus were confirmed, bringing the total to 548. 78 new positive cases were confirmed, bringing the total to 13,791. 190 recoveries were confirmed, bringing the total to 10,130.

On 4 September, three new death cases with coronavirus were confirmed, bringing the total to 551. 119 new positive cases were confirmed, bringing the total to 13,910. 187 recoveries were confirmed, bringing the total to 10,300.

On 5 September, five new death cases with coronavirus were confirmed, bringing the total to 556. 117 new positive cases were confirmed, bringing the total to 14,027. 131 recoveries were confirmed, bringing the total to 10,431.

On 6 September, seven new death cases with coronavirus were confirmed, bringing the total to 563. 92 new positive cases were confirmed, bringing the total to 14,119. 115 recoveries were confirmed, bringing the total to 10,546.

On 7 September, five new death cases with coronavirus were confirmed, bringing the total to 568. 85 new positive cases were confirmed, bringing the total to 14,204. 97 recoveries were confirmed, bringing the total to 10,643.

On 8 September, 97 new positive cases were confirmed, bringing the total to 14,301. 139 recoveries were confirmed, bringing the total to 10,782.

On 9 September, six new death cases with coronavirus were confirmed, bringing the total to 574. 76 new positive cases were confirmed, bringing the total to 14,377. 144 recoveries were confirmed, bringing the total to 10,926.

On 10 September, seven new death cases with coronavirus were confirmed, bringing the total to 581. 69 new positive cases were confirmed, bringing the total to 14,446. 107 recoveries were confirmed, bringing the total to 11,033.

On 11 September, five new death cases with coronavirus were confirmed, bringing the total to 586. 50 new positive cases were confirmed, bringing the total to 14,496. 117 recoveries were confirmed, bringing the total to 11,150.

On 12 September, three new death cases with coronavirus were confirmed, bringing the total to 589. 70 new positive cases were confirmed, bringing the total to 14,566. 122 recoveries were confirmed, bringing the total to 11,272.

On 13 September, seven new death cases with coronavirus were confirmed, bringing the total to 596. 71 new positive cases were confirmed, bringing the total to 14,637. 163 recoveries were confirmed, bringing the total to 11,435.

On 14 September, four new death cases with coronavirus were confirmed, bringing the total to 600. 55 new positive cases were confirmed, bringing the total to 14,692. 150 recoveries were confirmed, bringing the total to 11,585.

On 15 September, one new death case with coronavirus was confirmed, bringing the total to 601. 71 new positive cases were confirmed, bringing the total to 14,763. 199 recoveries were confirmed, bringing the total to 11,784.

On 16 September, three new death cases with coronavirus were confirmed, bringing the total to 604. 76 new positive cases were confirmed, bringing the total to 14,839. 165 recoveries were confirmed, bringing the total to 11,949.

On 17 September, three new death cases with coronavirus were confirmed, bringing the total to 607. 43 new positive cases were confirmed, bringing the total to 14,882. 239 recoveries were confirmed, bringing the total to 12,188.

On 18 September, four new death cases with coronavirus were confirmed, bringing the total to 611. 57 new positive cases were confirmed, bringing the total to 14,939. 137 recoveries were confirmed, bringing the total to 12,325.

On 19 September, 63 new positive cases were confirmed, bringing the total to 15,002. 126 recoveries were confirmed, bringing the total to 12,451.

On 20 September, two new death cases with coronavirus were confirmed, bringing the total to 613. 61 new positive cases were confirmed, bringing the total to 15,063. 119 recoveries were confirmed, bringing the total to 12,570.

On 21 September, two new death cases with coronavirus were confirmed, bringing the total to 615. 79 new positive cases were confirmed, bringing the total to 15,142. 104 recoveries were confirmed, bringing the total to 12,674.

On 22 September, 66 new positive cases were confirmed, bringing the total to 15,208. 141 recoveries were confirmed, bringing the total to 12,815.

On 23 September, one new death case with coronavirus was confirmed, bringing the total to 616. 62 new positive cases were confirmed, bringing the total to 15,270. 85 recoveries were confirmed, bringing the total to 12,900.

On 24 September, 63 new positive cases were confirmed, bringing the total to 15,333. 87 recoveries were confirmed, bringing the total to 12,987.

On 25 September, one new death case with coronavirus was confirmed, bringing the total to 617. 46 new positive cases were confirmed, bringing the total to 15,379. 101 recoveries were confirmed, bringing the total to 13,088.

On 26 September, two new death cases with coronavirus were confirmed, bringing the total to 619. 46 new positive cases were confirmed, bringing the total to 15,425. 77 recoveries were confirmed, bringing the total to 13,165.

On 27 September, three new death cases with coronavirus were confirmed, bringing the total to 622. 47 new positive cases were confirmed, bringing the total to 15,472. 113 recoveries were confirmed, bringing the total to 13,287.

On 28 September, three new death cases with coronavirus were confirmed, bringing the total to 625. 48 new positive cases were confirmed, bringing the total to 15,520. 142 recoveries were confirmed, bringing the total to 13,420.

=== 1–31 October ===
On 1 October, 42 new positive cases were confirmed, bringing the total to 15,705. 54 recoveries were confirmed, bringing the total to 13,731.

On 2 October, three new death cases with coronavirus were confirmed, bringing the total to 630. 53 new positive cases were confirmed, bringing the total to 15,758. 56 recoveries were confirmed, bringing the total to 13,787.

On 3 October, 56 new positive cases were confirmed, bringing the total to 15,814. 69 recoveries were confirmed, bringing the total to 13,856.

On 4 October, three new death cases with coronavirus were confirmed, bringing the total to 633. 41 new positive cases were confirmed, bringing the total to 15,855. 73 recoveries were confirmed, bringing the total to 13,929.

On 5 October, two new death cases with coronavirus were confirmed, bringing the total to 635. 34 new positive cases were confirmed, bringing the total to 15,889. 122 recoveries were confirmed, bringing the total to 14,051.

On 6 October, three new death cases with coronavirus were confirmed, bringing the total to 638. 49 new positive cases were confirmed, bringing the total to 15,938. 92 recoveries were confirmed, bringing the total to 14,143.

On 7 October, 33 new positive cases were confirmed, bringing the total to 15,971. 46 recoveries were confirmed, bringing the total to 14,189.

On 8 October, three new death cases with coronavirus were confirmed, bringing the total to 641. 79 new positive cases were confirmed, bringing the total to 16,050. 61 recoveries were confirmed, bringing the total to 14,250.

On 9 October, four new death cases with coronavirus were confirmed, bringing the total to 645. 80 new positive cases were confirmed, bringing the total to 16,130. 32 recoveries were confirmed, bringing the total to 14,282.

On 10 October, two new death cases with coronavirus were confirmed, bringing the total to 647. 49 new positive cases were confirmed, bringing the total to 16,179. 53 recoveries were confirmed, bringing the total to 14,335.

On 11 October, one new death case with coronavirus was confirmed, bringing the total to 648. 68 new positive cases were confirmed, bringing the total to 16,247. 33 recoveries were confirmed, bringing the total to 14,368.

On 12 October, one new death case with coronavirus was confirmed, bringing the total to 649. 98 new positive cases were confirmed, bringing the total to 16,345. 37 recoveries were confirmed, bringing the total to 14,405.

On 13 October, one new death case with coronavirus was confirmed, bringing the total to 650. 80 new positive cases were confirmed, bringing the total to 16,425. 55 recoveries were confirmed, bringing the total to 14,460.

On 14 October, 77 new positive cases were confirmed, bringing the total to 16,502. 59 recoveries were confirmed, bringing the total to 14,519.

On 15 October, two new death cases with coronavirus were confirmed, bringing the total to 652. 104 new positive cases were confirmed, bringing the total to 16,606. 42 recoveries were confirmed, bringing the total to 14,561.

On 16 October, 148 new positive cases were confirmed, bringing the total to 16,754. 56 recoveries were confirmed, bringing the total to 14,617.

On 17 October, one new death case with coronavirus was confirmed, bringing the total to 653. 137 new positive cases were confirmed, bringing the total to 16,891. 49 recoveries were confirmed, bringing the total to 14,666.

On 18 October, three new death cases with coronavirus were confirmed, bringing the total to 656. 118 new positive cases were confirmed, bringing the total to 17,009. 50 recoveries were confirmed, bringing the total to 14,716.

On 19 October, one new death case with coronavirus was confirmed, bringing the total to 657. 130 new positive cases were confirmed, bringing the total to 17,139. 71 recoveries were confirmed, bringing the total to 14,787.

On 20 October, 124 new positive cases were confirmed, bringing the total to 17,263. 49 recoveries were confirmed, bringing the total to 14,836.

On 21 October, 159 new positive cases were confirmed, bringing the total to 17,422. 58 recoveries were confirmed, bringing the total to 14,894.

On 22 October, two new death cases with coronavirus were confirmed, bringing the total to 659. 169 new positive cases were confirmed, bringing the total to 17,591. 85 recoveries were confirmed, bringing the total to 14,979.

On 23 October, two new death cases with coronavirus were confirmed, bringing the total to 661. 166 new positive cases were confirmed, bringing the total to 17,757. 55 recoveries were confirmed, bringing the total to 15,034.

On 24 October, two new death cases with coronavirus were confirmed, bringing the total to 663. 186 new positive cases were confirmed, bringing the total to 17,943. 54 recoveries were confirmed, bringing the total to 15,088.

On 25 October, three new death cases with coronavirus were confirmed, bringing the total to 666. 205 new positive cases were confirmed, bringing the total to 18,148. 62 recoveries were confirmed, bringing the total to 15,150.

On 26 October, three new death cases with coronavirus were confirmed, bringing the total to 669. 197 new positive cases were confirmed, bringing the total to 18,345. 48 recoveries were confirmed, bringing the total to 15,198.

On 27 October, four new death cases with coronavirus were confirmed, bringing the total to 673. 281 new positive cases were confirmed, bringing the total to 18,626. 97 recoveries were confirmed, bringing the total to 15,295.

On 28 October, one new death case with coronavirus was confirmed, bringing the total to 674. 284 new positive cases were confirmed, bringing the total to 18,910. 72 recoveries were confirmed, bringing the total to 15,367.

On 29 October, four new death cases with coronavirus were confirmed, bringing the total to 678. 418 new positive cases were confirmed, bringing the total to 19,328. 67 recoveries were confirmed, bringing the total to 15,434.

On 30 October, three new death cases with coronavirus were confirmed, bringing the total to 681. 514 new positive cases were confirmed, bringing the total to 19,842. 86 recoveries were confirmed, bringing the total to 15,520.

On 31 October, seven new death cases with coronavirus were confirmed, bringing the total to 688. 337 new positive cases were confirmed, bringing the total to 20,179. 91 recoveries were confirmed, bringing the total to 15,611.

== Impact on politics ==
On 18 March, the interior minister, Agim Veliu was sacked due to his support for declaring a state of emergency to handle the pandemic which would have given power to the Kosovo Security Council chaired by President of Kosovo, Hashim Thaçi. On the night of 25 March, the Kurti cabinet was overthrown by a no-confidence motion initiated in assembly by the ruling partner.

== Statistics ==
As of 26 December 2020, a total of 178,390 people have been tested in Kosovo for COVID-19.

The following depicts the growth of the coronavirus cases in Kosovo since 13 March 2020 to 26 December 2020.

=== Charts ===
==== Cumulative cases, recoveries and deaths ====
Total confirmed cases Total recovered cases Total deaths

View source data.

==== Number of new cases per day ====
View source data.

==== Total number of deaths ====
View source data.

==== Number of deaths per day ====
View source data.

==== Active cases per day ====
View source data.

==== Total number of recoveries ====
View source data.

==== Number of recoveries per day ====
View source data.

==== Hospitalized cases per day ====
Intubated ICU Hospital care

View source data.

==== Tests per day ====
View source data.

==== Daily test positivity ratio ====
View source data.

==== Number of daily tests and positive cases ====
Number tested per day Positive per day

View source data.

==== Number of cases by districts ====
View source data.

==== Number of deaths by districts ====
View source data.

==== Number of confirmed cases on a logarithmic scale ====
View source data.
Number of confirmed cases on a logarithmic scale

=== Infected per municipality ===
Infected per municipality

Municipality	Cases	Deaths	Recoveries	Active
Pristina	31,016	263	26,839	3,914
Gjilan	4,342	107	3,611	818
Prizren	3,763	199	2,967	397
Kosovo Polje	3,654	46	2,950	658
Peja	3,653	95	2,908	650
Mitrovica	3,556	85	2,933	538
Podujevë	3,489	54	2,4852	583
Ferizaj	3,479	104	3,075	300
Gjakova	3,390	117	2,753	520
Vushtrri	2,690	71	2,013	506
Lipjan	2,285	33	1,936	316
Drenas	1,423	48	1,256	109
Viti	1,347	51	1,137	159
Suva Reka	1,306	71	1,007	228
Obiliq	1,287	24	1,005	258
Kamenica	1,043	43	693	307
Skenderaj	1,008	29	866	113
Rahovec	914	61	613	240
Deçan	897	25	743	129
Malisheva	894	47	731	116
Klina	837	35	679	123
Shtime	659	21	575	63
Istog	645	30	528	87
Kaçanik	459	15	400	44
Dragash	354	33	258	63
Gračanica	174	1	126	47
Novo Brdo	111	1	73	37
Hani i Elezit	93	2	85	5
Junik	91	2	72	17
Mamusha	63	6	48	9
Zubin Potok	58	2	54	2
Klokot	57	0	48	9
North Mitrovica	49	3	45	1
Zvečan	34	1	32	1
Štrpce	31	2	25	4
Leposavić	26	4	21	1
Ranilug	8	0	7	1
Partesh	4	0	4	0
Total	79,089	1,731	65,979	11,379
As of 17 March 2021

== International aid ==
The countries and international organizations that have sent aid and funds to Government of Kosovo, to help fight the pandemic:

- Austria On 29 May, has donated 250,000 euros aimed at expanding the capacity and improving the capabilities of combating the COVID-19 pandemic.
- Czech Republic On 16 December, has donated 193,000 euros aimed at expanding the capacity and improving the capabilities of combating the COVID-19 pandemic
- European Union On 25 March, has donated 68 million euros aimed at expanding the capacity and improving the capabilities of combating the COVID-19 pandemic.
- Germany has donated 6,000 coronavirus tests.
- Hungary has donated protective equipment.
- Italy has donated protective equipment.
- Japan On 26 May, has donated 718,000 dollars aimed at expanding the capacity and improving the capabilities of combating the COVID-19 pandemic.
- Jordan On 2 July, has donated 24 tons of medical aid.
- Luxembourg has donated 5,000 coronavirus tests.
- Malaysia On 15 August, have donated 1 million masks and 30,000 gloves.
- Netherlands On 3 December, have donated 250,000 euros aimed at expanding the capacity and improving the capabilities of combating the COVID-19 pandemic.
- Norway On 6 April, have donated 450,000 euros aimed at expanding the capacity and improving the capabilities of combating the COVID-19 pandemic.
- Poland has donated 50,000 masks.
- Qatar has donated 6,500 coronavirus tests and respirators.
- Serbia Government of Serbia donated 1,000 coronavirus test kits to the Public Health Institute of Kosovo, as part of the region's co-operation with Kosovo in the fight against COVID-19.
- Switzerland On 3 April, has donated 500,000 Swiss francs aimed at expanding the capacity and improving the capabilities of combating the COVID-19 pandemic.
- Turkey has donated protective masks, protective suits, and 1,000 COVID-19 testing kits.
- (United Nations) UNDP has donated 3,000 coronavirus test kits.
- (United Nations) UNICEF has donated 1.5 tons of medical aid.
- United States On 27 March, has donated 1.1 million euros aimed at expanding the capacity and improving the capabilities of combating the COVID-19 pandemic.

=== Albanian donations ===
- Albanian diaspora have donated 12,000 coronavirus test kits.

=== International aid that Kosovo sent ===
- Serbia: On 29 April, Kosovo donated €500,000 to the municipalities of Preševo, Medveđa and Bujanovac.

== See also ==
- COVID-19 pandemic by country and territory
- COVID-19 pandemic in Europe
- COVID-19 pandemic in Albania
- COVID-19 pandemic in Serbia

== Notes and references ==
=== Notes ===
1. The cases in Malisheva are two in village Senik, one in village Llashkadrenoc and one in village Topanicë.
