= Bajrak of Oštrozub =

Bajrak of Oštrozub was a bajrak which included about 43 villages in southern and central Lapušnica and southern Drenica, today's Kosovo. Bajraks were military units and later administrative land divisions created in some provinces of historical Albania which also included what is today Kosovo during the Ottoman Empire. It was a patriarchal organization, similar to a commune or small district today.

The Bajrak of Oštrozub was one of the largest of Kosovo and Albania. It is believed that it formed as an administrative unit in the mountainous area of Lapušnica which was not controlled directly by the Ottoman government due to its location so it was given autonomy. The Bajrak of Oštrozub is believed to have been formed sometime in the mid-17th century based on Oštrozub which today is a village in the municipality of Mališevo.

The Bajrak of Oštrozub also was popularly known as Bajrak Kapakli in reference to the warfare conducted by fighters in the region against the Ottoman Empire during the Russo-Turkish war.

It included about 43 villages:

- Arllati
- Bajica
- Balinca
- Banja
- Bellanica
- Bllaca
- Breshanci
- Bubli
- Istok
- Carralluka
- Damaneku
- Doberdelani
- Dragobili
- Drenovac
- Duhla
- Dush
- Gajraku
- Gjurgjica
- Goriqi
- Gurbardhi
- Janqisti
- Javori
- Karraqica
- Kasterci
- Kervaseria
- Kijeva
- Kishnareka
- Kleqka
- Lladrovci
- Lladroviqi
- Llapushniku
- Llazica
- Lubizhda
- Luzhnica
- Mališevo
- Maxharra
- Mrasori
- Negrovci
- Ngucati
- Nishori
- Oštrozub
- Pagarusha
- Panorci
- Perqeva
- Petershtica
- Qypeva
- Semetishti
- Seniku
- Sferka
- Shkarashniku
- Shkoza
- Sllapuzhani
- Temeqina
- Terpeza
- Turjaka
- Vermica
- Volljaka
- Vuqaku
- Zatriqi
