= Kishnareka =

Kishnareka Kishnarekë
- Village
- Location within Kosovo
- Coordinates: 42.550925°N 20.886668°E
- Country: Kosovo
- District: Pristina
- Municipality: Drenas

Area
  - Total: 0.76 km^{2} (0.29 sq mi)

Population (2024)
  - Total: 1,194
- Time zone: UTC+1 (CET)
  - Summer (DST): UTC+2 (CEST)
- Postal Code: 13000
- Area code: +383

Kishnarekë (in Albanian) or Kishnareka is a village in the municipality of Drenas, in central Kosovo. It lies approximately 40 km from Pristina and some 10 km from the town of Drenas, close to Nekoc and Komorane. The population in 2024 was 1194.

After 1999, the village was also known by the names Lumisht and Krujas.
