= Illyrian TSX =

Illyrian TSX is a high-performance supercar developed by the Albanian automotive company Arrera Automobili, founded by a Kosovar-Albanian.

== Overview ==
The Illyrian TSX was designed to rival luxury supercar brands like Ferrari and Lamborghini. It was officially unveiled at the TREDITECH exhibition in Turin, Italy. Only 27 units of the car will be produced, with pricing between €1.2 million and €1.7 million.

== Variants ==
=== TSX S6 ===
- Engine: 3.0L twin-turbocharged V6
- Power Output: ~651 hp
- Torque: 800 Nm
- Transmission: 6-speed sequential gearbox
- Weight: 1,250 kg
- Downforce: Over 1,500 kg
- Top Speed: 375 km/h

=== TSX S9 ===
- Engine: 4.4L twin-turbocharged V8
- Power Output: ~937 hp
- Downforce: Up to 2,000 kg
- Top Speed: 375 km/h

== Design ==
The TSX features a carbon fiber monocoque chassis, forged center-lock wheels, and Brembo braking systems. Its interior includes racing-style seats, dual screens for the driver, a semi-yoke steering wheel, and a rear display for the passenger. The logo features a double-headed eagle inspired by the Albanian national flag.

== Development ==
Qëndrim Thaçi was born in Llapushnik, Drenas (Kosovo) and later moved to Italy. Initially studying dentistry, he shifted to industrial design, attending eAD in Italy. He worked on prototype projects for Ferrari and Lamborghini before founding Arrera Automobili in 2016.

== Performance ==
- 0–100 km/h (0–62 mph): ~2.7 seconds (S9)
- Top Speed: 375 km/h
- Power-to-weight ratio: Approx. 521 hp/ton (S6)

== Legal controversy ==
In June 2025, Albanian developer Enea Muja publicly accused Arrera Automobili and its founder Qëndrim Thaçi of contractual fraud. Muja published a notarized agreement allegedly signed by both parties, stating he was entitled to 1% ownership of the company and a €10,000 bonus for every car sold. However, Muja claims that his name was never registered in the Kosovo Business Registry (ARBK), and that the company failed to fulfill its contractual obligations.

The accusations were covered by Albanian media outlets, including *JOQ Albania* and *Insajderi*. In response, Arrera Automobili issued an official statement on social media, denying the allegations and declaring that Muja had been “legally and irrevocably removed” from the company following what they described as “defamatory” actions.

Legal proceedings may follow, as Muja has stated his intention to pursue justice through court.
