= Banjë, Malishevë =

Banjë: Banjë (Albanian); Бања/Banja (Serbian)
- Village
- Location in Kosovo
- Coordinates: 42.464385°N 20.779106°E
- Location: Kosovo
- District: Prizren
- Municipality: Malishevë

Population (2011)
  - Total: 3,639
- Time zone: UTC+1 (CET)
  - Summer (DST): UTC+2 (CEST)

Banja (Albanian: Banjë;Serbian: Бања) is a village in municipality of Malisheva in Republic of Kosovo. The village has an area of 1305 ha. The village is named after a local spring with warm water that has healing properties. The toponym comes from Proto-Slavic *baňa, an old borrowing from Vulgar Latin *bāneum, from Latin balneum. (lit. spa).

== History ==
It was first mentioned in 1348, in Holy Archangel charter of emperor Stephen Uroš IV Dušan of Serbia. Above the village there were two churches, which villagers called Kiša and Other Kiša. "Kisha" in the Albanian language literally translates to Church.

In April 2020, 20 residents of the town were in isolation due to the COVID-19 pandemic.

== Demography ==
Demographics
Year	Population
1948	942
1953	1036
1961	1252
1971	1707
1981	2349
1991	3099
Ref: Federal Office of Statistics and Evidence of Federal People's Republic of Yugoslavia and Socialist Federal Republic of Yugoslavia, census for 1948, 1953, 1961, 1971, 1981. and 1991.

== Notable people ==
- Fatmir Limaj
- Drilon Hazrollaj
