= Suke =

Suke (or sukë) may refer to:

- Sukë, a village in Albania
- A transliteration of 蘇科, a version of the name for Zuko in Avatar: The Last Airbender
- Sungai Besi–Ulu Klang Elevated Expressway, a highway in Malaysia
- Suke mine, a nickel mine in Kosovo
