= Nekoc =

Nekoc: Nekoc (Albanian); Нековце/Nekovce (Serbian)
- Village
- Location within Kosovo
- Coordinates: 42.535545°N 20.897256°E
- Location: Kosovo
- District: Prishtinë
- Municipality: Drenas
- Elevation: 620–700 m (2,030–2,300 ft)

Population (2024)
  - Total: 2,498
- Time zone: UTC+1 (Central European Time)
  - Summer (DST): UTC+2 (CEST)
- Postal code: 13000

Nekoc is a village in the District of Pristina, Kosovo. It is located west of Pristina, south of Komoranë.
