= Bajrak =

Territorial unit of the Ottoman Empire

The bajrak (Ottoman Turkish: بایراک, romanized: Bayrak; pronounced /beɪrɑːk, baɪ-/, meaning "banner" or "flag") was an Ottoman territorial unit, consisting of villages in mountainous frontier regions of the Balkans, from which military recruitment was based. It was introduced in the late 17th century and continued its use until the end of Ottoman rule in Rumelia. The bajrak included one or more clans. It was especially implemented in northern Albania and in parts of Kosovo (Sanjak of Prizren and Sanjak of Scutari), where in the 19th century these regions constituted the frontier with the Principality of Serbia and Principality of Montenegro. These sanjaks had notable communities of Gheg Albanians (Muslims and Catholics), Serbs and Slavic Muslims. The Albanians adopted the system into their clan structure, and bajraks endured during the Kingdom of Serbia (1882–1918) and People's Socialist Republic of Albania (1944–1992).

== Overview ==
The bajrak was a territorial unit of the Ottoman Empire, consisting of a group of villages, from which military recruitment was organized – a "territorialized military organization." The bajrak was composed of one or more clans. Several smaller clans could inhabit a single bajrak while larger clans occupied several bajrak; usually a bajraktar ("standard-bearer") led a clan, while in some cases a bajraktar led several clans or a single clan had several bajraktars. The Ottomans entrusted the bajraktar with providing soldiers from his bajrak in exchange for privileges, and sometimes he performed important administrative and judicial duties. The bajraktar was usually hereditary position, via paternal ancestry appointed by the Ottoman government. Bajraks formed loose tribal confederations; for example, the Shala joined the Shoshi.

The bajrak system existed in many mountainous ethnographic regions, such as Lumë.

== Aftermath ==
=== In Albania ===
According to Enke (1955), the Dukagjin highlands was inhabited by the "six bajraks, Shala, Shoshi, Kir, Gjaj, Plan, and Toplan," while according to Prothero (1973), it then included "Pulati, Shala and Shoshi, Dushmani, Toplana, Nikaj, and Merturi."

=== In Serbia and Yugoslavia ===
In Kosovo, after the conquest by Kingdom of Serbia, the Albanians incorporated the bajrak into their clan system (known as fis). The Yugoslav authorities tried to break up the feudal relations created through this system.

== See also ==
- Nahiyah
- Bajrak of Oštrozub
- Bajrakli Mosque (disambiguation)
- Albanian mafia
