= Bellanicë =

Bellanicë: Bellanicë (Albanian); Беланица/Belanica (Serbian)
- Village
- Location within Kosovo
- Coordinates: 42.457454°N 20.814092°E
- Location: Kosovo
- District: Prizren
- Municipality: Malishevë
- Elevation: 594 m (1,949 ft)

Population (2024)
  - Total: 1,736
- Time zone: UTC+1 (CET)
  - Summer (DST): UTC+2 (CEST)

Bellanicë (Albanian: Bellanicë, Serbian Cyrillic: Беланица/Belanica) is a village in Malishevë municipality, Kosovo.
