= Carrallukë =

Carrallukë: Carrallukë (Albanian); Црни Луг/Crni Lug (Serbian)
- Village
- Location within Kosovo
- Coordinates: 42.518225°N 20.785695°E
- Location: Kosovo
- District: Prizren
- Municipality: Malishevë
- Elevation: 565 m (1,854 ft)

Population (2024)
  - Total: 1,859
- Time zone: UTC+1 (CET)
  - Summer (DST): UTC+2 (CEST)

Carrallukë (Albanian: Carrallukë, Serbian Cyrillic: Црни Луг/Crni Lug) is a village in Malishevë municipality, Kosovo.
