= Astrazup =

Astrazup: Astrazup (Albanian); Острозуб/Ostrozub (Serbian)
- Village
- Location within Kosovo
- Coordinates: 42.447797°N 20.698146°E
- Location: Kosovo
- District: Prizren
- Municipality: Malishevë
- Elevation: 605 m (1,985 ft)

Population (2024)
  - Total: 1,376
- Time zone: UTC+1 (CET)
  - Summer (DST): UTC+2 (CEST)

Astrazup (Albanian: Astrazup, Serbian Cyrillic: Острозуб/Ostrozub) is a village in Malishevë, Kosovo.
