= Vasileva Lake =

Lake in Kosovo

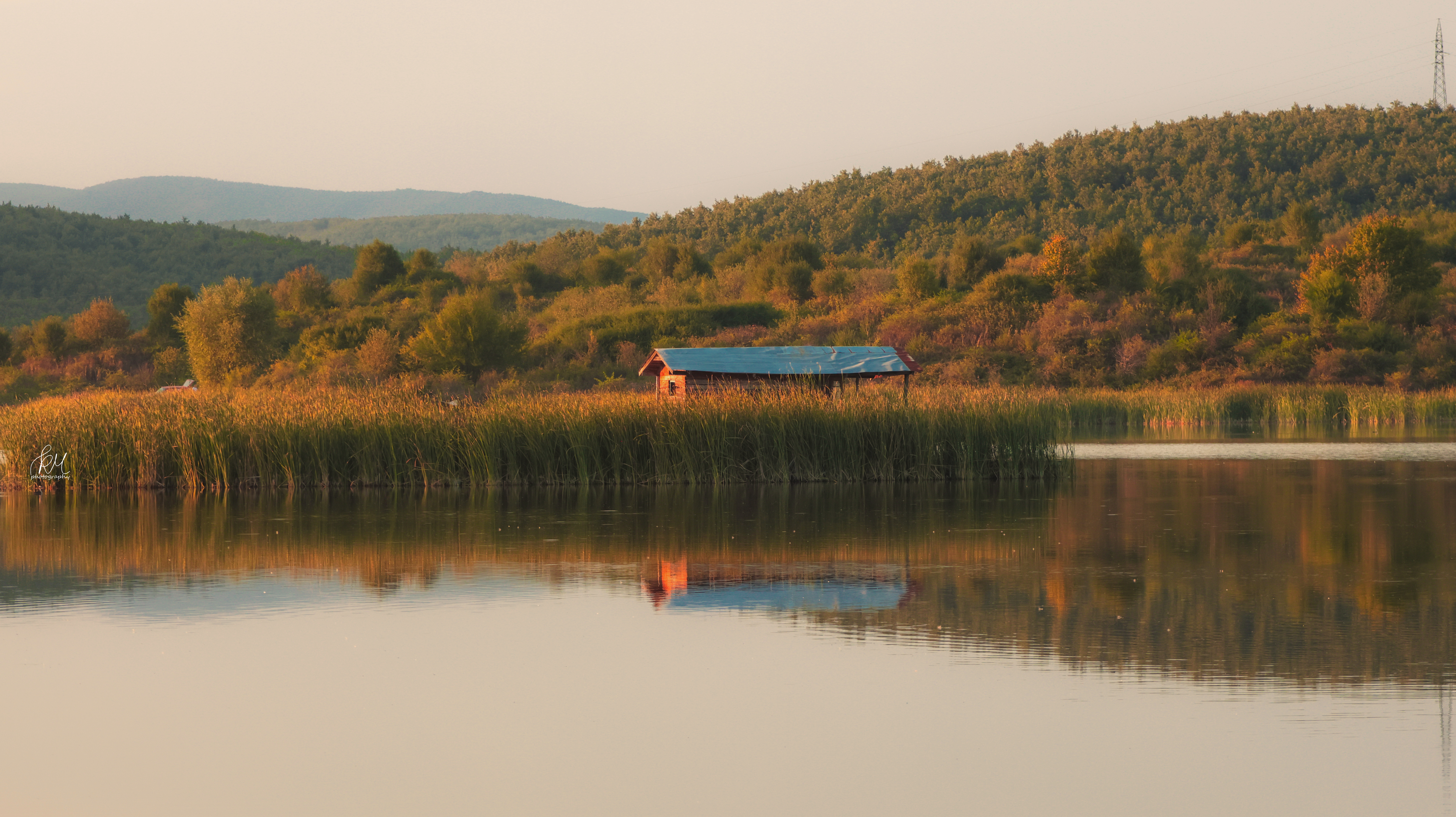

- Location within Kosovo Location within Europe
- Interactive map of Vasileva Lake
- Location: Drenas
- Coordinates: 42°37′47″N 20°58′26″E
- Basin countries: Kosovo
- Max. length: 1 kilometre (0.62 mi)
- Max. width: 200 metres (660 ft)
- Surface area: 0.2 square kilometres (0.077 sq mi)
- Max. depth: 20 metres (66 ft)
- Settlements: Vasileva

Vasileva Lake (Albanian: Liqeni i Vasilevës) is a small lake between the municipalities of Drenas and Fushë Kosovë. The lake has an area of about 0.2 km^{2} (0.077 sq mi) and it has a depth of about around 20 meters.

The lake is also rich in flora and fauna and is very suitable for fishing. In this lake there are at least 5 species of wild geese, dozens of species of birds and several species of fish. The grey heron was also spotted on the lake. Over time, a small island has been created in the lake, which is used by fishermen.

Vasileva Lake was formed by mining activities and excavation of minerals in the area.

== See also ==
- List of lakes of Kosovo
