= Llashkadrenoc =

Llashkadrenoc: Llashkadrenoc (Albanian); Влашки Дреновац/Vlaški Drenovac (Serbian)
- Village
- Location within Kosovo
- Coordinates: 42.539567°N 20.717885°E
- Location: Kosovo
- District: Prizren
- Municipality: Mališevo
- Elevation: 589 m (1,932 ft)

Population (2024)
  - Total: 2,776
- Time zone: UTC+1 (CET)
  - Summer (DST): UTC+2 (CEST)

Llashkadrenoc (Albanian: Llashkadrenoc, Serbian Cyrillic: Влашки Дреновац/Vlaški Drenovac) is a village in Malishevë municipality, Kosovo.
