= Dritan (village) =

Village in Drenas, Kosovo

- Village
- Location within Kosovo
- Coordinates: 42°39′33″N 20°57′04″E
- Country: Kosovo
- District: Prishtinë
- Municipality: Drenas

Population (2024)
  - Total: 1,125
- Time zone: UTC+1 (CET)
  - Summer (DST): UTC+2 (CEST)

Dritan (Albanian definite form: Dritani) is a settlement in the municipality of Drenas, Kosovo. Before 1999, the village was also known as Dobroshec.

The village is known for a rock formation named, Guri i Plakës.

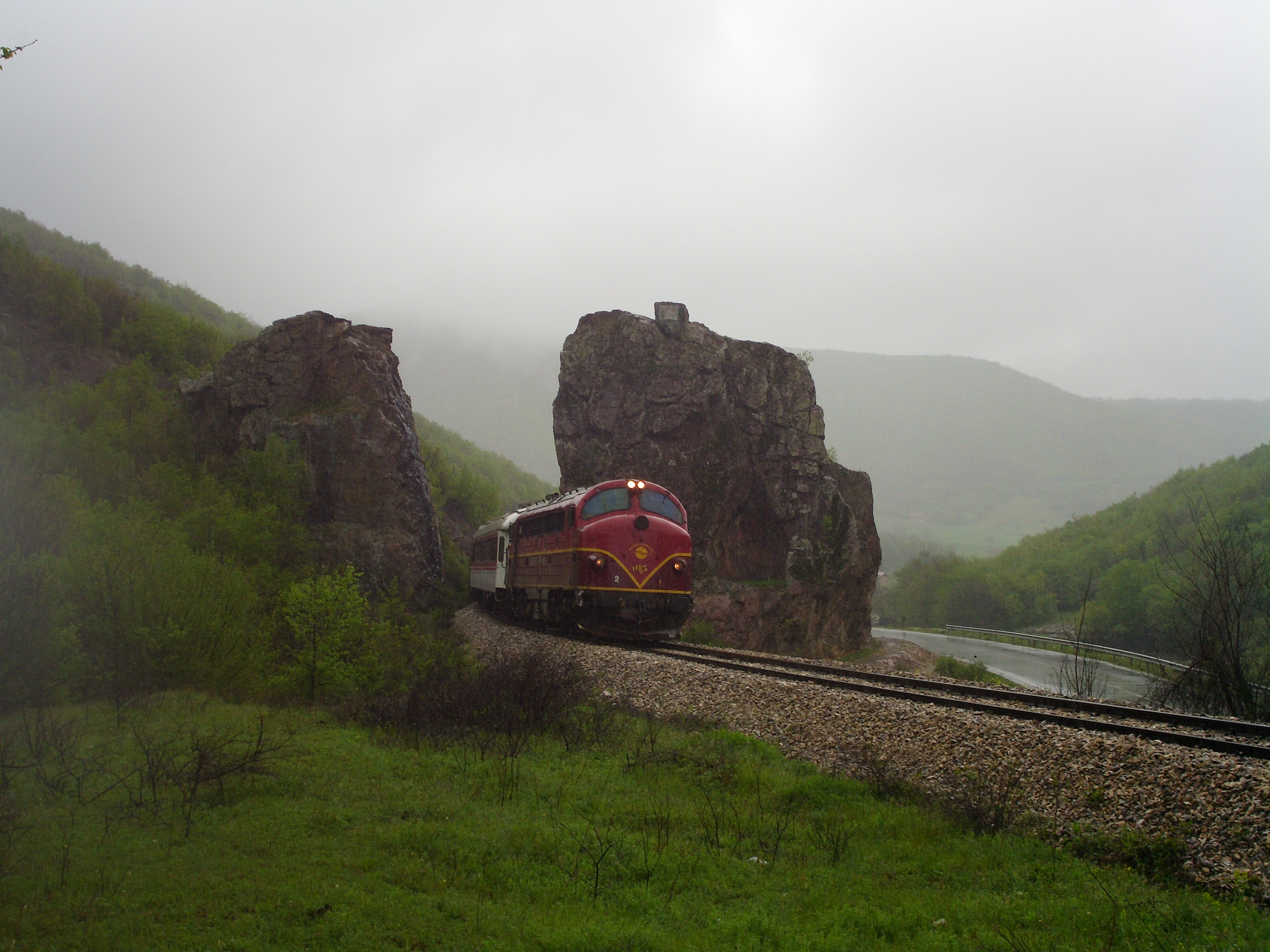
Train passing by Guri i Plakës
