= Guri i Plakës =

Rock formation in Kosovo

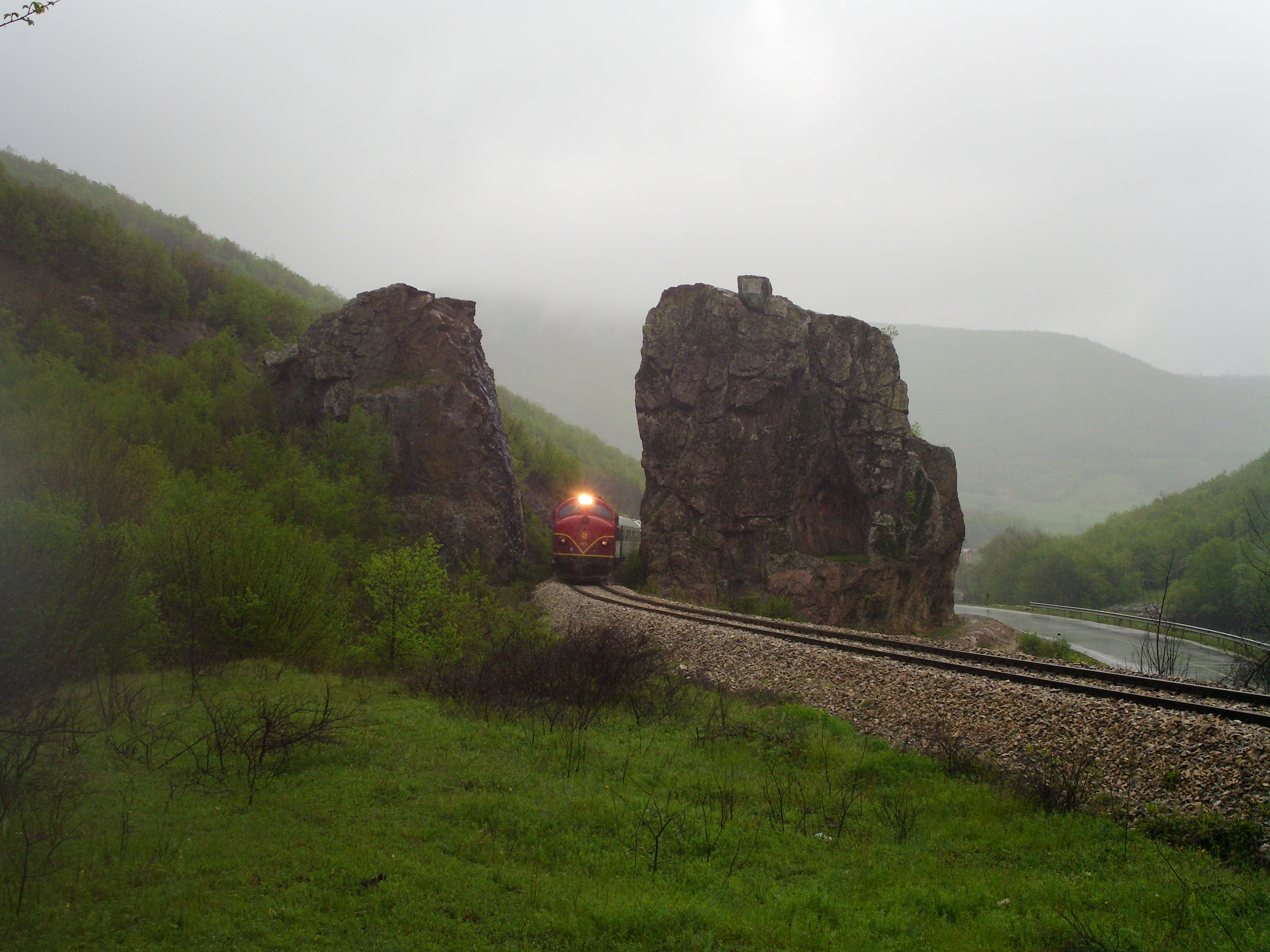

- Location within Kosovo
- Location: Dritan, Drenas, Kosovo
- Nearest city: Drenas
- Coordinates: 42°40′27″N 20°57′37″E
- Area: 0.05 ha (0.12 acres)
- Established: 2006

Guri i Plakës (lit. 'Old Woman's Stone') is a rock formation near Dritan in the municipality of Drenas. It lies at the foot of Mount Čičavica and was designated a natural monument in 2006 under the category number of MN/034.

== History ==
The rocks are next to the highway from Drenas to Obiliq, and the railway line from Kosovo Polje to Peja runs between them. A single rock was dynamited to make way for the track in 1936. Many myths and legends have arisen around the stones.

== Gallery ==
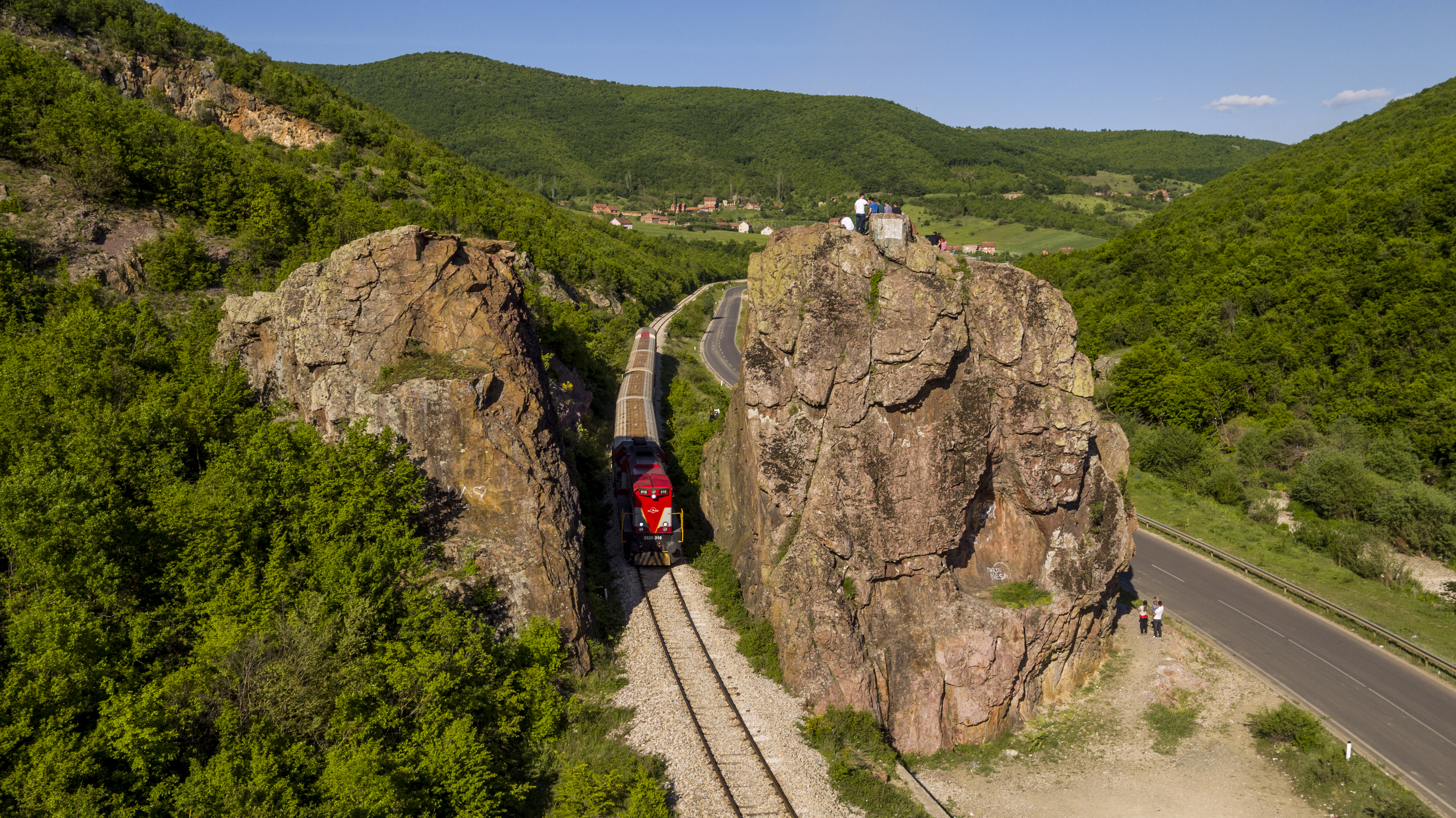
Aerial photograph

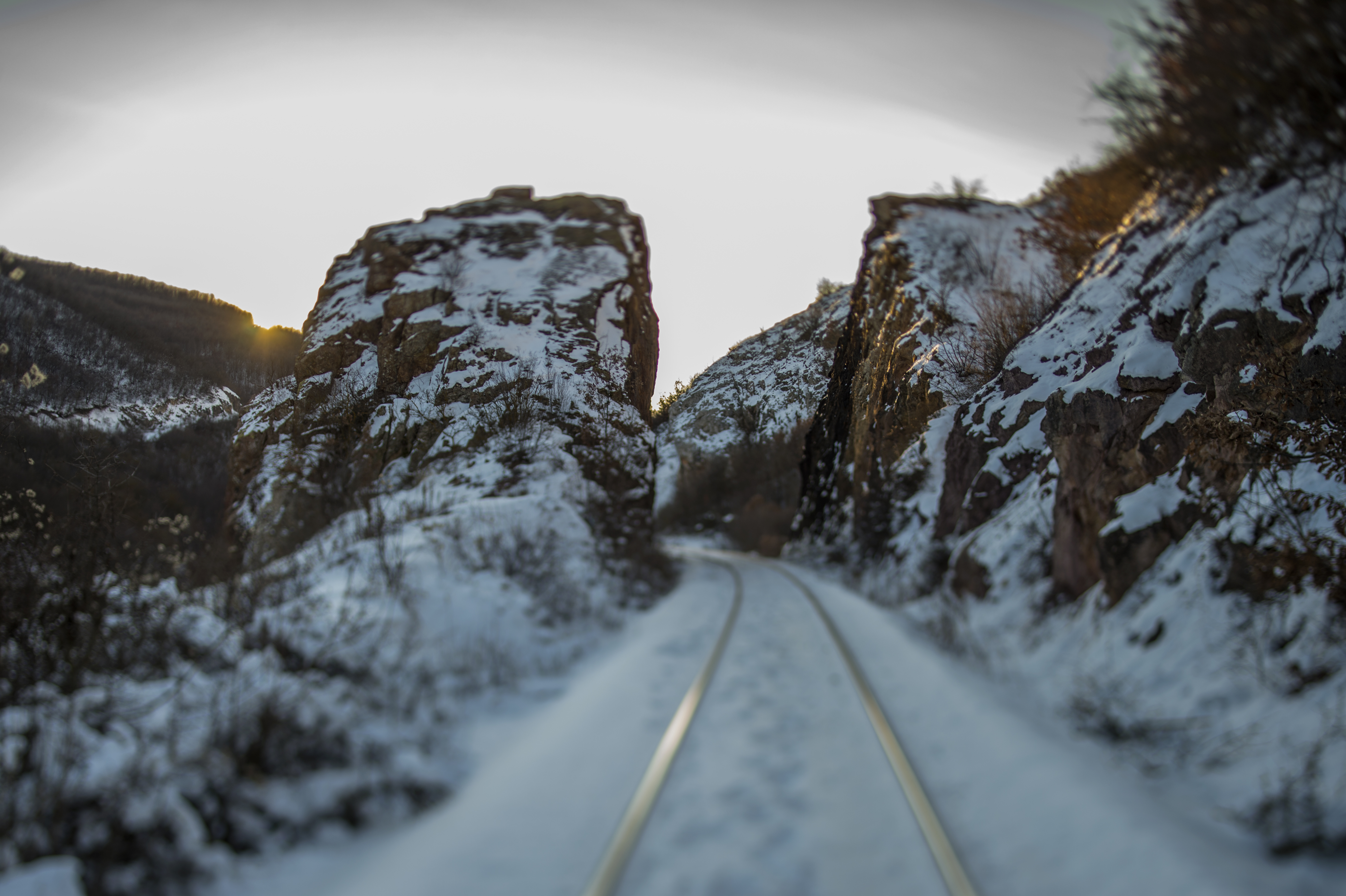
The stones in winter
