= Rifat Kukaj =

Kosovar Albanian writer (1938–2005)

- Born: October 25, 1938; Trstenik, Kosovo, Yugoslavia (modern-day Kosovo)
- Died: November 9, 2005 (aged 67)
- Occupation: writer

Rifat Kukaj (25 October 1938 – 11 September 2005) was a Kosovar Albanian writer in Albanian literature for adults and children.

== Life ==
Kukaj was born in the village of Trstenik, in Glogovac, Kosovo, then part of Yugoslavia. He was educated in Drenica and Pristina. He worked for three years in Drenica as a teacher before moving to work in Radio Pristina as an editor for culture, more specifically the editor of programmes for children. Since 1975 he worked in the editorial staff of the Publishing House "Rilindja" as editor for children literature. He died at the age of 67 on 11 September 2005, in the town of Ulcinj, Montenegro.

== Works ==
Rifat Kukaj has published over forty books. Some of his novels are "Bardhi e Mirushja", "Rrasa e zogut", "Shkrepi i diellit", "Lepuri me pesë këmbë", "Vjollca magjike", "Zogu i bardhë", "Kokërrmeli e pilivesa", "Gjeli në kuvertë", "Xhuxhi nga xhuxhishta".

Rifat Kukaj is best known for his poems for children. He has published the following volumes of poems for children: "Gjerdani i blertë", "Lejlekët në luhaja", "Vallja e kallinjve", "Deti u bëftë kos", "Çka fshin dhelpra me bisht", "Pshurrani i gjyshit", "Shtegu i laureshave", "Trimëritë e karkalecit", "Zogu i Lasgushit".

He has also published many volumes of stories, among others: "Harmonika", "Përqafimet e njoma", "Rrëfenjëza", "Ujku me kamerë", "Djaloshi i zjarreve", "Elefanti që fluturonte". He was very well known for his unique humor and was widely perceived as the pioneer of urban humor culture.

His works of poetry for adults include: "Nusja", "Qafa e Ujkonjës", "Njeriu që nuk mund të vdiste".

Rifat Kukaj has written over thirty works dramatised as radiodrama, drama, theatrical acts and so on. He wrote the script for the following films:

- Lepuri me pesë këmbë (1982)
- Qesh e ngjesh (1982) (TV)
- 2 plus (1981) (mini) TV Series
- Gëzuar viti i ri (1976) (TV)
- Bujku (1973) (TV)

Rifak Kukaj has also translated a number of books from Slovenian and Serbo-Croatian to Albanian.

He was the winner of a great number of awards and prizes for literature, among which:

- "Ismajl Qemajl Vlora" - Vlorë, Albania
- "Oton Zhupaniçiç" - Ljubljana, Slovenia
- "Ivan Goran Kovaçiq" - Zagreb, Croatia
- "Neven" - Belgrade, Serbia
- "Zmaj" - Novi Sad, Serbia
- "Shpërblimi i dhjetorit", - Pristina, Kosovo
- "Shpërblimi i nëntorit" - Pristina, Kosovo
- "Ganimete Tërbeshi" - Pristina, Kosovo
