= Izet Ibrahimi =

Albanian politician

Mayor of Drenas
- In office 01 December 2000 – 28 May 2003

Political Advisor to Jakup Krasniqi

Personal details
- Born: 1 January 1962 (age 64) Zabel i Ultë, Drenas, FPR Yugoslavia
- Party: Democratic Party (1999–2014) NISMA (2014–2016) Independent (2016–present)
- Education: University of Pristina
- Profession: Politician

Izet Ibrahimi (born 1 January 1962) is a Kosovar Albanian retired politician, and a former mayor of Drenas. He is currently a lecturer.

== Biography ==
Izet Ibrahimi was born in Zabel i Ultë in Drenas, Kosovo to Albanian parents. He finished high school in Pristina in 1981, later attending the University of Pristina, from which he graduated in 1987 with a degree in Engineering in Materials and Metallurgy.

In 1995 he enrolled in postgraduate studies at FXM. He earned the title Master of Technical Sciences. He received a Doctor of Technical Sciences from the University of Pristina in 2012.

Ibrahimi has served as the chairman of the Independent Union of "Ferronikel", chairman of the Municipal Council for Finance, and political chairman of the KLA in the "Operative Zone" of Drenas.

Following the adoption of UNSCR 1244, he co-founded the Democratic Party of Kosovo (PDK) in Drenas. He was a member of the General Board for three terms. In the first democratic elections after the Kosovo War, he ran for Mayor of Drenas and won.

After leaving the PDK, Ibrahimi founded the "Citizens Initiative for Glogovac", a political movement that opposed the misrule in Drenas. Following his retirement from politics, he is now a lecturer at the University of Pristina's Faculty of Geoscience, Department of Materials and Metallurgy.

Ibrahimi is married to Hanumshahe Zogaj, a geoscience engineer, with whom he has three children: Qëndrim, Hekuran and Erëza.
