= Çikatova Mine =

Nickel mine in Kosovo

Čikatovo mine
- Location: Çikatovë e Vjeter, District of Pristina, Kosovo
- Products: Nickel

The Čikatovo mine is one of the largest nickel mines in Kosovo. The mine is located in Çikatovë e Vjeter. The mine has reserves amounting to 22.1 million tonnes of ore grading 1.3% nickel metal.
