= Hajvalia Mine =

Lead and zinc mine in Kosovo

- Location: Pristina, Pristina, Kosovo
- Products: Lead, zinc, silver
- Company: Trepça Kosovo

The Hajvalia Mine is one of the largest lead and zinc mines in Kosovo. The mine has reserves amounting to 0.723 million tonnes of ore grading 9.65% lead, 18.26% zinc, and 126.4gr/t silver, thus resulting 69800 tonnes of lead, 132000 tonnes of zinc and 91 tonnes of silver.
