= Gllavica mine =

Mine in Kosovo

- Location: Drenas, Kosovo
- Products: Nickel, Copper, Iron, Silica, Magnesite
- Company: Ferronikeli

The Gllavica mine is one of the largest nickel mines in Kosovo. The mine is located in Drenas in Pristina district. The mine has reserves amounting to 6.24 million tonnes of ore grading 1.25% nickel, 0.05% copper, 21.53% iron, 50.89% silica and 13.52% magnesite thus resulting 96,700 tonnes of nickel, 3,120 tonnes of copper, 1,340,000 tonnes of iron, 3,180,000 tonnes of silica and 844,000 tonnes of magnesite.
