= Drazhnje mine =

Mine in Kosovo

- Location within Kosovo
- Location: Podujevë , District of Mitrovica, Kosovo; 42°50′40.99″N 21°19′0.98″E
- Products: Lead, Zinc, Silver
- Company: Lydian Internacional

The Drazhnje mine is one of the largest lead and zinc mines in Kosovo. The mine is located in Podujevë. The mine has reserves amounting to 6.7 million tonnes of ore grading 2.8% lead, 5.35% zinc and 45gr/t silver thus resulting 187,600 tonnes of lead, 358,500 tonnes of zinc and 302 tonnes of silver.
