= JOQ Albania =

Albanian online informative media platform founded in 2010

- Former name: Jeta Osh Qef
- Website type: News and information portal
- Available in: Albanian, English
- Founded: 2010
- Country of origin: Albania
- Subsidiaries: JOQ News; JOQ Travel; JOQ Sport; JOQ Kosovo; JOQ Macedonia
- Website: https://joq-albania.com/
- Launched: February 5, 2010
- Current status: Active

JOQ Albania formerly Jeta Osh Qef (English: Life is Fun) is an Albanian-language online media platform based in Albania owned by JOQ GROUP EO. Since its founding in 2010, it has become one of the largest Albanian-speaking online sources for exclusive, political, current, viral, entertainment, and general interest news from both Albania and abroad.

== Network ==
JOQ Albania maintains a strong social media presence, particularly on Facebook, Instagram and TikTok, where it publishes user-generated content submitted by Albanian citizens. The platform has over 2 million followers and operates five additional sub-channels: JOQ News, JOQ Sport, JOQ Travel, JOQ Macedonia, and JOQ Kosovo.

== Recognition and controversies ==
In 2012, JOQ Albania was reportedly recognized by the Guinness World Records for having the most commented social media post globally, with over 1 million comments. On November 28, 2019, the website was blocked without a court order by Albanian authorities, following its critical stance towards the government. The site's administrators were declared wanted by the police, prompting reactions from international press freedom organizations.
