= Çikatovë e Vjeter =

Çikatovë e Vjeter Старо Чикатово Staro Čikatovo
- Village
- Location in Kosovo
- Location: Kosovo
- District: Pristina
- Municipality: Drenas

Population (2024)
  - Total: 1,085
- Time zone: UTC+1 (CET)
  - Summer (DST): UTC+2 (CEST)

Çikatovë e Vjetër (Albanian: Çikatovë e Vjetër, Serbian: Старо Чикатово / Staro Čikatovo) is a village and quarry near Drenas in Kosovo.

During World War II, Albanians destroyed the Serbian church in the village.

== Alternative names ==
The village has a number of names in both Albanian and Serbian.

In Albanian, alternative names include:

- Qikatovë e Vjetër
- Çikatova

In Serbian, alternatives are:

- Ćikatovo (Ћикатово)
- Čikalovo (Чикалово)
