= Trpeza mine =

Mine in Kosovo

Tërpeza Mine
- Location: Malisheva, Kosovo
- Products: Gold
- Company: Lydian Internacional

The Tërpeza Mine is one of the only gold mines in Kosovo. The mine is located in Malisheva in the District of Prizren. The mine has reserves amounting to 120 million tonnes of ore grading 1.18gr/t gold thus resulting 142 tonnes of gold.
