= Iljaz Prokshi =

Kosavar writer (1949 - 2007)

Iljaz Prokshi (Serbo-Croat: Iljaz Prokši), born in 1949 in Kosovo, died 28 April 2007 in Pristina, was an ethnic Albanian writer and poet. His novels and poems covered wide range of ancient and medieval Albanian literary themes.

He studied Albanian language and literature in the University of Pristina.

His famous novel is The End of Disgruntlement, Kosovo's Book of The Year in 1997 (Fundi i Zemërimit in Albanian language). The novel depicts struggles of the writer, philosopher and Catholic Bishop Gjon Buzuku to publish his first proze in 1555 in Albanian language. In the Middle Ages, Albanian medieval scholars were not allowed to print books in Albanian language while facing occupation under Ottomans. The book explains in detail social and intellectual life of Albanians in the Middle Ages. Book's main plot narrates endeavors of the bishop to publish his book in Albanian language without getting caught by the Ottomans as publishing in Albanian constituted a death penalty under Ottoman Empire law.

Prokshi published over 15 books, hundreds of essays, stories and poems in many newspapers and journals in the albanosphere world.
