= Topanicë =

Topanicë: Topanicë (Albanian); Топоница/Toponica (Serbian)
- Village
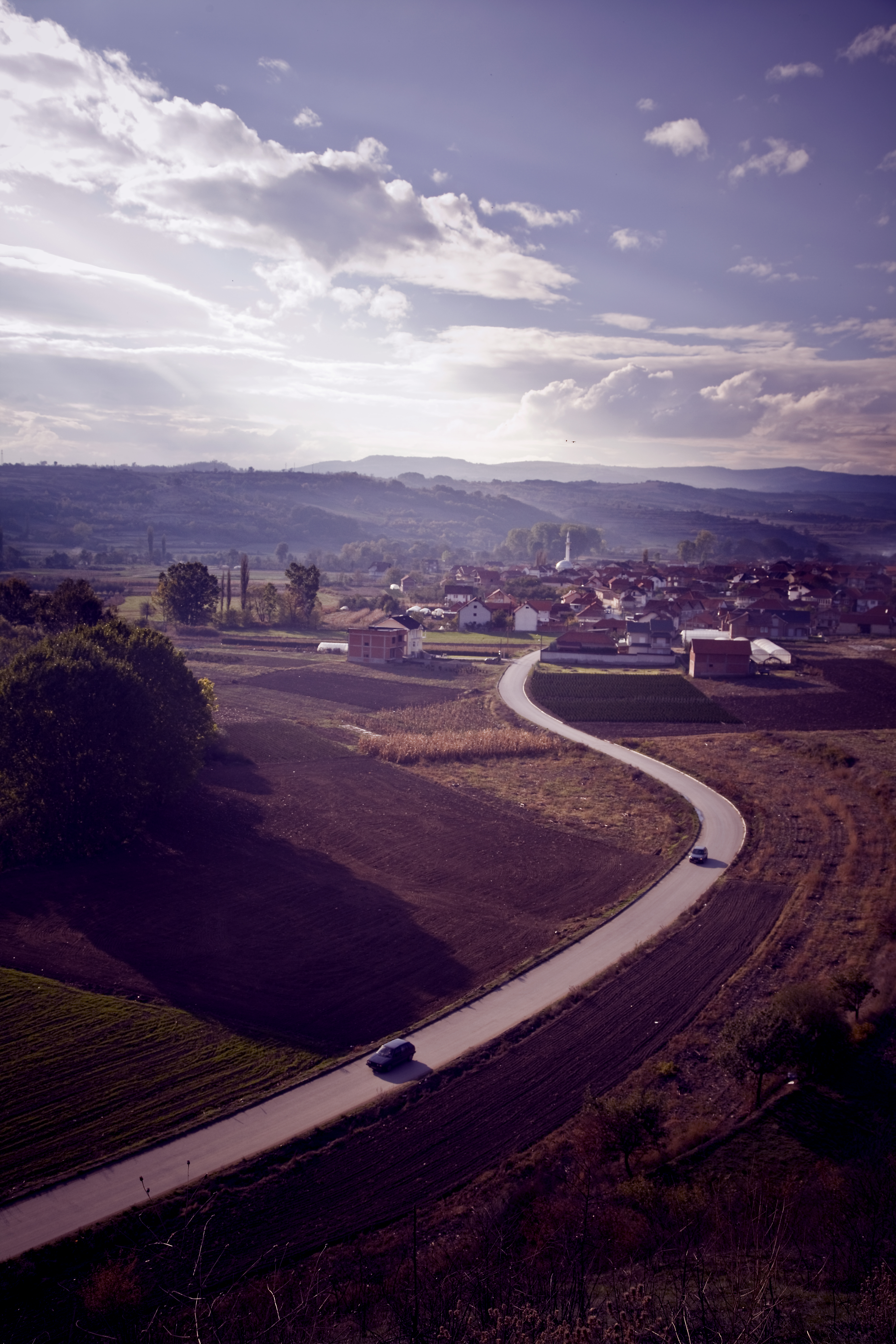
- Topanice Aerial Photograph

- Location within Kosovo
- Coordinates: 42°31′46″N 21°37′35″E
- Location: Kosovo
- District: Gjilan
- Municipality: Kamenicë

Population (2024)
  - Total: 1,286
- Time zone: UTC+1 (Central European Time)
  - Summer (DST): UTC+2 (CEST)

Topanicë is a village in the Kamenicë municipality, eastern Kosovo.
