= Dushkaja mine =

Mine in Kosovo

- Location: Drenas, Pristina district, Kosovo
- Products: Nickel, Copper, Iron, Silica, Magnesite
- Company: Ferronikeli

The Dushkaja mine is one of the largest nickel mines in Kosovo. The mine is located in Drenas in Pristina district. The mine has reserves amounting to 6.35 million tonnes of ore grading 1.29% nickel, 0.05% copper, 24.29% iron, 44.09% silica and 9.33% magnesite thus resulting 82,000 tonnes of nickel, 3,175 tonnes of copper, 1,542,400 tonnes of iron, 2,800,000 tonnes of silica and 592,500 tonnes of magnesite.
