= Bajrakli Mosque =

Bajrakli Mosque, also spelled Bayrakli (bayrak is Turkish for "flag" and Bayrakli means "with flag", thus 'flag-bearer'), or variations on that name, may refer to:

- Bajrakli Mosque, Belgrade, Serbia
- Bajrakli Mosque, Peja, Kosovo
- Bayrakli Mosque, Samokov, Bulgaria
- Bayrakli Mosque, Chios, Greece
- Bayrakli Mosque, Ioannina, Greece
- Bayrakli Mosque, Larissa, Greece
