= Komoran (village) =

Komoran Komorane
- Town
- Location in Kosovo
- Location: Kosovo
- District: Pristina
- Municipality: Glogovac

Population (2024)
  - Total: 3,354
- Time zone: UTC+1 (CET)
  - Summer (DST): UTC+2 (CEST)

Komoran (Albanian definite form: Komorani), or Komorane (Serbian Cyrillic: Коморане), is a small town south of Drenas, in Kosovo.
