= Bllacë =

Bllacë: Bllacë (Albanian); Блаце/Blace (Serbian)
- Village
- Location in Kosovo
- Location: Kosovo
- District: Prizren
- Municipality: Suharekë
- Elevation: 609 m (1,998 ft)

Population (2024)
  - Total: 2,537
- Time zone: UTC+1 (CET)
  - Summer (DST): UTC+2 (CEST)

Bllacë or Blace (Serbian Cyrillic: Блаце) is a settlement in the Suva Reka municipality in Kosovo. It lies 609 m above sea level. It is exclusively inhabited by Albanians; in the 2024 census, it had 2,537 inhabitants. It lies 8 km north of the Suva Reka city.

== Notable people ==
- Ramë Bllaca, Albanian activist

== Demographics ==
Demographic history
Ethnic group	1948	1953	1961	1971	1981	1991
Albanians					2601 (100%)	
Total	1330	1418	1527	1950	2601	3270
