= Suke mine =

Mine in Kosovo

- Location: Drenas, Pristina district, Kosovo
- Products: Nickel, Copper, Iron, Silica, Magnesite
- Company: Ferronikeli

The Suke mine is one of the largest nickel mines in Kosovo. The mine is located in Drenas in Pristina district. The mine has reserves amounting to 0.63 million tonnes of ore grading 1.36% nickel, 0.06% copper, 30.56% iron, 49.17% silica and 9.48% magnesite thus resulting 8,600 tonnes of nickel, 378 tonnes of copper, 192,500 tonnes of iron, 309,800 tonnes of silica and 59,700 tonnes of magnesite.
