= Drenas =

Town and municipality in Kosovo

Drenas: Drenas or Gllogovci (Albanian) Glogovac or Глоговац (Serbian)
- Town and municipality
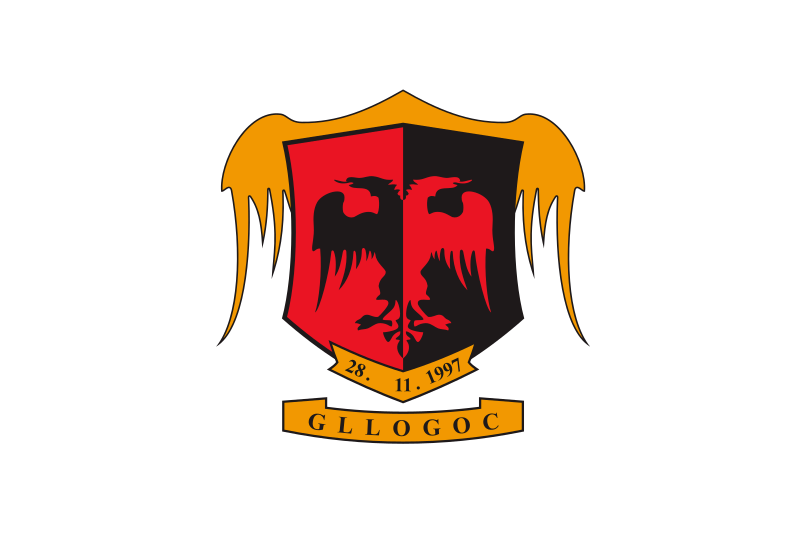
- Flag Seal
- Interactive map of Drenas
- Location within Kosovo
- Coordinates: 42°37′25″N 20°53′38″E
- Country: Kosovo
- District: Pristina
- Municipality: Drenas

Government
  - Type: Mayor–council
  - Mayor: Ramiz Lladrovci (PDKRLL)

Area
  - Municipality: 275.63 km^{2} (106.42 sq mi)
  - Rank: 22nd in Kosovo

Population (2024)
  - Municipality: 48,054
  - Density: 174.34/km^{2} (451.54/sq mi)
  - Ethnicity: 99.91% Albanians; 0.09% Other
- Time zone: UTC+1 (CET)
  - Summer (DST): UTC+2 (CEST)
- Postal code: 13000
- Area code: +383 (0) 38
- Vehicle registration: 01
- Website: kk.rks-gov.net/drenas/

Drenas or Gllogovc/Gllogoc (Albanian definite form: Drenasi or Gllogovci/Gllogoci), or Glogovac (Serbian Cyrillic: Глоговац), is a town and municipality in the district of Pristina, Kosovo. The municipality has an area of 276.63 km^{2} (106.81 sq mi). According to the last census of 2024, the municipality has a population of 48,079.

== History ==
The municipality was established before World War II as a distinct social, political, and administrative unit.

Historically, Drenas was focused on extensive agricultural development. In the 1970s, the first initiatives for economic development in Drenas began to emerge. These efforts were accompanied by urban spatial development as well.

In 1981, the settlement of Drenas was officially declared a town, becoming the main administrative, cultural, social, and municipal center of the area.

Before and during the Kosovo War (1998–1999), the ethnic Albanian separatist organization, the Kosovo Liberation Army (KLA), held significant influence and managed to control large parts of the municipality. As part of the Drenica region, the municipality was heavily affected by the conflict. During the war, forces of the Federal Republic of Yugoslavia were responsible for several massacres in the area. Mass graves were later exhumed in an attempt to conceal crimes. The status of Drenas during the Kosovo War is disputed; some sources say that Drenas was a KLA stronghold while others claim that the Serbian Police held the city.

== Geography ==
Drenas municipality is located in central Kosovo, between the Çyçavica mountains in the east and the Drenica hills in the north and west. The main road from Pristina to Peja crosses the municipality. At a junction at Komorani village, a smaller road extends north from the highway, passing through Drenas town and continuing to Skenderaj.

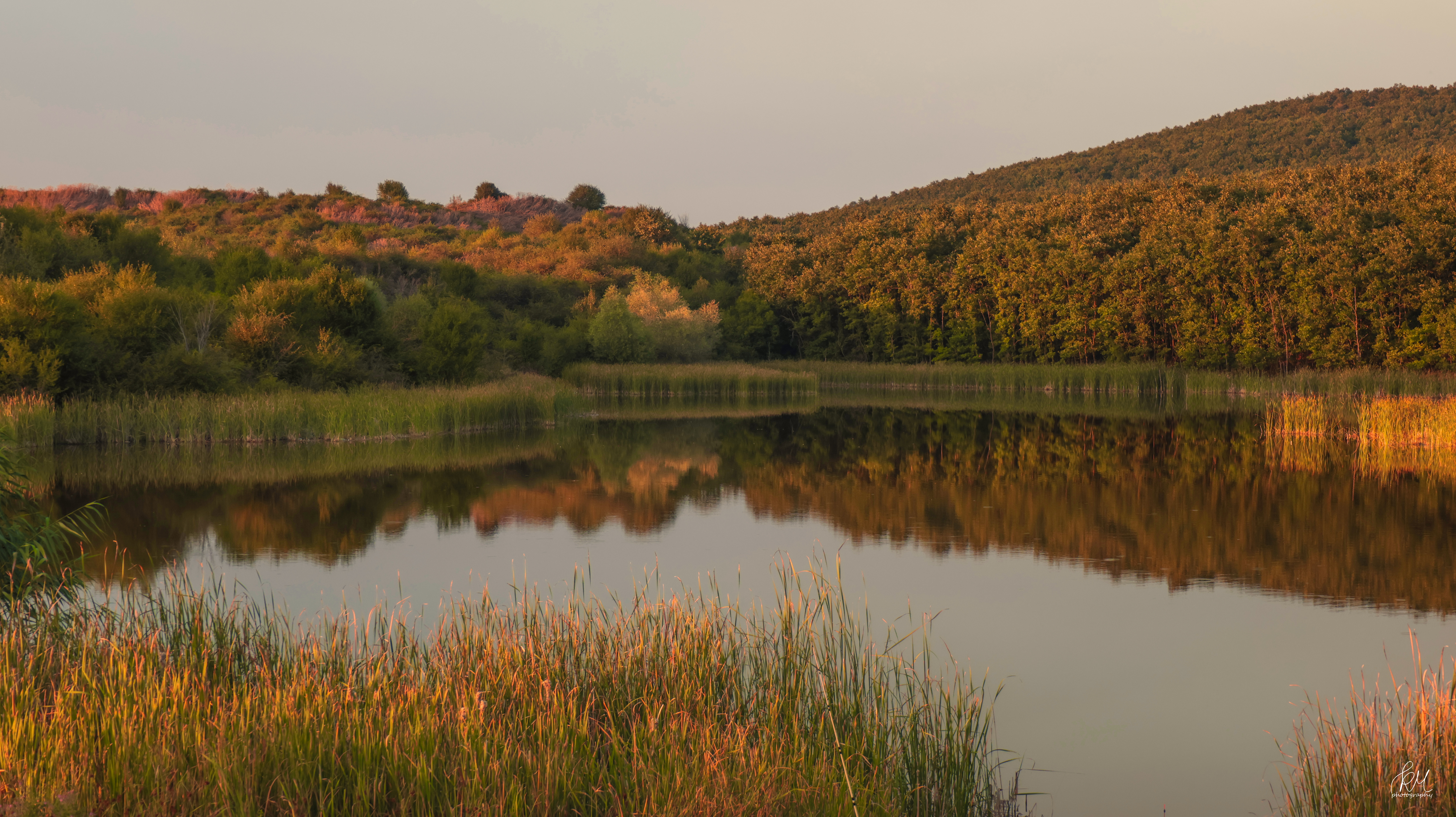
Vasileva Lake is a small lake, rich in flora and fauna.

=== Hydrology ===
The Drenica River, a left tributary of the Sitnica River, flows through the city. Within the municipality of Drenas, the small Vasileva Lake is also located.

=== Climate ===
Drenas has a humid subtropical climate (Cfa) as of the Köppen climate classification with an average annual temperature of 11.1 °C (52.0 °F). The warmest month in Drenas is August with an average temperature of 22.4 °C (72.3 °F), while the coldest month is January with an average temperature of 0 °C (32 °F).

Climate data for Drenas
Month	Jan	Feb	Mar	Apr	May	Jun	Jul	Aug	Sep	Oct	Nov	Dec	Year
Mean daily maximum °C (°F)	4.1 (39.4)	6.1 (43.0)	10.6 (51.1)	15.5 (59.9)	20.2 (68.4)	24.8 (76.6)	27.6 (81.7)	28.2 (82.8)	22.3 (72.1)	16.8 (62.2)	11 (52)	5.2 (41.4)	16.0 (60.9)
Mean daily minimum °C (°F)	−3.4 (25.9)	−2.3 (27.9)	0.8 (33.4)	5 (41)	9.9 (49.8)	14.1 (57.4)	16.4 (61.5)	16.2 (61.2)	11.9 (53.4)	7 (45)	2.3 (36.1)	−1.8 (28.8)	6.3 (43.4)
Source: Climate-Data

== Demography ==
Historical population of the settlement of Drenas
Year	Pop.	±% p.a.
1948	16,177	—
1953	17,683	+1.80%
1961	21,125	+2.25%
1971	28,188	+2.93%
1981	39,141	+3.34%
1991	53,618	+3.20%
2011	58,531	+0.44%
2024	48,079	−1.50%
Source: Kosovo Agency of Statistics

According to the last census of 2024 of the Kosovo Agency of Statistics, the municipality has a population of 48,079. The overwhelming majority of the population is Albanian (99.91%).

== Economy ==
Ferronikeli mine and smelter operation provided jobs for more than 2,000 people at the peak of its production in 1988. As of 2019, it was "the largest exporter in Kosovo, accounting for about 40% of the country's exports". While the presence of significant ore deposits was noticed as long ago as 1958, the plant was commissioned in 1984 while the Socialist FRY was in power. The deposits are of the lateritic type. Heavy damages were inflicted on the facility during the 1999 conflict, leaving it inoperable. Ferronikeli was privatised after the war by Alferon Management. Since July 2018 the most recent owners are called Balfin Group, who took over the project after it had been idle for four months. The plant contributes to the infrastructure of the municipality with power, including water supply and an electric grid. Four nickel mines operate in the region: Çikatova, Dushkaja, Gllavica and Suke.

Two quarries at Korroticë e Ulët and Çikatovë e Vjeter have become operational since the conflict.

A major development is the building of the Trade Centre, which was completed by mid-2004. The municipality played a central role in the whole process by co-ordinating the financing, construction and management of the project. The Trade Centre contains 134 shops and offices for small businesses.

== Infrastructure ==
Since 2000, there has been a gradual improvement in economic, agricultural, educational, medical and industrial growth. Municipal development has affected the construction of network-educational system, health and service network intensifying agricultural development has become especially after the construction of the irrigation system "Iber Lepenci", while a positive movement for the economy is marked by Ferronikeli, a local mining and smelting operation.

In 1936, the railway from Pristina to Peja was completed, which passed through the town of Drenas.

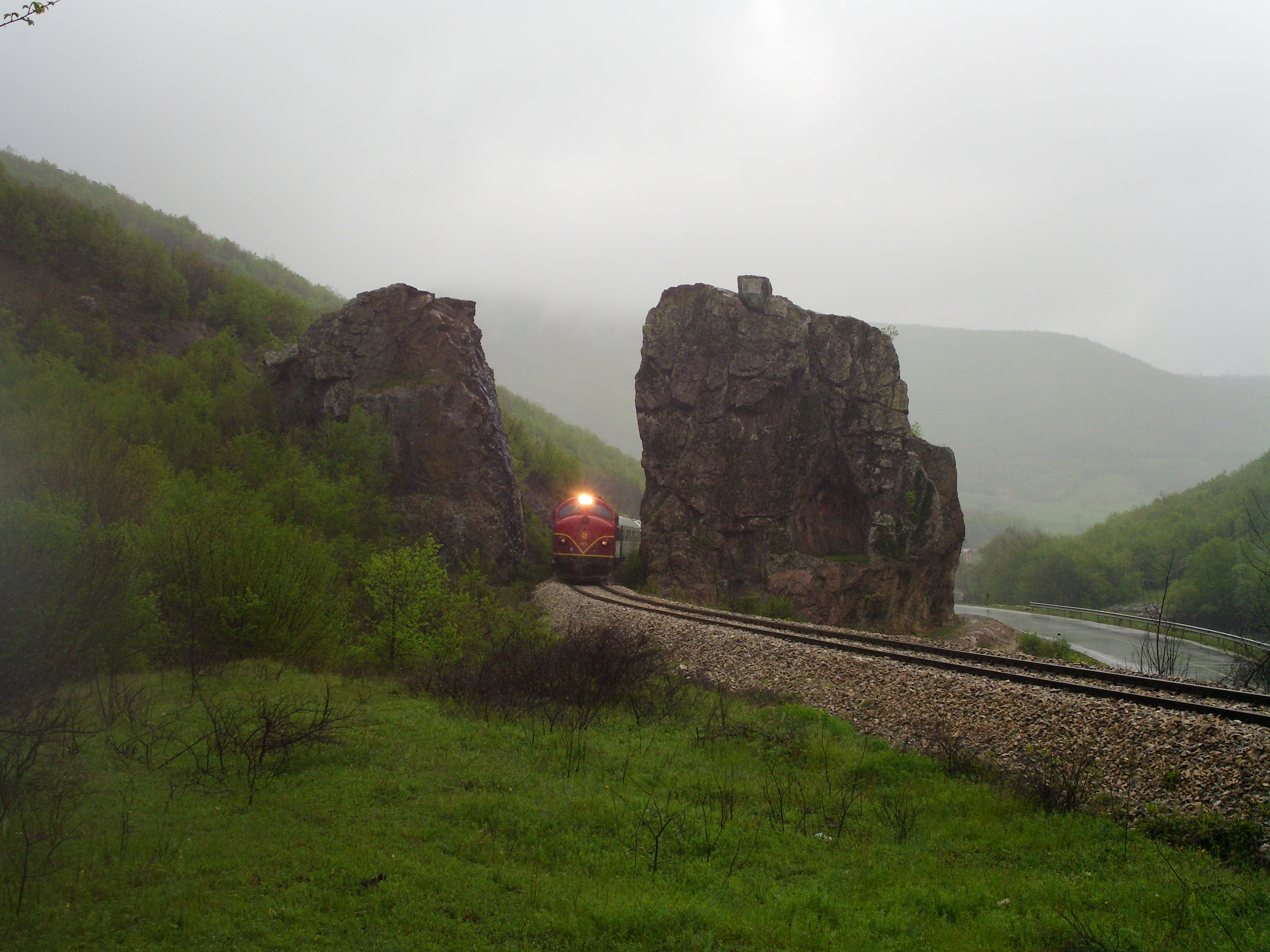
Train passing through the "Guri i Plakës" rock formation near Dritan

== Media ==
There are two Radio Stations, "92.1 Capital FM" broadcasting on a regional coverage, and "Radio Dodona" of which at the moment is not operating for unknown reasons, and there is a local TV station "Star TV" broadcasting on cable only.

=== Sports ===
- KF Feronikeli
- KB Feronikeli
- KFF Feronikeli

== Notable people ==
- Izet Ibrahimi – Former Mayor of Drenas, Phd of Metallurgy
- Jakup Krasniqi – Former Chairman of the Assembly of Kosovo
- Rifat Kukaj – Notable Poet, Writer for Children
- Iljaz Prokshi – Novelist
- Rainer Wieland – Vice President of the European Parliament, honorary citizen of Drenas
- Herolind Shala (b. 1992), Albanian footballer, born in Norway, international player for Kosovo.
- Fehmi Lladrovci – KLA commander
- Besim Mala - KLA commander and Kosovo Protection Corps commander
- Rasim Kiçina - KLA commander
