= Malisheva =

Malisheva: Malisheva or Malishevë (Albanian) Mališevo or Малишево (Serbian)
- Town and municipality
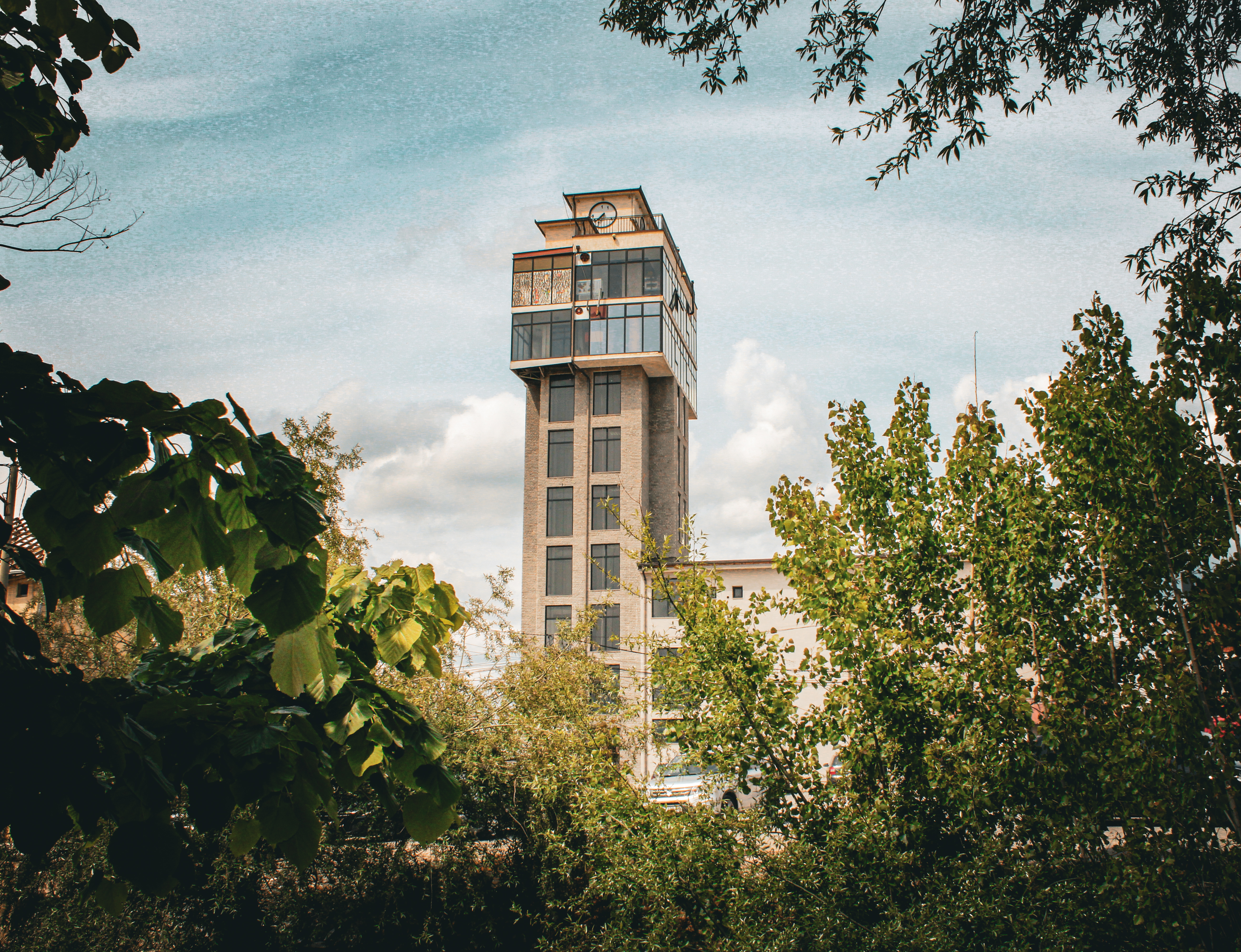
- Clocktower in Malisheva

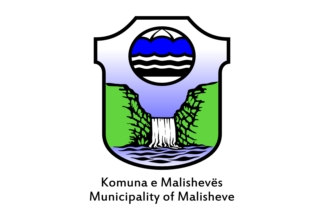
- Flag Seal
- Interactive map of Malisheva
- Location within Kosovo
- Coordinates: 42°28′58″N 20°44′46″E
- Country: Kosovo
- District: Prizren
- Municipality: Malisheva
- Municipality: 1960

Government
  - Type: Mayor–council
  - Mayor: Ekrem Kastrati (NISMA)
  - Council: Malisheva Municipal Council

Area
  - Municipality: 306.42 km^{2} (118.31 sq mi)
  - Rank: 19th in Kosovo

Population (2024)
  - Municipality: 43,888
  - Density: 143.23/km^{2} (370.96/sq mi)
  - Ethnicity: 99.84% Albanian; 0.16% Other
- Demonym(s): Albanian: Malishevas (m), Malishevase (f)
- Time zone: UTC+1 (CET)
  - Summer (DST): UTC+2 (CEST)
- Postal code: 24000
- Area code: +383 (0) 39
- Vehicle registration: 04
- Website: kk.rks-gov.net/malisheve/

Malisheva (Note: (Albanian indefinite form: Malishevë, pronounced [maliˈʃɛvə])) or Mališevo (Serbian Cyrillic: Малишево, pronounced [mali'ʃevo], Albanian: Malishevë) is a town and municipality in Kosovo. The municipality is part of the District of Prizren and it is located in the central part of Kosovo. Malisheva has a population of 43,888 inhabitants.

== History ==
The population of the town has historically been predominantly Kosovo Albanian. The town was largely destroyed by Serbian forces in 1998. Town residents only returned following the 1998 withdrawal of Serbian paramilitary police and military, in response to international pressures.

== Geography ==
Malisheva lies in the central part of Kosovo, namely in the eastern part of the Dukagjin Plain. The territory of the municipality includes an area of 306.48 km^{2} (118 sq mi), and it is bordered by the municipalities of Drenas, Lipjan, Suhareka, Rahovec and Klina. The suitable configuration of the terrain enables the municipality to have good traffic connections with the whole country. Most of the main cities of Kosovo are connected within a distance of about 40-55 km.

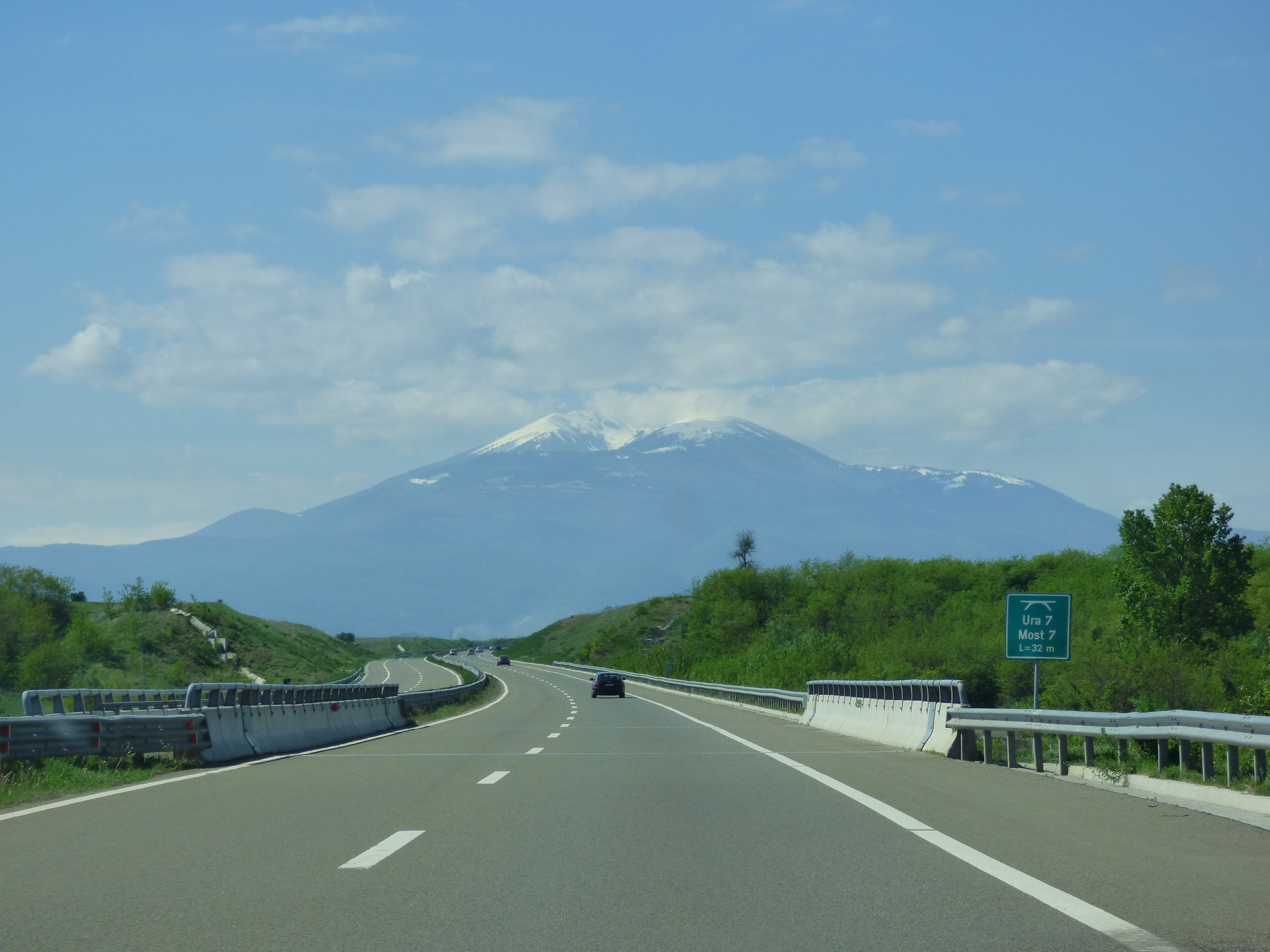
The R 7 Motorway near Malisheva

As for international connections, the passage of the Durrës - Merdarë highway through the territory of the municipality puts Malisheva in a favorable position. This highway allows easy and fast connection with Albania and the port of Durrës, while the plans for the further continuation of this highway, as well as the construction of the new highway for Hani i Elezit will enable quality connections with the states and regional transport corridors.

=== Climate ===
The dominant climate is the medium continental climate dominated with various Mediterranean elements, which is characterized by cold and long winters (in the mountain villages); warm summer (in lower villages). The average temperature is 24.6 °C (76 °F) in summer and −10 °C (14 °F) in winter. The average amount of precipitation is close to 755.5 mm (29.74 in).

=== Hydrography ===
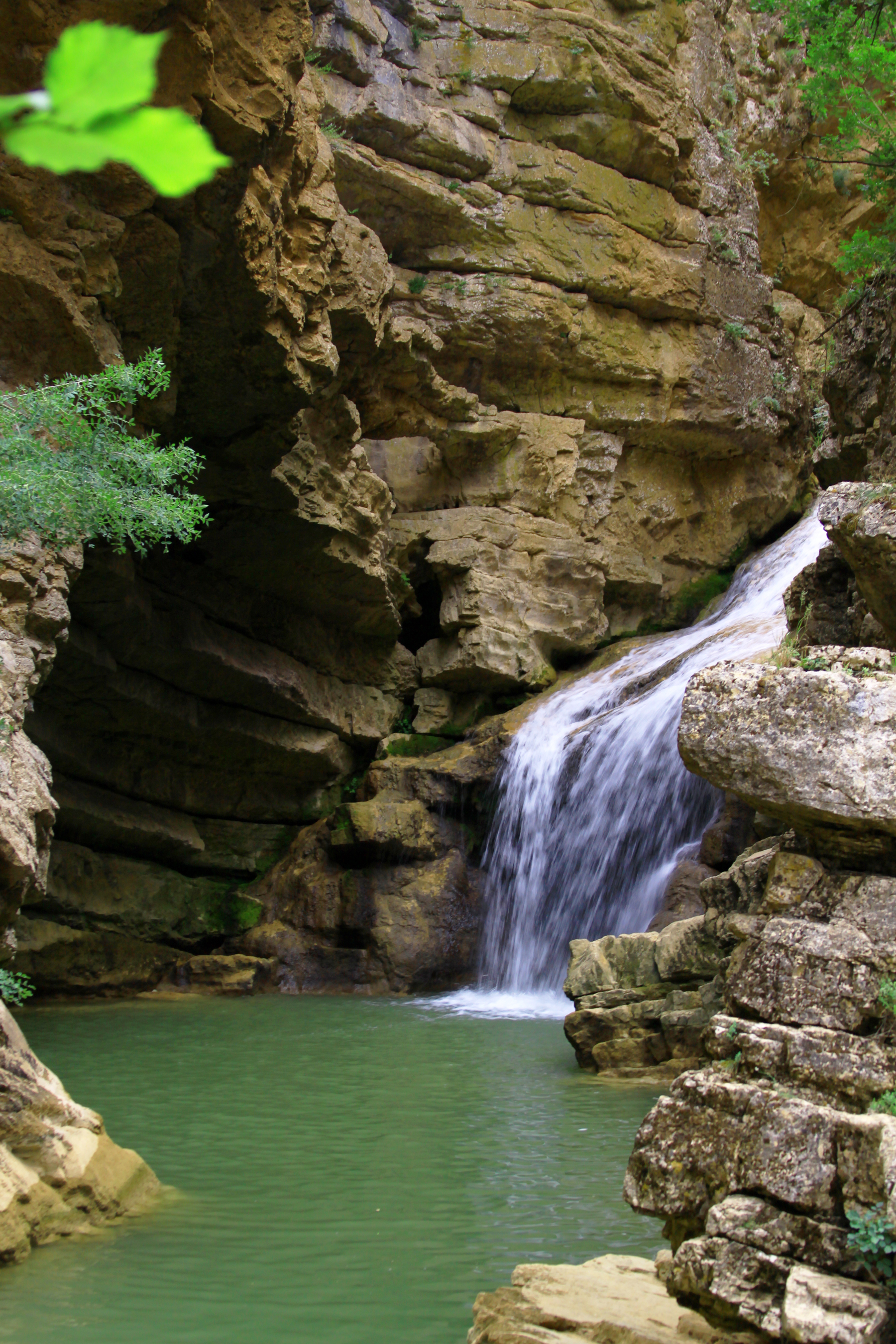
The Mirusha waterfalls, a Natural Monument

The main river that passes through the municipality of Malisheva is Mirusha, which belongs to the White Drini basin. In the lower part of the Mirusha river, in a length of 2 km, a gorge has been created with 16 river lakes of different sizes, connected to each other with a spectacular waterfall with a length of 21 m called Mirusha waterfalls (the second largest in Kosovo after that in Radavc-Drini i Bardhë). Considering the environmental values that the Mirusha contains in its course and the surrounding spaces, the area around it has been declared a Natural Monument of Special Importance.

== Demography ==
According to the 2024 census by the Kosovo Agency of Statistics (KAS), Malisheva has a population of 43,888. The population is predominantly ethnic Albanian, with 99.8% of inhabitants identifying as such.

== See also ==
- Trpeza mine
