= Energy in Serbia =

Energy in Serbia is dominated by fossil fuels, despite the public preference for renewable energy.

In 2021 Serbia's total energy supply was almost 700 PJ, with the energy mix comprising coal (45%), oil (24%), gas (15%), and renewables (16%). Bioenergy and hydroelectric power were the leading contributors within the renewable energy category, accounting for 67% and 29% of the renewable supply, respectively.

== History ==
On 6 October 1893, the first Serbian power plant, located in the Dorćol urban neighborhood of Belgrade, began production of electricity.

In 1900, the first alternating current hydroelectric power plant Pod gradom in Užice on the river Đetinja went online. The first alternating current transmission line from hydroelectric power plant Vučje to Leskovac, with the length of 17 kilometres (11 mi), went online three years later. In 1909, hydroelectric plants Gamzigrad in Zaječar and Sveta Petka in Niš began to build. Two years later, the hydroelectric power station on the river Moravica in Ivanjica was put in the operation.

In Belgrade, the power plant Snaga i Svetlost was built in 1933, being one of the largest in the Balkans at that time.

The establishment of the Električno preduzeće Srbije followed in 1945. Between 1947 and 1950, the hydroelectric power plant Sokolovica and coal power plants Mali Kostolac and Veliki Kostolac, the first power stations to be built in Serbia after the Second World War. In 1952, the underground mining of the coal field Kolubara had started. Four years later, coal power plant TPP Kolubara went in operation. A year earlier, the hydroelectric power plants Vlasina and Zvornik have been connected to the power grid. In the period from 1960 to 1967, hydroelectric power plants Bistrica, Kokin Brod and Potpeć were under construction.

In the period from 1942 to 1943, Serbia conducted the first exploration potential of oil field. The first drill hole was made in 1947 in Banat (Velika Greda), and in 1949 founded the company Naftagas.

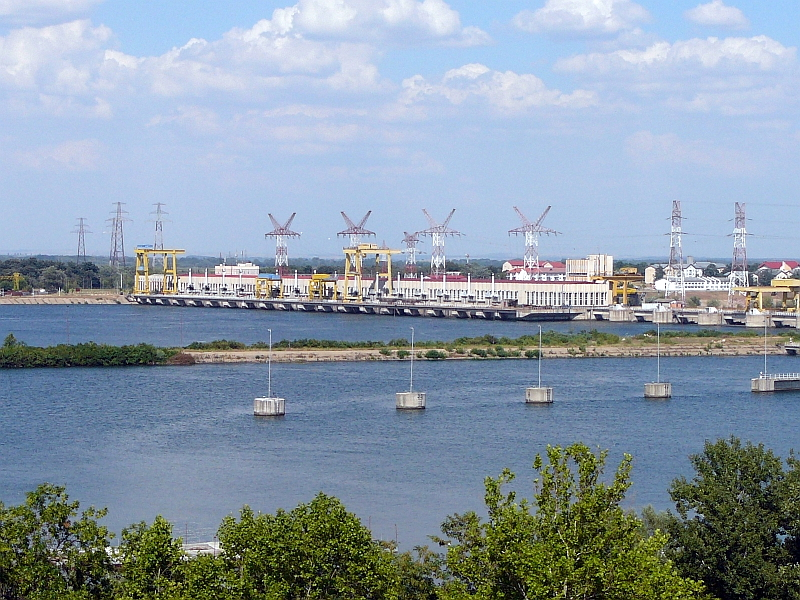
Đerdap II (Serbia)

In 1965, Združeno elektroprivredno preduzeće Srbije was founded. The coal-fired power plant Bajina Bašta began with the production of electricity a year later. The two largest power plants in Serbia, the hydroelectric power plant HPP Đerdap I at the Danube river and the coal power plant TENT, went into operation in 1970. Twelve years later, the pumped storage plant Bajina Bašta was built, and in 1990 the hydroelectric power station Pirot was put into operation.

In 2010 the framework agreement for Kostolac B3 was signed with the contractor, China Machinery Engineering Corporation (CMEC). The construction started in 2017, and the power plant unit was commissioned in 2024; it has an installed capacity of 350 MW with a net efficiency level of 37.3%.

In late 2020, the Balkan Stream, a pipeline running from Russia to Serbia through Bulgaria and Turkey (considered an extension of TurkStream), completed construction to deliver natural gas. However, the Balkan Stream came with political troubles for Bulgaria. In order to diversify its gas supplies, another interconnector and pipeline through Bulgaria was constructed in December 2023, transporting natural gas from Azerbaijan to Serbia.

== Electricity ==
=== Generation ===
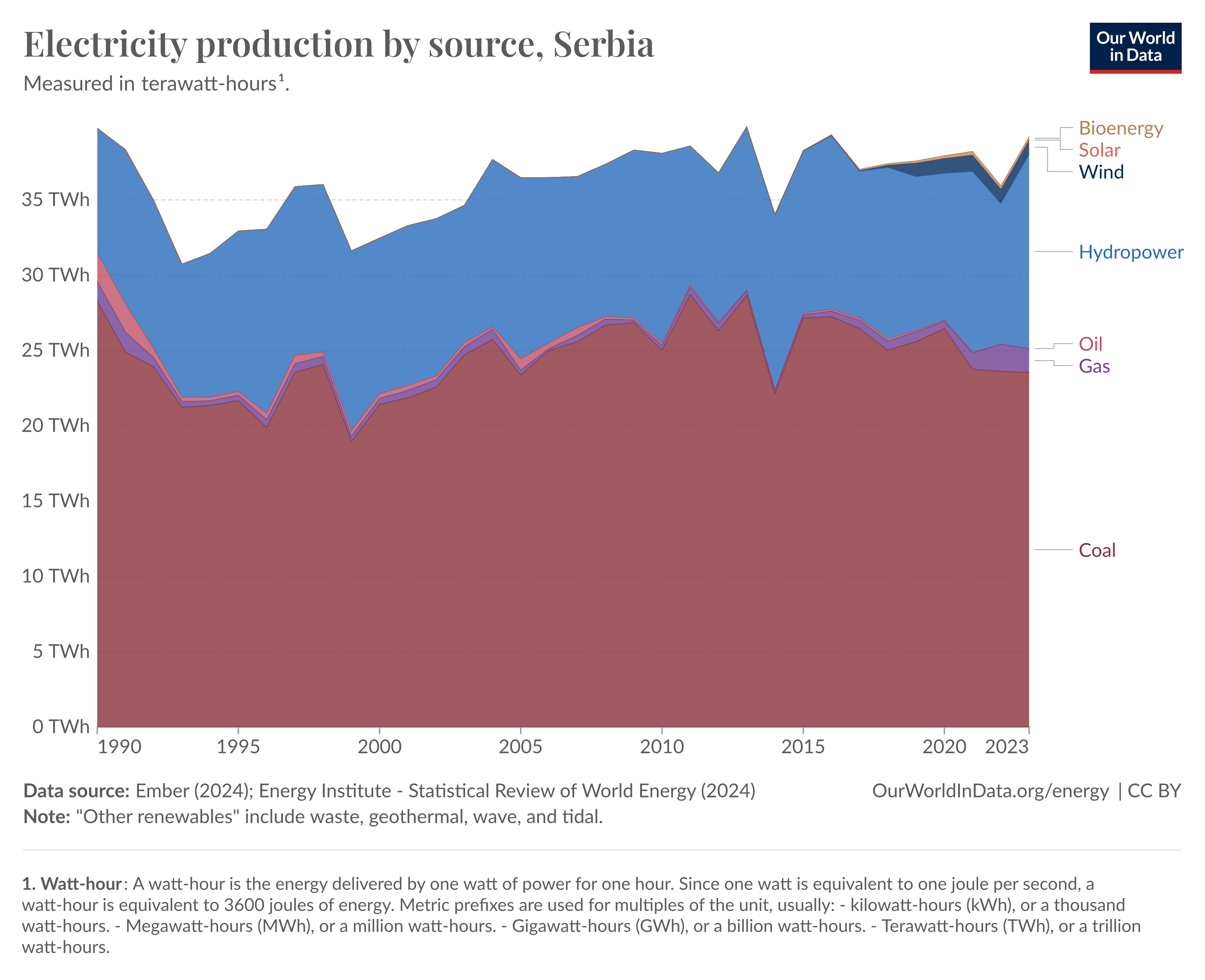
Serbia electricity production by source

The main producer and supplier of electricity in Serbia is state-owned Elektroprivreda Srbije (EPS). The company has an installed capacity of 7,759 MW and generates 30.56 TWh of electricity per year. Its installed capacity in lignite-fired thermal power plant is 4,360 MW, gas-fired and liquid fuel-fired combined heat and power plants is 296 MW, and hydropower plants is 3,026 MW. Through the wind power, Serbia generates 1.35 TWh per year (as of 2024).

EPS is also the largest producer of lignite in Serbia operating in the Kolubara and Kostolac basins, producing around 32.79 million tonnes per year (as of 2025).

On the following table is an overview of the electricity generation by source since 2017:

Electricity generated in Serbia
	2017		2018		2019		2020		2022		2023		2024	
Type	GWh	%	GWh	%	GWh	%	GWh	%	GWh	%	GWh	%	GWh	%
Coal	23,864	72.10	22,546	65.29	22,720	68.30	23,935	70.34	21,182	61.77	21,100	66.62	20,923	61.03
Hydro	8,740	26.41	11,329	32.81	9,027	27.14	8,609	25.30	10,953	31.94	8,134	25.68	9,932	28.97
Gas	351	1.06	399	1.15	472	1.42	317	0.93	828.7	2.42	1,240	3.91	1,682	4.91
Wind	48	0.15	124	0.36	913	2.74	963	2.83	1,068	3.11	934	2.95	1,332	3.89
Biomass	72	0.22	120	0.35	115	0.35	189	0.56	244.3	0.71	250	0.79	290	0.85
Solar	13	0.04	10	0.03	16	0.05	13	0.04	13.5	0.04	16	0.05	120	0.35
Unspecified fossil	11	0.03	(3)	(0.01)	0.5	0.00	0.6	0.00	1	0.01	1.28	<0.01	3.5	0.01
Total	33,100	100	34,525	100	33,263	100	34,028	100	34,292	100	31,675	100	34,286	100

Shifting from coal to renewable sources, and therefore the need for new hydro, wind and solar generation plants, is a recognized goal in the Serbian politics. In July 2021, the country's energy and mining minister stated in an interview that the new energy strategy was under preparation, under it up to 50% electricity would be generated from renewable sources by 2040; later in November 2021 she said in another interview that "by 2040 or 2050 (Serbia) should have zero lignite (consumption)" and that such shift would require minimum 17 billion euro investment.

=== Transmission and distribution ===
While Elektroprivreda Srbije (EPS) is responsible for mining and electricity generation, Elektromreža Srbije (EMS) is responsible for the electric power transmission, and Elektrodistribucija Srbije (ED) for the electric power distribution.

=== Laws ===
In order to increase the efficiency of the sector through the action of market mechanisms in the production and supply of electricity, the Government of Serbia has introduced competition in the electricity sector by adopting the Law on Energy in 2004. All electricity consumers are tariff buyers which are, according to the law, provided by electricity retailer responsible to supply tariff customers within Elektroprivreda Srbije at regulated prices. At the same time, buyers who meet the criteria according to the Act are given the opportunity to become a qualified buyers, and thus get the opportunity to purchase electricity on the open market. In the first phase, the electricity market has been open to all potential customers with an annual electricity consumption was above 25 GWh. From 1 January 2007, the Council of the Energy Agency of the Republic of Serbia made decision that the right to acquire the status of an eligible customer is available to all electricity customers with an annual consumption of more than 3 GWh.

== Oil and natural gas ==
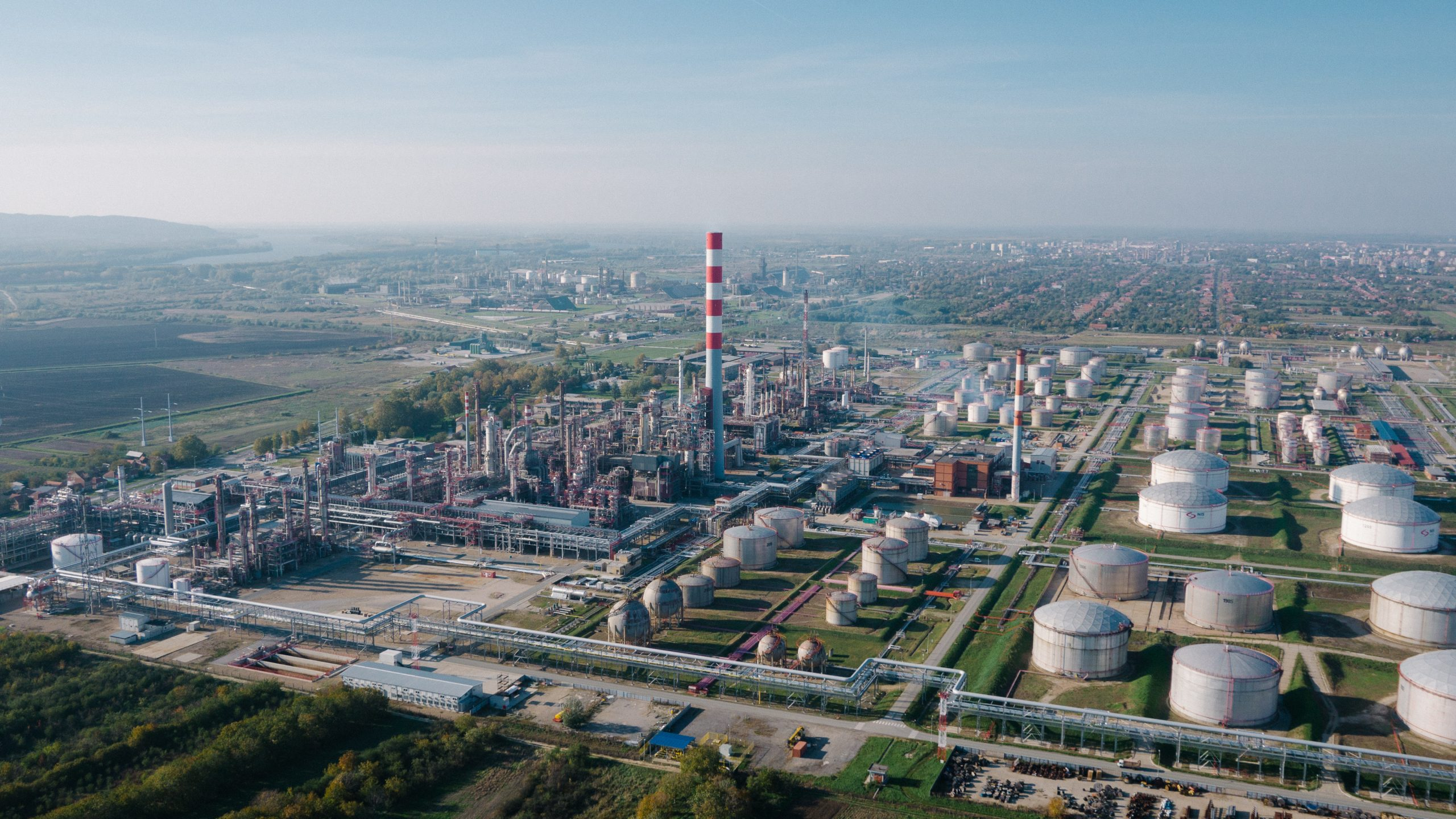
NIS refinery in Pančevo

Naftna Industrija Srbije (NIS) is the only company in Serbia which deals with exploration and production of crude oil and gas, as well as with production of geothermal energy. The company disposes with all necessary equipment for the performance of a whole range of complex activities such as geophysical exploration, control of production of crude oil, gas and geothermal energy. The majority of NIS oil fields are located on the territory of Serbia, in Banat region, but upstream has business operations both in Serbia and abroad. In 2011 NIS started to expand business in Southeast Europe: in Bosnia and Herzegovina, Romania and Hungary.

The company owns and operates oil refineries in Pančevo (annual capacity 4.8 million tons of crude oil) and Novi Sad (annual capacity 2.6 million tons of crude oil), and natural gas refinery in Elemir. NIS refining complex produces a whole range of petroleum products – from motor gasoline and diesel fuel to mechanical lube oils and feedstock for the petrochemical industry, heavy fuel oil, road and industrial bitumen, etc.

Srbijagas, public gas company, operates the natural gas transportation system which comprise 3,177 kilometers of trunk and regional natural gas pipelines and a 450 million cubic meter underground gas storage facility at Banatski Dvor.

- Refined petroleum products – production: 60,220 barrels per day (9,574 m^{3}/d)
- Oil – production: 23,160 barrels per day (3,682 m^{3}/d)
- Oil – consumption: 81,540 barrels per day (12,964 m^{3}/d) (2011)
- Oil – proved reserves: 77.5 million barrels (12.32×10^{6} m^{3}) (1 January 2006)
- Natural gas – production: 557 million cubic meters (2012)
- Natural gas – consumption: 2.84 billion cubic meters (2012)

In a 2022 IEA commentary, it was noted that Serbia relies entirely on Russian gas imports. The country signed a three-year contract with Gazprom in May 2022 for 2.2 billion cubic meters annually. The anticipated Bulgaria-Serbia interconnector, offering 1.8 billion cubic meters per year from Bulgaria, is expected to diversify Serbia's gas sources. This 170km pipeline, becoming operational in December 2023, will allow gas to be supplied to Serbia from Azerbaijan, with whom Serbia has signed a supply agreement.

== Renewable energy ==
Bioenergy and hydroelectric power were the leading contributors within the renewable energy category, accounting for 67% and 29% of the renewable supply, respectively. Installed capacity of hydropower is 2,835 MW and as of December 2019 wind power capacity is 500 MW. Serbia also makes use of geothermal and solar energy, currently 27% of Serbia's electricity comes from hydro while 4% comes from other renewables. Additional 600 MW of wind capacity is planned by 2030.

As of 20 November 2024, Serbia's installed capacity of electricity from solar sources was estimated to be 166 MW.

== See also ==
- List of power stations in Serbia
- Energy use
- Energy Community
