= Elektroprivreda Srbije =

Serbian electric utility company

- Native name: Електропривреда Србије
- Type: Joint-stock company
- Industry: Electric utility
- Predecessor: Električno preduzeće Srbije (1945–1965); Združeno Elektroprivredno preduzeće Srbije (1965–1991)
- Founded: 1 July 2005; 21 years ago (current form); 1991; 35 years ago (founded)
- Headquarters: Belgrade, Serbia
- Area served: Serbia
- Key people: Oluf Ulseth (Supervisory Board Chairman); Dušan Živković (acting director)
- Products: Electric power Coal
- Production output: 30,356 GWh (2025); 32.79 million tonnes of coal (2025)
- Services: Electricity generation, electricity retailing, mining
- Revenue: ▲€3.927 billion (2025)
- Net income: ▲€329.83 million (2025)
- Total assets: ▲€9.258 billion (2025)
- Total equity: ▲€5.814 billion (2025)
- Owner: Government of Serbia (100%)
- Number of employees: ▼18,826 (2025)
- Subsidiaries: EPS Trgovanje Ljubljana
- Website: eps.rs
- Footnotes; Business ID: 20053658; Tax ID: 103920327

Elektroprivreda Srbije (EPS; Serbian Cyrillic: Електропривреда Србије, ЕПС; full legal name: Javno preduzeće Elektroprivreda Srbije Beograd) is a joint-stock electric utility power company fully owned by the Government of Serbia, with headquarters in Belgrade, Serbia. It was founded in 1991 and it has 18,826 employees (as of 2025), making it the largest enterprise in the country.

As of 2025, the company has an installed capacity of 7,759 MW and generates 30,356 GWh of electricity per year. Its installed capacity in lignite-fired thermal power plant is 4,360 MW, gas-fired and liquid fuel-fired combined heat and power plants is 297 MW, and hydro power plants is 3,026 MW. EPS also operates three power plants of total capacity 461 MW which are not in the ownership of the company.

EPS is also the largest producer of lignite in Serbia operating in the Kolubara and Kostolac basins, producing around 32.79 million tonnes per year (as of 2025).

== History ==
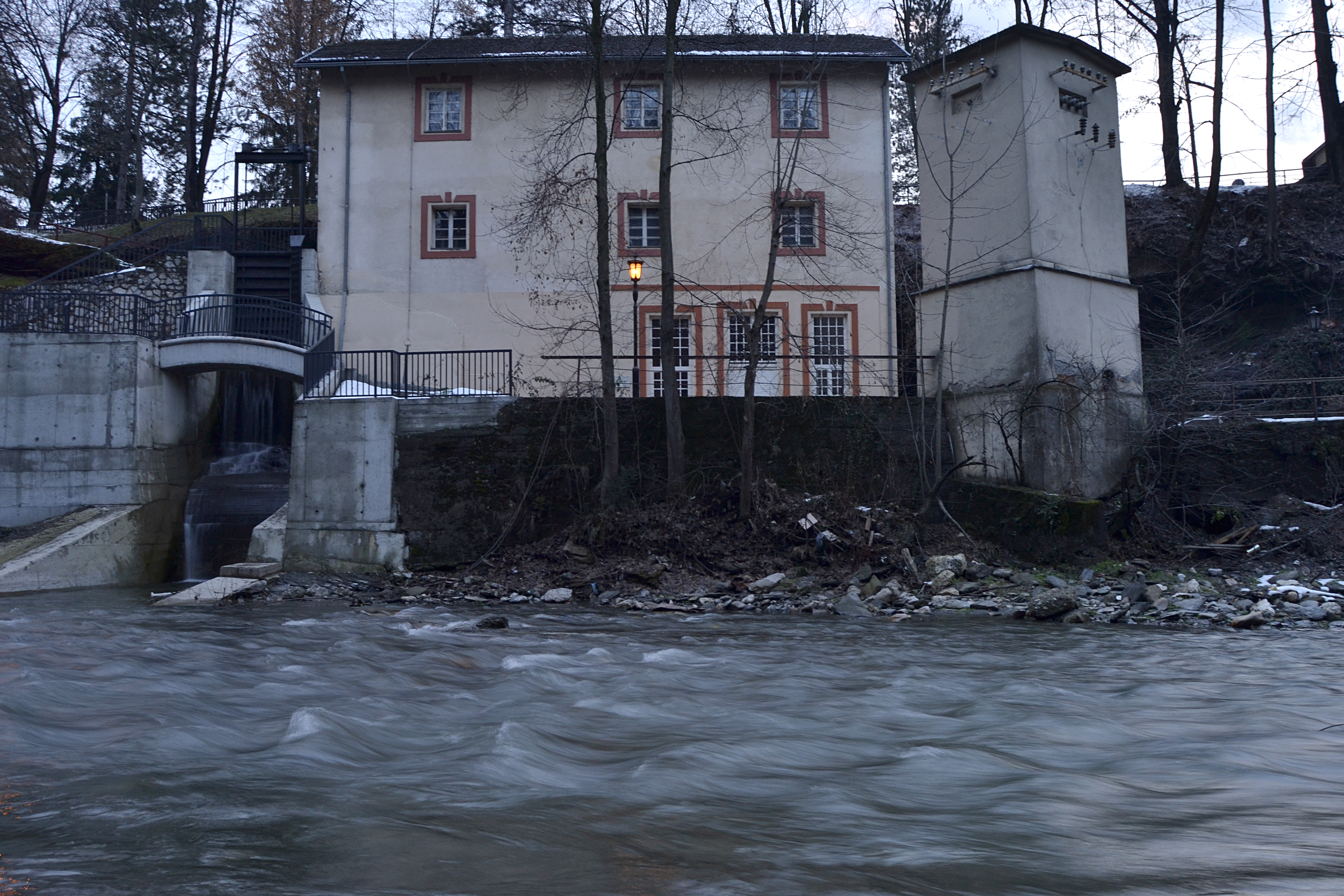
Ivanjica's 1911 HPP building

Since 1870, the coal production has begun in Serbia. Fourteen years later, the first electric lighting in Serbia was furnished in the military office building in Kragujevac. On 6 October 1893, the first Serbian power plant in Belgrade started with the production of electricity.

In 1900, the first alternating current hydroelectric power plant Pod gradom in Užice on the river Đetinja went online. This power plant is still operating. The first alternating current transmission line from hydroelectric power plant Vučje to Leskovac, with the length of 17 kilometres (11 mi), went online three years later. In 1909, hydroelectric plants Gamzigrad in Zaječar and Sveta Petka in Niš began to build. Two years later, the hydroelectric power station on the river Moravica in Ivanjica was put in the operation.

In Belgrade, the power plant Snaga i Svetlost was built in 1933, being one of the largest in the Balkans at that time.

1945–1991

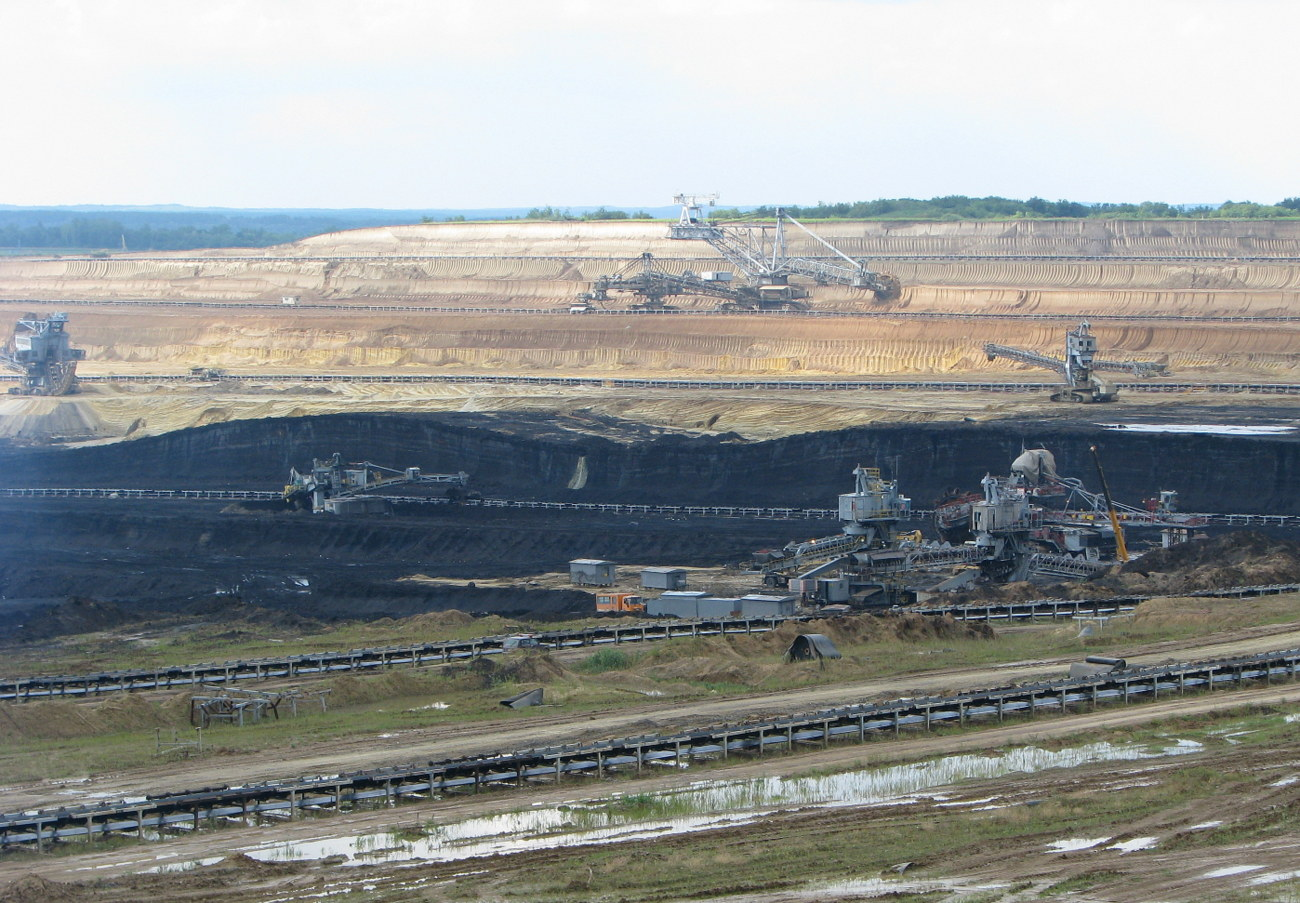
Surface coal mine near Drmno

The establishment of the Električno preduzeće Srbije followed in 1945. Between 1947 and 1950, the hydroelectric power plant Sokolovica and coal power plants Mali Kostolac and Veliki Kostolac, the first power stations to be built in Serbia after the Second World War. In 1952, the underground mining of the coal field Kolubara had started. Four years later, coal power plant Kolubara went in operation. A year earlier, the hydroelectric power plants Vlasina and Zvornik have been connected to the power grid. In the period from 1960 to 1967, hydroelectric power plants Bistrica, Kokin Brod and Potpeć were under construction.

In 1965, Združeno elektroprivredno preduzeće Srbije was founded. The coal-fired power plant Bajina Bašta began with the production of electricity a year later. The two largest power plants in Serbia, the hydroelectric power plant HPP Đerdap I at the Danube river and the coal power plant TENT, went into operation in 1970. Twelve years later, the pumped storage plant Bajina Bašta was built, and in 1990 the hydroelectric power station Pirot was put into operation.

1991–2005

In 1991, the company was reorganized and changed name to Elektroprivreda Srbije.

During the NATO bombing of Yugoslavia in 1999, many power plants have been severely damaged. With the establishment of the UNMIK administration in Kosovo on 1 July 1999, the company lost its access to the local coal mines and power plants, including Kosovo A and Kosovo B power plants.

Since then, government-owned Elektroprivreda Srbija by political decision continued to pay off earnings to all of Kosovo-based EPS companies - EPS Surface Mining Kosovo, EPS TPP Kosovo and EPS Elektrokosmet. However, all these employees are not working in Kosovo-based power plants, and are only occasionally and indirectly employed by EPS throughout the rest of Serbia. As of May 2009, there was a total of around 7,000 such employees which were working only on paper and receive regular earnings. As of June 2017, that number was cut to 4,539 employees. As of August 2022, a total of 3,300 employees worked for these three companies.

Following the stabilization of the country after war, in 2004 EPS was again a member of the European interconnected system UCTE.

2005–2013

Company operates in the current form since 1 July 2005. Then, the electric power transmission division of EPS was split from the company and established as its own public enterprise, named Elektromreža Srbije (EMS).

Since 2007, EPS has prepared plans for the construction of new power plants and the expansion of existing plants to increase generating capacity and meet growing consumption demand.

2013–2023

EPS de facto holds a monopoly on the electricity market in Serbia. Since 1 January 2013, the Serbian electricity market has been open to other companies with the expectations to be completely liberalized in the coming years. Since then, EPS has continued with further reorganization for better company's effectiveness. In 2014, EPS was split into two subsidiaries - EPS Distribucija Belgrade and EPS Trgovanje Ljubljana. In June 2021, the distribution system section of the company "EPS Distribucija" was split from the company, and continued to operate as an independent company named "Elektrodistribucija Srbije d.o.o. Beograd".

2023–present

In April 2023, the Government of Serbia decided to transform the company from the state-owned enterprise to a joint-stock company – offering 36.5 million of shares, each worth 10 thousand dinars (at the time, 85.26 euros each), for a cumulative worth of stock at 3.112 billion euros.

== Market and financial data ==
In 2011, company's total assets and the equity increased for nearly 100 percent.

According to the consolidated annual report in 2012, total assets of this company dropped from €12.049 billion to €9.446 billion, and the total company's equity dropped from €8.909 billion to €6.867 billion, with the negative net income of 108.51 million euros. In 2013, the company managed to become profitable for the second time since 2007, with annual net profit of €167.23 million. From 2013 to 2016, EPS has continued trend of posting positive annual net results. After years of posting positive net results, Elektroprivreda Srbije had negative net income of 11 million euros for 2018 calendar year.

== Subsidiaries ==
- EPS Trgovanje Ljubljana

== Major power plants ==
This is a list of major power plants operated by the Elektroprivreda Srbije (sorted by annual production in GWh, as of 2025):

Thermal power plants

- TPP "Nikola Tesla B" (Obrenovac, 7,179 GWh)
- TPP "Nikola Tesla A" (Obrenovac, 6,809 GWh)
- TPP "Kostolac" (A, B) (Kostolac, 6,024 GWh)
- TPP "Kolubara" (Lazarevac, 382 GWh)
- TE-TO Novi Sad (Novi Sad, 382 GWh)
- TPP "Morava" (Svilajnac, 260 GWh)

Hydro power plants

- HPP "Đerdap I" (Kladovo, 4,054 GWh)
- HPP "Đerdap II" (Kladovo, 1,377 GWh)
- HE "Bajina Bašta" (Bajina Bašta, 1,249 GWh)
- RHE "Bajina Bašta" (Bajina Bašta, 460 GWh)
- HE "Zvornik" (Mali Zvornik, 412 GWh)
- HE "Bistrica", HE "Kokin Brod" (Nova Varoš, 278 GWh)
- HE "Vlasinske" (Surdulica, 188 GWh)
- HE "Potpeć" (Priboj, 162 GWh)

== Allegations of corruption ==
In 2011 EPS was under the investigation by the police and the national anti-corruption body. Allegations were related to Kolubara (at the time, EPS's subsidiary) management which was found to be implicated in a number of different schemes involving equipment procurement and leasing and the sale of coal. In October 2011 authorities arrested 17 people, including two former directors of the Kolubara mine Dragan Tomic and Vladan Jovicic, eight executive managers and seven owners of private firms with which Kolubara conducted business. In April 2014 the Organized Crime Prosecutor has issued an official order for the police to look into the allegations about possible wrongdoings at the EPS. The allegations were based on the report of the Anti-Corruption Council which showed discrepancies in the quantities of electricity imported and exported by EPS from 2010 to 2012.

== See also ==
- Energy in Serbia
- List of power stations in Serbia
