= TPP Kostolac =

Coal-fired power plant in Serbia

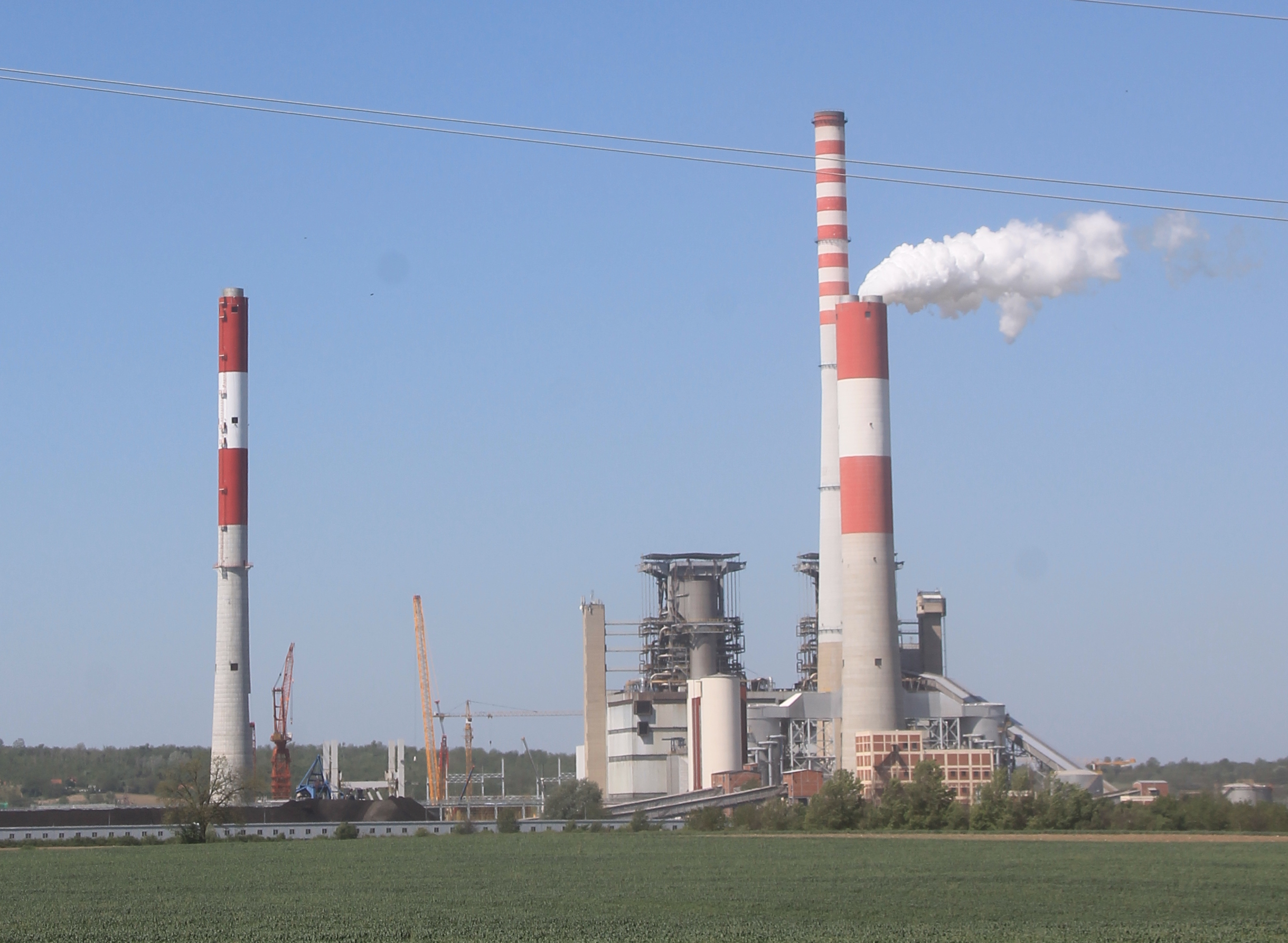
- View on TPP Kostolac, May 2021
- Country: Serbia
- Location: Kostolac, Požarevac
- Coordinates: 44°43′24″N 21°10′15″E
- Status: Operational
- Owner: Elektroprivreda Srbije (EPS)
- Operator: Elektroprivreda Srbije

Thermal power station
- Primary fuel: Coal

Power generation
- Units operational: 5
- Nameplate capacity: 1,222 MW (2025)
- Annual net output: 7.188 GWh (2025)

TPP Kostolac is a coal fired thermal power plant complex owned and operated by Elektroprivreda Srbije (EPS). It is located on the right bank of Danube river, in Kostolac, Požarevac. It is the second largest power plant in Serbia after TPP Nikola Tesla. Within the complex, there are 5 operational units, and has an installed capacity of 1,222 MW (as of 2025).

The power plant gets the majority of coal from nearby Drmno and Ćirikovac open cast mines (part of Kostolac coal basin). As the water cooling source, it uses the nearby river Danube. In addition to electric power, TPP "Kostolac A" produces heating energy for heating of Kostolac and Požarevac.

== History ==
In 1967, the first operational unit was commissioned. As of 2026, the power plant has a total of 5 operational units, grouped in "Kostolac A" and "Kostolac B". The "Kostolac A" consists of two units commissioned in 1967 and 1980, combined having the capacity of 281 MW.

The "Kostolac B" comprises two older units (B1 and B2) commissioned in 1987 and 1991, and the newest 350 MW, commissioned in 2024 – for a total of 941 MW.

In 2013, the project to build a new plant (Kostolac B3 unit) started. For the purposes of running the new plant, the expansion of the an open pit within the Kostolac coal basin from 9 to 12 tons of coal annually was planned.

On 20 November 2013, Elektroprivreda Srbije, "Tеrmoеlеktranе i kopovi" Kostolac and Chinese corporation CMEC signed an agreement on construction. Initially, the authorities announced that the construction of the power plant is expected to begin by the end of 2014 and to be finished by 2019. The total value of the project amounted to US$715.6 million (as of 2013). In December 2024, Kostolac B3 was commissioned.

== Ownership ==
The company "Tеrmoеlеktranе i kopovi" Kostolac is a subsidiary of Elektroprivreda Srbije which is 100% owned by the Government of Serbia.

== Controversy ==
=== Inadequate environmental impact assessment ===
The NGOs were of the opinion that the Environmental impact assessment for the TPP Kostolac B3 (newest operational unit) was inadequate since it excluded the expansion of the Kostolac coal basin open-cast (near Drmno), did not mention expected levels of emissions to air from heavy metals and did not consider alternative locations or alternative technologies. There was also no mentioning of transboundary impacts even though the site is just around 15 km from the Romanian border and even nearer to the river of Danube. The NGOs also stressed that data sources cited in the study for environmental and health information were outdated (from 2006) and very limited.

On 2 June 2014, the Serbian NGO CEKOR (Centre for Ecology and Sustainable Development) submitted a formal complaint in front of the Serbian national administrative court against the government’s decision to approve the Environmental Impact Assessment study for the construction of a new unit at the TPP Kostolac B. The complaint, in which the CEKOR exposes failings in the EIA process, was the first of its kind to reach Serbian courts.

=== Absence of the public procurement procedure ===
The signing of a contract with the Chinese CMEC on 20 November 2013 was done without public tender. This was justified by the Government of Serbia on the basis of Public procurement act, article 2, which says that projects signed under inter-state agreements with other states do not need tender processes. Given the fact that Serbia has the obligation of aligning itself with the EU legislation, the question arises if the law is in accordance with the EU public procurement and state aid legislation.

== Events ==
=== 2014 Floods ===
Floods in May 2014 threatened to reach Kostolac B thermo power plant, however plant workers, fire-fighters and civilian volunteers managed to contain the water by building embankments. Given the fact that during floods RB Kolubara suffered huge damages, losing Kostolac would mean another big hit for Serbia’s energy production. Environmental impact assessment for TPP Kostolac B3 doesn’t assess the vulnerability of the new power plant to flooding.

== See also ==
- Kostolac coal basin
- List of power stations in Serbia
