= Iron Gate III Hydroelectric Power Station =

Planned Serbian power station

Coordinates: 44°34′41″N 22°01′07″E

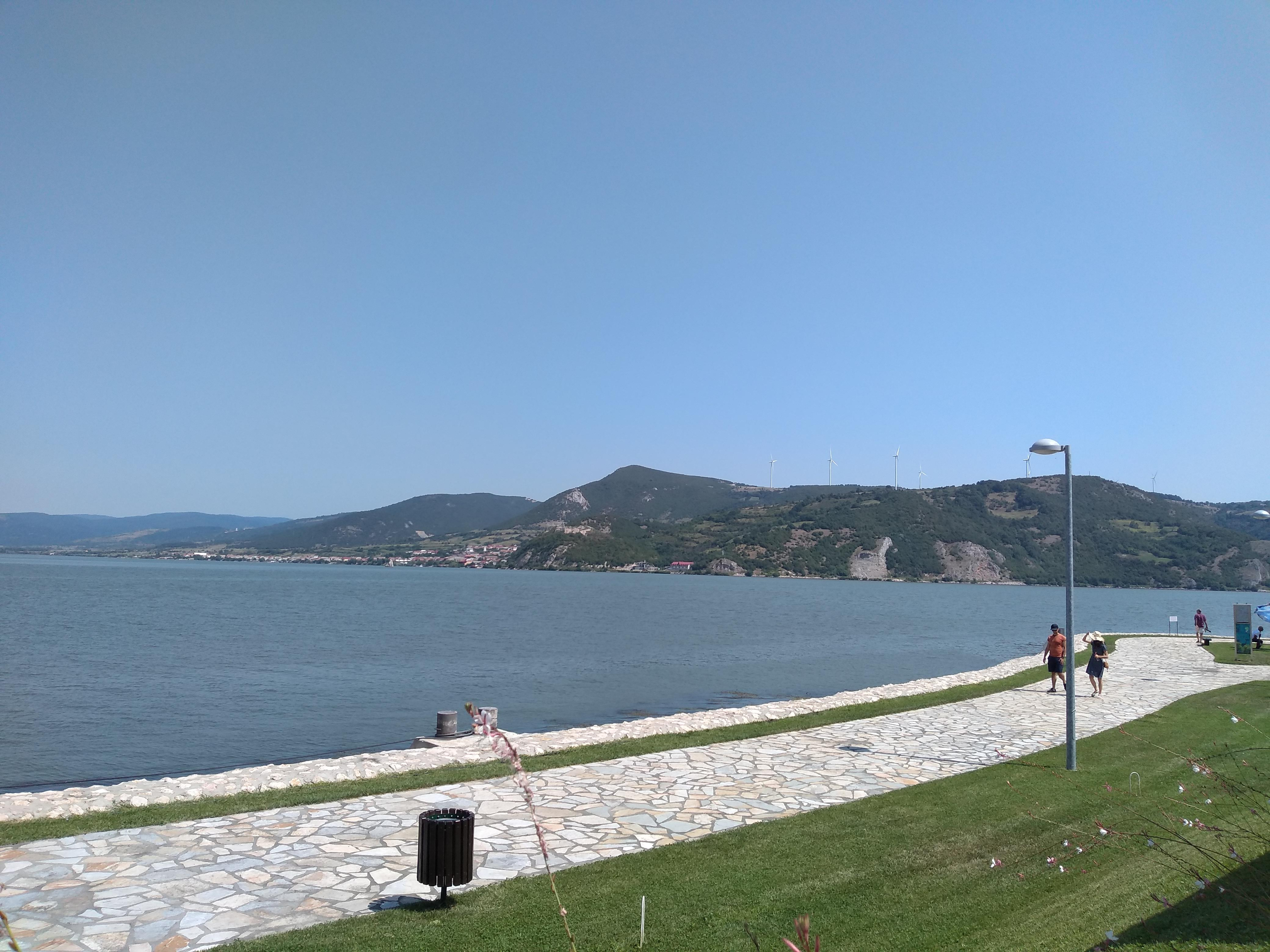
Widening of the Danube at Golubac, before it narrows in the direction of Dobra, the planned location of Đerdap III

Iron Gate III or Đerdap III (Serbian: Ђердап III) is a planned pumped storage power station on the Danube in Serbia, near the village of Dobra in the Golubac municipality. It would be the third Iron Gate power station, after Iron Gate I in 1972 and Iron Gate II in 1985. Unlike the first two, which were joint projects of Yugoslavia and Romania, the Iron Gate III would lie entirely on Serbian territory.

== Original project ==
Plans for the power station were drafted in 1977 by the Energoprojekt holding and Jaroslav Černi Institute. The village of Dobra, in the Golubac municipality, at the Danube's 1,007 kilometres (626 mi), was chosen as the construction site. Iron Gate III was planned as a pumped hydro station, which would pump water into several uphill reservoirs on the Brodica, Pesača and Železnički Potok localities. The tunnels were to lift water from an altitude of 68 metres (223 ft) (Danube level) up to 407 metres (1,335 ft) (uphill reservoirs). The reservoirs would also accept water from neighboring streams and collect a total of 587,000,000 cubic metres (2.07×10^{10} cu ft) of water. The reservoirs would be connected with tunnels, from 1.95 kilometres (1.21 mi) (Pesača-Vodostan) to 8.1 kilometres (5.0 mi) long (Brodica-Pesača). In total, after three phases of construction, the power plant would have a total installed capacity of 2,400 MW.

The studies were conducted into the 1980s, and the terrain was surveyed and measured, as it is made of karst. Apart from Yugoslavia and Romania, representatives of the electric companies from USSR and West Germany also participated in the surveys. Romania was to build a similar facility on its side of the river. Both states also planned additional power plants of 120 MW adjoining the third dams, which were to function only during high-water levels, accepting the water surplus. Besides the Iron Gate III dam, Yugoslavia also planned an additional pumped hydro plant "Bistrica II" (680 MW), built in the hills above the existing Bistrica power station on the Lim river, in Southwestern Serbia. If built at the time, the Iron Gate III and Bistrica plants would make 37% of Serbian electricity production capacity in 2021.

== Revival ==
In August 2021, both the Iron Gate III and Bistrica II projects were revived, with construction tentatively announced for 2022. The new hydro capacities would play a major role in Serbian transition to renewable energy sources, though the price was set to "several billion euros". Other projects were also announced, which experts consider more feasible due to the Iron Gate 3's high price and complex system. The Iron Gate III would exceed Serbian needs in electricity, so they proposed that project should be a regional and interstate one, also citing other priority projects to be finished first. The complex will be built in three phases, and when finished, it will produce 484 GWh of electricity per year. In September 2021, the U.S. company Bechtel expressed interest in building the dam, and a meeting between Bechtel's president Stu Jones, Serbian energy minister Zorana Mihajlović and US ambassador to Serbia Christopher R. Hill was held on 1 August 2022.

By the end of the year, the Serbian government allocated €1.5 billion in the 2022 budget for the construction of Iron Gate III, about half of the total projected costs. The government also stated that a foreign, strategic partner would be needed. It is expected to be either some Chinese company (as they were already participating in numerous major infrastructure projects), or a Russian one, as the Russians are already revitalizing the Iron Gate I dam. The construction is estimated to last for three to five years, in, now expanded four phases (I - 600 MW/2 billion KWh; II - 1.200 MW/3.1 billion MWh; III - 1.800 MW/5.2 billion KWh). After the final, phase IV, the total capacity will reach 2.400 MW with an annual production estimated to be approx. 7.6 billion KWh. The power plant would be operational only at night.

== See also ==
- Iron Gate I Hydroelectric Power Station
- Iron Gate II Hydroelectric Power Station
- List of power stations in Serbia
