= Gol Island =

Island in Romania

Coordinates: 44°39′29″N 22°33′04″E

Insula Golu
- Interactive map of Gol Island

Geography
- Location: Danube River
- Type: River Island
- Area: 0.04 km^{2} (0.015 sq mi)
- Length: 1,25 km (77.7 mi)
- Width: 0,25 km (15.5 mi)

Administration
- Romania

Gol Island (Romanian: Insula Golu) or Ban Island (Romanian: Insula Banului) is an island on the Danube River located near the settlement of Gura Vaji in Romania, near the "Đerdap I" hydroelectric power plant. The island has an area of 4 hectares.

== Geography ==
Gol is a Romanian island located near the Đerdap I hydroelectric power plant, 6 kilometers upstream from Kladovo. Across the island, on the Romanian side, is the settlement of Gura Vaji, and on the Serbian side is the village of Novi Sip. It covers an area of 4 hectares, with the largest width of the island being 250 meters. The island used to be larger because the construction of the Đerdap II hydroelectric power plant raised the level of the Danube, so part of the island was submerged. The island was formed due to the slowing down of the flow of the Danube when it exited the Đerdap Gorge, which led to the deposition of sediment near Novi Sip and the formation of a group of islands, of which there were at least four before, and after the construction of the hydroelectric power plant, only Gol remained.

== History ==
During the Roman Empire, a fortification was built on it to control the border and the waterway, and across the road on the right bank of the Danube was the Diana fortress. The fortress, in accordance with its location, was called Transdiana (Transdiana) and was located in the upstream part of the island. The fortress was used both in the Byzantine period and in the Middle Ages. The fortress has four towers, and in the southeast it was bordered by a deep ditch filled with Danube water. Before the construction of the hydroelectric power plant, archaeological research was carried out when the remains of settlements from the Old Stone Age, Neolithic and Early Iron Age were discovered. The importance of the Iron Age settlements is reflected in the fact that one of the types of Hallstatt culture is named after the island, Insula Banuluj, which is more often used in archaeological literature.

=== Archaeological Find ===
The archaeological site on the island is protected as a historical monument and includes the remains of a Hallstatt culture settlement (10th-9th century BC) as well as the remains of a Late Roman (4th century), Roman-Byzantine (4th-6th century) and medieval (14th-15th century) fortification.
