= Thermal Power Plant Morava =

Coal-fired power plant near Svilajnac, Serbia

- Country: Serbia
- Location: Svilajnac, Serbia
- Coordinates: 44°13′32″N 21°09′43″E
- Status: Operational
- Commission date: 1969; 57 years ago
- Owner: Elektroprivreda Srbije (EPS)
- Operator: Elektroprivreda Srbije

Thermal power station
- Primary fuel: Coal

Power generation
- Units operational: 1
- Nameplate capacity: 108 MW (2025)
- Annual net output: 260 GWh (2025)

Thermal Power Plant Morava, or TPP Morava, is a coal-fired power plant located near the town of Svilajnac, central Serbia. It is owned and operated by the Elektroprivreda Srbije (EPS), as part of its branch TPP Nikola Tesla.

The power plant began operating in 1969, and its generators have a nameplate capacity of 108 MW (as of 2025). It runs on lignite mined at Kolubara coal basin and underground mines of PEU Resavica. As the water cooling source, it uses the nearby river of Great Morava.

== History ==
The power plant was put into operation on 31 December 1968, but synchronized with the electrical system only a month later, on 31 January 1969.

== See also ==
- List of power stations in Serbia
