= EPS Surface Mining Kosovo =

Serbian coal surface mining company

- Native name: ЕПС Површински копови Косово
- Type: State-owned enterprise
- Industry: Coal mining (de jure)
- Founded: 21 December 1991; 34 years ago
- Headquarters: Obilić, Kosovo
- Area served: Kosovo; Serbia
- Key people: Srđa Kovačević (Director)
- Revenue: ▲€31.28 million (2022)
- Net income: ▼ (€1.38 million) (2022)
- Total assets: ▼€14.40 million (2022)
- Total equity: €0 (2022)
- Owner: Elektroprivreda Srbije (100%)
- Number of employees: 2,029 (2022)
- Parent: Elektroprivreda Srbije
- Website: www.eps.rs/eng/Pages/Ogranci.aspx
- Footnotes; Business ID: 09135103

EPS Surface Mining Kosovo (Serbian: ЕПС Површински копови Косово) is a Serbian coal surface mining company with headquarters in Obilić, Kosovo.

== History ==
EPS Surface Mining Kosovo was founded by Elektroprivreda Srbije (EPS) on 21 December 1991.

Following the Kosovo War and NATO bombing of Yugoslavia in 1999, the UNMIK administration was established in Kosovo on 1 July 1999, and Elektroprivreda Srbije lost its access to the local coal mines and power plants, including Kosovo A and Kosovo B power plants, which were under jurisdiction of EPS Surface Mining Kosovo.

Since then, government-owned Elektroprivreda Srbija by political decision continued to pay off earnings to all of Kosovo-based EPS companies, including EPS Surface Mining Kosovo employees (the other two EPS companies based on Kosovo are EPS TPP Kosovo and EPS Elektrokosmet). However, all these employees are not working in Kosovo-based power plants, and are only occasionally and indirectly employed by EPS throughout the rest of Serbia. As of May 2009, there was a total of around 7,000 such employees which were working only on paper and receive regular earnings. As of June 2017, that number was cut to 4,539 employees. As of August 2022, a total of 3,300 employees worked for these three companies.

== See also ==
- Elektroprivreda Srbije
- EPS TPP Kosovo
- EPS Elektrokosmet
- Electrical energy in Kosovo
