= EPS Elektrokosmet =

Serbian state-owned transmission system operator

- Native name: ЕПС Електрокосмет
- Type: State-owned enterprise
- Industry: Electric utility (de jure)
- Founded: 27 December 1989; 36 years ago
- Founder: Elektroprivreda Srbije
- Successor: Elektrosever
- Headquarters: Pristina, Kosovo
- Area served: Kosovo; Serbia
- Key people: Boban Novaković (Director)
- Revenue: ▲€9.30 million (2022)
- Net income: ▲ (€9.55 million) (2022)
- Total assets: ▼€100.86 million (2022)
- Total equity: €0 (2022)
- Owner: Elektroprivreda Srbije (100%)
- Number of employees: 457 (2022)
- Parent: Elektroprivreda Srbije
- Website: www.eps.rs/eng/Pages/Ogranci.aspx
- Footnotes; Business ID: 09016473

EPS Elektrokosmet (Serbian: ЕПС Електрокосмет) is a Serbian state-owned transmission system operator company for electricity with the headquarters in Pristina, Kosovo. It is specialized in the transmission of electrical power.

== History ==
EPS Elektrokosmet was founded by Elektroprivreda Srbije (EPS) on 27 December 1989.

Following the Kosovo War and NATO bombing of Yugoslavia in 1999, the UNMIK administration was established in Kosovo on 1 July 1999, and Elektroprivreda Srbije lost its access to the local coal mines and power plants, including Kosovo A and Kosovo B power plants, which were under jurisdiction of EPS Elektrokosmet.

Since then, government-owned Elektroprivreda Srbija by political decision continued to pay off earnings to all of Kosovo-based EPS companies, including EPS Elektrokosmet employees (the other two EPS companies based on Kosovo are EPS Surface Mining Kosovo and EPS TPP Kosovo). However, all these employees are not working in Kosovo-based power plants, and are only occasionally and indirectly employed by EPS throughout the rest of Serbia. As of May 2009, there was a total of around 7,000 such employees which were working only on paper and receive regular earnings. As of June 2017, that number was cut to 4,539 employees. As of August 2022, a total of 3,300 employees worked for these three companies.

On 24 June 2022, the Energy Regulatory Office gave Elektosever the right to distribute electricity to the four municipalities in North Kosovo, which means Elektosever replaces EPS Elektrokosmet. However, EPS Elektrokosmet still exists and has not closed its operations.

== See also ==
- Elektroprivreda Srbije
- EPS Surface Mining Kosovo
- EPS TPP Kosovo
- Electrical energy in Kosovo
