= List of power stations in Serbia =

Location of power stations in Serbia: coal/oil/gas, hydroelectric

The following page lists all power stations in Serbia.

== Thermal ==
=== Coal ===
The total generating capacity is 4,390 MW (excluding Kosovo A and Kosovo B power plants). With the establishment of the UNMIK administration in Kosovo on 1 July 1999, Serbia lost access to the local coal mines and power plants, including Kosovo A and Kosovo B power plants.

Station	Location	Coordinates	Capacity (MW)
TE Kolubara	Lazarevac	44.480°N 20.294°E	225
TE Kostolac A	Kostolac	44.723°N 21.172°E	310
TE Kostolac B	Drmno	44.730°N 21.210°E	700
TE Morava	Svilajnac	44.223°N 21.163°E	100
TE Nikola Tesla A	Obrenovac	44.671°N 20.159°E	1,560
TE Nikola Tesla B	Obrenovac	44.654°N 20.001°E	1,220
TE Kosovo A	Priština	42.676°N 21.085°E	~~617~~
TE Kosovo B	Priština	42.693°N 21.056°E	618

=== Natural gas ===
The total generating capacity is 336 MW.

Station	Location	Coordinates	Electric capacity (MW)	District heat capacity (MW)
Panonske TE-TO	Novi Sad Zrenjanin Sremska Mitrovica	45.267°N 19.884°E	297	505

== Hydro power plants ==
The total generating capacity is 2,936 MW.

Station	Location	Geographical coordinates	Capacity (MW)
HE Uvac	Uvac	43.419°N 19.931°E	36
HE Kokin Brod	Nova Varoš	43.517°N 19.811°E	22
HE Bistrica	Priboj	43.519°N 19.593°E	102
HE Potpeć	Priboj	43.522°N 19.576°E	51
HE Bajina Bašta	Bajina Bašta	43.963°N 19.409°E	420
RHE Bajina Bašta pumped storage	Bajina Bašta	43.963°N 19.409°E	614
HE Zvornik	Mali Zvornik	44.368°N 19.107°E	125.6
Đerdap I	Kladovo	44.670°N 22.529°E	1,080
Đerdap II	Kladovo	44.306°N 22.566°E	270
HE Vlasina	Surdulica	42.708°N 22.070°E	129
HE Pirot	Pirot	43.155°N 22.610°E	80
HE Međuvršje	Međuvršje	43.909°N 20.232°E	9
HE Ovčar Banja	Ovčar Banja	43.899°N 20.180°E	8

== Wind power plants ==
The total installed capacity is 604.1MW.

Station	Location	Capacity (MW)
Đevreč	Tutin	0.5
Kula	Kula	9.9
La Pikolina	Zagajica	6.6
Malibunar	Alibunar	8
Košava	Vršac	68
Čibuk	Kovin	157
Alibunar	Alibunar	42
Kovačica	Kovačica	104.5
Plandište 1	Plandište	102
Krivača	Golubac	105.6

== See also ==
- List of power stations in Europe
- List of largest power stations in the world
