= Kostolac coal basin =

Open-pit coal basin in Serbia

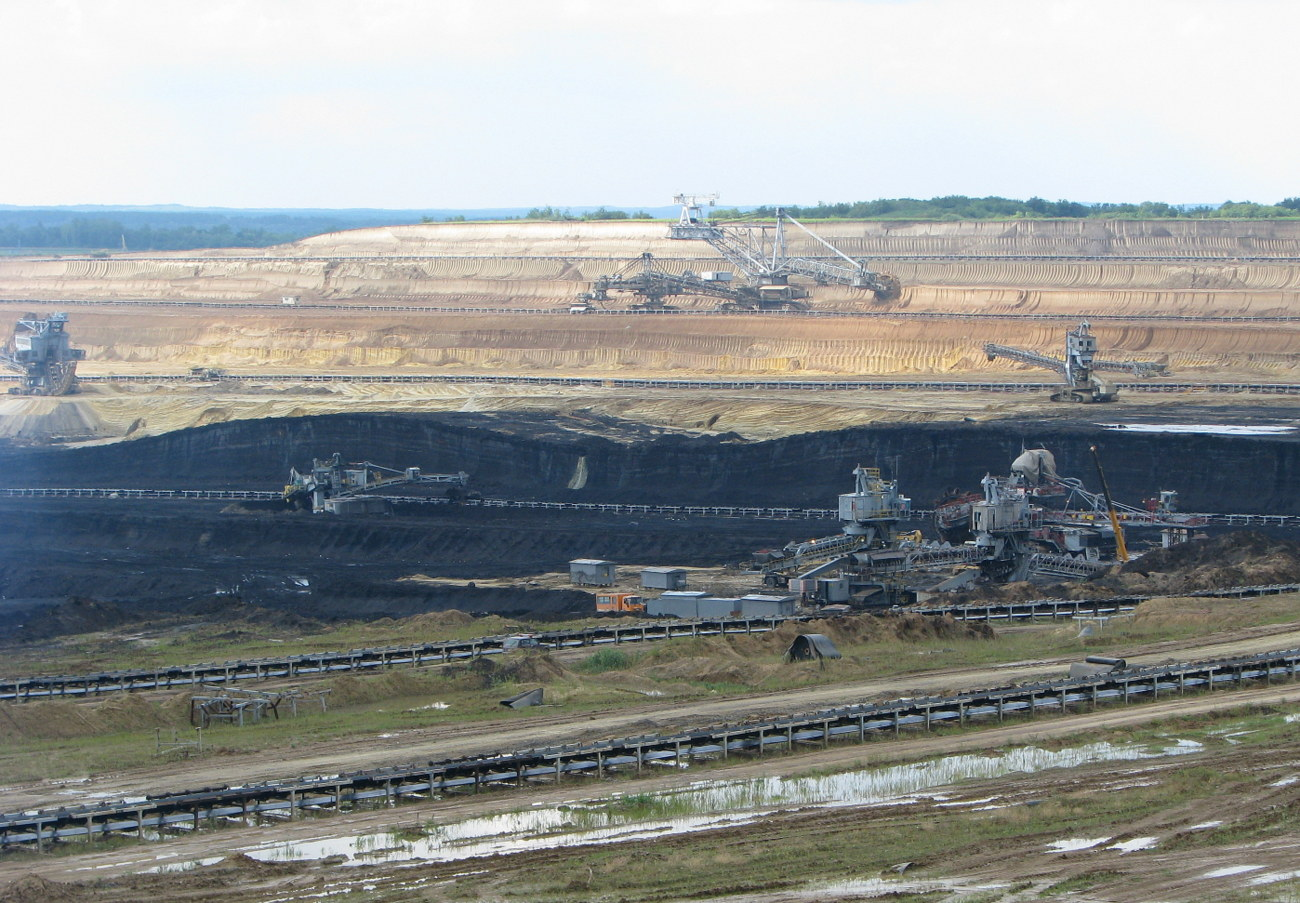
- View on Kostolac coal basin near the village of Drmno

- Location within Serbia
- Location: Kostolac, Serbia; 44°43′40″N 21°12′47″E
- Products: Lignite
- Production: 10.2 million tonnes of coal (2025)
- Company: Elektroprivreda Srbije (EPS)
- Website: www.eps.rs/eng/poslovanje-ugalj/Pages/Kopovi.aspx

The Kostolac coal basin is a coal mining basin owned and operated by Elektroprivreda Srbije (EPS). It is located near the town of Kostolac, Serbia. The basin has coal reserves amounting to 809 million tonnes of lignite, one of the largest lignite reserves in Europe, and it produces 10.2 million tonnes of coal per year (as of 2025). The nearby thermal power plant TPP Kostolac uses its coal to produce the electricity.

== See also ==
- TPP Kostolac
