= Thermal Power Plant Kolubara =

Coal-fired power plant in Serbia

TPP Kolubara
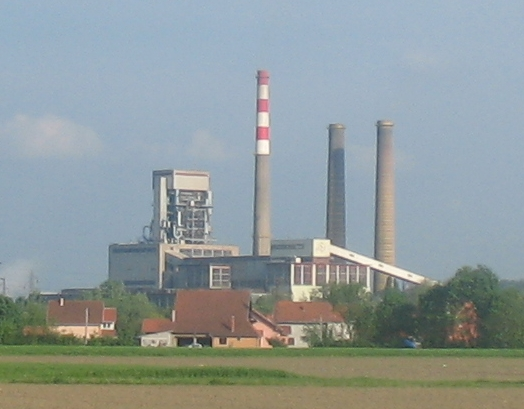
- TPP Kolubara as seen in the distance, May 2011
- Country: Serbia
- Location: Veliki Crljeni, Lazarevac, Belgrade
- Coordinates: 44°28′50″N 20°17′38″E
- Status: Operational
- Owner: Elektroprivreda Srbije (EPS)
- Operator: Elektroprivreda Srbije

Thermal power station
- Primary fuel: Coal

Power generation
- Nameplate capacity: 216 MW (2025)
- Annual net output: 382 GWh (2025)

Thermal power plant Kolubara, or shortly TPP Kolubara, is a coal-fired power plant located near the village of Veliki Crljeni, Lazarevac, central Serbia. It is owned and operated by the Elektroprivreda Srbije (EPS), as part of its branch TPP Nikola Tesla. It began operating in 1956, and its generators have a nameplate capacity of 216 MW (as of 2025).

The power plant runs on lignite which is mined in the nearby Kolubara coal basin and delivered to it via railway. As the water cooling source, it uses the nearby river of Kolubara.

== See also ==
- List of power stations in Serbia
