= Elektrodistribucija Srbije =

Serbian electric power distribution company

- Trade name: Електродистрибуција Србије
- Native name: sr
- Industry: Electric utility
- Predecessor: EPS Distribucija (2015–2021)
- Headquarters: Belgrade, Serbia
- Area served: Serbia
- Key people: Biljana Komnenić (Director)
- Services: Electric power distribution
- Revenue: €916.06 million (2024)
- Net income: (€59.25 million) (2024)
- Total assets: €3.405 billion (2024)
- Total equity: €2.303 billion (2024)
- Owner: Government of Serbia (100%)
- Number of employees: 8,552 (2024)
- Website: elektrodistribucija.rs

Elektrodistribucija Srbije (Serbian Cyrillic: Електродистрибуција Србије; abbr. ED) is a Serbian state-owned electric power distribution company. It is headquartered in Belgrade, Serbia.

== History ==
The company was founded on 31 December 1991, as Elektrodistribucija Beograd, operating as electricity distribution company for the region of Belgrade; similar companies existed for other regions in Serbia. In 2005, these companies were integrated into Elektroprivreda Srbije (EPS), and operated within it in that form until 2015. In 2015, EPS formed a separate entity (under its ownership) named EPS Distribucija, which provided electricity distribution for the whole territory of Serbia.

In June 2021, EPS Distribucija was separated from Elektroprivreda Srbije (EPS) and operated under direct government ownership, changing the name to Elektrodistribucija Srbije.

== See also ==
- Electricity distribution companies by country
