= Iron Gate I Hydroelectric Power Station =

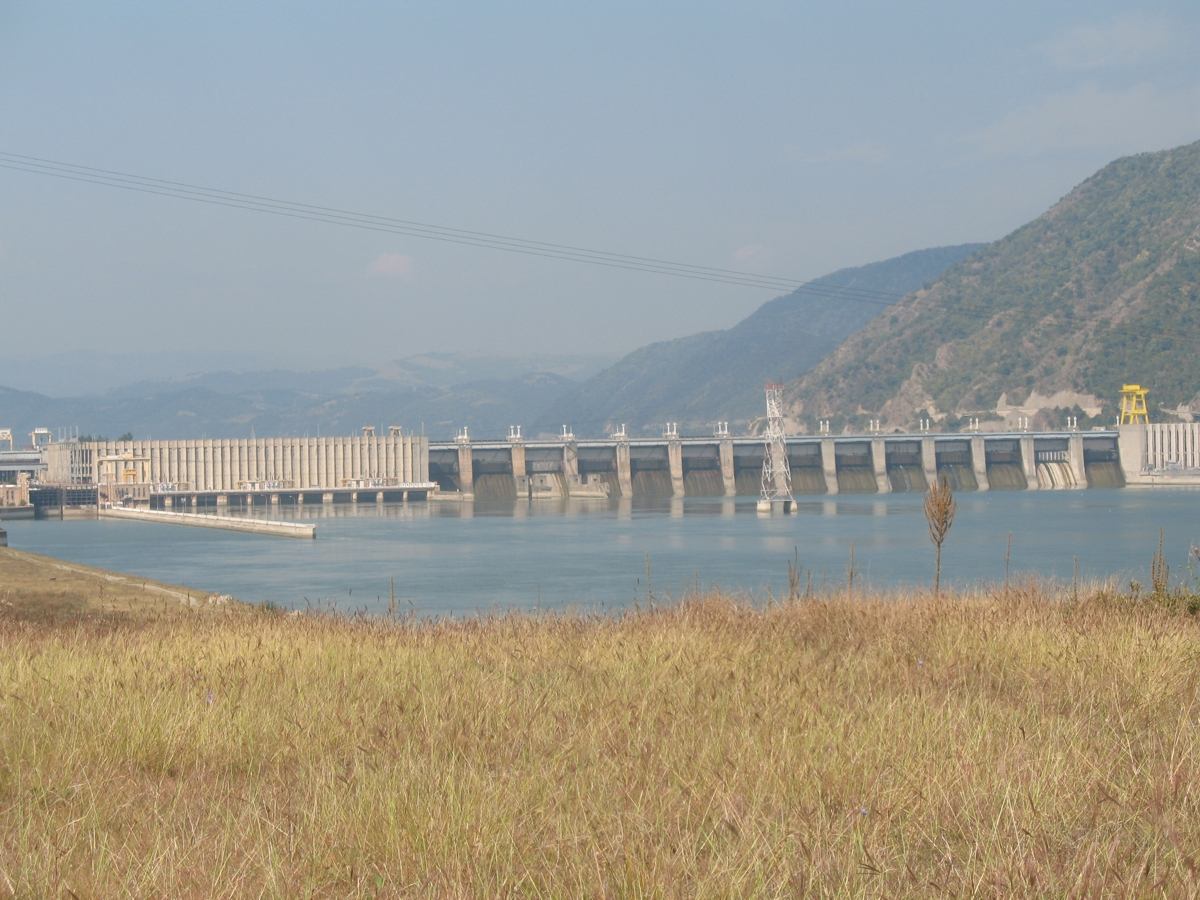
- Iron Gates seen from Kladovo

- Location within Serbia Location within Romania
- Interactive map of Iron Gate I Hydroelectric Power Station
- Location: Iron Gate; Serbia; Romania
- Coordinates: 44°40′15″N 22°31′45″E
- Construction began: 7 September 1964
- Opening date: 16 May 1972

Dam and spillways
- Impounds: Danube River
- Height: 60 m (200 ft)
- Length: 1,278 m (4,193 ft)

Reservoir
- Creates: Iron Gate I Reservoir
- Total capacity: 2.1 km^{3} (0.50 mi^{3})
- Catchment area: 577,250 km^{2} (222,880 mi^{2})
- Surface area: 104.41 km^{2} (40.31 mi^{2})

Power Station
- Turbines: Romania: 6 × 194.3 MW; Serbia: 6 × 201 MW
- Installed capacity: 2,371.8 MW
- Annual generation: Romania: 5.24 TWh; Serbia: 5.65 TWh

The Iron Gate I Hydroelectric Power Station (Romanian: Porțile de Fier I, Serbian: Ђердап I/Đerdap I) is the largest dam on the Danube river and one of the largest hydro power plants in Europe. It is located on the Iron Gate gorge, between Romania and Serbia.

The Romanian side of the power station produces approximately 5.24 TWh annually, while the Serbian side of the power station produces 5.65 TWh.

== History ==
The project started in 1964 as a joint-venture between the governments of Romania and Yugoslavia for the construction of a major dam on the Danube River which would serve both countries. At the time of completion in 1972, it was the 10th largest hydroelectric power stations in the world with twelve Kaplan turbines generating 2,052 MW, divided equally between the two countries at 1,026 MW each.

The small inhabited island of Ada Kaleh was submerged during the construction.

=== Modernization ===
As the original turbines' 30 years lifespan came to an end, in 1998 the Romanian half of the dam started a program of modernization. As part of this program, the first of the turbines was stopped in 1999. By 2007 the program was completed and the Romanian half of the dam's operations were back to full capacity. The nominal capacity of each of the six units was increased from 171 MW to 194.3 MW, thus giving an installed capacity of 1,165.8 MW, increasing the entire power generation capacity of the dam to 2,192 MW at the time. On the Serbian part of the dam, modernization started in July 2008; modernising units 4 to 6. Modernisation was finished in December 2023. The nominal capacity of each of the six units was increased from 174 MW to 201 MW. The units were upgraded with the help of the Russian company Power Machines from Saint Petersburg, as well as subcontractors and eleven domestic companies.

In addition to the upgrades, the Serbian side is planning to build a new, smaller power station, called Iron Gate III (Serbian: Ђердап III/Đerdap III).

=== Gallery ===
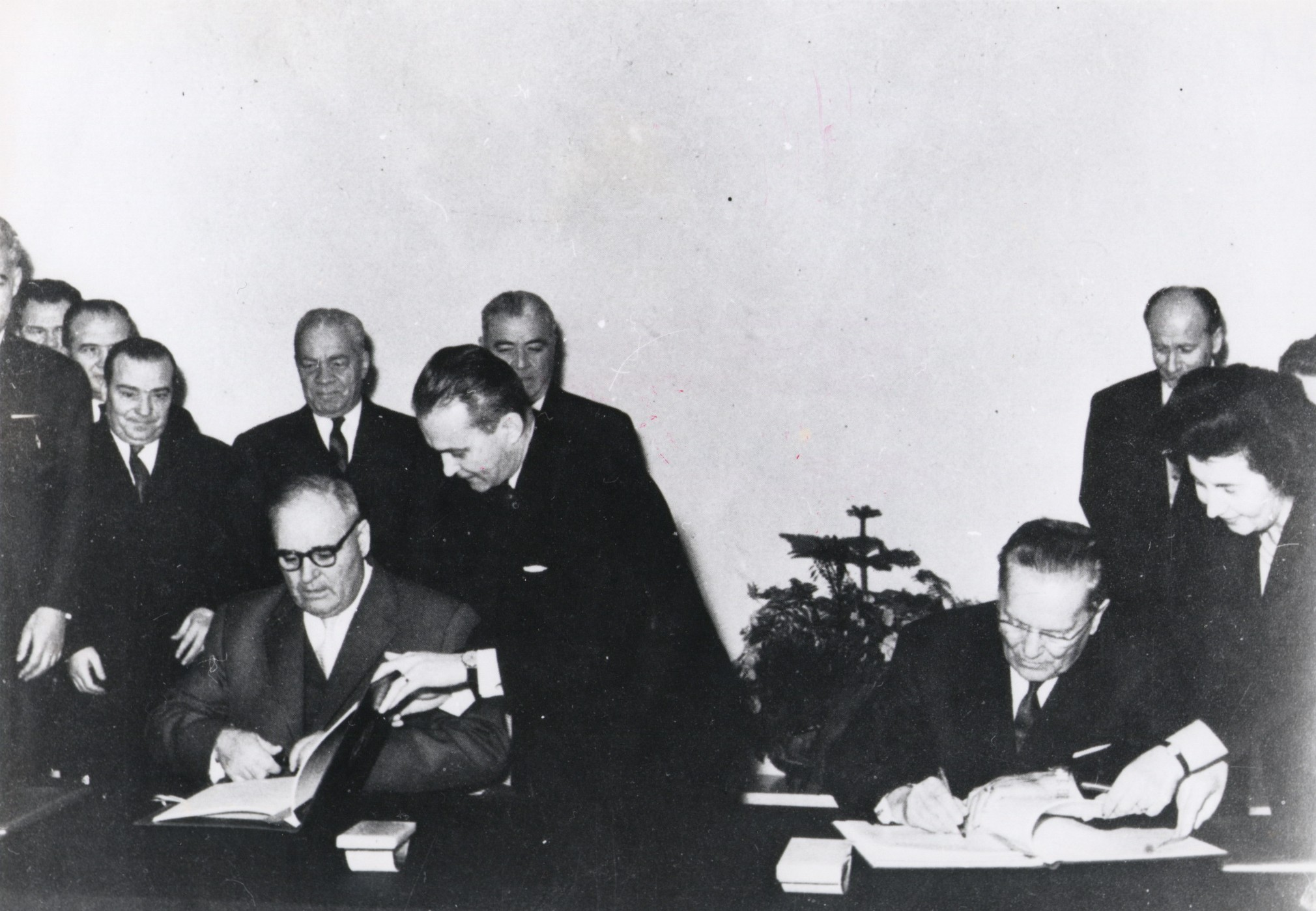
Gheorghe Gheorghiu-Dej and Josip Broz Tito signing the treaty that allowed for the construction process to begin, 30 November 1963

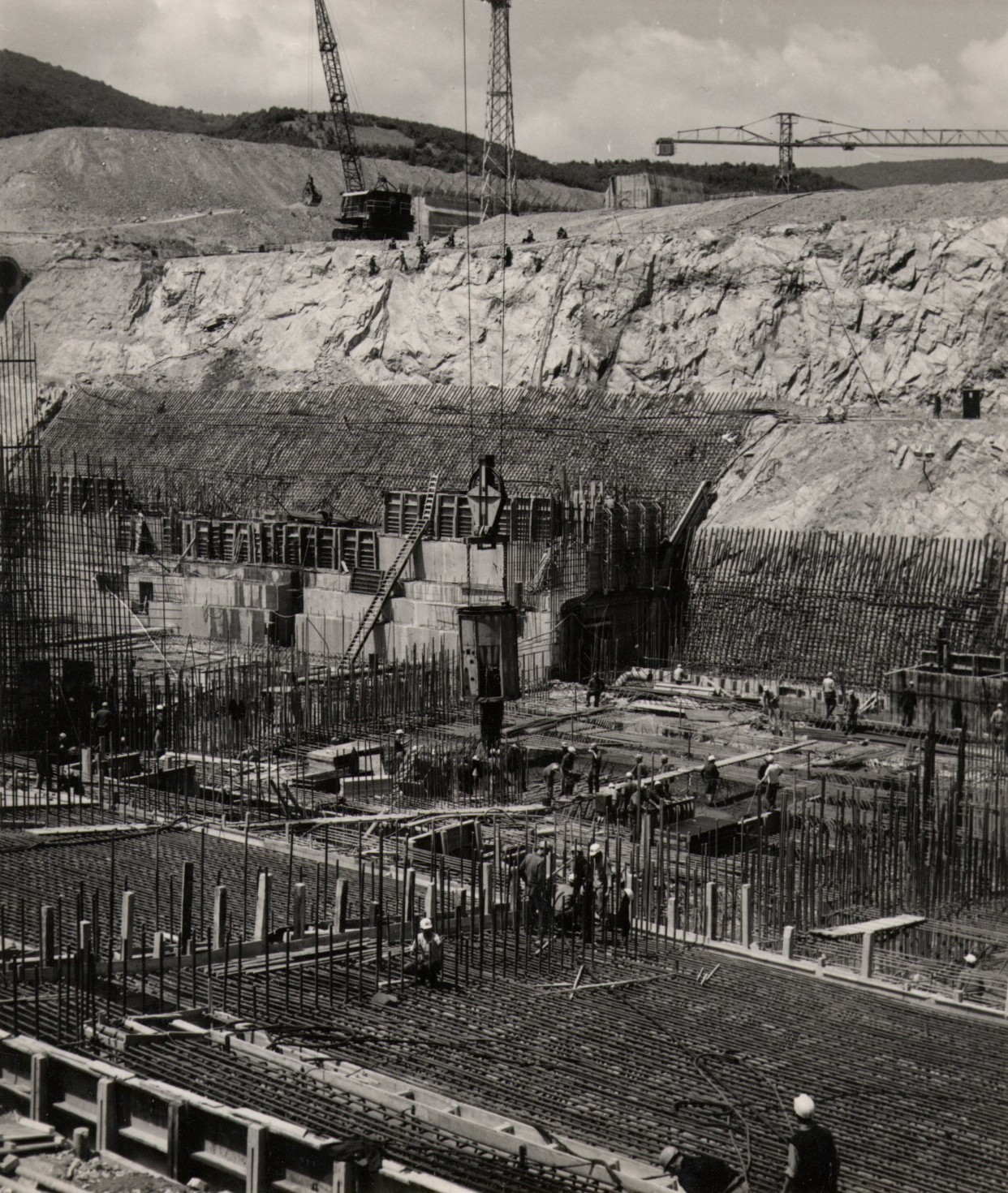
Foundations being laid on the Yugoslav side

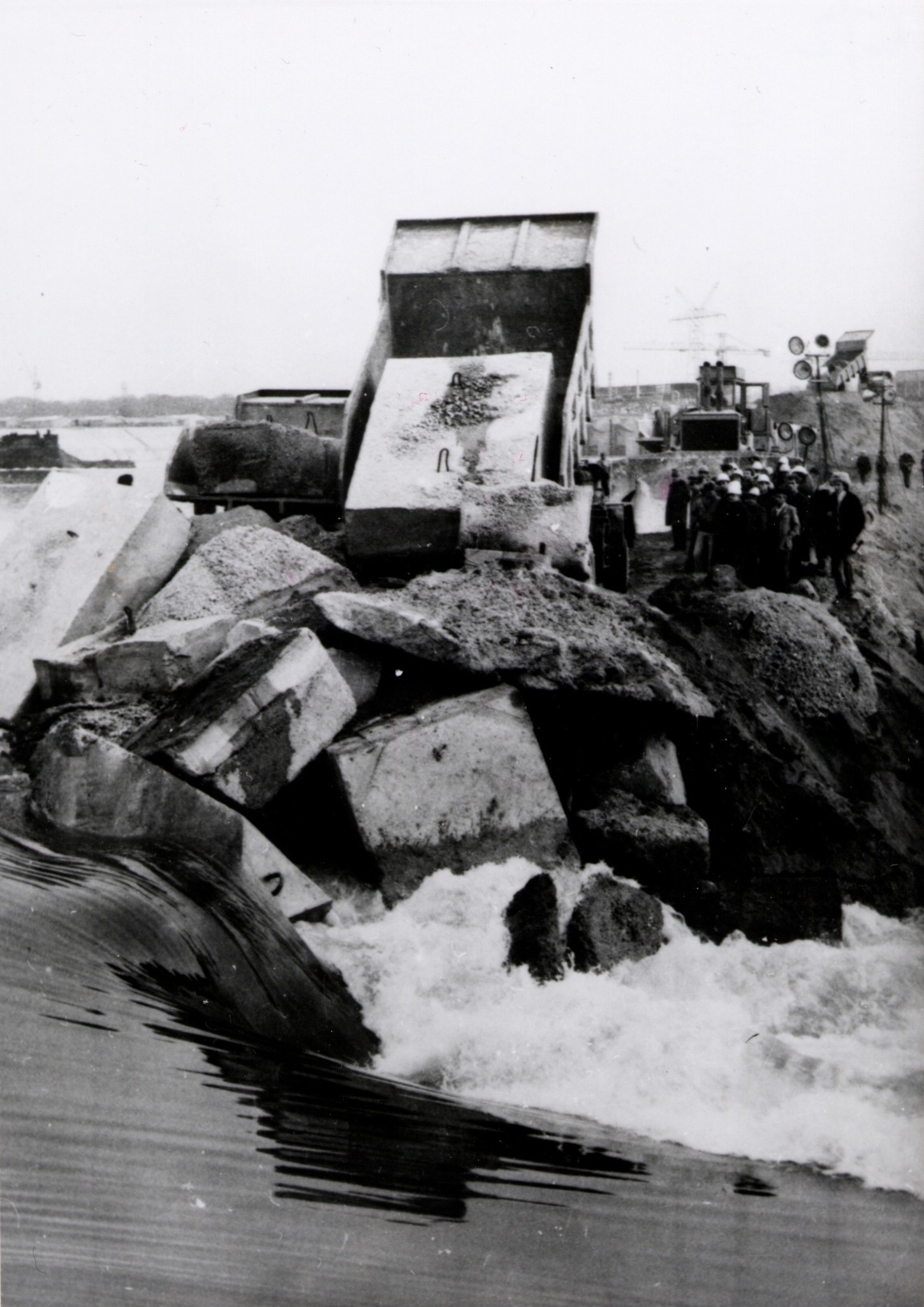
Concrete slabs being thrown into the Danube to temporarily redirect the flow of water

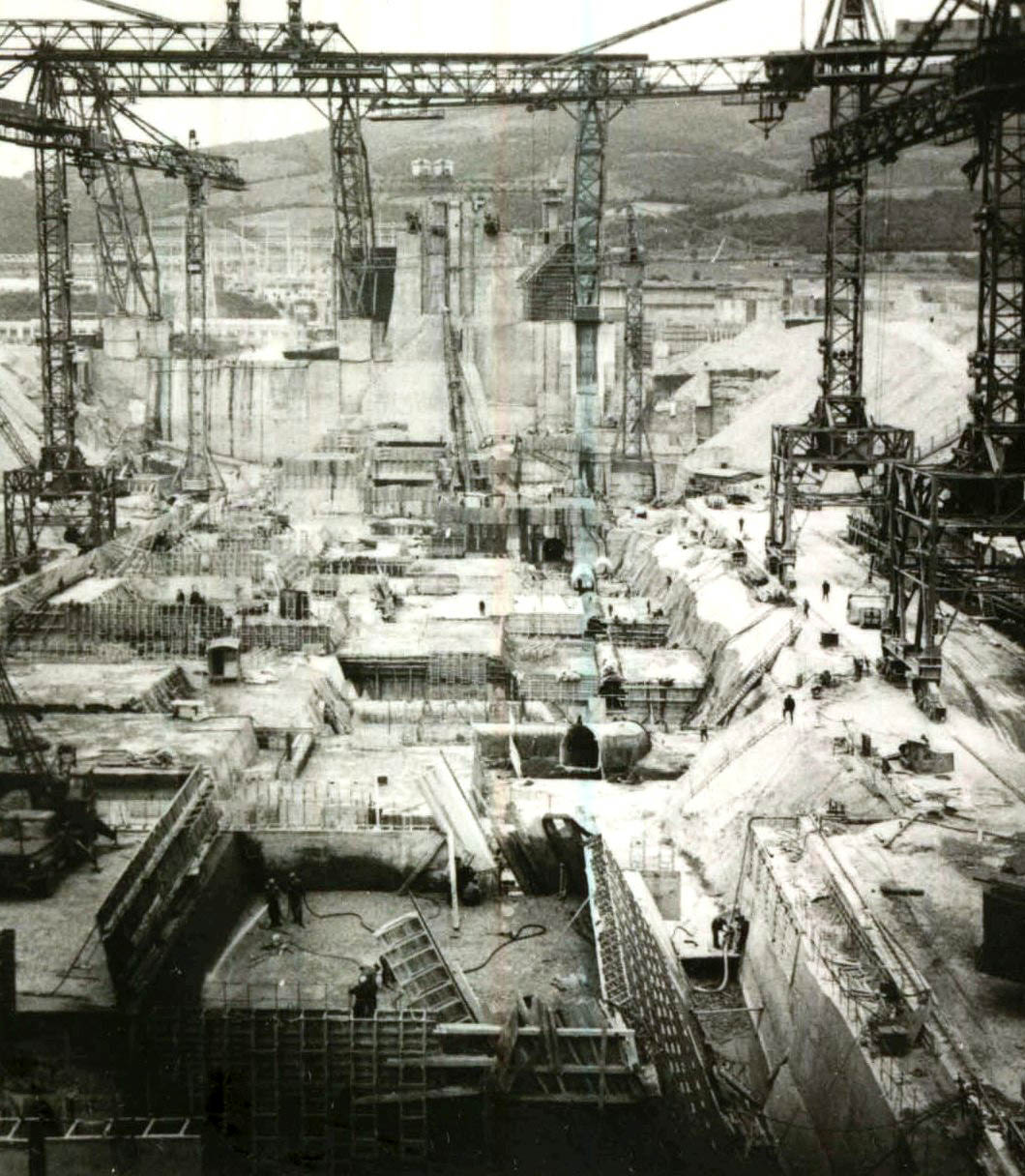
Foundations being built on the Romanian side

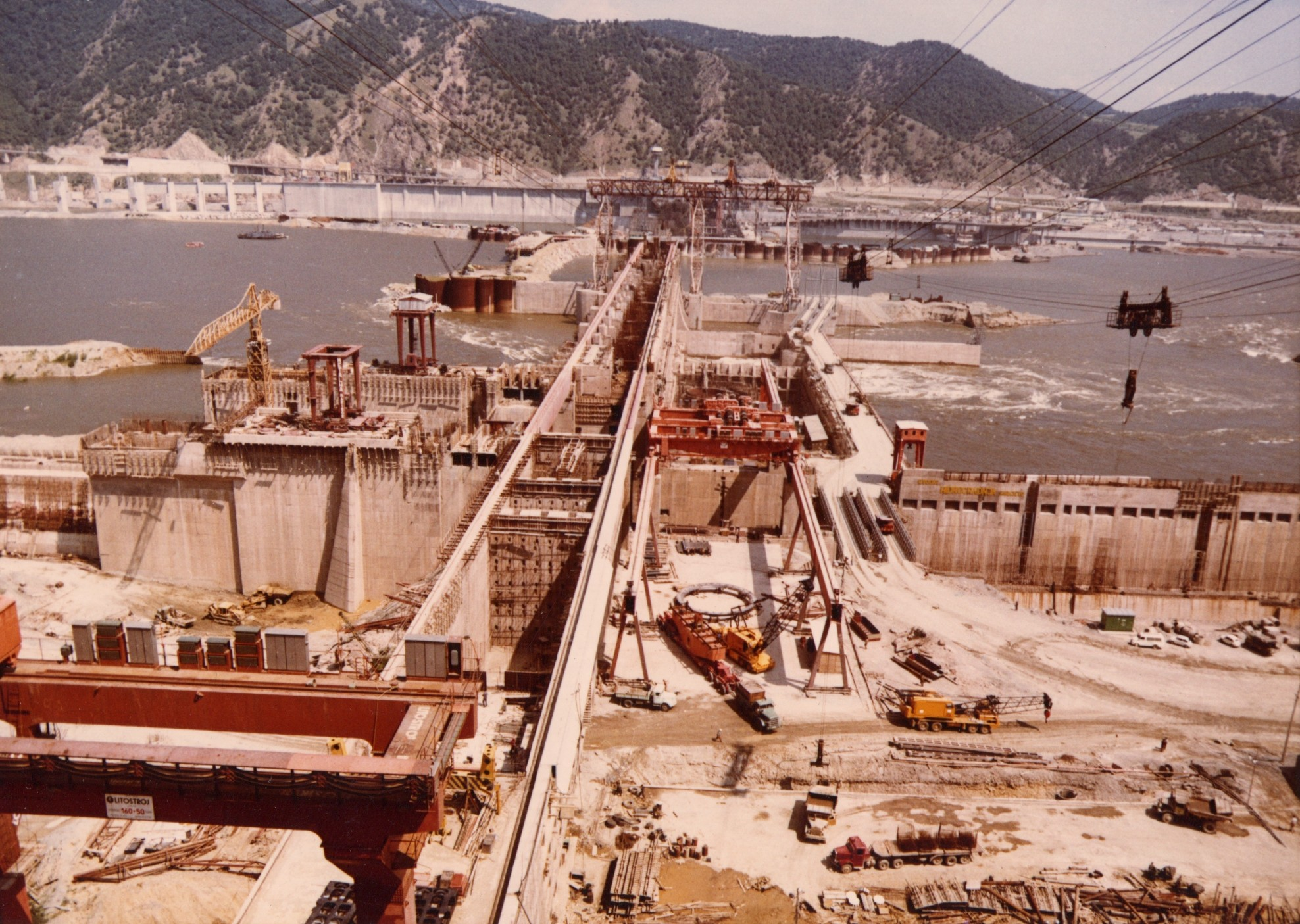
Overview of the construction site from Davidovac on the Yugoslavian side towards Gura Văii on the Romanian site, the viaducts of the new DN6 trunk road and of the Craiova-Caransebeș railway are also seen under construction on the Romanian side

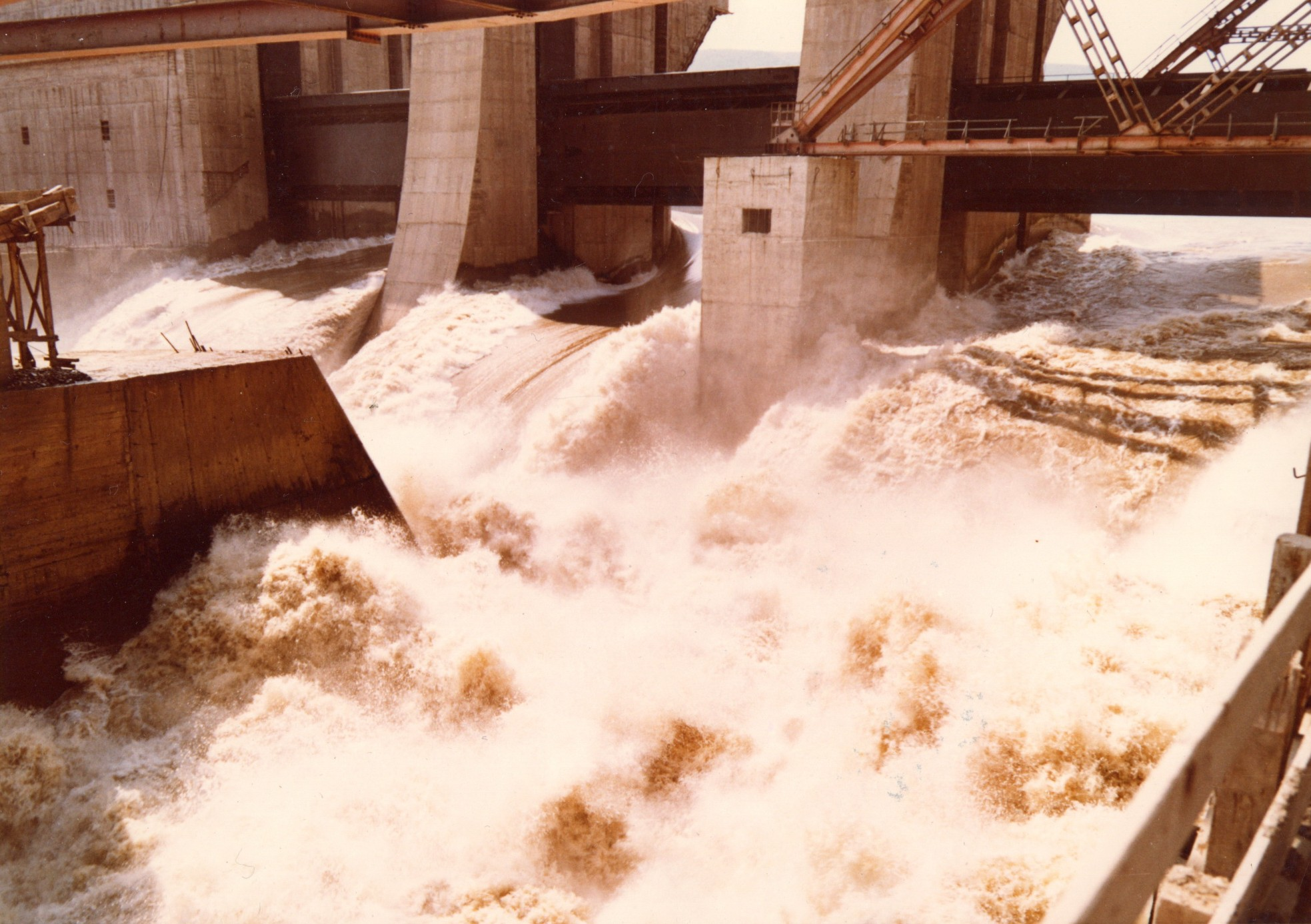
Opened floodgates during construction

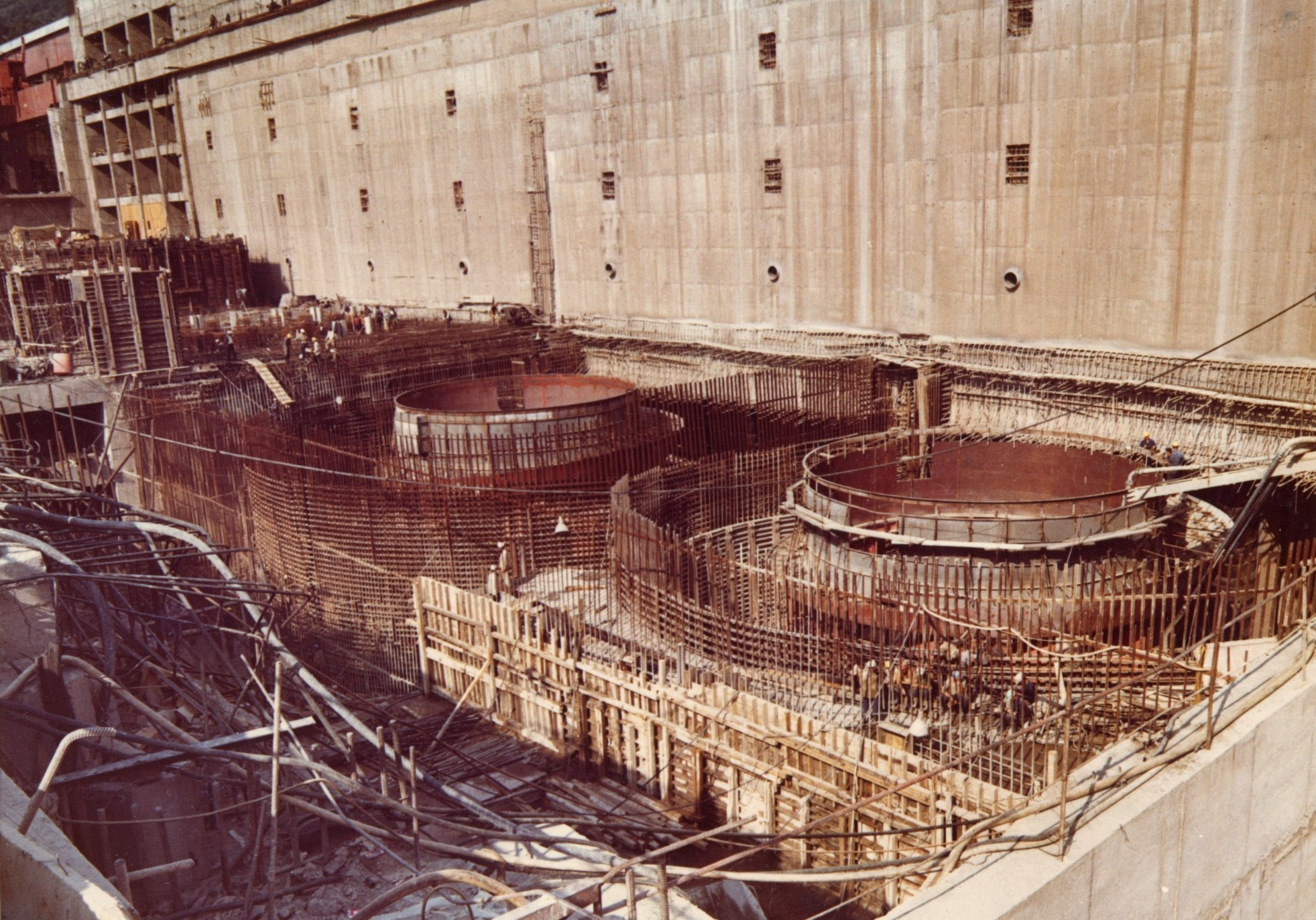
The foundations for the turbine and aggregates on the Romanian side

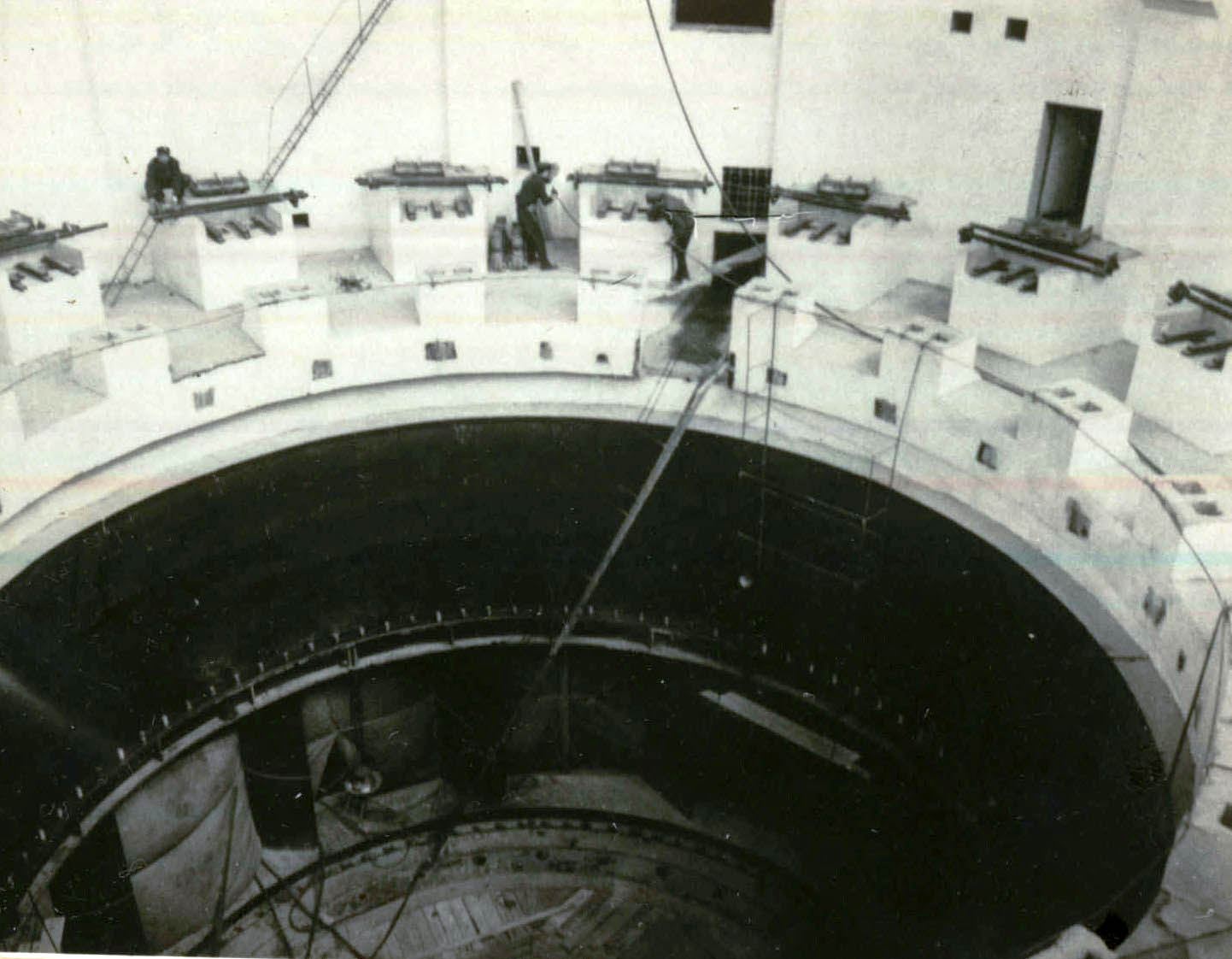
Engineers working on the turbine shaft on the Romanian side

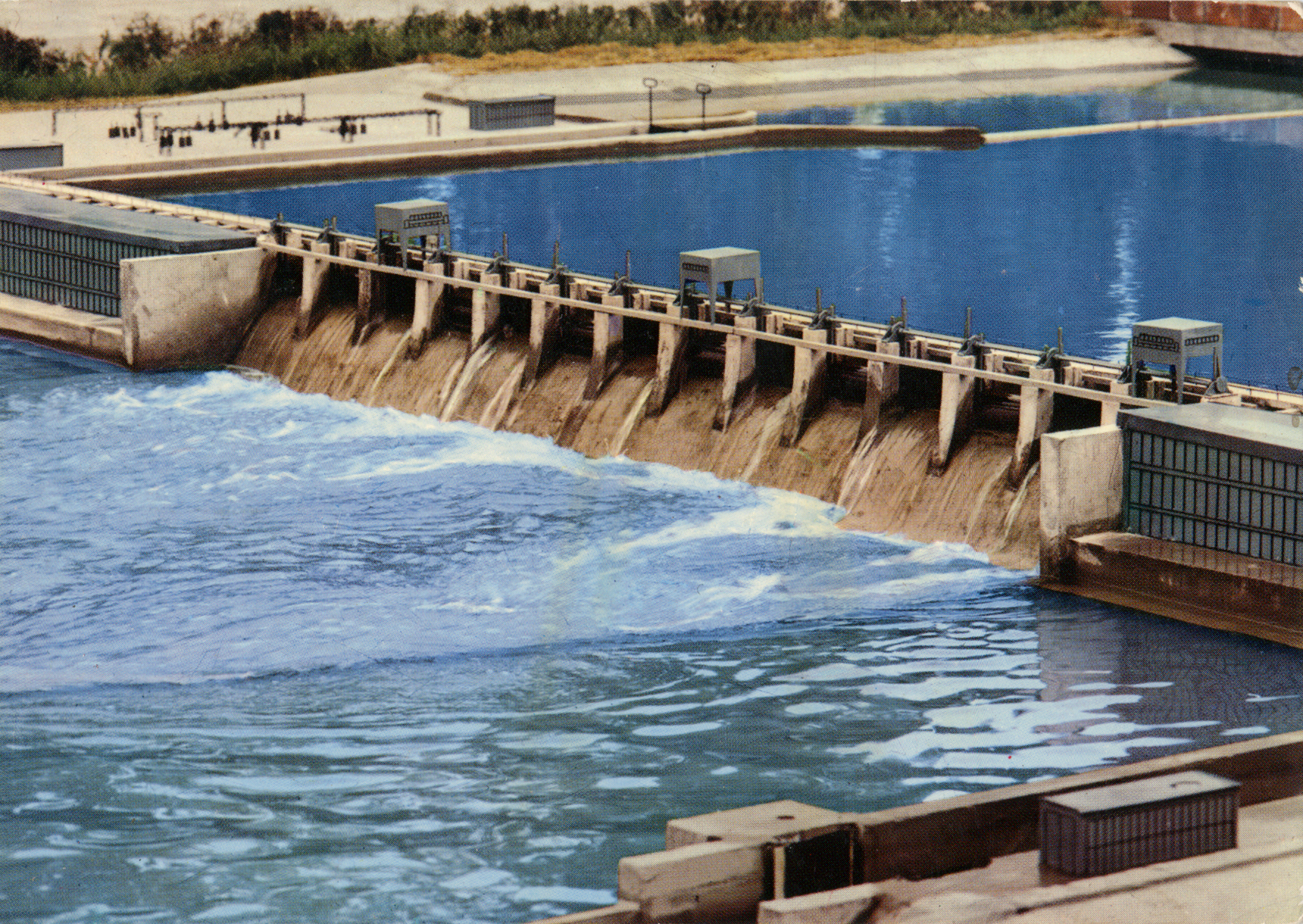
Model of the power station made in Belgrade

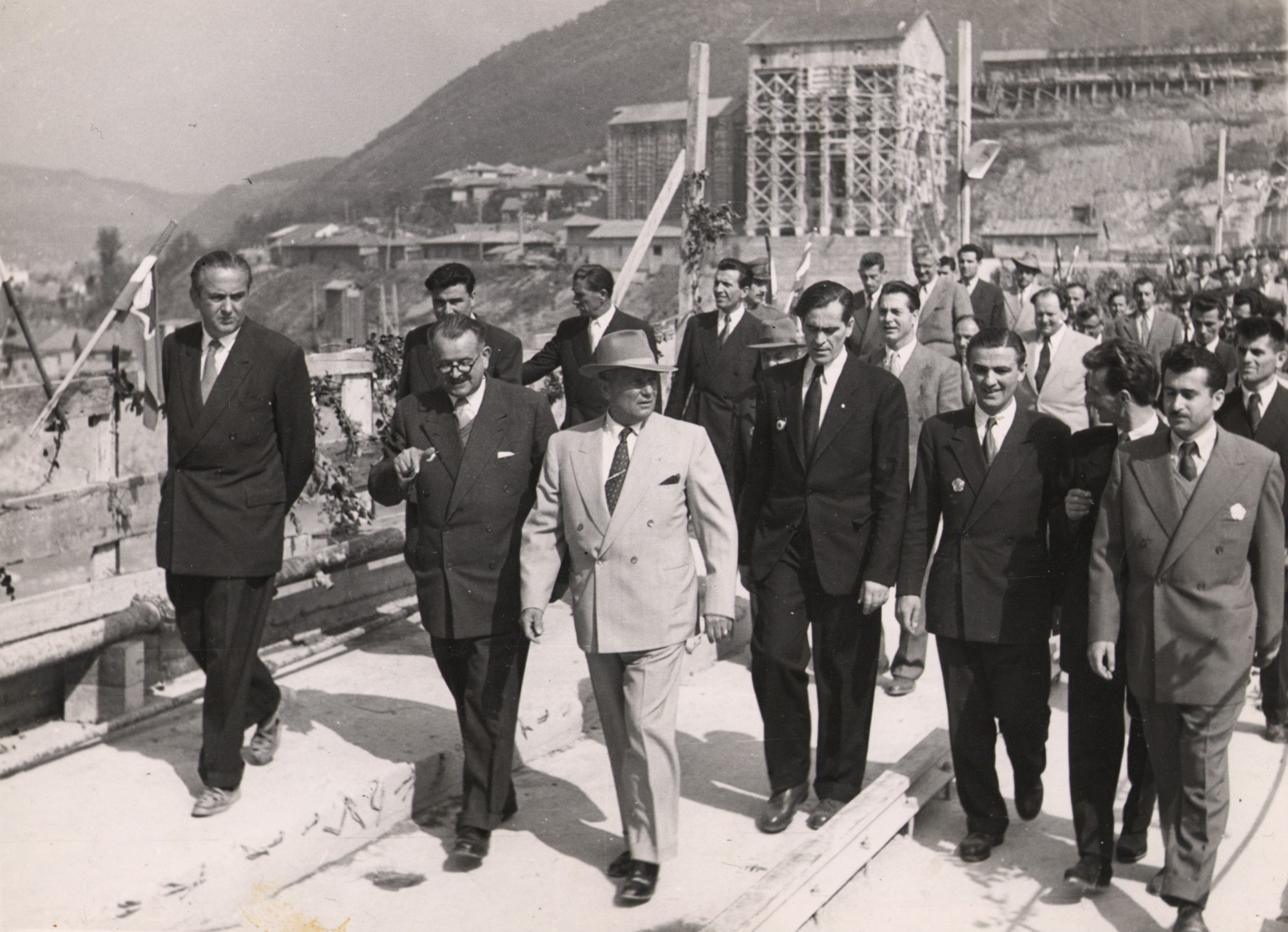
Josip Broz Tito on the opening day, 16 May 1972

== See also ==
- Iron Gate II Hydroelectric Power Station
- Iron Gate III Hydroelectric Power Station
- List of conventional hydroelectric power stations
- List of power stations in Romania
- List of power stations in Serbia
- Energy in Romania
- Energy in Serbia
