= Iron Gate II Hydroelectric Power Station =

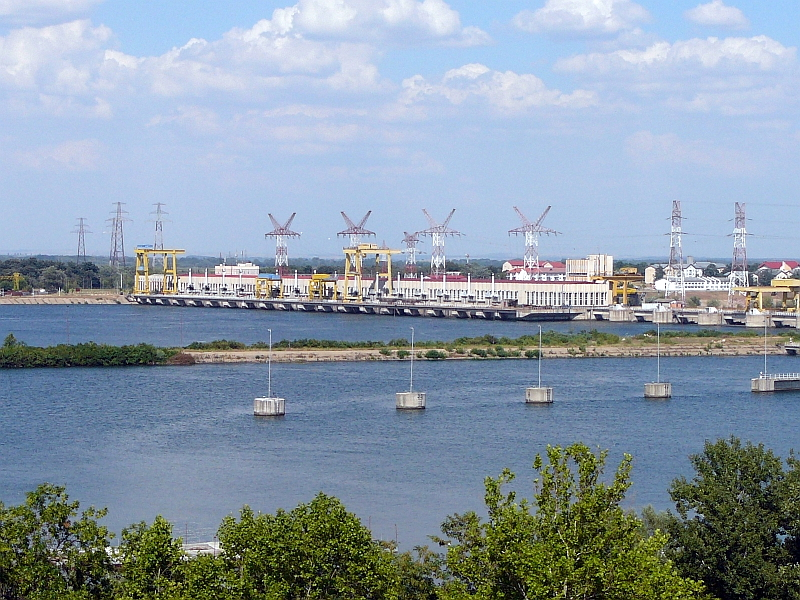

- Location within Romania Location within Serbia
- Location: Gogoșu, Mehedinți County, Romania; Mihajlovac, Bor District, Serbia
- Coordinates: 44°18′16″N 22°33′54″E
- Construction began: 3 December 1977
- Opening date: 12 April 1985

Dam and spillways
- Impounds: Danube River
- Height: 35 m (115 ft)
- Length: 412 m (1,352 ft)

Reservoir
- Creates: Iron Gates II Reservoir
- Total capacity: 0.6 km^{3} (0.14 mi^{3})
- Catchment area: 579,200 km^{2} (223,600 mi^{2})
- Surface area: 52 km^{2} (20 mi^{2})

Power Station
- Turbines: Romania: 10 × 32 MW; Serbia: 10 × 27 MW
- Installed capacity: Romania: 321 MW; Serbia: 270 MW
- Annual generation: Romania: 1.3 TWh; Serbia: 1.31 TWh

The Iron Gate II (Romanian: Porțile de Fier II, Serbian: Ђердап II, romanized: Đerdap II) is a large dam on the Danube River, between Romania and Serbia.

== Characteristics ==
The dam is built at the Danube's 853 km (530 mi). The project started in 1977 as a joint-venture between the governments of Romania and the Yugoslavia for the construction of large dam on the Danube River which would serve both countries. At the time of completion in 1984 the dam had 16 units generating a total of 432 MW, divided equally between the two countries at 216 MW each.

The Romanian part of the power station was modernised and another 2 units were installed; the nominal capacity of the 10 units was increased from 27 MW to 32 MW thus having an installed capacity of 321 MW. The Romanian side of the power station produces approximately 1.3 TWh per annum.

The Serbian part of the power station currently has 10 units with a nominal capacity of 27 MW each and a total power generation capacity of 270 MW. producing approximately 1.31 TWh per annum. At the 27 year anniversary celebration, it was announced that production in 2011 reached 1.46 TWh despite bad weather conditions. As of 2018 the Serbian side of the power plant is in the process of revitalization; when finished, the power of each aggregate will be lifted from 27 to 32 MW.

Current total power generation capacity of the power station is 591 MW.

In 2011, a border checkpoint between Serbia and Romania for cars and light cargo vehicles was opened.

The Iron Gate facilities are run-of-the-river hydroelectricity types with almost constant production. To mitigate the difference between supply and demand, a 64 MW / 256 MWh grid battery is planned at €61.2 million.

== See also ==
- Ostrovul Mare Bridge
- Iron Gate I Hydroelectric Power Station
- Iron Gate III Hydroelectric Power Station
- List of power stations in Romania
- Energy in Romania
- Energy in Serbia
