= Drmno =

Drmno Дрмно
- Village
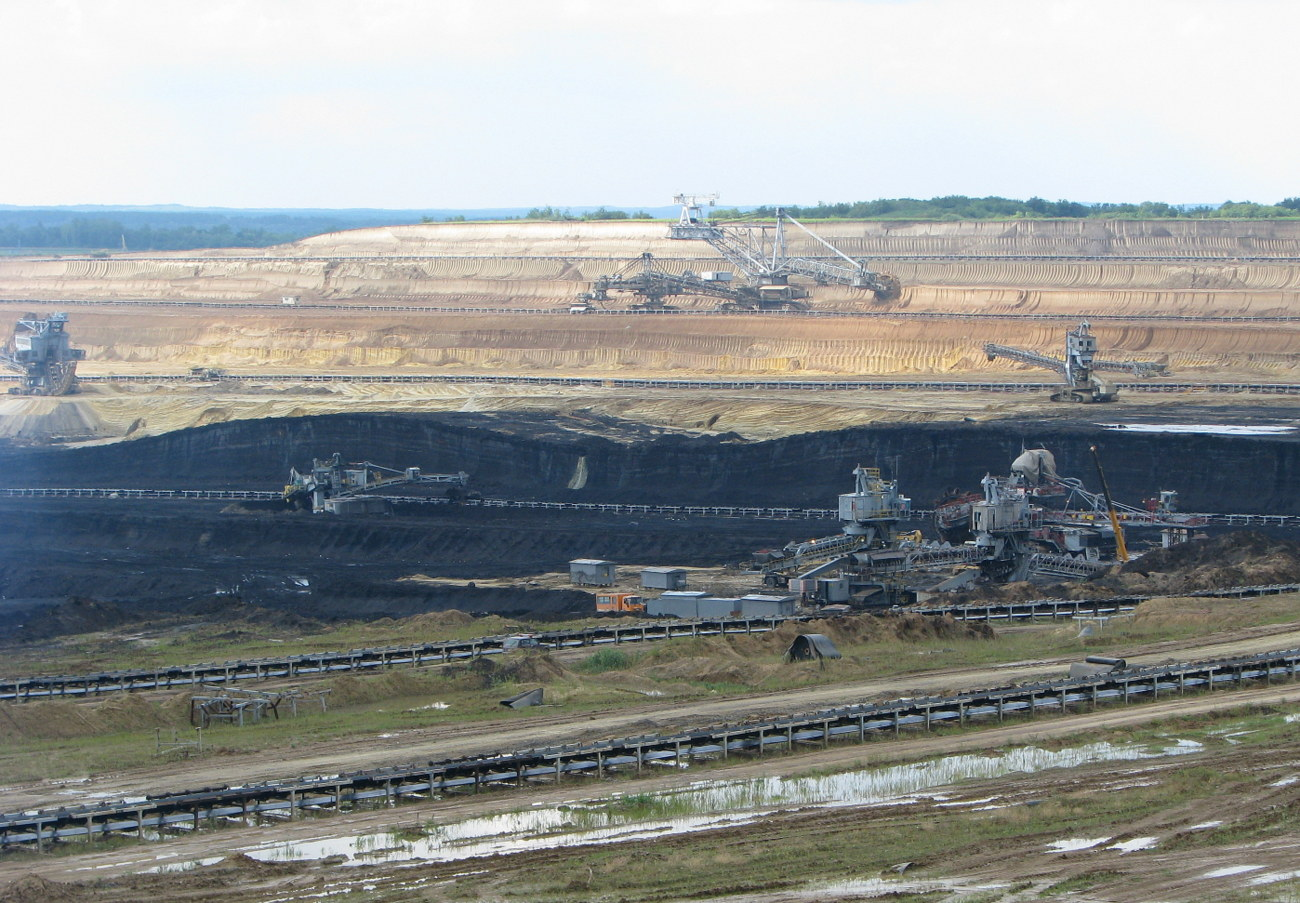
- Kostolac coal basin near Drmno

- Location within Serbia
- Coordinates: 44°42′48″N 21°13′06″E
- Country: Serbia
- District: Braničevo District
- City: Požarevac

Population (2002)
  - Total: 1,046
- Time zone: UTC+1 (CET)
  - Summer (DST): UTC+2 (CEST)

Drmno (Serbian Cyrillic: Дрмно) is a village in the municipality of Požarevac, Serbia, around 60 km east of Belgrade. According to the 2002 census, the village has a population of 1,046 people. The Kostolac coal basin is partly located on the territory of Drmno.

== Archaeology ==
A votive icon of the god Mithras was found here.

In 2023, miners discovered the remains of a Roman ship within a local coal quarry. Archaeologists suggest that the ship, believed to date back to the third or fourth centuries AD, possibly served as a transportation means for supplies along small rivers connecting the Danube to the nearby Roman city of Viminacium.
