= Kosovo =

Country in Southeastern Europe

Republic of Kosovo: Republika e Kosovës (Albanian); Република Косово; Republika Kosovo (Serbian)
- Flag Emblem
- Anthem: Himni i Republikës së Kosovës "Anthem of the Republic of Kosovo"
- Location of Kosovo (green) in Europe (dark grey)
- Status: Independent, claimed by Serbia, independence recognised by 110 UN member states
- Capital and largest city: Pristina (Note: Pristina is the capital of Kosovo and its seat of government. A separate law recognises Prizren as the historic capital of Kosovo.); 42°40′N 21°10′E
- Official languages: Albanian; Serbian
- Recognised regional languages: Bosnian; Turkish; Romani
- Ethnic groups (2024): 91.8% Albanians; 2.3% Serbs; 1.7% Bosniaks; 1.2% Turks; 1.0% Ashkali; 2.0% others
- Religion (2024): 93.5% Islam; 4.1% Christianity; 2.3% Orthodox; 1.8% Catholic; 0.5% No religion; 0.5% others; 1.5% undeclared
- Demonym: Kosovar, Kosovan
- Government: Unitary parliamentary republic
  - President: Justina Shiroka Pula
  - Prime Minister: Albin Kurti
  - Speaker of the Assembly: Albulena Haxhiu
- Legislature: Kuvendi

Establishment
  - Sanjak of Prizren: 1455
  - Kosovo Vilayet: 1877
  - Treaty of London: 1913
  - Autonomous Province within Yugoslavia: 31 January 1946
  - Republic of Kosova: 2 July 1990
  - Kumanovo Agreement: 9 June 1999
  - UN Administration: 10 June 1999
  - Declaration of independence: 17 February 2008
  - End of Steering Group supervision: 10 September 2012
  - Brussels Agreement: 19 April 2013

Area
  - Total: 10,887 km^{2} (4,203 sq mi)
  - Water (%): 1.0

Population
  - 2024 census: ▼1,585,566
  - Density: 146/km^{2} (378.1/sq mi)
- GDP (PPP): 2026 estimate
  - Total: ▲$34.200 billion (148th)
  - Per capita: ▲$21,800 (94th)
- GDP (nominal): 2026 estimate
  - Total: ▲$14.050 billion (155th)
  - Per capita: ▲$8,960 (100th)
- Gini (2017): ▲29.0 low inequality
- HDI (2023): ▲0.797 high
- Currency: Euro (€) (Note: The euro is the official currency in Kosovo even though Kosovo is not a formal member of the eurozone.) (EUR)
- Time zone: UTC+1 (CET)
  - Summer (DST): UTC+2 (CEST)
- Date format: dd.mm.yyyy
- Calling code: +383
- ISO 3166 code: [[ISO 3166-2:XK (Note: XK is a "user assigned" ISO 3166 code not designated by the standard, but used by the European Commission, Switzerland, the Deutsche Bundesbank and other organisations. However, ISO 3166-2:RS-KM remains in use.)|XK (Note: XK is a "user assigned" ISO 3166 code not designated by the standard, but used by the European Commission, Switzerland, the Deutsche Bundesbank and other organisations. However, ISO 3166-2:RS-KM remains in use.)]]
- Internet TLD: .xk (proposed)

Kosovo, (Note: /ˈkɒsəvoʊ/ KOSS-ə-voh; Albanian: Kosova [kɔˈsɔva]; Serbian: Косово / Kosovo [kôsovo]) officially the Republic of Kosovo, (Note: Albanian: Republika e Kosovës; Serbian: Република Косово / Republika Kosovo) is a landlocked country in Southeastern Europe with partial diplomatic recognition. It is bordered by Albania to the southwest, Montenegro to the west, Serbia to the north and east, and North Macedonia to the southeast. It covers an area of 10,887 km^{2} (4,203 sq mi) and has a population of nearly 1.6 million, of whom the vast majority (approximately 92%) are ethnic Albanians. Kosovo has a varied terrain, with high plains along with rolling hills and mountains, some of which have an altitude over 2,500 m (8,200 ft). Its climate is mainly continental with some Mediterranean and Alpine influences. Kosovo's capital and most populous city is Pristina; other major cities and urban areas include Prizren, Ferizaj, Gjilan, and Peja.

Kosovo formed the core territory of the Dardani, an Illyrian people, attested in classical sources from the 4th century BC. The Dardani established the Kingdom of Dardania, with its political and cultural center likely located near present-day Lipjan (ancient Ulpiana). The kingdom was incorporated into the Roman Empire in the 1st century BC; later, in the 3rd century AD, it was transformed into a separate Roman province. During the Byzantine period, the region was eventually organised as part of the Theme of Dardania and remained under imperial control, facing Slavic migrations in the 6th and 7th centuries AD. Control shifted between the Byzantines and the First Bulgarian Empire. In the 13th century, Kosovo became integral to the Serbian medieval state and the establishment of the Serbian Patriarchate. Ottoman expansion in the Balkans in the late 14th and 15th centuries led to the decline and fall of the Serbian Empire; the Battle of Kosovo of 1389, in which a Serbian-led coalition of various ethnicities fought against the Ottoman Empire, is considered one of the defining moments.

Various dynasties, mainly the Branković, governed Kosovo for much of the period after the battle. The Ottoman Empire fully conquered Kosovo after the Second Battle of Kosovo, ruling for nearly five centuries until 1912. Kosovo was the centre of the Albanian Renaissance and experienced the Albanian revolts of 1910 and 1912. After the Balkan Wars (1912–1913), it was ceded to the Kingdom of Serbia, and after World War II, it became an Autonomous Province within Yugoslavia. Tensions between Kosovo's Albanian and Serb communities simmered during the 20th century and occasionally erupted into major violence, culminating in the Kosovo War of 1998 and 1999, which resulted in the Yugoslav Army's withdrawal and the establishment of the United Nations Interim Administration Mission in Kosovo.

Kosovo unilaterally declared its independence from Serbia on 17 February 2008 and has since gained diplomatic recognition by at least 110 member states of the United Nations. Serbia does not officially recognise Kosovo as a sovereign state and continues to claim it as its constituent Autonomous Province of Kosovo and Metohija; however, it accepts the governing authority of the Kosovo institutions as part of the 2013 Brussels Agreement.

Kosovo is a developing country with an upper-middle-income economy. It has experienced significant economic growth over the last decade, as measured by international financial institutions, since the onset of the 2008 financial crisis. Kosovo is a member of the International Monetary Fund, the World Bank Group, European Bank for Reconstruction and Development, Venice Commission, and the International Olympic Committee, and has applied for membership in the Council of Europe, UNESCO, and Interpol, as well as observer status in the Organisation of Islamic Cooperation. In December 2022, Kosovo filed a formal application to become a member of the European Union.

== Etymology ==
The name Kosovo is of South Slavic origin. Kosovo (Косово) is the Serbian neuter possessive adjective of kos (кос), 'blackbird', an ellipsis for Kosovo Polje, 'Blackbird Field', the name of a karst field situated in the eastern half of today's Kosovo and the site of the 1389 Battle of Kosovo Field. In the Middle Ages, territory to the west of Kosovo was known as 'Metohija' because large portions of land were owned by Serbian Orthodox monasteries and the Mount Athos. The name of the karst field was applied to a wider area for the first time when the Ottoman Vilayet of Kosovo was created in 1877.

The entire territory that corresponds to today's country is commonly referred to in English simply as Kosovo and in Albanian as Kosova (definite form) or Kosovë (indefinite form, pronounced [kɔˈsɔvə]). In Serbia, a formal distinction is made between the eastern and western parts of the country; the term Kosovo (Косово) is used for the eastern part of Kosovo centred on the historical Kosovo Field, while the western part of the territory of Kosovo is called Metohija (Albanian: Dukagjin). Thus, in Serbian, the entire area of Kosovo is referred to as Kosovo and Metohija.

The native Albanian name for Western Kosovo is Dukagjini or Dukagjini plateau (Albanian: Rrafshi i Dukagjinit), having been in use since the 15th–16th century as part of the Sanjak of Dukakin with its capital Peja, and is named after the medieval Albanian Dukagjini family.

=== Modern usage ===
Some Albanians also prefer to refer to Kosovo as Dardania, the name of an ancient kingdom and later Roman province which covered the territory of modern-day Kosovo. The name is derived from the ancient tribe of the Dardani, which is considered to be related to the Proto-Albanian term dardā, which means "pear" (Modern Albanian: dardhë). The former Kosovo President Ibrahim Rugova was an enthusiastic backer of a "Dardanian" identity, and the Kosovar presidential flag and seal refer to this national identity. However, the name "Kosova" remains more widely used among the Albanian population. The flag of Dardania remains in use as the official Presidential seal and standard and is heavily featured in the institution of the presidency of the country.

The official conventional long name, as defined by the constitution, is Republic of Kosovo. Additionally, as a result of an arrangement agreed between Pristina and Belgrade in talks mediated by the European Union, Kosovo has participated in some international forums and organisations under the title "Kosovo*" with a footnote stating, "This designation is without prejudice to positions on status, and is in line with United Nations Security Council Resolution 1244 and the International Court of Justice Opinion on the Kosovo declaration of independence." This arrangement, which has been dubbed the "asterisk agreement", was agreed in an 11-point arrangement on 24 February 2012.

== History ==
=== Ancient history ===
The strategic position including the abundant natural resources were favourable for the development of human settlements in Kosovo, as is highlighted by the hundreds of archaeological sites identified throughout its territory.

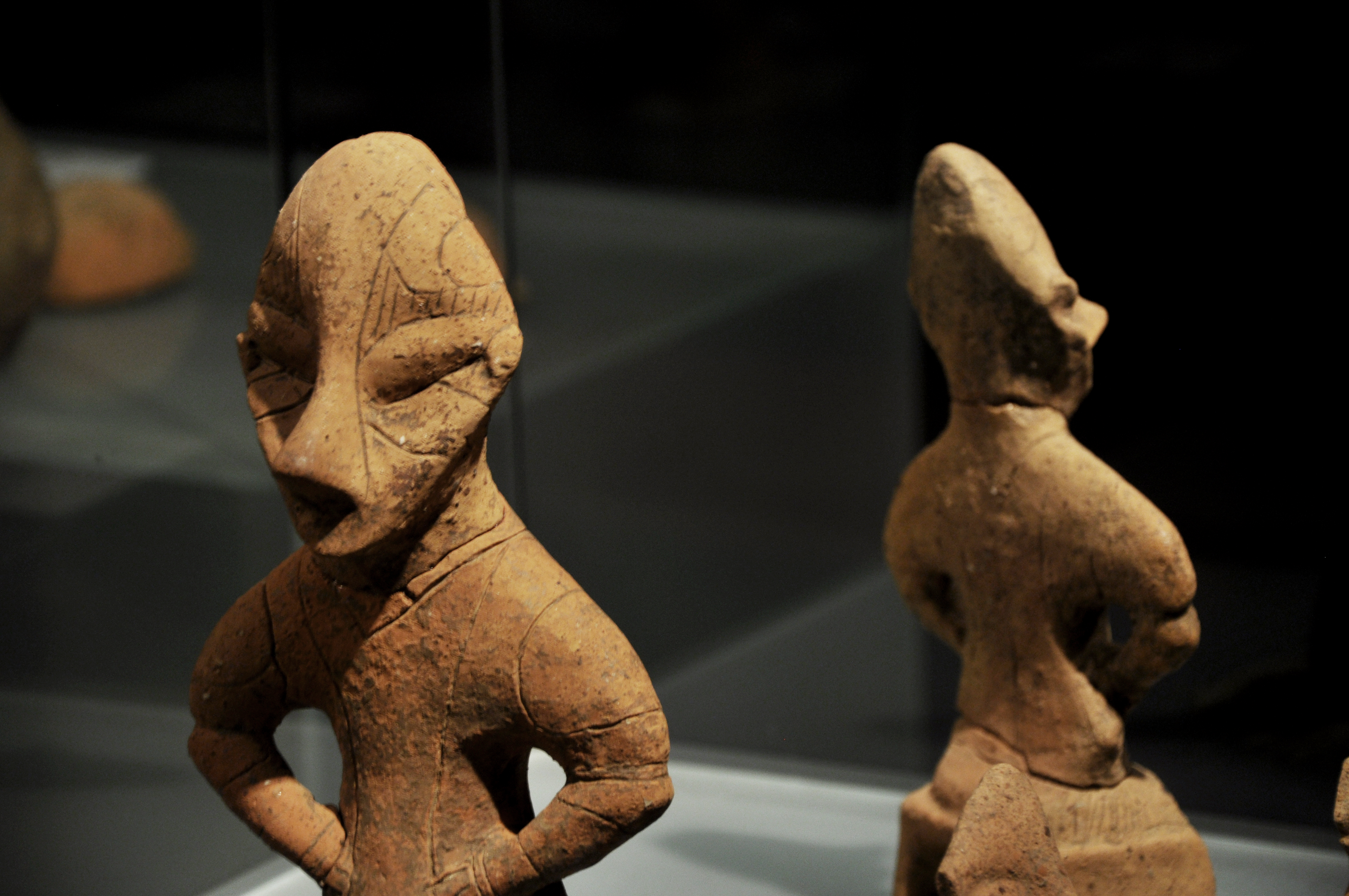
Neolithic Goddess on the Throne is one of the most significant archaeological artefacts of Kosovo and has been adopted as the symbol of Pristina.

Since 2000, the increase in archaeological expeditions has revealed many previously unknown sites. The earliest documented traces in Kosovo are associated to the Stone Age; namely, indications that cave dwellings might have existed, such as Radivojce Cave near the source of the Drin River, Grnčar Cave in Viti municipality and the Dema and Karamakaz Caves in the municipality of Peja.

The earliest archaeological evidence of organised settlement in Kosovo belongs to the Neolithic Starčevo and Vinča cultures. Vlashnjë and Runik are important sites of the Neolithic era with the rock art paintings at Mrrizi i Kobajës near Vlashnjë being the first find of prehistoric art in Kosovo. Amongst the finds of excavations in Neolithic Runik is a baked-clay ocarina, which is the first musical instrument recorded in Kosovo.

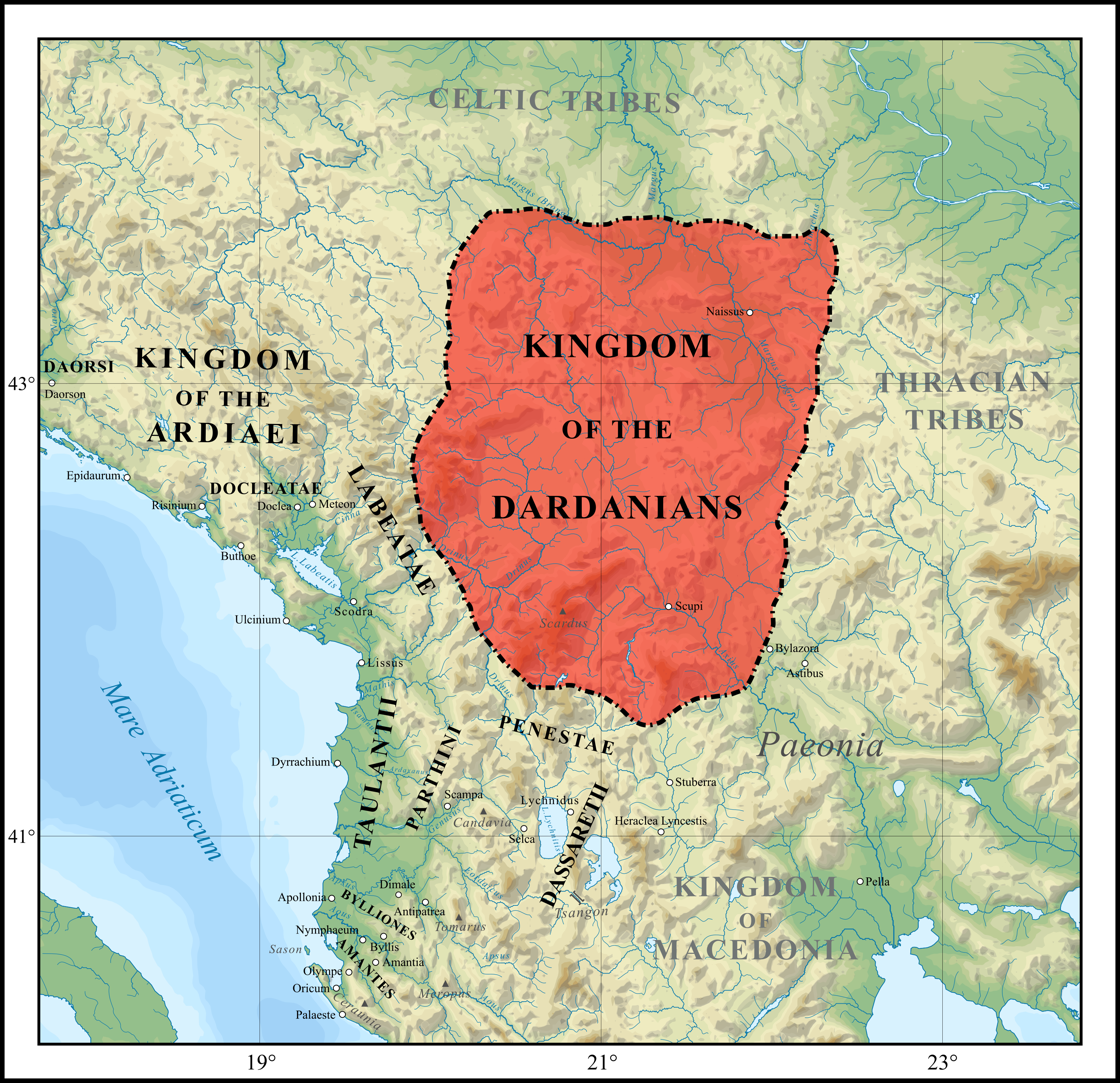
Kingdom of Dardania in the 3rd century BCE

The first archaeological expedition in Kosovo was organised by the Austro-Hungarian army during World War I in the Illyrian tumuli burial grounds of Nepërbishti within the district of Prizren.

The beginning of the Bronze Age coincides with the presence of tumuli burial grounds in western Kosovo, like the site of Romajë.

The Dardani were the most important Paleo-Balkan tribe in the region of Kosovo. A wide area which consists of Kosovo, parts of Northern Macedonia and eastern Serbia was named Dardania after them in classical antiquity, reaching to the Thraco-Illyrian contact zone in the east. In archaeological research, Illyrian names are predominant in western Dardania, while Thracian names are mostly found in eastern Dardania.

Thracian names are absent in western Dardania, while some Illyrian names appear in the eastern parts. Thus, their identification as either an Illyrian or Thracian tribe has been a subject of debate, the ethnolinguistic relationship between the two groups being largely uncertain and debated itself as well. The correspondence of Illyrian names, including those of the ruling elite, in Dardania with those of the southern Illyrians suggests a thracianisation of parts of Dardania. The Dardani retained an individuality and continued to maintain social independence after Roman conquest, playing an important role in the formation of new groupings in the Roman era.

==== Roman period ====
During Roman rule, Kosovo was part of two provinces, with its western region in Praevalitana and the vast majority of its modern territory belonging to Dardania. Praevalitana and the rest of Illyria was conquered by the Roman Republic in 168 BC. On the other hand, Dardania maintained its independence until the year 28 BC, when the Romans, under Augustus, annexed it into their Republic. Dardania eventually became a part of the Moesia province. During the reign of Diocletian, Dardania became a full Roman province and the entirety of Kosovo's modern territory became a part of the Diocese of Moesia, and then during the second half of the 4th century, it became part of the Praetorian prefecture of Illyricum.

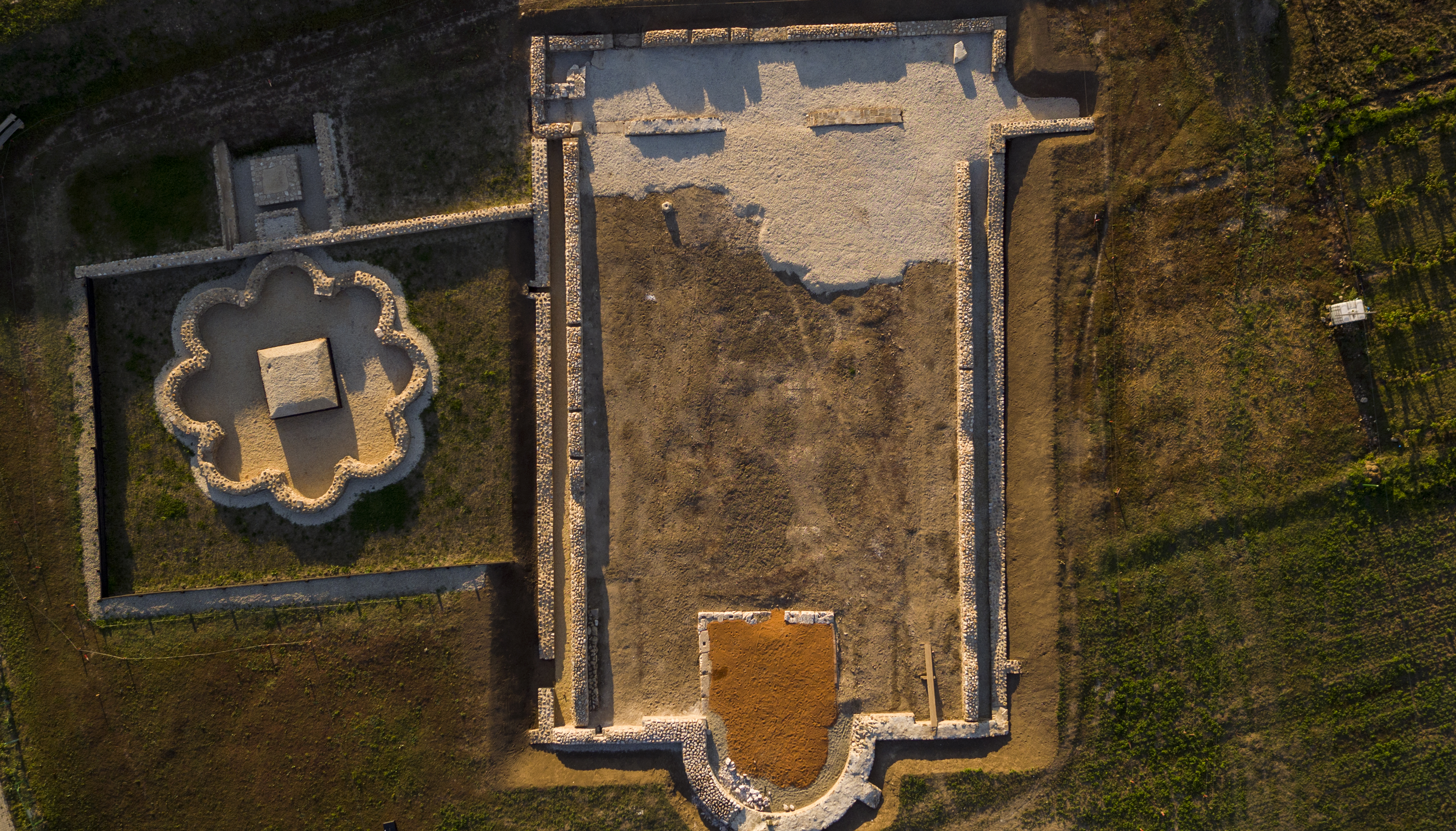
The ruins of Ancient Ulpiana, situated southeast of Pristina. The city, built by Trajan, was an important political, cultural, and financial centre of the Roman province of Dardania.

During Roman rule, a series of settlements developed in the area, mainly close to mines and to the major roads. The most important of the settlements was Ulpiana, which is located near modern-day Gračanica. It was established in the 1st century AD, possibly developing from a concentrated Dardanian oppidum, and then was upgraded to the status of a Roman municipium at the beginning of the 2nd century during the rule of Trajan. Ulpiana became especially important during the rule of Justinian I, after the Emperor rebuilt the city after it had been destroyed by an earthquake and renamed it to Justiniana Secunda.

Other important towns that developed in the area during Roman rule were Vendenis, located in modern-day Podujevë; Viciana, possibly near Vushtrri; and Municipium Dardanorum, an important mining town in Leposavić. Other archaeological sites include Çifllak in Western Kosovo, Dresnik in Klina, Pestova in Vushtrri, Vërban in Viti, Poslishte between Vërmica and Prizren, Paldenica near Hani i Elezit, as well as Nerodimë e Poshtme and Nikadin near Ferizaj. The one thing all the settlements have in common is that they are located either near roads, such as Via Lissus-Naissus, or near the mines of North Kosovo and eastern Kosovo. Most of the settlements are archaeological sites that have been discovered recently and are being excavated.

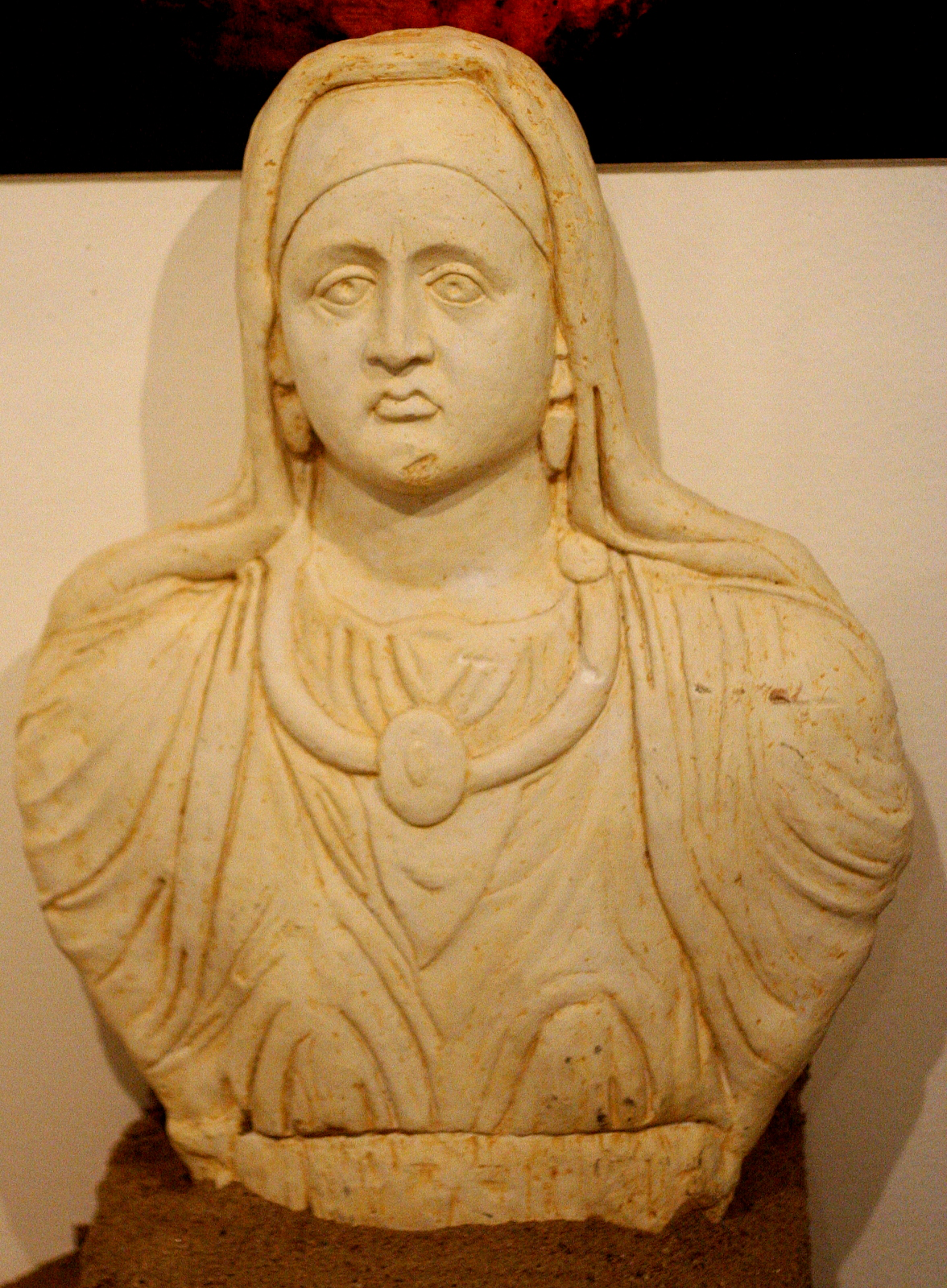
Dea Dardanica, a sculpture representing an ancient deity of the Dardani

It is also known that the region was Christianised during Roman rule, though little is known regarding Christianity in the Balkans in the three first centuries AD. The first clear mention of Christians in literature is the case of Bishop Dacus of Macedonia, from Dardania, who was present at the First Council of Nicaea (325). It is also known that Dardania had a Diocese in the 4th century, and its seat was placed in Ulpiana, which remained the episcopal centre of Dardania until the establishment of Justiniana Prima in 535 AD. The first known bishop of Ulpiana is Machedonius, who was a member of the council of Serdika. Other known bishops were Paulus (synod of Constantinople in 553 AD), and Gregentius, who was sent by Justin I to Ethiopia and Yemen to ease problems among different Christian groups there.

=== Middle Ages ===
In the next centuries, Kosovo was a frontier province of the Roman, and later Byzantine Empire, and as a result it changed hands frequently. The region was exposed to an increasing number of raids from the 4th century AD onward, culminating with the Slavic migrations of the 6th and 7th centuries. Toponymic evidence suggests that Albanian was probably spoken in Kosovo prior to the Slavic settlement of the region. The overwhelming presence of towns and municipalities in Kosovo with Slavic in their toponymy suggests that the Slavic migrations either assimilated or drove out population groups already living in Kosovo.

Toponyms suggest that the Slav presence in Kosovo and southernmost part of the Morava Valley may have been quite weak in the first one or two centuries of Slav settlement as, unlike some other areas of the Balkans, such as Bosnia, Northern Serbia and the Dalmatian hinterlands where old toponyms were completely swept aside, the names of some important old towns and toponyms of mountains survived in the region, including Nish, Shkup, Sharr, Lipjan, and Shtip. The pre-Slavic population in this territory served as a border zone between the early Serbs and Bulgarians which created a division between the Serbo-Croat language and the Bulgarian-Macedonian one. A transitional dialect, the Torlak dialect, is considered to have developed later when the Serbo-Croat speakers expanded into the region in the late medieval period and came in contact with Bulgarian speakers. The Torlak dialect is also considered to have Albanian and Romanian influence. Expansion of Slavs into the region is thought to have led to the spread of the Vlachs (Romanian and Aromanian) into other areas of the Balkans. Only in the ninth century can the expansion of a strong Slav (or quasi-Slav) power into this region be observed. The Bulgarians that pushed westwards across modern Macedonia and eastern Serbia, until by the 850's had taken over Kosovo and were pressing on the border of Serbian Principality. At the same time, southern and central Albania became settled by Bulgarian speakers too and Serb tribes were expanding into Northern Albania.

The First Bulgarian Empire acquired Kosovo by the mid-9th century, but Byzantine control was restored by the late 10th century. In 1072, the leaders of the Bulgarian Uprising of Georgi Voiteh travelled from their centre in Skopje to Prizren and held a meeting in which they invited Mihailo Vojislavljević of Duklja to send them assistance. Mihailo sent his son, Constantine Bodin with 300 of his soldiers. After they met, the Bulgarian magnates proclaimed him "Emperor of the Bulgarians". Demetrios Chomatenos is the last Byzantine archbishop of Ohrid to include Prizren in his jurisdiction until 1219. Stefan Nemanja had seized the area along the White Drin in 1185 to 1195 and the ecclesiastical split of Prizren from the Patriarchate in 1219 was the final act of establishing Nemanjić rule. Konstantin Jireček concluded, from the correspondence of archbishop Demetrios of Ohrid from 1216 to 1236, that Dardania was increasingly populated by Albanians and the expansion started from Gjakova and Prizren area, prior to the Slavic expansion.

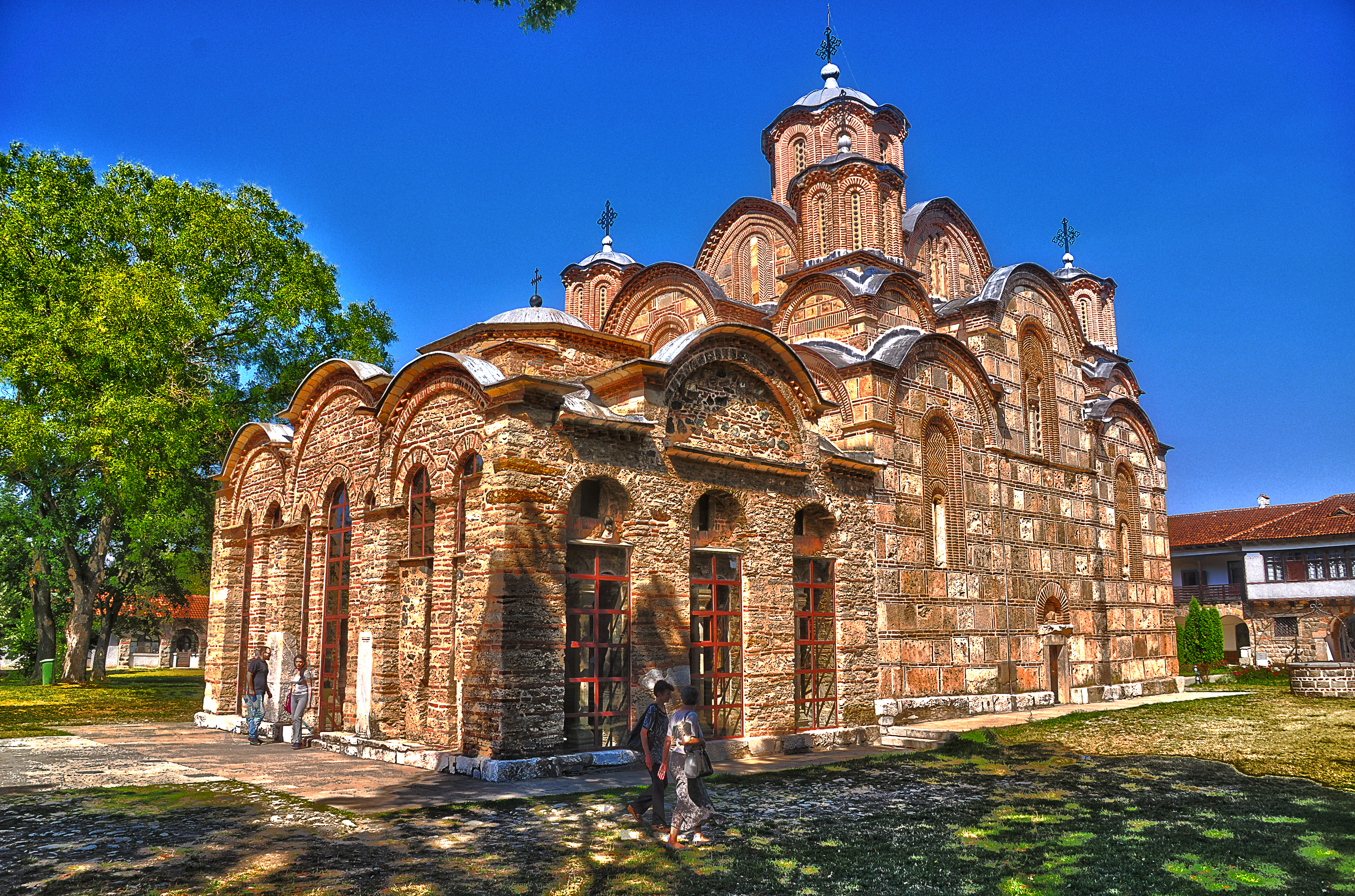
Gračanica Monastery, a UNESCO World Heritage Site

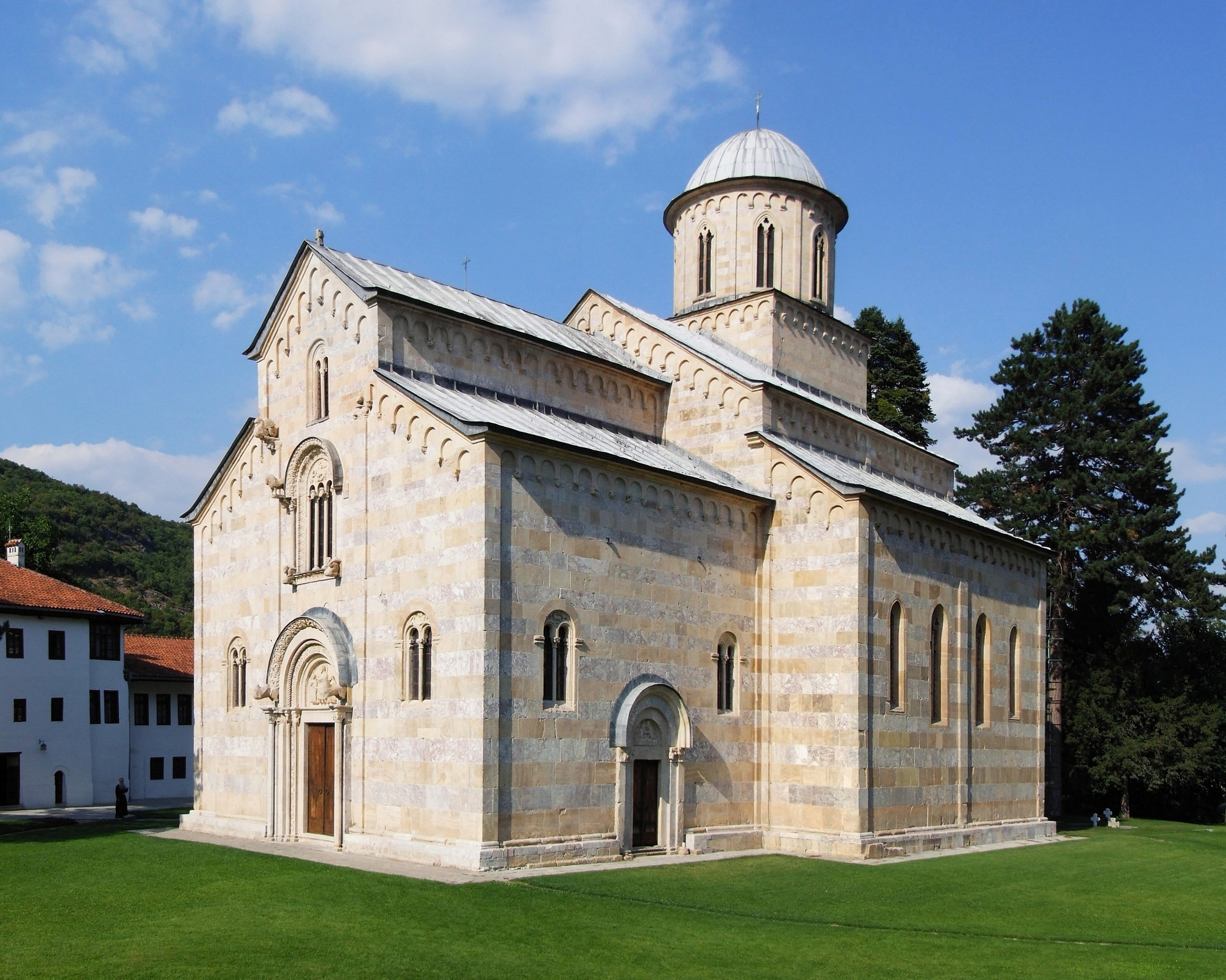
Visoki Dečani Monastery, a UNESCO World Heritage Site

During the 13th and 14th centuries, Kosovo was a political, cultural and religious centre of the Serbian Kingdom. In the late 13th century, the seat of the Serbian Archbishopric was moved to Peja, and rulers centred themselves between Prizren and Skopje, during which time thousands of Christian monasteries and feudal-style forts and castles were erected, with Stefan Dušan using Prizren Fortress as one of his temporary courts for a time. When the Serbian Empire fragmented into a conglomeration of principalities in 1371, Kosovo became the hereditary land of the House of Branković. During the late 14th and early 15th centuries, parts of Kosovo, the easternmost area located near Pristina, were part of the Principality of Dukagjini, which was later incorporated into an anti-Ottoman federation of all Albanian principalities, the League of Lezhë.

In 1330, Serbian king Stefan Dečanski explicitly mentioned the presence of Albanians and the Albanian names of villages in Kosovo, in particular in the districts of Prizren and that of Skopje. A chrysobull of the Serbian Tsar Stefan Dušan that was given to the Monastery of Saint Mihail and Gavril in Prizren between the years of 1348-1353 states the presence of Albanians in the vicinity of Prizren, the Dukagjin Plain and in the villages of Drenica. Within this chrysobull, nine Albanian stock-breeding villages within the vicinity of Prizren are mentioned explicitly; entire Albanian villages were gifted by Serbian kings, particularly Stefan Dušan as presents to Serb monasteries within Prizren, Deçan and Tetova. In one of Nemanjas charter, 170 Vlachs are mentioned in the area of Prizren. When Dečanski founded his monastery of Dečani in 1330, he referred to ‘villages and katuns of Vlachs and Albanians’ in the area of the white Drin. Vlachs and Albanians had to carry salt and provide serf labour for the monastery.

Medieval Monuments in Kosovo is a combined UNESCO World Heritage Site consisting of four Serbian Orthodox churches and monasteries in Deçan, Peja, Prizren and Gračanica. The constructions were founded by members of the Nemanjić dynasty, a prominent dynasty of mediaeval Serbia.

==== Ottoman rule ====
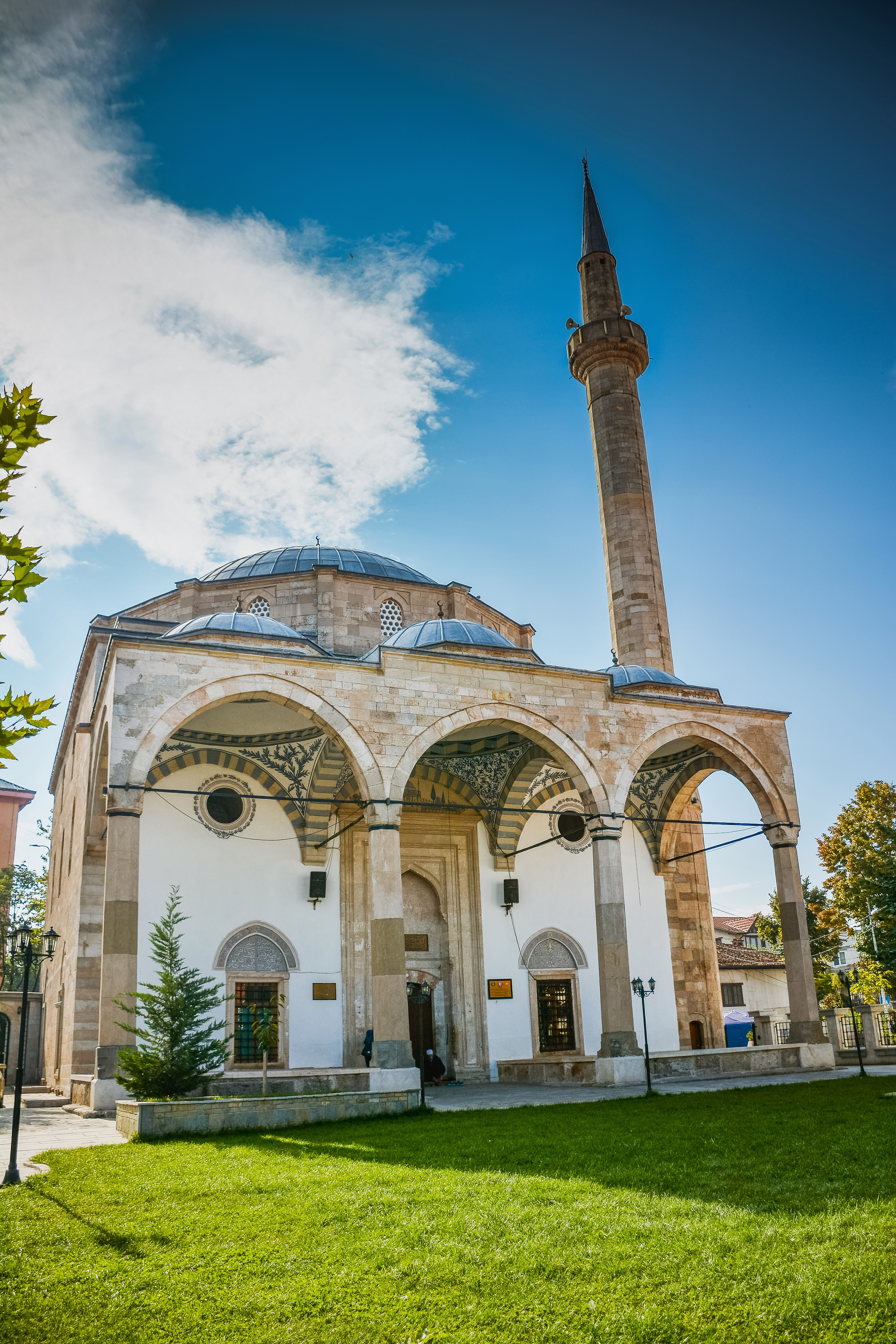
The Imperial Mosque of Pristina built by Sultan Mehmed the Conqueror, 1461

In 1389, as the Ottoman Empire expanded northwards through the Balkans, Ottoman forces under Sultan Murad I met with a Christian coalition led by Moravian Serbia under Prince Lazar in the Battle of Kosovo. Both sides suffered heavy losses and the battle was a stalemate and it was even reported as a Christian victory at first, but Serbian manpower was depleted and de facto Serbian rulers could not raise another equal force to the Ottoman army.

Different parts of Kosovo were ruled directly or indirectly by the Ottomans in this early period. The medieval town of Novo Brdo was under Lazar's son, Stefan who became a loyal Ottoman vassal and instigated the downfall of Vuk Branković who eventually joined the Hungarian anti-Ottoman coalition and was defeated in 1395–96. A small part of Vuk's land with the villages of Pristina and Vushtrri was given to his sons to hold as Ottoman vassals for a brief period.

During this period, Islam was introduced to the region. The Ottomans appeared to have a more deliberate approach to converting the Roman Catholic population who were mostly Albanians (and were most of the converts to Islam) in comparison with the mostly Serbian adherents of Eastern Orthodoxy, as they viewed the former less favourably due to its allegiance to Rome, a competing regional power. Travelling Kosovo in the 1660s, Ottoman traveller Evliya Celebi included Western and Central Kosovo and the Llapi area in north-east Kosovo as part of Albania.

In 1690, Kosovo Albanian Pjetër Bogdani led a revolt against the Ottoman Empire in Kosovo. Sources from 1690 refer to 20,000 Albanians in Kosovo having turned their weapons against the Turks. Following the Great Turkish War, a number of Serbs migrated northwards to Habsburg territories near the Danube and Sava rivers led by Serbian Patriarch Arsenije III Crnojević. There were also some Christian and Muslim Albanians who departed. Afterwards, the Ottomans encouraged the migration of Albanians into Kosovo. The larger, eastern part of Kosovo remained overwhelmingly Serb Orthodox, with a Catholic Albanian, and later Muslim Albanian, presence growing from the west by the 16th century.

==== Rise of nationalism ====
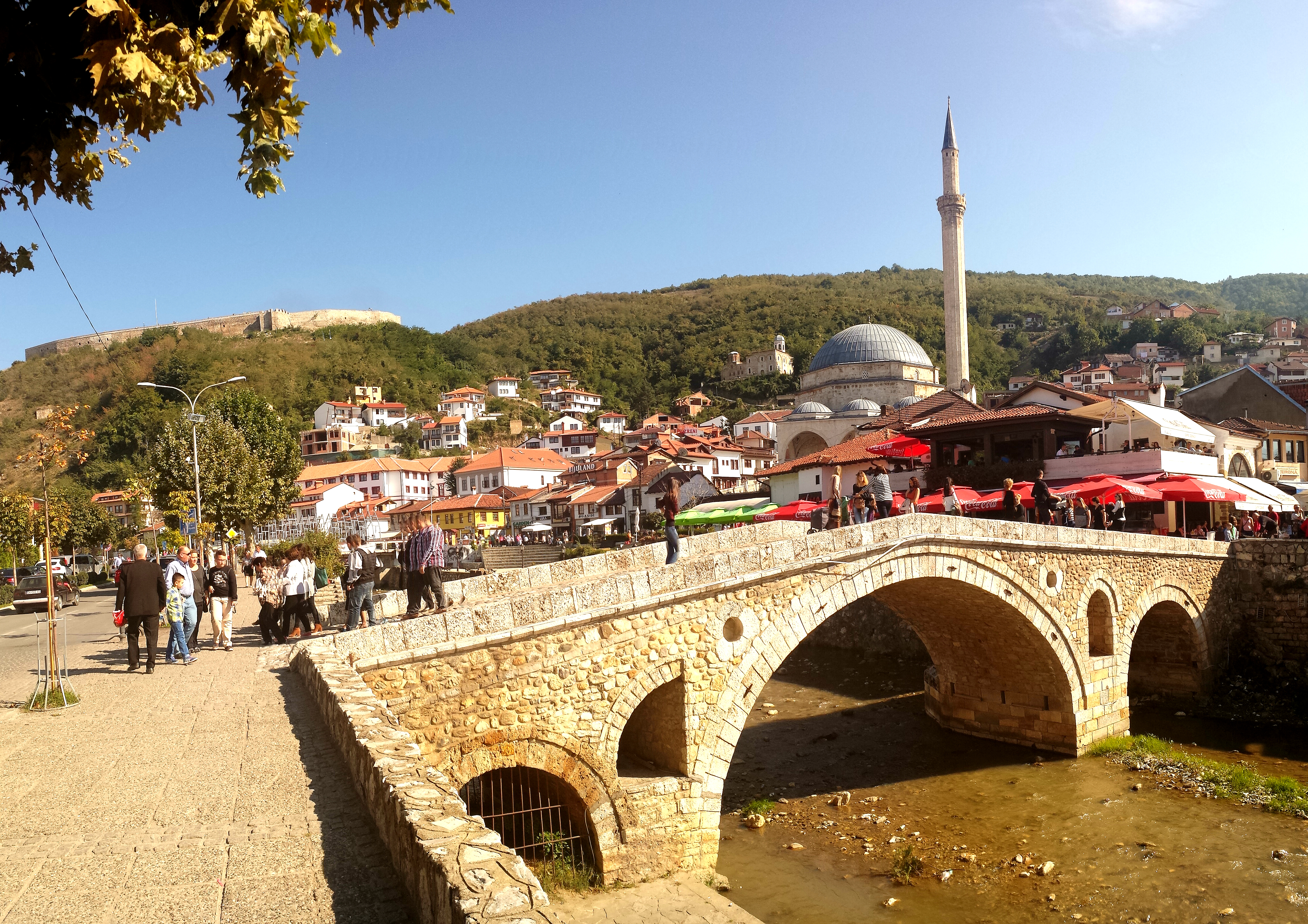
The city of Prizren was the cultural and intellectual centre of Kosovo during the Ottoman period in the Middle Ages and is now the historic capital of Kosovo.

In the 19th century, there was an awakening of ethnic nationalism throughout the Balkans. The underlying ethnic tensions became part of a broader struggle of Christian Serbs against Muslim Albanians. The ethnic Albanian nationalism movement was centred in Kosovo. In 1878 the League of Prizren (Lidhja e Prizrenit) was formed, a political organisation that sought to unify all the Albanians of the Ottoman Empire in a common struggle for autonomy and greater cultural rights, although they generally desired the continuation of the Ottoman Empire. The League was dis-established in 1881 but enabled the awakening of a national identity among Albanians, whose ambitions competed with those of the Serbs, the Kingdom of Serbia wishing to incorporate this land that had formerly been within its empire.

The modern Albanian-Serbian conflict has its roots in the expulsion of the Albanians in 1877–1878 from areas that became incorporated into the Principality of Serbia. During and after the Serbian–Ottoman War of 1876–78, between 30,000 and 70,000 Muslims, mostly Albanians, were expelled by the Serb army from the Sanjak of Niš and fled to the Kosovo Vilayet. According to Austrian data, by the 1890s Kosovo was 70% Muslim (nearly entirely of Albanian descent) and less than 30% non-Muslim (primarily Serbs). In May 1901, Albanians pillaged and partially burned the cities of Novi Pazar, Sjenica and Pristina, and killed many Serbs near Pristina and in Kolašin (now North Kosovo).

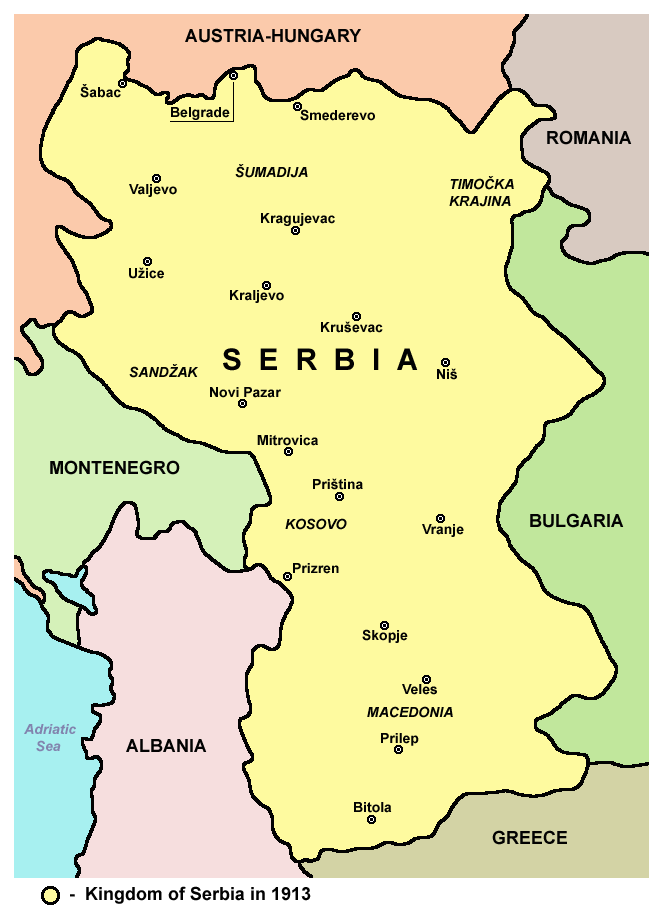
Division of Kosovo Vilayet between the Kingdom of Serbia (yellow) and the Kingdom of Montenegro (green) following the Balkan Wars in 1913

In the spring of 1912, Albanians under the lead of Hasan Prishtina revolted against the Ottoman Empire. The rebels were joined by a wave of Albanians in the Ottoman army ranks, who deserted the army, refusing to fight their own kin. The rebels defeated the Ottomans and the latter were forced to accept all fourteen demands of the rebels, which foresaw an effective autonomy for the Albanians living in the Empire. However, this autonomy never materialised, and the revolt created serious weaknesses in the Ottoman ranks, luring Montenegro, Serbia, Bulgaria, and Greece into declaring war on the Ottoman Empire and starting the First Balkan War.

After the Ottomans' defeat in the First Balkan War, the 1913 Treaty of London was signed with Metohija ceded to the Kingdom of Montenegro and eastern Kosovo ceded to the Kingdom of Serbia. During the Balkan Wars, over 100,000 Albanians left Kosovo and about 50,000 were killed in the massacres that accompanied the war. Soon, there were concerted Serbian colonisation efforts in Kosovo during various periods between Serbia's 1912 takeover of the province and World War II, causing the population of Serbs in Kosovo to grow by about 58,000 in this period.

Serbian authorities promoted creating new Serb settlements in Kosovo as well as the assimilation of Albanians into Serbian society, causing a mass exodus of Albanians from Kosovo. The figures of Albanians forcefully expelled from Kosovo range between 60,000 and 239,807, while Noel Malcolm mentions 100,000–120,000. In combination with the politics of extermination and expulsion, there was also a process of assimilation through religious conversion of Albanian Muslims and Albanian Catholics into the Serbian Orthodox religion which took place as early as 1912. These politics seem to have been inspired by the nationalist ideologies of Ilija Garašanin and Jovan Cvijić.

In the winter of 1915–16, during World War I, Kosovo saw the retreat of the Serbian army as Kosovo was occupied by Bulgaria and Austria-Hungary. In 1918, the Allied Powers pushed the Central Powers out of Kosovo.

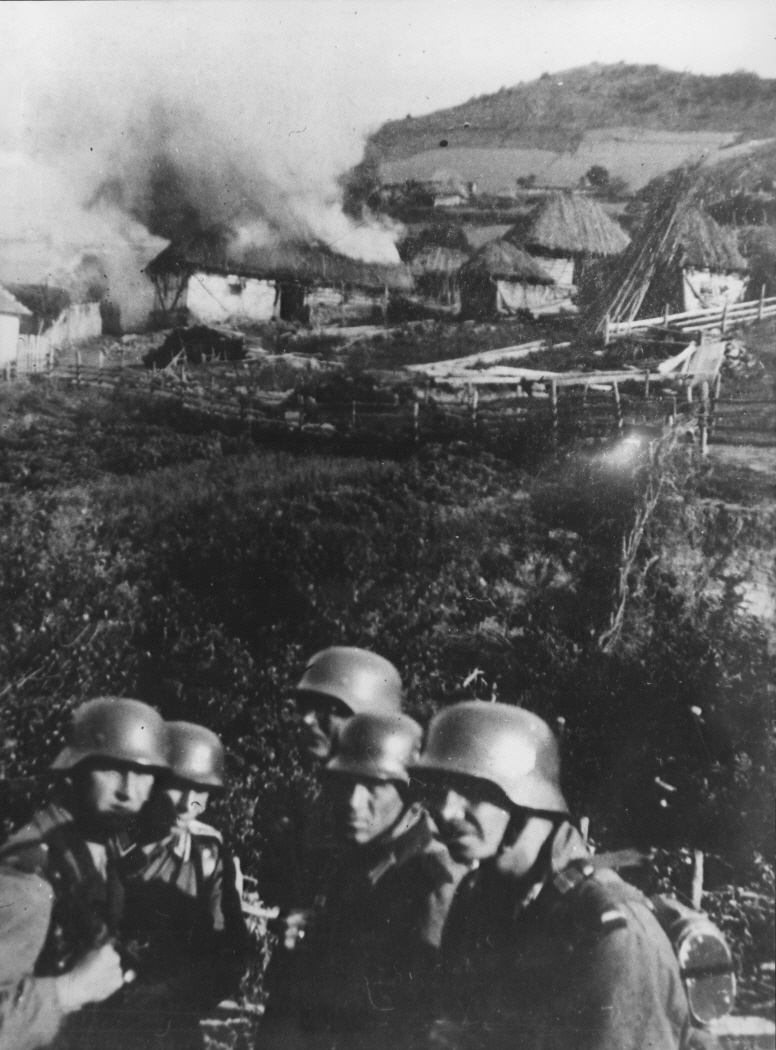
German soldiers set fire to a Serbian village near Mitrovica, c. 1941.

A new administration system on 26 April 1922 split Kosovo among three districts (oblast) of the Kingdom: Kosovo, Raška and Zeta. In 1929, the country was transformed into the Kingdom of Yugoslavia and the territories of Kosovo were reorganised among the Banate of Zeta, the Banate of Morava and the Banate of Vardar. In order to change the ethnic composition of Kosovo, between 1912 and 1941 a large-scale Serbian colonisation of Kosovo was undertaken by the Belgrade government. Kosovar Albanians' right to receive education in their own language was denied alongside other non-Slavic or unrecognised Slavic nations of Yugoslavia, as the kingdom only recognised the Slavic Croat, Serb, and Slovene nations as constituent nations of Yugoslavia. Other Slavs had to identify as one of the three official Slavic nations and non-Slav nations deemed as minorities.

Albanians and other Muslims were forced to emigrate, mainly with the land reform which struck Albanian landowners in 1919, but also with direct violent measures. In 1935 and 1938, two agreements between the Kingdom of Yugoslavia and Turkey were signed on the expatriation of 240,000 Albanians to Turkey, but the expatriation did not occur due to the outbreak of World War II.

After the Axis invasion of Yugoslavia in 1941, most of Kosovo was assigned to Italian-controlled Albania, and the rest was controlled by Germany and Bulgaria. A three-dimensional conflict ensued, involving inter-ethnic, ideological, and international affiliations. Albanian collaborators persecuted Serb and Montenegrin settlers. Estimates differ, but most authors estimate that between 3,000 and 10,000 Serbs and Montenegrins were killed in Kosovo during the Second World War. Another 30,000 to 40,000, or as high as 100,000, Serbs and Montenegrins, mainly colonists, were deported to Serbia. A decree from Yugoslav leader Josip Broz Tito, followed by a new law in August 1945 disallowed the return of colonists who had taken land from Albanian peasants. During the war years, some Serbs and Montenegrins were sent to concentration camps in Pristina and Mitrovica. Nonetheless, these conflicts were relatively low-level compared with other areas of Yugoslavia during the war years. Two Serb historians also estimate that 12,000 Albanians died. An official investigation conducted by the Yugoslav government in 1964 recorded nearly 8,000 war-related fatalities in Kosovo between 1941 and 1945, 5,489 of them Serb or Montenegrin and 2,177 Albanian. Some sources note that up to 72,000 individuals were encouraged to settle or resettle into Kosovo from Albania by the short-lived Italian administration. As the regime collapsed, this never materialised, as a large-scale migration of Albanians from Albania to Kosovo is not recorded in Axis documents.

=== Communist Yugoslavia ===
The flag of the Albanian minority of Kosovo in the Socialist Federal Republic of Yugoslavia

The existing province took shape in 1945 as the Autonomous Region of Kosovo and Metohija, with a final demarcation in 1959. Until 1945, the only entity bearing the name of Kosovo in the late modern period had been the Vilayet of Kosovo, a political unit created by the Ottoman Empire in 1877. However, those borders were different.

Tensions between ethnic Albanians and the Yugoslav government were significant, not only due to ethnic tensions but also due to political ideological concerns, especially regarding relations with neighbouring Albania. Harsh repressive measures were imposed on Kosovo Albanians due to suspicions that there were sympathisers of the Stalinist regime of Enver Hoxha of Albania. In 1956, a show trial in Pristina was held in which multiple Albanian Communists of Kosovo were convicted of being infiltrators from Albania and given long prison sentences. High-ranking Serbian communist official Aleksandar Ranković sought to secure the position of the Serbs in Kosovo and gave them dominance in Kosovo's nomenklatura.

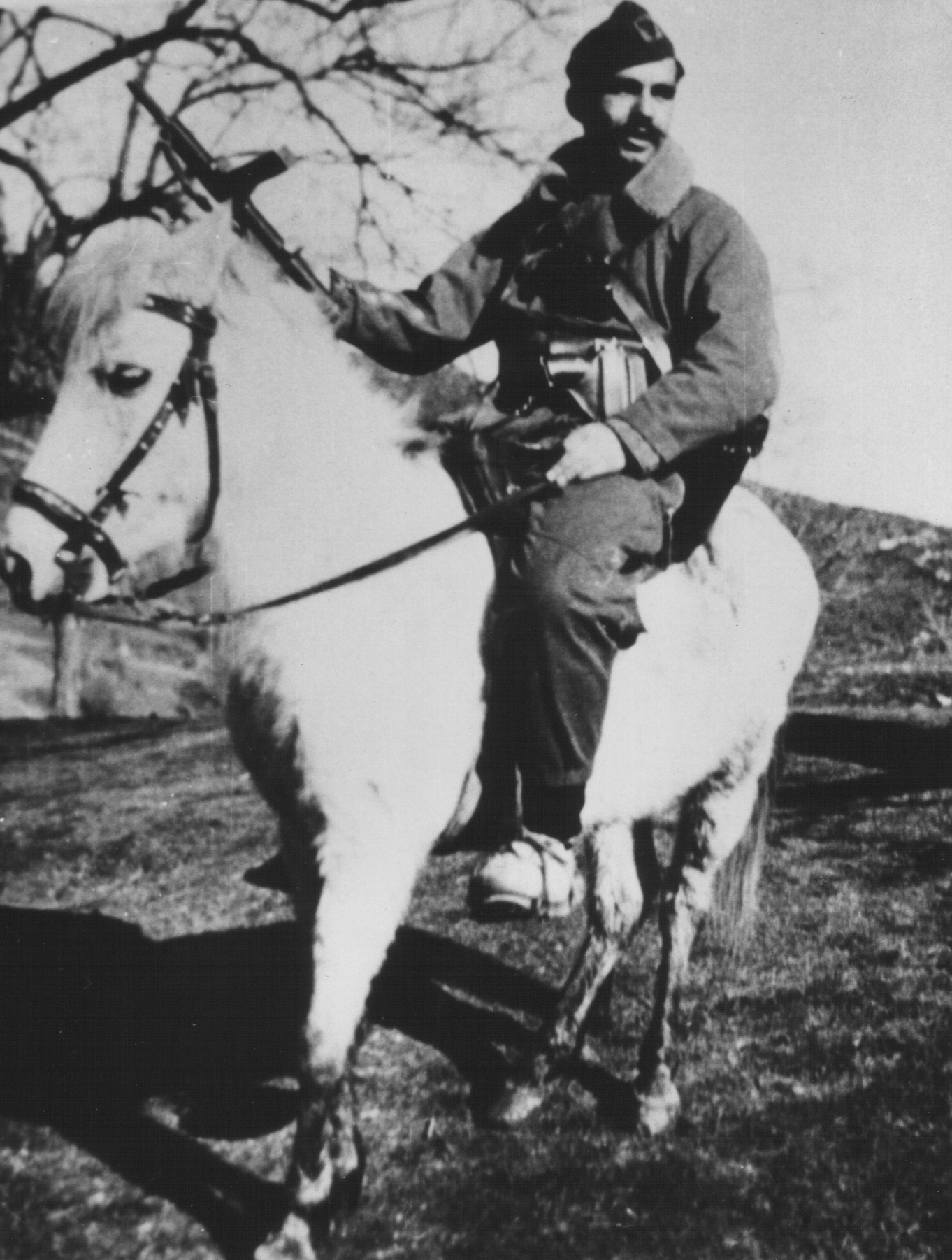
Fadil Hoxha, the vice-president of Socialist Federal Republic of Yugoslavia, from 1978 to 1979

Islam in Kosovo at this time was repressed and both Albanians and Muslim Slavs were encouraged to declare themselves to be Turkish and emigrate to Turkey. At the same time Serbs and Montenegrins dominated the government, security forces, and industrial employment in Kosovo. Albanians resented these conditions and protested against them in the late 1960s, calling the actions taken by authorities in Kosovo colonialist, and demanding that Kosovo be made a republic, or declaring support for Albania.

After the ouster of Ranković in 1966, the agenda of pro-decentralisation reformers in Yugoslavia succeeded in the late 1960s in attaining substantial decentralisation of powers, creating substantial autonomy in Kosovo and Vojvodina, and recognising a Muslim Yugoslav nationality. As a result of these reforms, there was a massive overhaul of Kosovo's nomenklatura and police, that shifted from being Serb-dominated to ethnic Albanian-dominated through firing Serbs in large scale. Further concessions were made to the ethnic Albanians of Kosovo in response to unrest, including the creation of the University of Pristina as an Albanian language institution. These changes created widespread fear among Serbs that they were being made second-class citizens in Yugoslavia. By the 1974 Yugoslav Constitution, Kosovo was granted major autonomy, allowing it to have its own administration, assembly, and judiciary; as well as having a membership in the collective presidency and the Yugoslav parliament, in which it held veto power.

In the aftermath of the 1974 constitution, concerns over the rise of Albanian nationalism in Kosovo rose with the widespread celebrations in 1978 of the 100th anniversary of the founding of the League of Prizren. Albanians felt that their status as a "minority" in Yugoslavia had made them second-class citizens in comparison with the "nations" of Yugoslavia and demanded that Kosovo be a constituent republic, alongside the other republics of Yugoslavia. Protests by Albanians in 1981 over the status of Kosovo resulted in Yugoslav territorial defence units being brought into Kosovo and a state of emergency being declared resulting in violence and the protests being crushed. In the aftermath of the 1981 protests, purges took place in the Communist Party, and rights that had been recently granted to Albanians were rescinded – including ending the provision of Albanian professors and Albanian language textbooks in the education system.

While Albanians in the region had the highest birth rates in Europe, other areas of Yugoslavia including Serbia had low birth rates. Increased urbanisation and economic development led to higher settlements of Albanian workers into Serb-majority areas, as Serbs departed in response to the economic climate for more favourable real estate conditions in Serbia. While there was tension, charges of "genocide" and planned harassment have been discredited as a pretext to revoke Kosovo's autonomy. For example, in 1986 the Serbian Orthodox Church published an official claim that Kosovo Serbs were being subjected to an Albanian program of 'genocide'. Though these charges were disproved by police statistics, they received wide attention in the Serbian press which led to further ethnic tensions and eventual removal of Kosovo's status.

Beginning in March 1981, Kosovar Albanian students of the University of Pristina organised protests seeking to make Kosovo a republic within Yugoslavia and demanding their human rights. The protests were brutally suppressed by the police and army, with many protesters arrested. During the 1980s, ethnic tensions continued with frequent violent outbreaks against Yugoslav state authorities, resulting in a further increase in emigration of Kosovo Serbs and other ethnic groups. The Yugoslav leadership tried to suppress protests of Kosovo Serbs seeking protection from ethnic discrimination and violence.

=== Kosovo War ===
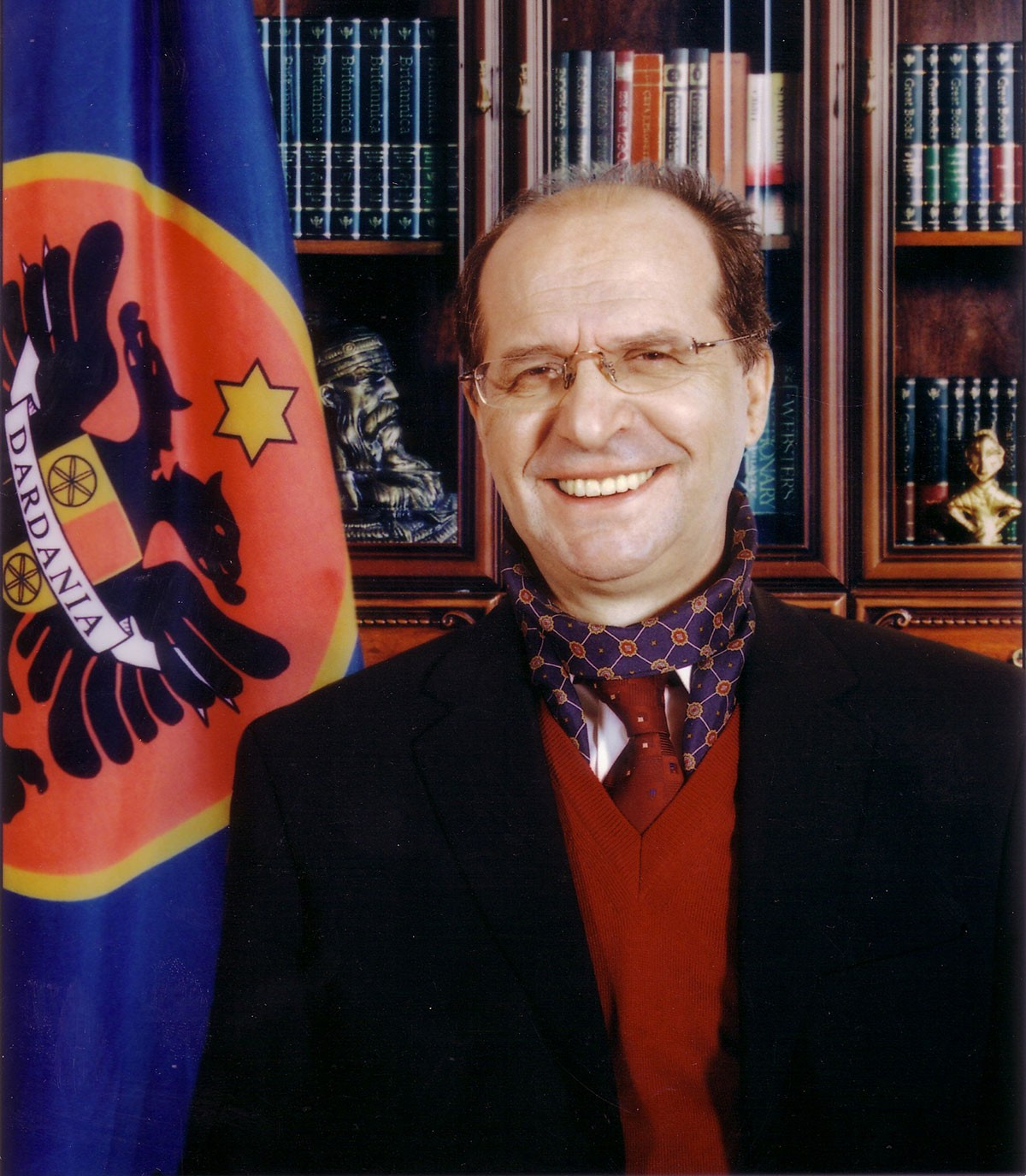
Ibrahim Rugova advocated for the rights of Kosovar Albanians and their self-determination.

Inter-ethnic tensions continued to worsen in Kosovo throughout the 1980s. In 1989, Serbian President Slobodan Milošević, employing a mix of intimidation and political maneuvering, drastically reduced Kosovo's special autonomous status within Serbia and started cultural oppression of the ethnic Albanian population. Kosovar Albanians responded with a non-violent separatist movement, employing widespread civil disobedience and creation of parallel structures in education, medical care, and taxation, with the ultimate goal of achieving the independence of Kosovo.

In July 1990, Kosovo Albanians proclaimed the existence of the Republic of Kosova, and declared it a sovereign and independent state in September 1992. In May 1992, Ibrahim Rugova was elected its president. During its lifetime, the Republic of Kosova was only officially recognised by Albania. By the mid-1990s, the Kosovo Albanian population was growing restless, as the status of Kosovo was not resolved as part of the Dayton Agreement of November 1995, which ended the Bosnian War. By 1996, the Kosovo Liberation Army (KLA), an ethnic Albanian guerrilla paramilitary group that sought the separation of Kosovo and the eventual creation of a Greater Albania, had prevailed over Rugova's non-violent resistance movement and launched attacks against the Yugoslav Army and Serbian police in Kosovo, resulting in the Kosovo War.

By 1998, international pressure compelled Yugoslavia to sign a ceasefire and partially withdraw its security forces. Events were to be monitored by Organization for Security and Co-operation in Europe (OSCE) observers according to an agreement negotiated by Richard Holbrooke. The ceasefire did not hold and fighting resumed in December 1998, culminating in the Račak massacre, which attracted further international attention to the conflict. Within weeks, a multilateral international conference was convened and by March had prepared a draft agreement known as the Rambouillet Accords, calling for the restoration of autonomy for Kosovo and the deployment of NATO peacekeeping forces. The Yugoslav delegation found the terms unacceptable and refused to sign the draft. Between 24 March and 10 June 1999, NATO intervened by bombing Yugoslavia, aiming to force Milošević to withdraw his forces from Kosovo, though NATO could not appeal to any particular motion of the Security Council of the United Nations to help legitimise its intervention. Combined with continued skirmishes between Albanian guerrillas and Yugoslav forces the conflict resulted in a further massive displacement of population in Kosovo.

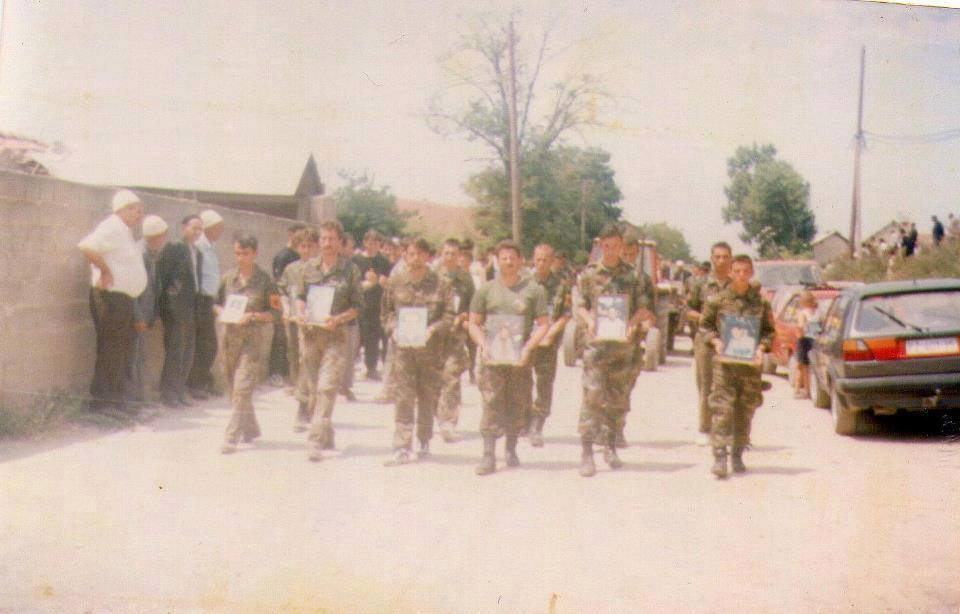
Kosovar Albanian soldiers holding pictures in memory of the men who were killed or went missing in the Krusha massacres

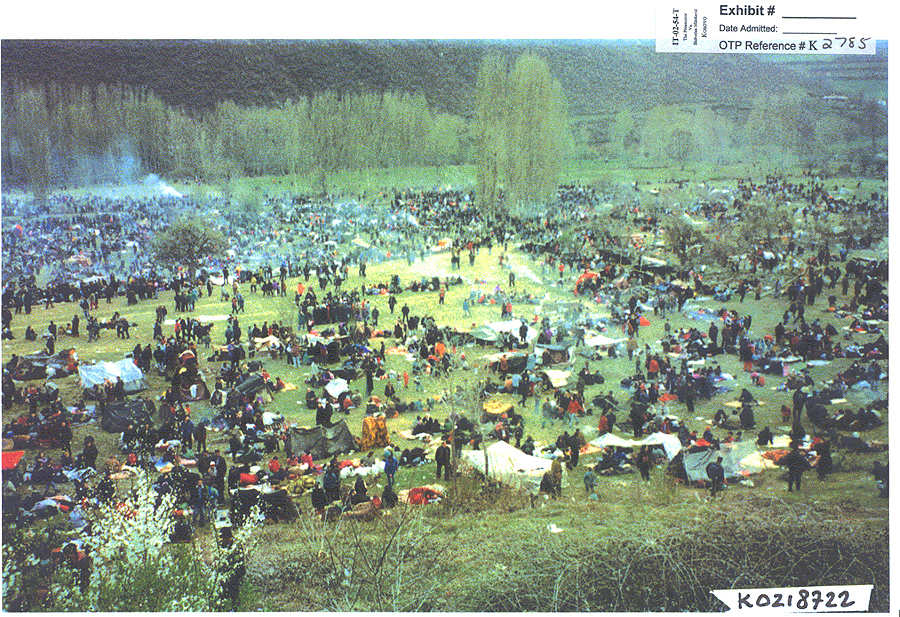
Photograph of Kosovo Albanian refugees during the Kosovo War, presented as evidence at the trial of Slobodan Milošević

During the conflict, between 848,000 and 863,000 ethnic Albanians fled or were forcefully driven from Kosovo and an additional 590,000 were internally displaced. Some sources claim that this ethnic cleansing of Albanians was part of a plan known as Operation Horseshoe, described as "Milosevic's final solution to the Kosovo problem". However, the existence and implementation of this plan has not been proven.

During the war, over 90,000 Serbian and other non-Albanian refugees fled the province. In September 1998, Serbian police collected 34 bodies of people believed to have been seized and murdered by the KLA, among them some ethnic Albanians, at Lake Radonjić near Glođane (Gllogjan) in what became known as the Lake Radonjić massacre, the most serious atrocity by the KLA during the conflict. By June, Milošević agreed to a foreign military presence in Kosovo and the withdrawal of his troops. In the days after the Yugoslav Army withdrew, over 80,000 Serb and other non-Albanian civilians (almost half of 200,000 estimated to live in Kosovo) were expelled from Kosovo, and many of the remaining civilians were victims of abuse. After the Kosovo and other Yugoslav Wars, Serbia became home to the highest number of refugees and IDPs (including Kosovo Serbs) in Europe.

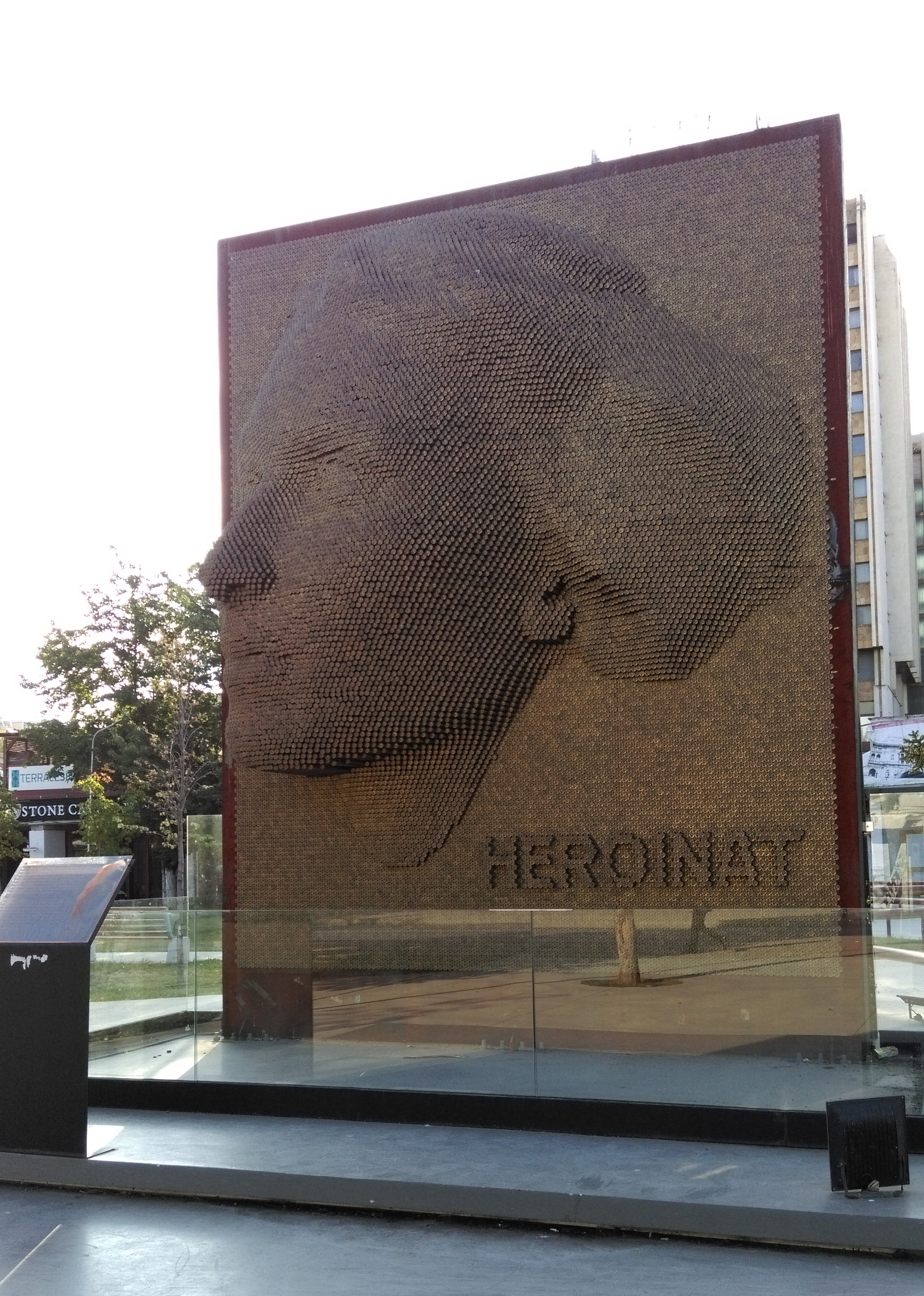
"Heroinat" (Heroines) monument in Pristina. It is dedicated to women victims of sexual violence perpetrated by Serbian forces, during the Kosovo War, of which the vast majority were Albanian women.

The International Criminal Tribunal for the former Yugoslavia (ICTY) prosecuted crimes committed during the Kosovo War. Nine senior Yugoslav officials, including Milošević, were indicted for crimes against humanity and war crimes committed between January and June 1999. Six of the defendants were convicted, one was acquitted, one died before his trial could commence, and one (Milošević) died before his trial could conclude. Six KLA members were charged with crimes against humanity and war crimes by the ICTY following the war, and one was convicted.

In total around 10,317 civilians were killed during the war, of whom 8,676 were Albanians, 1,196 Serbs and 445 Roma and others in addition to 3,218 killed members of armed formations.

=== United Nations administration ===
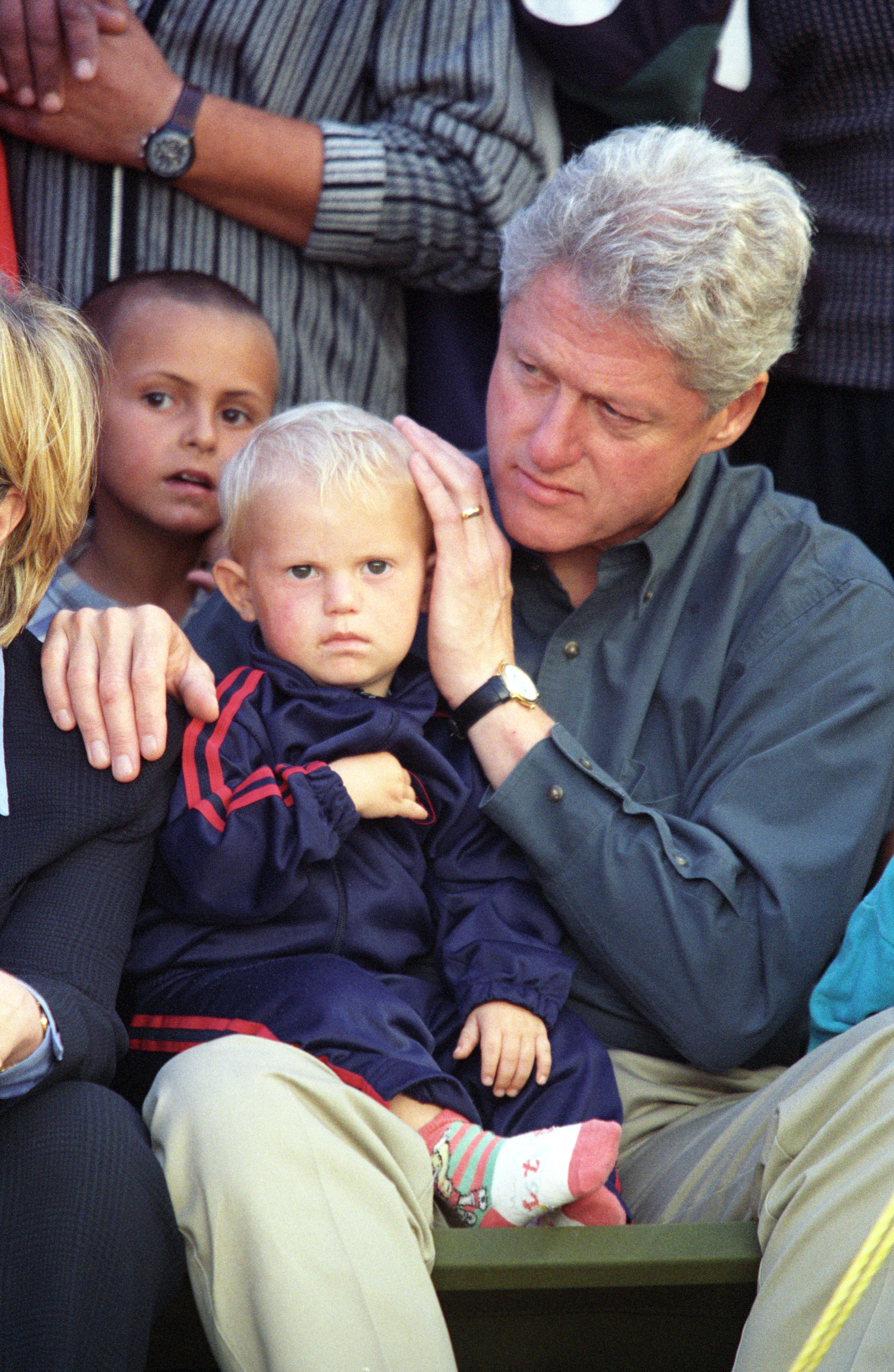
US President Bill Clinton with Albanian children during his visit to Kosovo, June 1999

On 10 June 1999, the UN Security Council passed UN Security Council Resolution 1244, which placed Kosovo under transitional UN administration (UNMIK) and authorised Kosovo Force (KFOR), a NATO-led peacekeeping force. Resolution 1244 provided that Kosovo would have autonomy within the Federal Republic of Yugoslavia, and affirmed the territorial integrity of Yugoslavia, which has been legally succeeded by the Republic of Serbia.

Estimates of the number of Serbs who left when Serbian forces left Kosovo vary from 65,000 to 250,000. Within post-conflict Kosovo Albanian society, calls for retaliation for previous violence done by Serb forces during the war circulated through public culture. Widespread attacks against Serbian cultural sites commenced following the conflict and the return of hundreds of thousands of Kosovo Albanian refugees to their homes. In 2004, prolonged negotiations over Kosovo's future status, sociopolitical problems and nationalist sentiments resulted in the Kosovo unrest. 11 Albanians and 16 Serbs were killed, 900 people (including peacekeepers) were injured, and several houses, public buildings and churches were damaged or destroyed.

International negotiations began in 2006 to determine the final status of Kosovo, as envisaged under UN Security Council Resolution 1244. The UN-backed talks, led by UN Special Envoy Martti Ahtisaari, began in February 2006. Whilst progress was made on technical matters, both parties remained diametrically opposed on the question of status itself.

In February 2007, Ahtisaari delivered a draft status settlement proposal to leaders in Belgrade and Pristina, the basis for a draft UN Security Council Resolution which proposed 'supervised independence' for the province. A draft resolution, backed by the United States, the United Kingdom, and other European members of the Security Council, was presented and rewritten four times to try to accommodate Russian concerns that such a resolution would undermine the principle of state sovereignty.

Russia, which holds a veto in the Security Council as one of five permanent members, had stated that it would not support any resolution which was not acceptable to both Belgrade and Kosovo Albanians. Whilst most observers had, at the beginning of the talks, anticipated independence as the most likely outcome, others have suggested that a rapid resolution might not be preferable.

After many weeks of discussions at the UN, the United States, United Kingdom and other European members of the Security Council formally 'discarded' a draft resolution backing Ahtisaari's proposal on 20 July 2007, having failed to secure Russian backing. Beginning in August, a "Troika" consisting of negotiators from the European Union (Wolfgang Ischinger), the United States (Frank G. Wisner) and Russia (Alexander Botsan-Kharchenko) launched a new effort to reach a status outcome acceptable to both Belgrade and Pristina. Despite Russian disapproval, the US, the UK, and France appeared likely to recognise Kosovar independence. A declaration of independence by Kosovar Albanian leaders was postponed until the end of the Serbian presidential elections (4 February 2008). A significant portion of politicians in both the EU and the US had feared that a premature declaration could boost support in Serbia for the nationalist candidate, Tomislav Nikolić.

In November 2001, the Organization for Security and Co-operation in Europe supervised the first elections for the Assembly of Kosovo. After that election, Kosovo's political parties formed an all-party unity coalition and elected Ibrahim Rugova as president and Bajram Rexhepi (PDK) as prime minister. After Kosovo-wide elections in October 2004, the LDK and AAK formed a new governing coalition that did not include PDK and Ora. This coalition agreement resulted in Ramush Haradinaj (AAK) becoming prime minister, while Ibrahim Rugova retained the position of president. PDK and Ora were critical of the coalition agreement and have since frequently accused that government of corruption.

Parliamentary elections were held on 17 November 2007. After early results, Hashim Thaçi who was on course to gain 35% of the vote, claimed victory for PDK, the Democratic Party of Kosovo, and stated his intention to declare independence. Thaçi formed a coalition with president Fatmir Sejdiu's Democratic League which was in second place with 22% of the vote. The turnout at the election was particularly low. Most members of the Serb minority refused to vote.

=== Declaration of independence ===
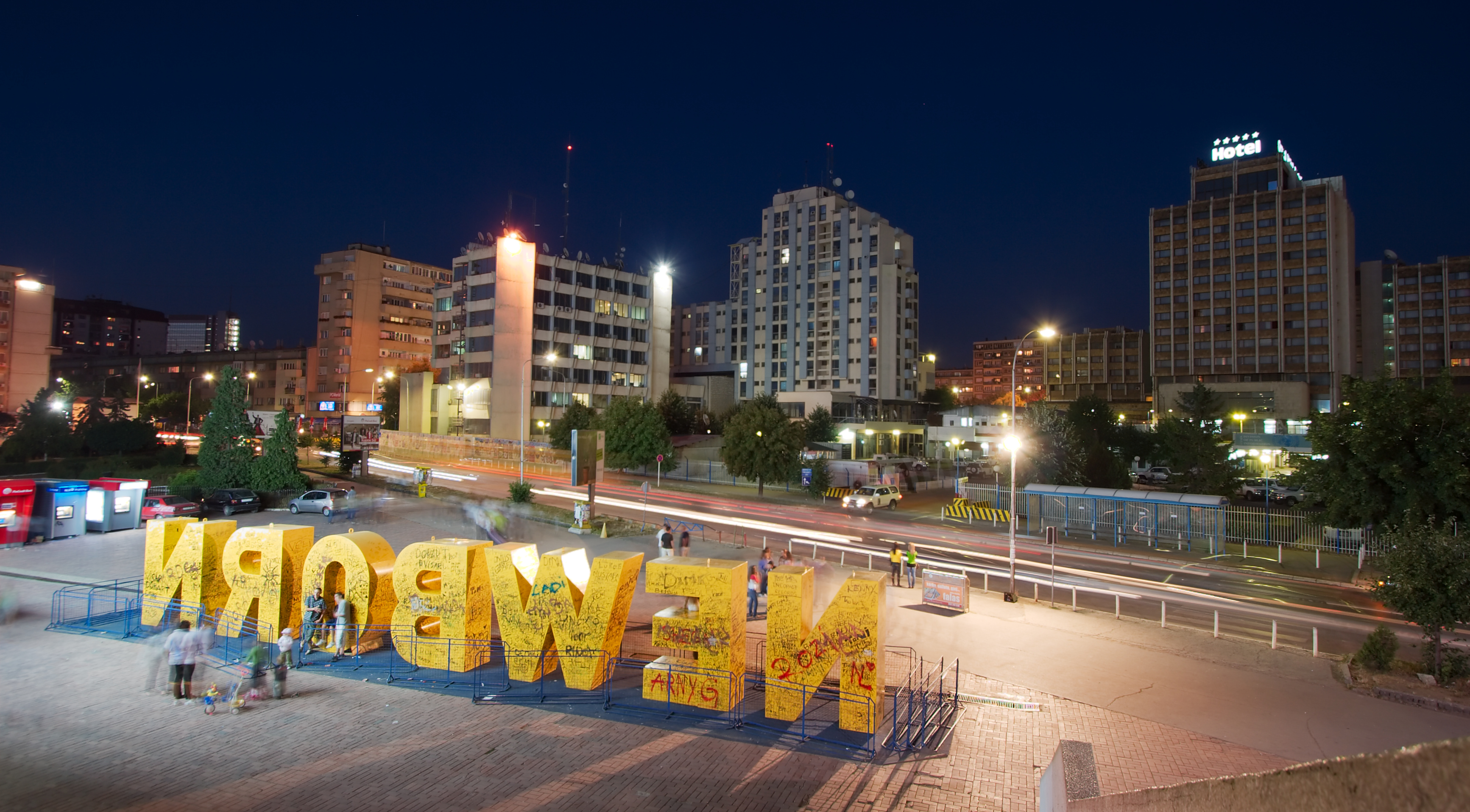
The Newborn monument was unveiled at the celebration of the 2008 Kosovo declaration of independence, proclaimed earlier that day, 17 February 2008, in Pristina.

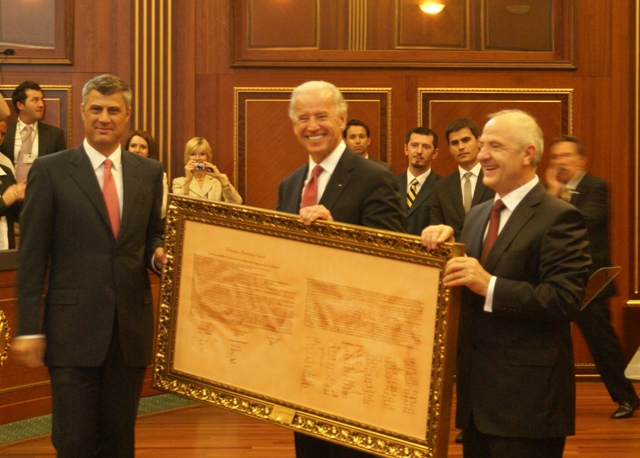
The prime minister of Kosovo, Hashim Thaçi, then-U.S. Vice President Joe Biden, and the president of Kosovo, Fatmir Sejdiu, with the Declaration of Independence of Kosovo

Kosovo declared independence from Serbia on 17 February 2008. As of 19 December 2025, 118 UN states recognised its independence, including all of its immediate neighbours, with the exception of Serbia; 10 states have subsequently withdrawn that recognition. Of the UN Security Council members, while the US, UK, and France do recognise Kosovo's independence, Russia and China do not. Since declaring independence, it has become a member of international institutions such as the International Monetary Fund and World Bank, though not of the United Nations.

The Serb minority of Kosovo, which largely opposed the declaration of independence, formed the Community Assembly of Kosovo and Metohija in response. The creation of the assembly was condemned by Kosovo's President Fatmir Sejdiu, while UNMIK has said the assembly is not a serious issue because it will not have an operative role.

On 8 October 2008, the UN General Assembly resolved, on a proposal by Serbia, to ask the International Court of Justice to render an advisory opinion on the legality of Kosovo's declaration of independence. The advisory opinion, which is not binding over decisions by states to recognise or not recognise Kosovo, was rendered on 22 July 2010, holding that Kosovo's declaration of independence was not in violation either of general principles of international law, which do not prohibit unilateral declarations of independence, nor of specific international law – in particular UNSCR 1244 – which did not define the final status process nor reserve the outcome to a decision of the Security Council.

Some rapprochement between the two governments took place on 19 April 2013 as both parties reached the Brussels Agreement, an agreement brokered by the EU that allowed the Serb minority in Kosovo to have its own police force and court of appeals. The agreement is yet to be ratified by either parliament. Presidents of Serbia and Kosovo organised two meetings, in Brussels on 27 February 2023 and Ohrid on 18 March 2023, to create and agree upon an 11-point agreement on implementing a European Union-backed deal to normalise ties between the two countries, which includes recognising "each other's documents such as passports and license plates".

A number of protests and demonstrations took place in Kosovo between 2021 and 2023, some of which involved weapons and resulted in deaths on both sides. Amongst the injured were 30 NATO peacekeepers. The main reason behind the 2022–23 demonstrations ended on 1 January 2024 when each country recognised each other's vehicle registration plates.

== Geography ==
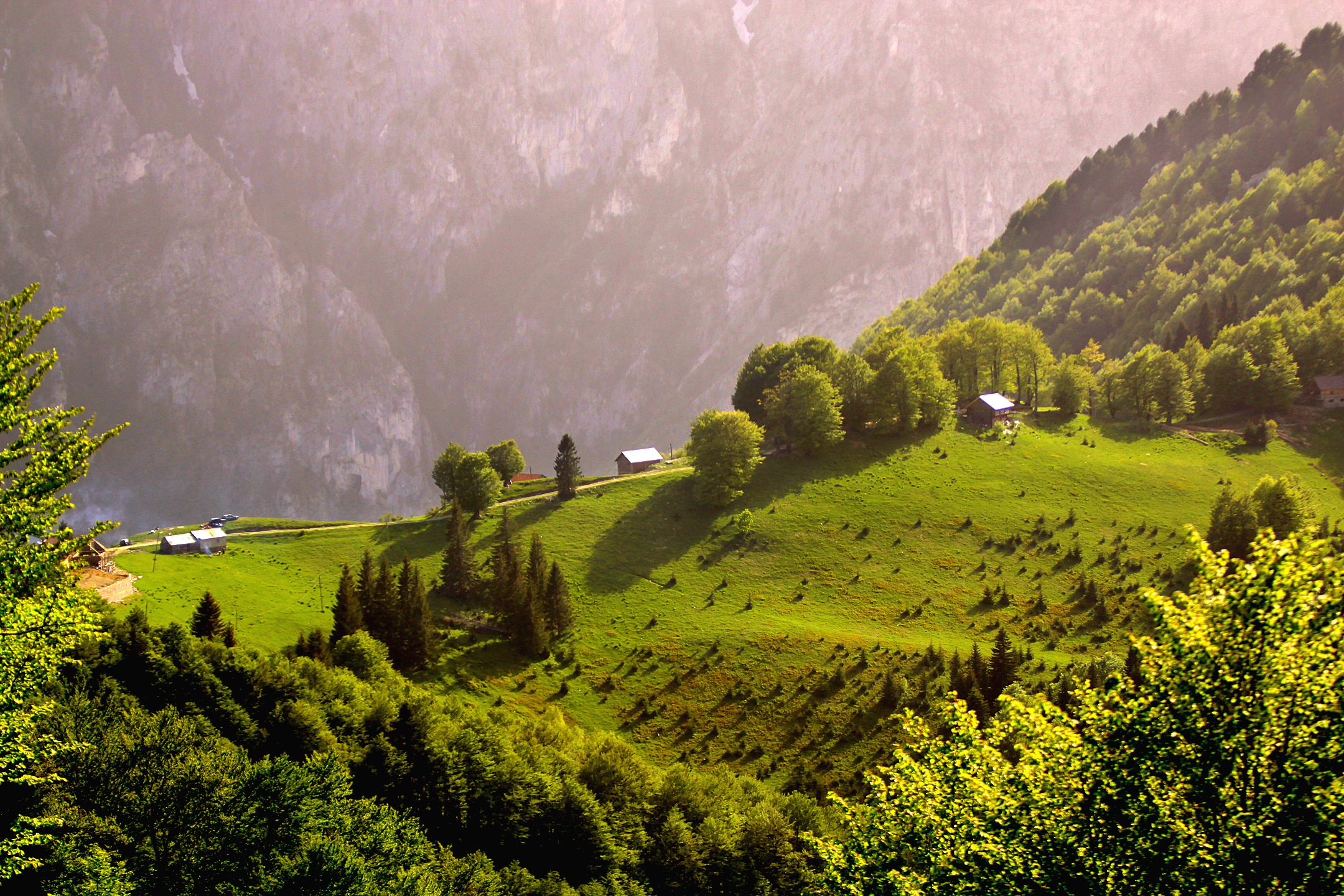
Landscape in Rugova within the Bjeshkët e Nemuna National Park bordering Albania

Defined in a total area of 10,887 km^{2} (4,203 sq mi), Kosovo is landlocked and located in the centre of Southeast Europe. It lies between latitudes 42° and 43° N, and longitudes 20° and 22° E. The northernmost point is Bellobërda at 43° 14' 06" northern latitude; the southernmost is Restelicë at 41° 56' 40" northern latitude; the westernmost point is Bogë at 20° 3' 23" eastern longitude; and the easternmost point is Desivojca at 21° 44' 21" eastern longitude. The highest point of Kosovo is Velika Rudoka at 2,660 m (8,730 ft), and the lowest is where the White Drin leaves Kosovo flowing into Albania at 297 m (974 ft).

Most of the borders of Kosovo are dominated by mountainous and high terrain. The most noticeable topographical features are the Accursed Mountains and the Šar Mountains. The Accursed Mountains are a geological continuation of the Dinaric Alps. The mountains run laterally through the west along the border with Albania and Montenegro. The southeast is predominantly the Šar Mountains, which constitute the border with North Macedonia. Besides the mountain ranges, Kosovo's territory consists mostly of two major plains, the Kosovo Plain in the east and the Metohija Plain in the west.

Additionally, Kosovo consists of multiple geographic and ethnographic regions, such as Anamorava, Drenica, Dushkaja, Gollak, Has, the Highlands of Gjakova, Llap, Llapusha, Reka e Keqe, Rugova and the Baran Valley.

Kosovo's hydrological resources are relatively small; there are few lakes in Kosovo, the largest of which are Batllava, Badovc, Gazivoda, and Radoniq. In addition to these, Kosovo also does have karst springs, thermal and mineral water springs. The longest river of Kosovo is the White Drin that flows for 122 km (76 mi) in Kosovo but other significant rivers are Sitnica, Lepenc, Ibar, and Llapi. Sitnica, a tributary of Ibar, is the largest river lying completely within Kosovo's territory. The Nerodime River represents Europe's only instance of a river bifurcation flowing into the Black Sea and Aegean Sea.

=== Climate ===
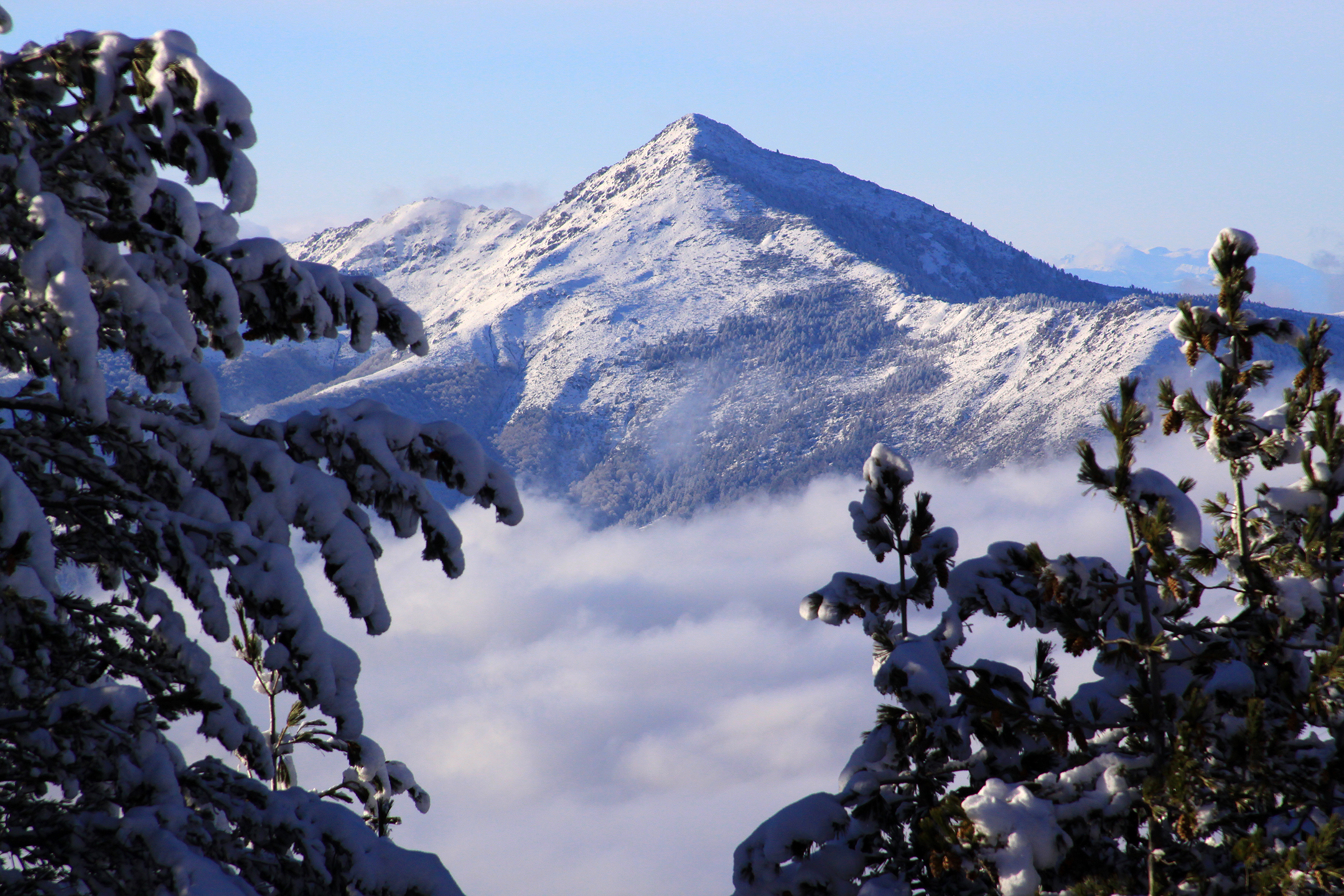
Alpine climate in Pashallora as seen from Brezovica

Most of Kosovo experiences predominantly a Continental climate with Mediterranean and Alpine influences, strongly influenced by Kosovo's proximity to the Adriatic Sea in the west, the Aegean Sea in the south as well as the European continental landmass in the north.

The coldest areas are in the mountainous region to the west and southeast, where an Alpine climate is prevalent. The warmest areas are mostly in the extreme southern areas close to the border with Albania, where a Mediterranean climate is the norm. Mean monthly temperature ranges between 0 °C (32 °F) (in January) and 22 °C (72 °F) (in July). Mean annual precipitation ranges from 600 to 1,300 mm (24 to 51 in) per year, and is well distributed year-round.

To the northeast, the Kosovo Plain and Ibar Valley are drier with total precipitation of about 600 millimetres (24 inches) per year and more influenced by continental air masses, with colder winters and very hot summers. In the southwest, climatic area of Metohija receives more Mediterranean influences with warmer summers, somewhat higher precipitation (700 mm (28 in)) and heavy snowfalls in the winter. The mountainous areas of the Accursed Mountains in the west, Šar Mountains on the south and Kopaonik in the north experiences alpine climate, with high precipitation (900 to 1,300 mm (35 to 51 in) per year), short and fresh summers, and cold winters. The average annual temperature of Kosovo is 9.5 °C (49.1 °F). The warmest month is July with average temperature of 19.2 °C (66.6 °F), and the coldest is January with −1.3 °C (29.7 °F). Except Prizren and Istog, all other meteorological stations in January recorded average temperatures under 0 °C (32 °F).

=== Biodiversity ===
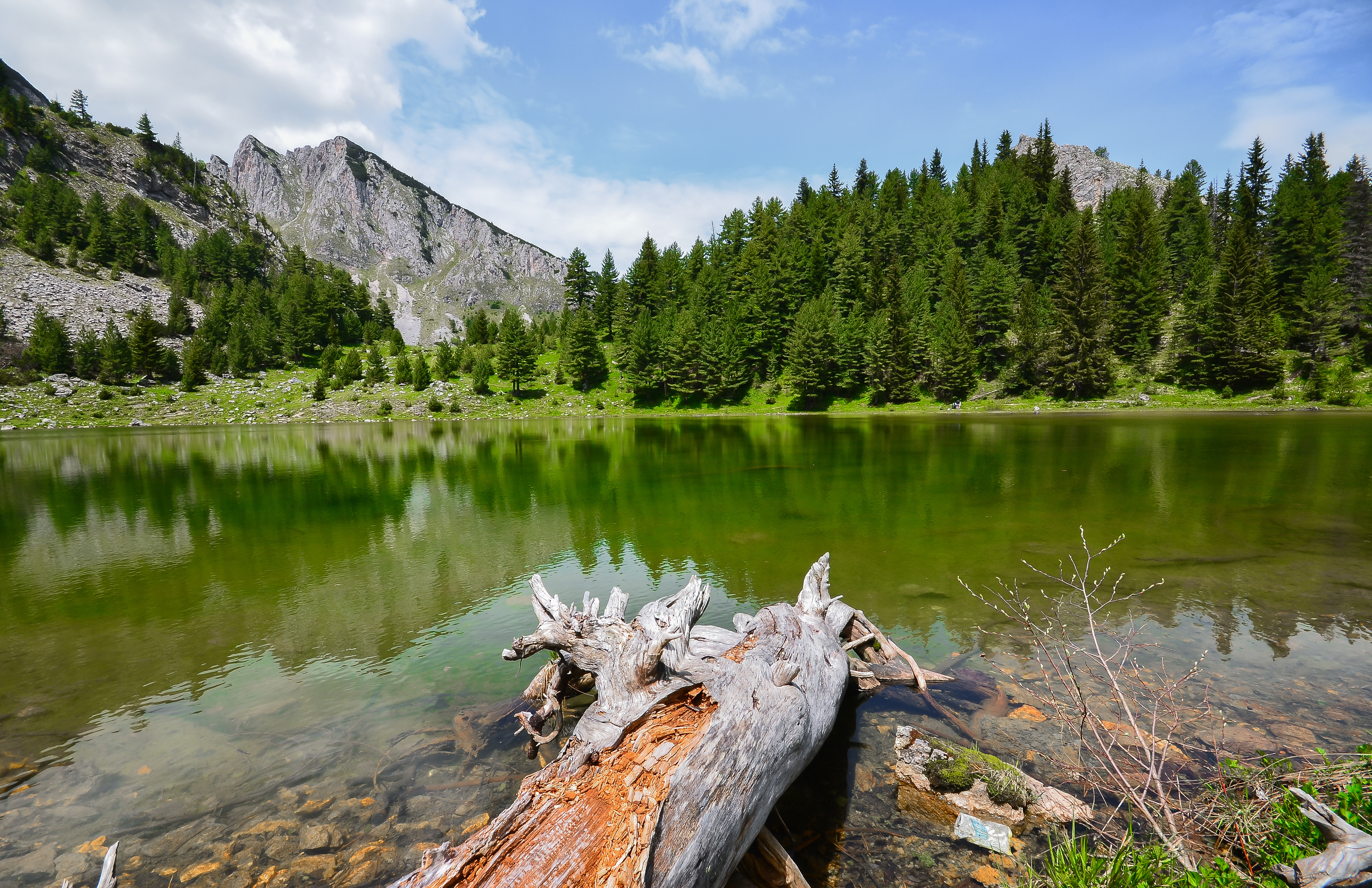
Bjeshkët e Nemuna National Park is home to a wide range of flora and fauna species.

Located in Southeast Europe, Kosovo has floral and faunal species from Europe and Eurasia. Forests are widespread in Kosovo and cover at least 39% of the region. Phytogeographically, it straddles the Illyrian province of the Circumboreal Region within the Boreal kingdom. In addition, it falls within three terrestrial ecoregions: Balkan mixed forests, Dinaric Mountains mixed forests, and Pindus Mountains mixed forests. Kosovo's biodiversity is conserved in two national parks, eleven nature reserves and one hundred three other protected areas. The Bjeshkët e Nemuna National Park and Sharr Mountains National Park are the most important regions of vegetation and biodiversity in Kosovo. Kosovo had a 2019 Forest Landscape Integrity Index mean score of 5.19/10, ranking it 107th globally out of 172 countries.

As of 2010, there were 1,800 recorded vascular plant species, with an expected actual number of 2,500 species. The diversity is the result of the complex interaction of geology and hydrology creating a wide variety of habitat conditions for flora growth. Although, Kosovo represents only 2.3% of the entire surface area of the Balkans, in terms of vegetation it has 25% of the Balkan flora and about 18% of the European flora. The fauna is composed of a wide range of species. The mountainous west and southeast provide a great habitat for several rare or endangered species, including brown bears, lynxes, wild cats, wolves, foxes, wild goats, roebucks, and deers. A total of 255 species of birds have been recorded, with raptors such as the golden eagle, eastern imperial eagle, and lesser kestrel living principally in the mountains of Kosovo.

=== Environmental issues ===
Environmental issues in Kosovo include a wide range of challenges pertaining to air and water pollution, climate change, waste management, biodiversity loss, and nature conservation. The vulnerability of the country to climate change is influenced by various factors, such as increased temperatures, geological and hydrological hazards, including droughts, flooding, fires and rains. Kosovo is not a signatory to the United Nations Framework Convention on Climate Change (UNFCCC), the Kyoto Protocol or the Paris Agreement. Consequently, the country is not mandated to submit a Nationally determined contribution (NDC) that are voluntary commitments outlining a nation's actions and strategies for mitigating climate change and adapting to its impacts. However, since 2021, Kosovo is actively engaged in the process of formulating a voluntary NDC, with assistance provided from Japan. In 2023, the country has established a goal of reducing greenhouse gas emissions by approximately 16.3% as part of its broader objective to achieve carbon neutrality by the year 2050.

== Government and politics ==
| Justina Shiroka Pula; President | Albin Kurti; Prime Minister |

Kosovo is a multi-party parliamentary representative democratic republic. It is governed by legislative, executive and judicial institutions, which derive from the constitution, although, until the Brussels Agreement, North Kosovo was in practice largely controlled by institutions of Serbia or parallel institutions funded by Serbia. Legislative functions are vested in both the Parliament and the ministers within their competencies. The Government exercises the executive power and is composed of the Prime Minister as the head of government, the Deputy Prime Ministers and the Ministers of the various ministries.

The judiciary is composed of the Supreme Court and subordinate courts, a Constitutional Court, and independent prosecutorial institutions. There also exist multiple independent institutions defined by the constitution and law, as well as local governments. All citizens are equal before the law and gender equality is ensured by the constitution. The Constitutional Framework guarantees a minimum of ten seats in the 120-member Assembly for Serbs, and ten for other minorities, and also guarantees Serbs and other minorities places in the Government.

The president serves as the head of state and represents the unity of the people of Kosovo, and is elected every five years by the Assembly in a secret ballot by a two-thirds majority of all deputies. The head of state is invested primarily with representative responsibilities and powers. The president has the power to return draft legislation to the parliament for reconsideration and has a role in foreign affairs and certain official appointments. The prime minister serves as the head of government elected by the parliament. Ministers are nominated by the prime minister, and then confirmed by the parliament. The head of government exercises executive power of the territory.

Corruption is a major problem and an obstacle to the development of democracy in the country. Those in the judiciary appointed by the government to fight corruption are often government associates. Moreover, prominent politicians and party operatives who commit offences are not prosecuted due to the lack of laws and political will. Organised crime also poses a threat to the economy due to the practices of bribery, extortion and racketeering.

=== Foreign relations ===
The foreign relations of Kosovo are conducted through the Ministry of Foreign Affairs in Pristina. As of 2025, 110 out of 193 United Nations member states recognise the Republic of Kosovo. Within the European Union, it is recognised by 22 of 27 members and is a potential candidate for the future enlargement of the European Union. On 15 December 2022 Kosovo filed a formal application to become a member of the European Union.

Kosovo is a member of several international organisations including the International Monetary Fund, World Bank, International Road and Transport Union, Regional Cooperation Council, Council of Europe Development Bank, Venice Commission, and European Bank for Reconstruction and Development. In 2015, Kosovo's bid to become a member of UNESCO fell three votes short of the two-thirds majority required to join. 23 countries maintain embassies in Kosovo. Kosovo maintains 24 diplomatic missions and 28 consular missions abroad.

Foreign relations with Albania are unique in that both countries share the same language and culture. The Albanian language is one of the official languages of Kosovo. Albania has an embassy in the capital Pristina and Kosovo an embassy in Tirana. In 1992, Albania was the only country whose parliament voted to recognise the Republic of Kosova. Albania was also one of the first countries to officially announce its recognition of the Republic of Kosovo in February 2008.

As of 1 January 2024, Kosovo nationals are exempt from visa requirements for stays of up to 90 days within any 180-day period in the Schengen Area.

=== Military ===
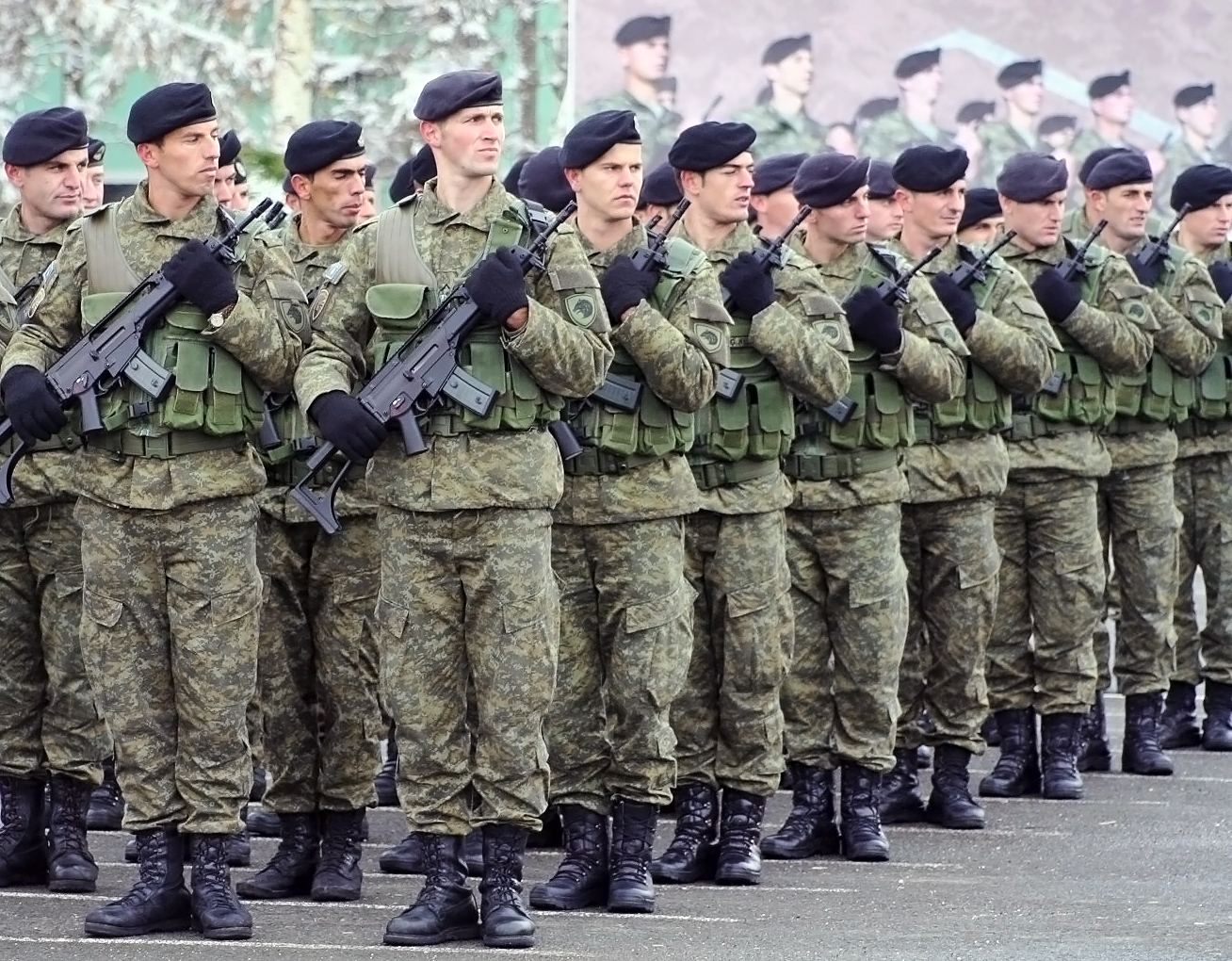
The Kosovo Security Force is the military of Kosovo.

The Kosovo Security Force (KSF) is the national security force of Kosovo commissioned with the task of preserving and safeguarding the country's territorial integrity, national sovereignty and the security interests of its population. Functioning under the president of Kosovo as the commander-in-chief, the security force adheres to the principle of non-discrimination, guaranteeing equal protection for its personnel regardless of gender or ethnicity. Kosovo's notable challenges are identified in the realms of persistent conflicts and societal safety and security, both of which are intertwined with the country's diplomatic ties to neighbouring countries and its domestic social and political stability.

The Kosovo Force (KFOR) is a NATO-led international peacekeeping force in Kosovo. Its operations are gradually reducing until Kosovo's Security Force, established in 2009, becomes self-sufficient. KFOR entered Kosovo on 12 June 1999, one day after the United Nations Security Council adopted the UNSC Resolution 1244. Camp Bondsteel is the operation headquarters of the KFOR in Kosovo. It is located near Ferizaj in southeastern Kosovo. It is the Regional Command-East headed by the United States Army (U.S. Army) and it is supported by troops from Greece, Italy, Finland, Hungary, Poland, Slovenia, Switzerland, and Turkey.

In 2008, under the leadership of NATO, the KFOR and the Kosovo Protection Corps (KPC) undertook preparations for the formation of the Kosovo Security Force. A significant milestone occurred in 2014 when the government officially announced its decision to establish a Ministry of Defence by 2019, with the aim of transforming the existing Kosovo Security Force into the Kosovo Armed Forces. This transformation would entail aligning the armed forces with the high standards expected of NATO members, reflecting Kosovo's aspiration to join the alliance in the future. Subsequently, in December 2018, the government enacted legislation to redefine the mandate of the Kosovo Security Force, effecting its transformation into an army. Concurrently, the establishment of a Ministry of Defence was set in motion, further solidifying these developments and ensuring the necessary infrastructure and oversight for the newly formed armed forces.

In 2023, the Kosovo Security Force had over 5,000 active members, using vehicles and weapons acquired from a number of NATO countries. KFOR continues to operate in Kosovo under its UN mandate.

=== Law ===
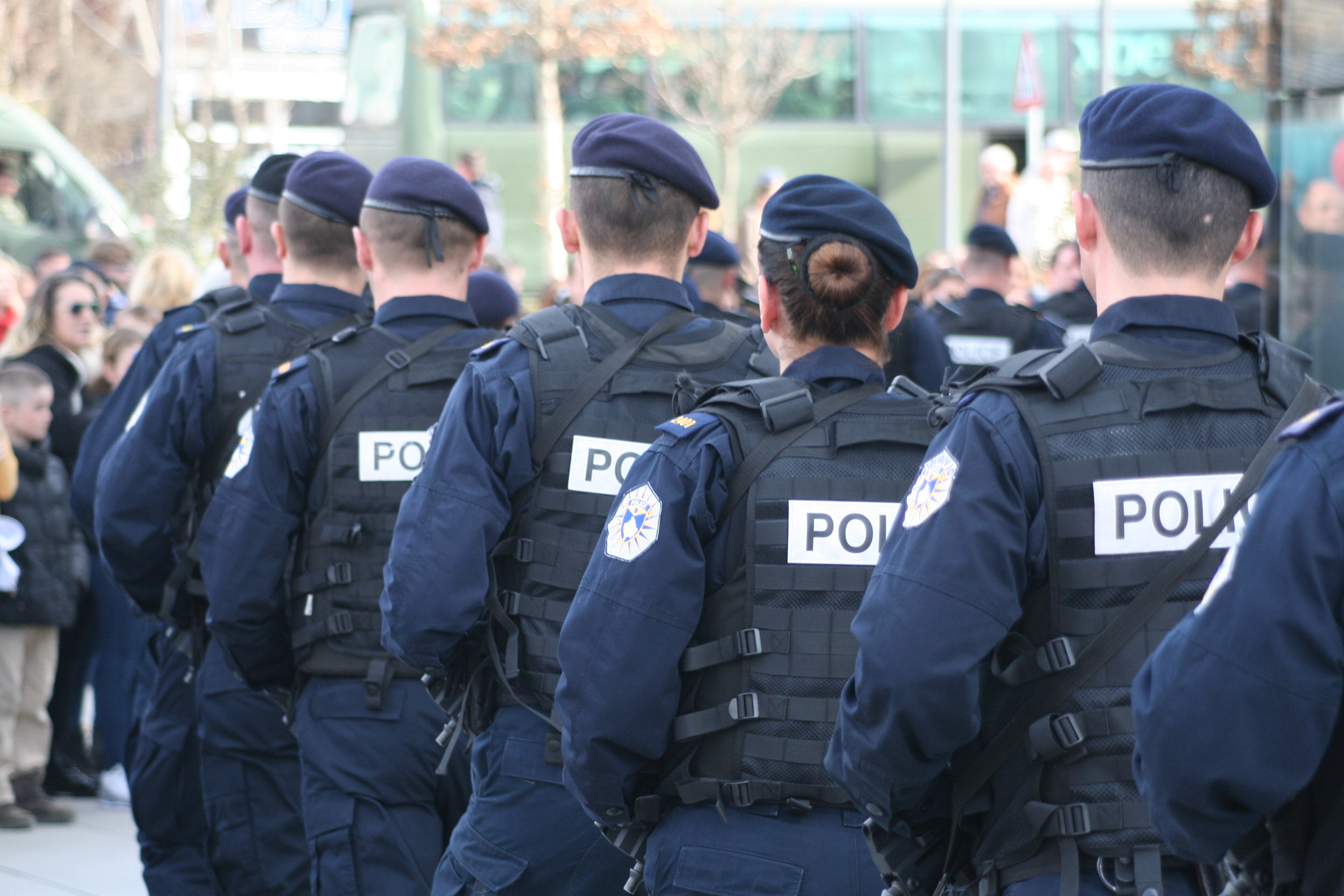
The Kosovo Police is the main law enforcement agency in Kosovo.

The judicial system of Kosovo follows a civil law framework and comprises regular civil and criminal courts, alongside administrative courts. Administered by the judicial council in Pristina, the system includes the supreme court as the highest judicial authority, a constitutional court and an independent prosecutorial institution. Following the independence of Kosovo in 2008, the Kosovo Police assumed the primary law enforcement responsibilities within the country.

Covering a broad range of issues related to the status of Kosovo, the Ahtisaari Plan introduced two forms of international supervision for Kosovo following its independence, including the International Civilian Office (ICO) and the European Union Rule of Law Mission to Kosovo (EULEX). The ICO monitored plan implementation and possessed veto powers, while EULEX focused on developing judicial systems and had arrest and prosecution authority. These bodies were granted powers under Kosovo's declaration of independence and constitution.

The legal status of the ICO depended upon the de facto situation and Kosovo legislation, with oversight provided by the International Steering Group (ISG) comprising states that recognised Kosovo. Serbia and non-recognising states did not acknowledge the ICO. Despite initial opposition, EULEX gained acceptance from Serbia and the UN Security Council in 2008. It operated under the UNMIK mandate with operational independence. The ICO concluded operations in 2012 after fulfilling obligations, while EULEX continues to operate within Kosovo and international law. Its role has been extended, primarily focusing on monitoring with reduced responsibilities.

The Global Safety Report by Gallup, which assesses personal security worldwide through the Law and Order Index Scores for 2023, includes Kosovo among the top ten countries globally in terms of perceived safety and law enforcement effectiveness.

=== Administrative divisions ===
Based on the United Nations Interim Administration Mission in Kosovo (UNMIK), Kosovo is divided into seven districts (Albanian: rajon; okrug) or administrative regions. The districts are further subdivided into 38 municipalities (Albanian: komunë; Serbian: opština). The largest and most populous district of Kosovo is the District of Pristina with the capital in Pristina, having a surface area of 2,470 km^{2} (953.67 sq mi) and a population of 511,307.

| Districts | Seat | Area (km^{2}) | Population (2024) |
|---|---|---|---|
| District of Peja | Peja | 1,365 | 146,256 |
| District of Mitrovica | Mitrovica | 2,077 | 173,642 |
| District of Pristina | Pristina | 2,470 | 511,307 |
| District of Gjilan | Gjilan | 1,206 | 150,176 |
| District of Gjakova | Gjakova | 1,129 | 152,216 |
| District of Prizren | Prizren | 1,397 | 271,386 |
| District of Ferizaj | Ferizaj | 1,030 | 180,583 |

== Demographics ==
According to the most recent census in 2024 by the Kosovo Agency of Statistics, Kosovo's population is 1,585,566. In 2023, the overall life expectancy at birth is 79.68 years; 77.38 years for males and 81.87 years for females. The estimated total fertility rate in 2023 is 1.88 children born per woman. The country is the 11th most populous country in the Southeastern Europe (Balkans) and ranks as the 152nd most populous country in the world. The country's population rose steadily over the 20th century and peaked at an estimated 2.2 million in 1998. The Kosovo War and subsequent migration have decreased the population of Kosovo over time.

Relations between Kosovo Albanians and Kosovo Serbs have been hostile since the rise of nationalism in the Balkans during the 19th century. During Communism in Yugoslavia, the ethnic Albanians and Serbs were strongly irreconcilable, with sociological studies during the Tito-era indicating that ethnic Albanians and Serbs rarely accepted each other as neighbours or friends and few held inter-ethnic marriages. Ethnic prejudices, stereotypes and mutual distrust between ethnic Albanians and Serbs have remained common for decades. The level of intolerance and separation between both communities during the Tito-period was reported by sociologists to be worse than that of Croat and Serb communities in Yugoslavia, which also had tensions but held some closer relations between each other.

Despite their planned integration into Kosovar society and their recognition in the Kosovar constitution, the Romani, Ashkali, and Egyptian communities continue to face many difficulties, such as segregation and discrimination in housing, education, health, employment and social welfare. Many camps around Kosovo continue to house thousands of internally displaced people, all of whom are from minority groups and communities. Because many of the Roma are believed to have sided with the Serbs during the conflict, taking part in the widespread looting and destruction of Albanian property, Minority Rights Group International report that Romani people encounter hostility by Albanians outside their local areas. A 2020 research report funded by the EU shows that there is a limited scale of trust and overall contact between the major ethnic groups in Kosovo.

According to the World Happiness Report 2024, which evaluates the happiness levels of citizens in various countries, Kosovo is currently ranked 29th among a total of 143 nations assessed, compared with neighbours Serbia ranked 37th, Montenegro 76th, North Macedonia 84th and Albania 87th.

Largest municipalities by population (2024)
| Pristina Prizren | Rank | Municipality | Population | Rank | Municipality | Population | Ferizaj Peja |
|---|---|---|---|---|---|---|---|
| Pristina Prizren | 1 | Pristina | 227,154 | 11 | Lipjan | 54,974 | Ferizaj Peja |
| Pristina Prizren | 2 | Prizren | 147,428 | 12 | Drenas | 48,054 | Ferizaj Peja |
| Pristina Prizren | 3 | Ferizaj | 109,345 | 13 | Suharekë | 45,713 | Ferizaj Peja |
| Pristina Prizren | 4 | Gjilan | 82,901 | 14 | Malisheva | 43,871 | Ferizaj Peja |
| Pristina Prizren | 5 | Peja | 82,661 | 15 | Rahovec | 41,777 | Ferizaj Peja |
| Pristina Prizren | 6 | Gjakova | 78,824 | 16 | Skenderaj | 40,632 | Ferizaj Peja |
| Pristina Prizren | 7 | Podujevë | 71,018 | 17 | Viti | 35,549 | Ferizaj Peja |
| Pristina Prizren | 8 | Mitrovica | 64,680 | 18 | Istog | 33,066 | Ferizaj Peja |
| Pristina Prizren | 9 | Kosovo Polje | 64,078 | 19 | Klina | 30,574 | Ferizaj Peja |
| Pristina Prizren | 10 | Vushtrri | 61,493 | 20 | Dragash | 28,908 | Ferizaj Peja |

=== Ethnicity ===
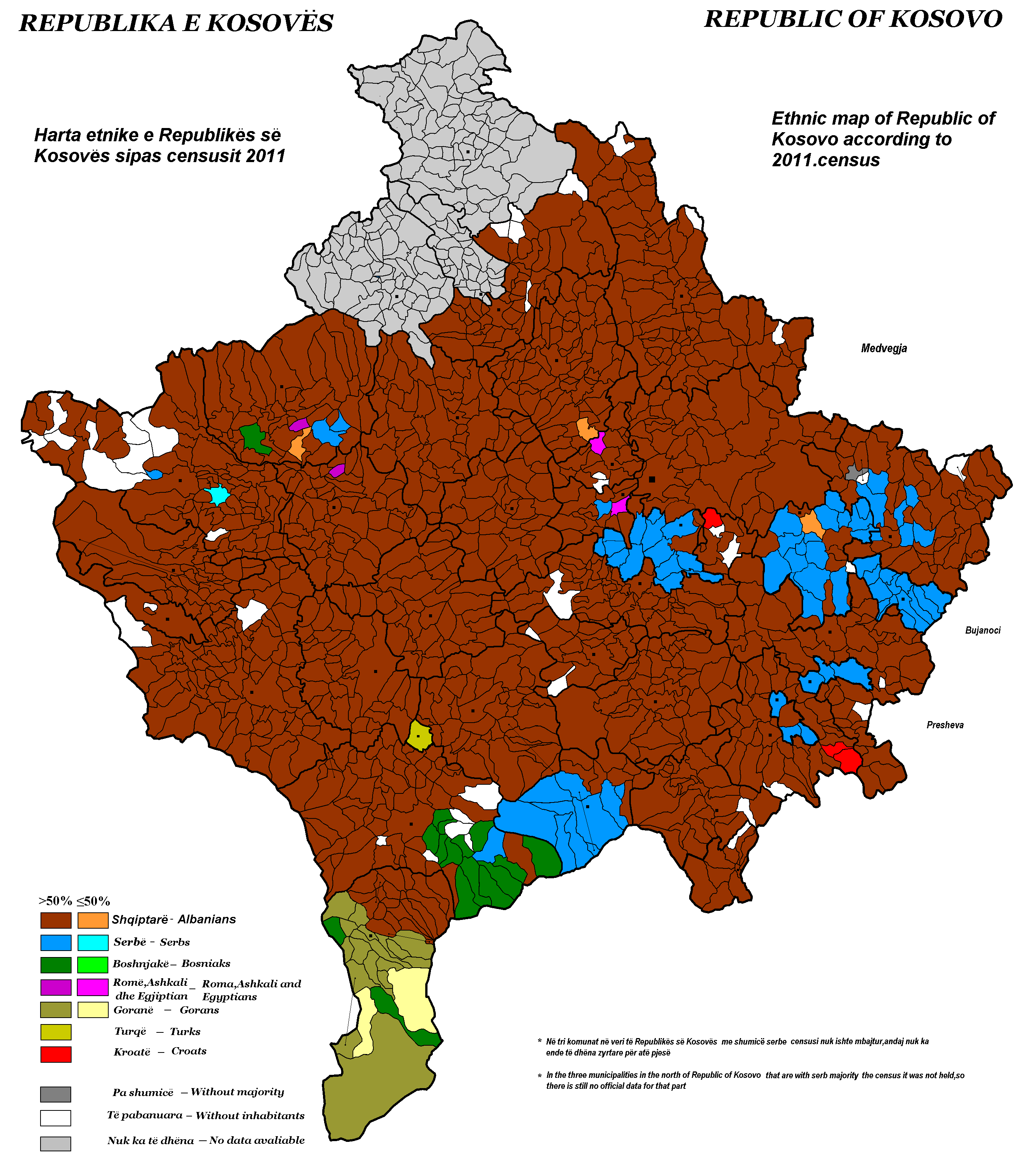
Distribution of ethnic groups within Kosovo, as of the 2011 census

Kosovo is a fairly ethnically homogeneous country. In 2024, Albanians constituted around 92% of the population of Kosovo, followed by ethnic Serbs (2.3%), Bosniaks (1.7%), Ashkali and Balkan Egyptians (1.7%), Turks (1.2%), Romani (<1%), and the Gorani (<1%). Ethnic Serbs are concentrated in the north of the country, as well as in other municipalities in the east of the country, such as Gračanica and Štrpce. Turks form a local majority in the municipality of Mamusha, just north of Prizren, while the Bosniaks are mainly located within Prizren itself. The Gorani are concentrated in the southernmost tip of the country, in Dragash. The Romani are spread across the entire country.

=== Languages ===
Native languages among the Population, according to the 2024 census:
1. Albanian (92.7%)
2. Serbian (3.40%)
3. Bosnian (1.80%)
4. Turkish (1.20%)
5. Other (0.90%)

In Kosovo, Albanian and Serbian are the official languages at the national level, but Albanian is the predominant language in Kosovo, spoken by over 92% of the population. Its standard written form is a blend of the two main dialects, Gheg and Tosk, although the spoken form predominantly is the Gheg dialect. Turkish holds official language status in the Municipality of Prizren, regardless of the size of the Turkish-speaking population. At the municipal level, Turkish, Bosnian, and Romani may also be granted official status when a linguistic community constitutes at least 5% of the local population. This multilingual policy aims to protect the rights of minority language speakers and also promote inclusion of the communities.

=== Religion ===
Religion in Kosovo
| Muslim | 93.5% |
| Christian | 4.1% |
| – Eastern Orthodox | 2.3% |
| – Roman Catholic | 1.8% |
| Other | 0.5% |
| Non-religious | 0.5% |
| Undeclared | 1.5% |

Kosovo is a secular state with no state religion; freedom of belief, conscience and religion is explicitly guaranteed in the Constitution of Kosovo. Kosovo's society is strongly secularised and is ranked first in Southern Europe and ninth in the world as free and equal for tolerance towards religion and atheism.

In the 2024 census, 93.5% of the population of Kosovo were Sunni Muslims, 2.3% were Eastern Orthodox and 1.8% Roman Catholics. Additionally, 0.5% of population reported affiliation with other religions, 0.5% stated they have no religious belief, and 1.5% chose not to disclose their religious affiliation. Protestants, although recognised as a religious group in Kosovo by the government, were not represented in the census.

Islam is the most widely practiced religion in Kosovo and was introduced in the Middle Ages by the Ottomans. Today, Kosovo has the second-highest number of Muslims as a percentage of its population in Europe after Turkey. The majority of the Muslim population of Kosovo are ethnic Albanians, Turks, and Slavs such as Gorani and Bosniaks.

Members of the Roman Catholic Church are predominantly Albanians while ethnic Serbs mainly belong to the Eastern Orthodox Church. In 2008, Protestant pastor Artur Krasniqi, primate of the Kosovo Protestant Evangelical Church, claimed that "as many as 15,000" Kosovar Albanians had converted to Protestantism since 1985.

In general, Kosovo Albanians define their ethnicity by language and not by religion, while religion reflects a distinguishing identity feature among Kosovo Serbs.

=== Education ===
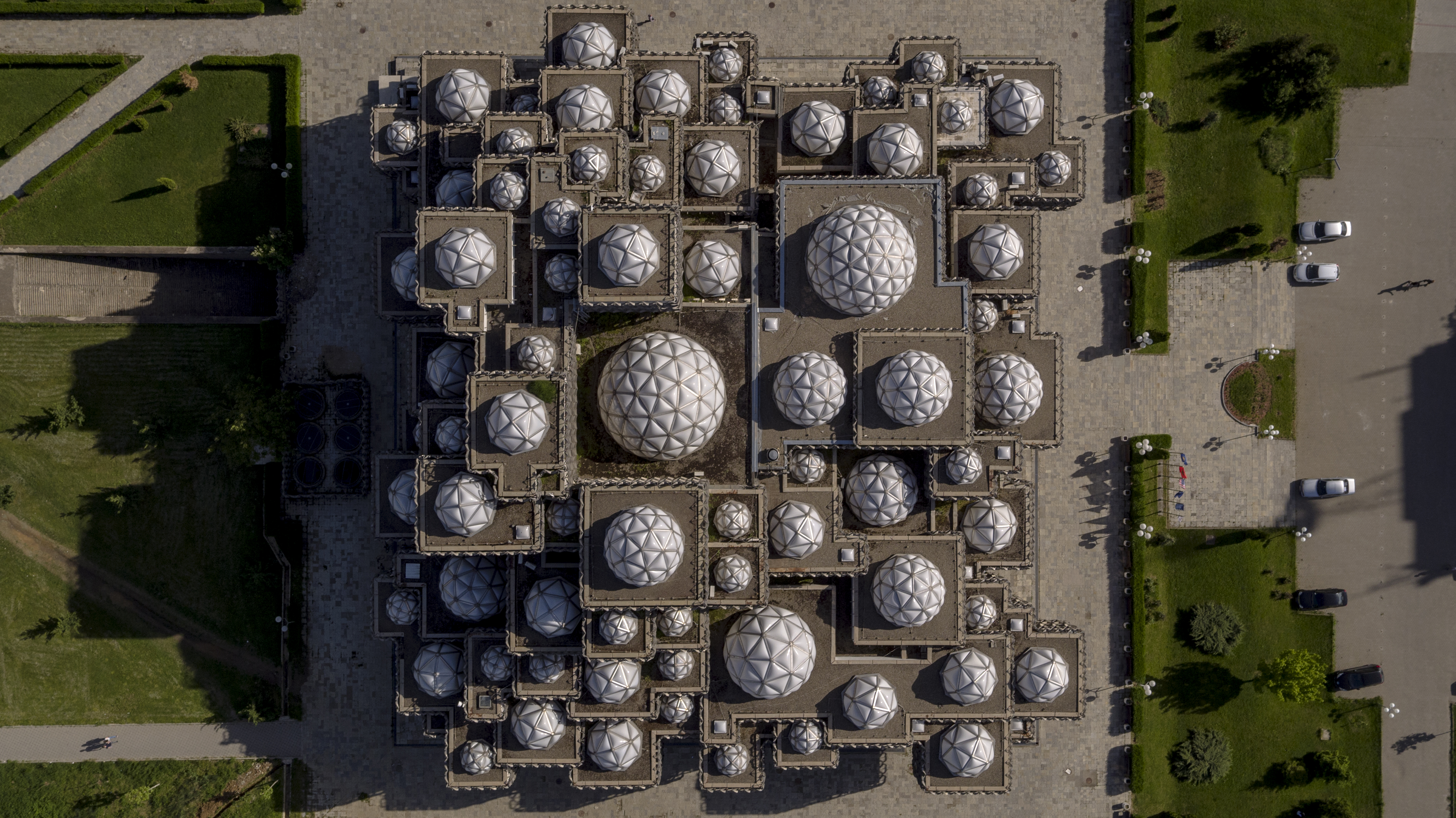
The National Library of Kosovo

Education for primary, secondary, and tertiary levels is predominantly public and supported by the state, run by the Ministry of Education. Education takes place in two main stages: primary and secondary education, and higher education.

The primary and secondary education is subdivided into four stages: preschool education, primary and low secondary education, high secondary education and special education. Preschool education is for children from the ages of one to five. Primary and secondary education is obligatory for everyone. It is provided by gymnasiums and vocational schools and also available in languages of recognised minorities in Kosovo, where classes are held in Albanian, Serbian, Bosnian, Turkish and Croatian. The first phase (primary education) includes grades one to five, and the second phase (low secondary education) grades six to nine. The third phase (high secondary education) consists of general education but also professional education, which is focused on different fields. It lasts four years. However, pupils are offered possibilities of applying for higher or university studies. According to the Ministry of Education, children who are not able to get a general education are able to get a special education (fifth phase).

Higher education can be received in universities and other higher-education institutes. These educational institutions offer studies for Bachelor, Master and PhD degrees. The students may choose full-time or part-time studies.

Students from Kosovo performed very poorly on several PISA tests, and this result has sparked debates about the education system.

=== Health ===
In the past, Kosovo's capabilities to develop a modern health care system were limited. Low GDP during 1990 worsened the situation even more. However, the establishment of Faculty of Medicine in the University of Pristina marked a significant development in health care. This was also followed by launching different health clinics which enabled better conditions for professional development.

The health care system in Kosovo is now more developed, and is organised into three sectors: primary, secondary and tertiary health care. Primary health care in Pristina is organised into thirteen family medicine centres and fifteen ambulatory care units. Secondary health care is decentralised in seven regional hospitals. Pristina does not have any regional hospital and instead uses University Clinical Centre of Kosovo for health care services. University Clinical Centre of Kosovo provides its health care services in twelve clinics, where 642 doctors are employed. At a lower level, home services are provided for several vulnerable groups which are not able to reach health care premises. Kosovo health care services are now focused on patient safety, quality control and assisted health.

== Economy ==
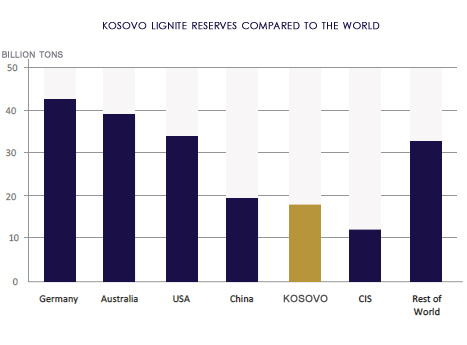
Kosovo has the fifth-largest lignite reserves in the world.

The economy of Kosovo is a transitional economy. It suffered from the combined results of political upheaval, the Serbian dismissal of Kosovo employees and the following Yugoslav Wars. Despite declining foreign assistance, the GDP has mostly grown since its declaration of independence. This was despite the 2008 financial crisis and the subsequent European debt crisis. Additionally, the inflation rate has been low. Most economic development has taken place in the trade, retail and construction sectors. Kosovo is highly dependent on remittances from the diaspora, foreign direct investment, and other capital inflows. In 2018, the International Monetary Fund reported that approximately one-sixth of the population lived below the poverty line and one-third of the working age population was unemployed, the highest rate in Europe.

Kosovo's largest trading partners are Albania, Italy, Switzerland, China, Germany and Turkey. The euro is its official currency. The Government of Kosovo has signed free-trade agreements with Albania, Croatia, Bosnia and Herzegovina and North Macedonia. Kosovo is a member of CEFTA, agreed with UNMIK, and enjoys free trade with most nearby non-European Union countries.

Kosovo is dominated by the services sector, accounting for 54% of GDP and employing approximately 56.6% of the population. The industry accounted for 37.3% of GDP and employs roughly 24.8% of the labour force. There are several reasons for the stagnation, ranging from consecutive occupations, political turmoil and the War in Kosovo in 1999. While agriculture accounts for only 6.6% of GDP, albeit an increase of 0.5 percentage points from 2019, it forms 18.7% of Kosovo's workforce, the highest proportion of agricultural employment in the region after Albania.

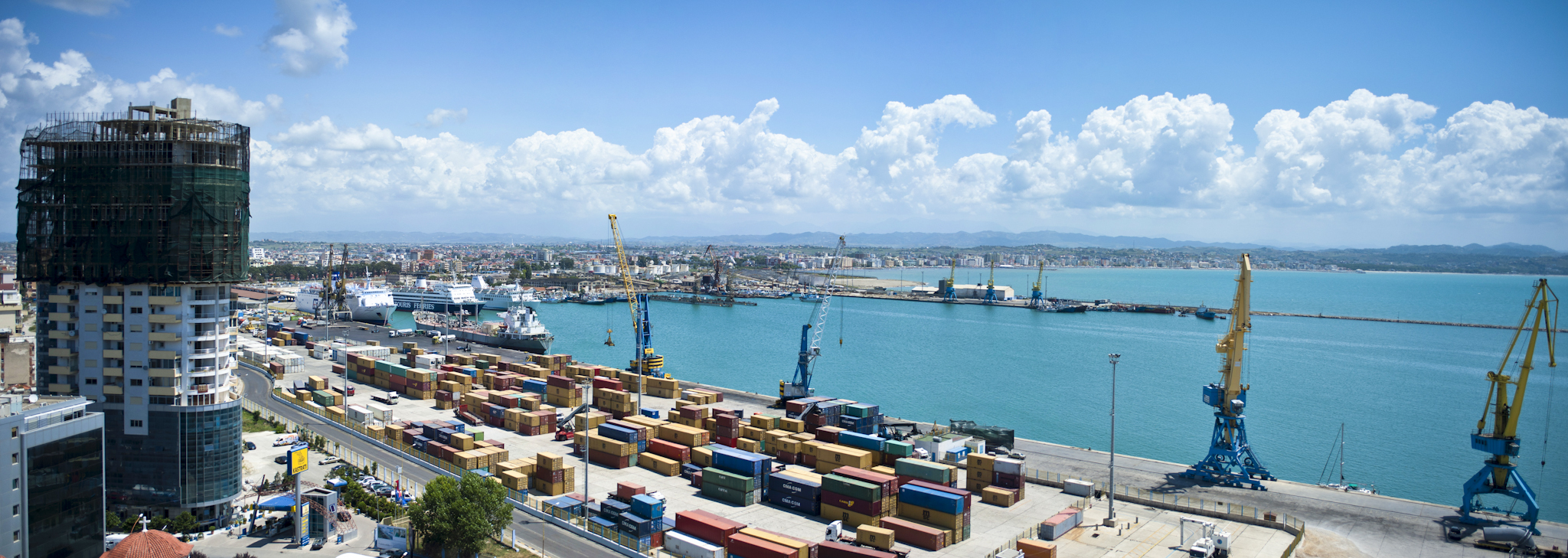
Since 2019, the Port of Durrës in Albania on the Adriatic Sea is facilitating customs processes for cargo heading to Kosovo. A dedicated customs office for Kosovo also operates within the port facilities.

Kosovo has large reserves of lead, zinc, silver, nickel, cobalt, copper, iron and bauxite. The nation has the fifth-largest lignite reserves in the world and the third in Europe. As of 2005, the Directorate for Mines and Minerals and the World Bank estimated that Kosovo had €13.5 billion worth of minerals. The primary sector is based on small to medium-sized family-owned dispersed units. 53% of the nation's area is agricultural land, 41% forest and forestry land, and 6% for others.

Wine has historically been produced in Kosovo. The main heartland of Kosovo's wine industry is in Rahovec. The main cultivars include Pinot noir, Merlot, and Chardonnay. Kosovo exports wines to Germany and the United States. The four state-owned wine production facilities were not as much "wineries" as they were "wine factories". Only the Rahovec facility that held approximately 36% of the total vineyard area had the capacity of around 50 million litres annually. The major share of the wine production was intended for exports. At its peak in 1989, the exports from the Rahovec facility amounted to 40 million litres and were mainly distributed to the German market.

=== Energy ===
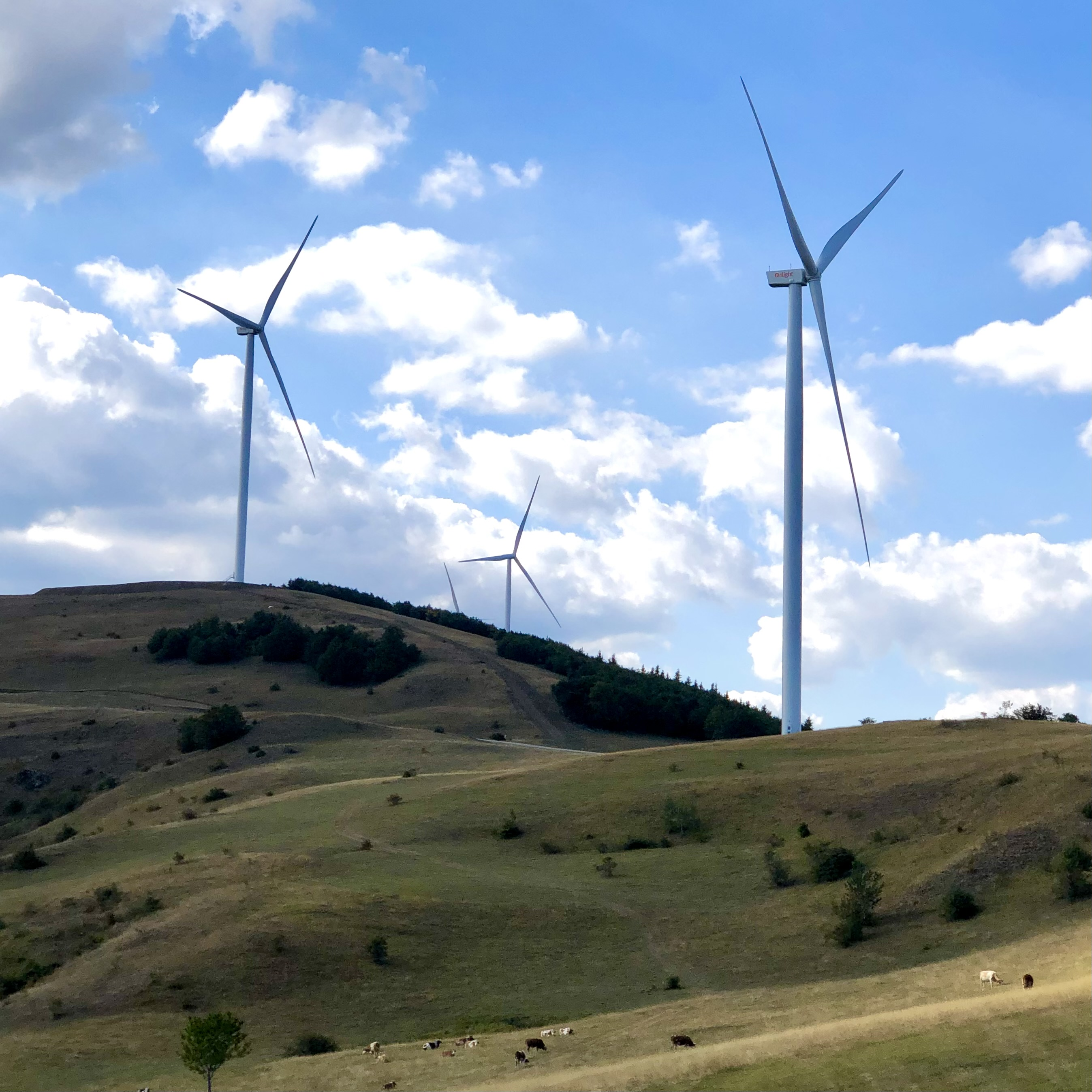
Bajgora Wind Farm, the largest wind farm in Kosovo

The electricity sector in Kosovo is considered one of the sectors with the greatest potential of development. Kosovo's electricity sector is highly dependent on coal-fired power plants, which use the abundant lignite, so efforts are being made to diversify electricity generation with more renewables sources, such as wind farms in Bajgora and Kitka.

In December 2019, Kosovo and Albania's energy transmission operators signed an agreement to establish a joint energy bloc between the two countries. This would allow Albania and Kosovo to exchange energy reserves, which was expected to result in €4 million in savings per year for Kosovo.

=== Tourism ===
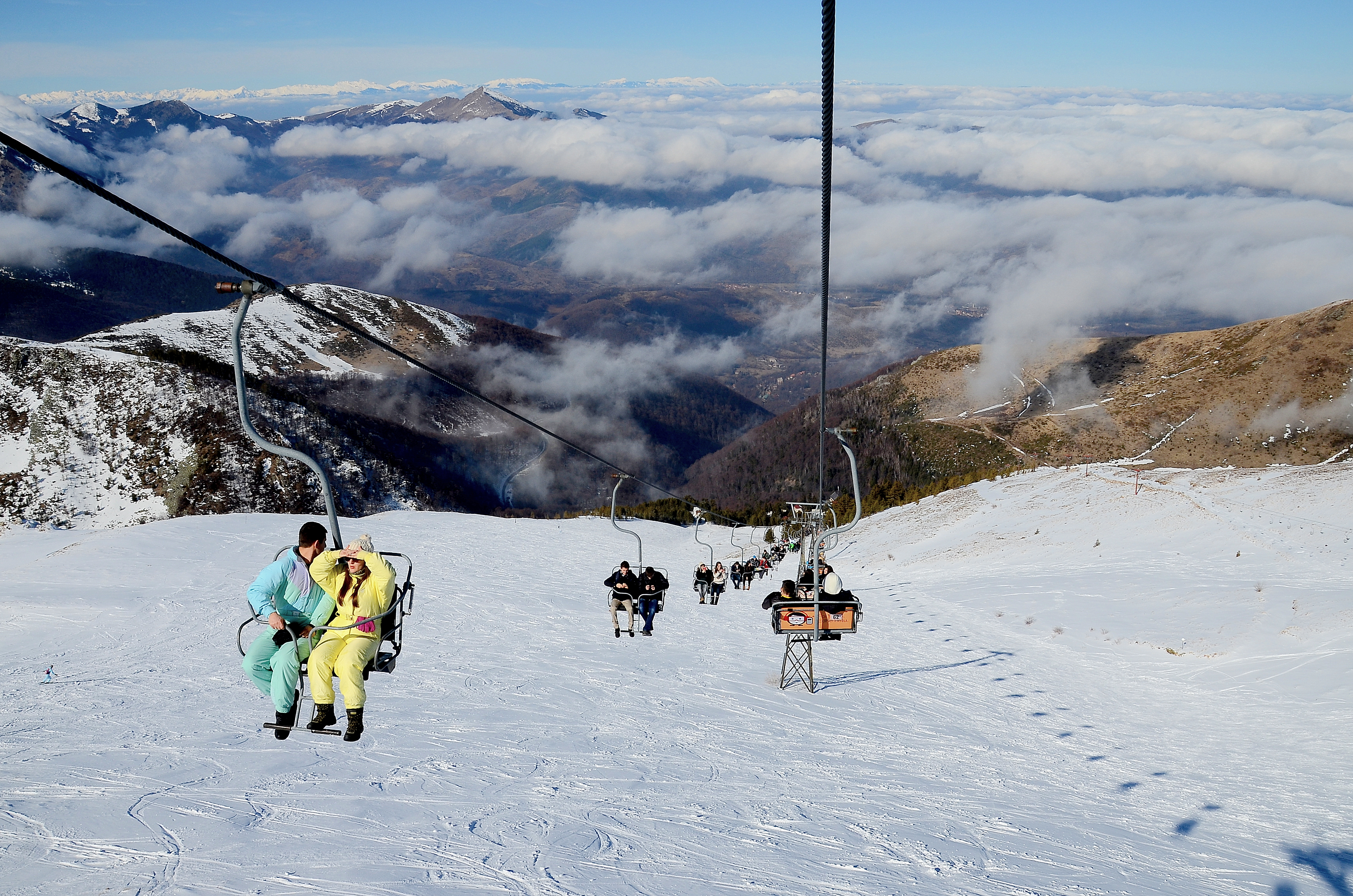
Brezovica ski resort is a popular destination for winter tourism in Kosovo.

Kosovo is rich in various topographical features, including high mountains, lakes, canyons, steep rock formations and rivers. The mountainous west and southeast of Kosovo have potential for winter tourism, and skiing takes place at the Brezovica ski resort within the Šar Mountains, with close proximity to the Pristina Airport (60 km) and Skopje International Airport (70 km).

Kosovo also has lakes like Batllava that serves as a popular destination for watersports, camping, and swimming. Other lakes include Ujmani, Liqenati, Zemra.

Other major attractions include the capital of Pristina; the historical cities of Prizren, Peja and Gjakova; and Ferizaj and Gjilan.

The New York Times included Kosovo on the list of 41 places to visit in 2011.

=== Transport ===
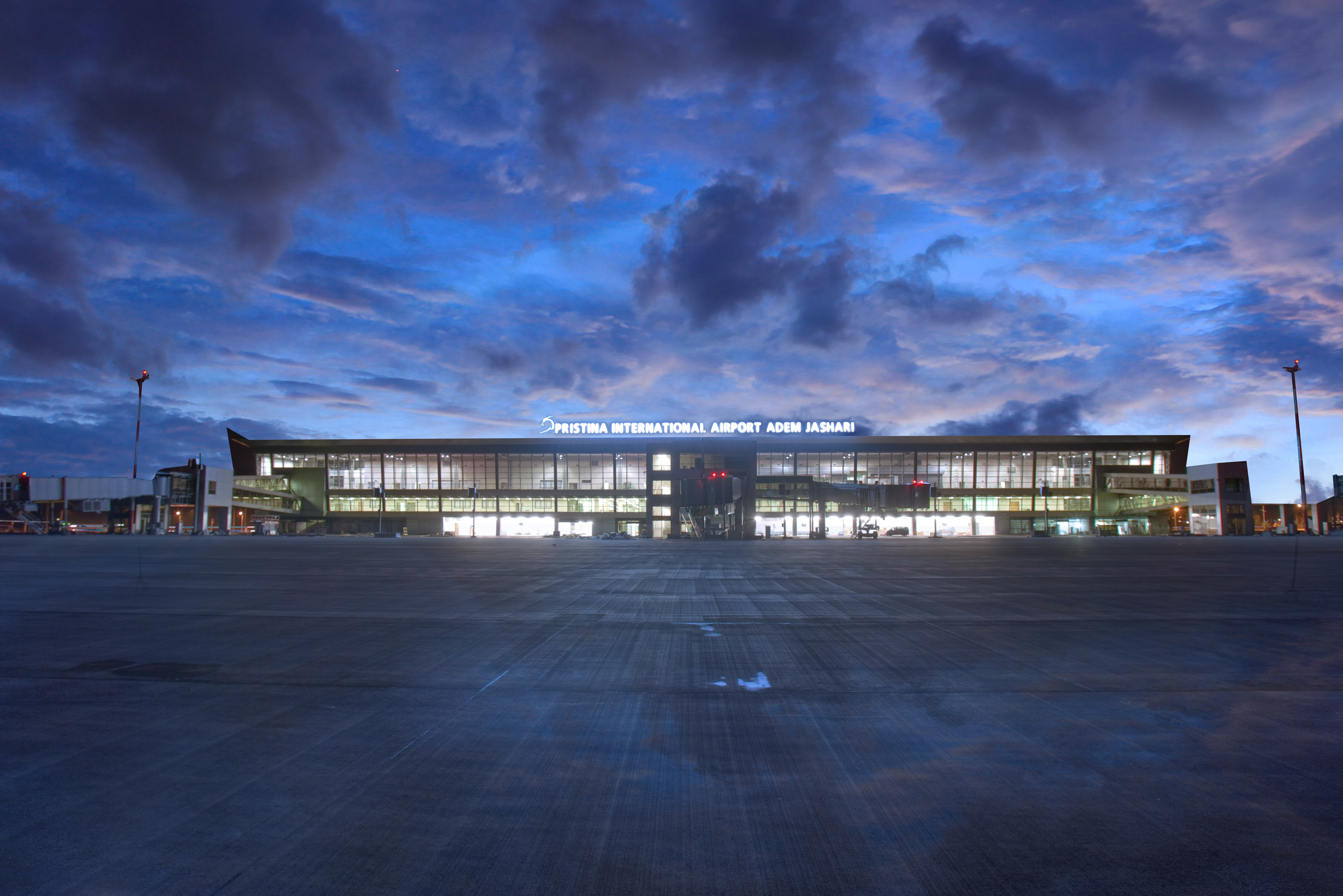
The Pristina International Airport (PRN) handled more than 4 million passengers in 2024.

Road transportation of passengers and freight is the most common form of transportation in Kosovo. There are two main motorways in Kosovo: the R7 connecting Kosovo with Albania and the R6 connecting Pristina to the North Macedonian border at Hani i Elezit. The construction of the R7.1 Motorway began in 2017.

The R7 Motorway (part of Albania-Kosovo Highway) links Kosovo to Albania's Adriatic coast in Durrës. Once the remaining European route (E80) from Pristina to Merdare section project will be completed, the motorway will link Kosovo through the present European route (E80) highway with the Pan-European corridor X (E75) near Niš in Serbia. The R6 Motorway, forming part of the E65, is the second motorway constructed in the region. It links the capital Pristina with the border with North Macedonia at Hani i Elezit, which is about 20 km (12 mi) from Skopje. Construction of the motorway started in 2014 and finished in 2019.

Trainkos operates daily passenger trains on two routes: Pristina – Fushë Kosovë – Pejë, as well as Pristina – Fushë Kosovë – Ferizaj – Skopje, North Macedonia (the latter in cooperation with Macedonian Railways). Freight trains also run throughout the country.

The nation hosts two airports, Pristina International Airport and Gjakova Airport. Pristina International Airport is located southwest of Pristina. It is Kosovo's only international airport and the only port of entry for air travelers to Kosovo. In 2024, the Pristina International Airport handled a total of 4,082,481 passengers. Gjakova Airport was built by the Kosovo Force (KFOR) following the Kosovo War, next to an existing airfield used for agricultural purposes, and was used mainly for military and humanitarian flights. The local and national government plans to offer Gjakova Airport for operation under a public-private partnership with the aim of turning it into a civilian and commercial airport.

=== Media ===
Kosovo ranks 99th out of 180 countries in the 2025 World Press Freedom Index report compiled by the Reporters Without Borders, with a score of 52.73 indicating difficult conditions. Media in Kosovo consists of radio, television, newspapers, and internet web sites, with most surviving from advertising and subscriptions. As according to IREX there are 92 radio stations and 22 television stations.

== Culture ==
=== Arts ===
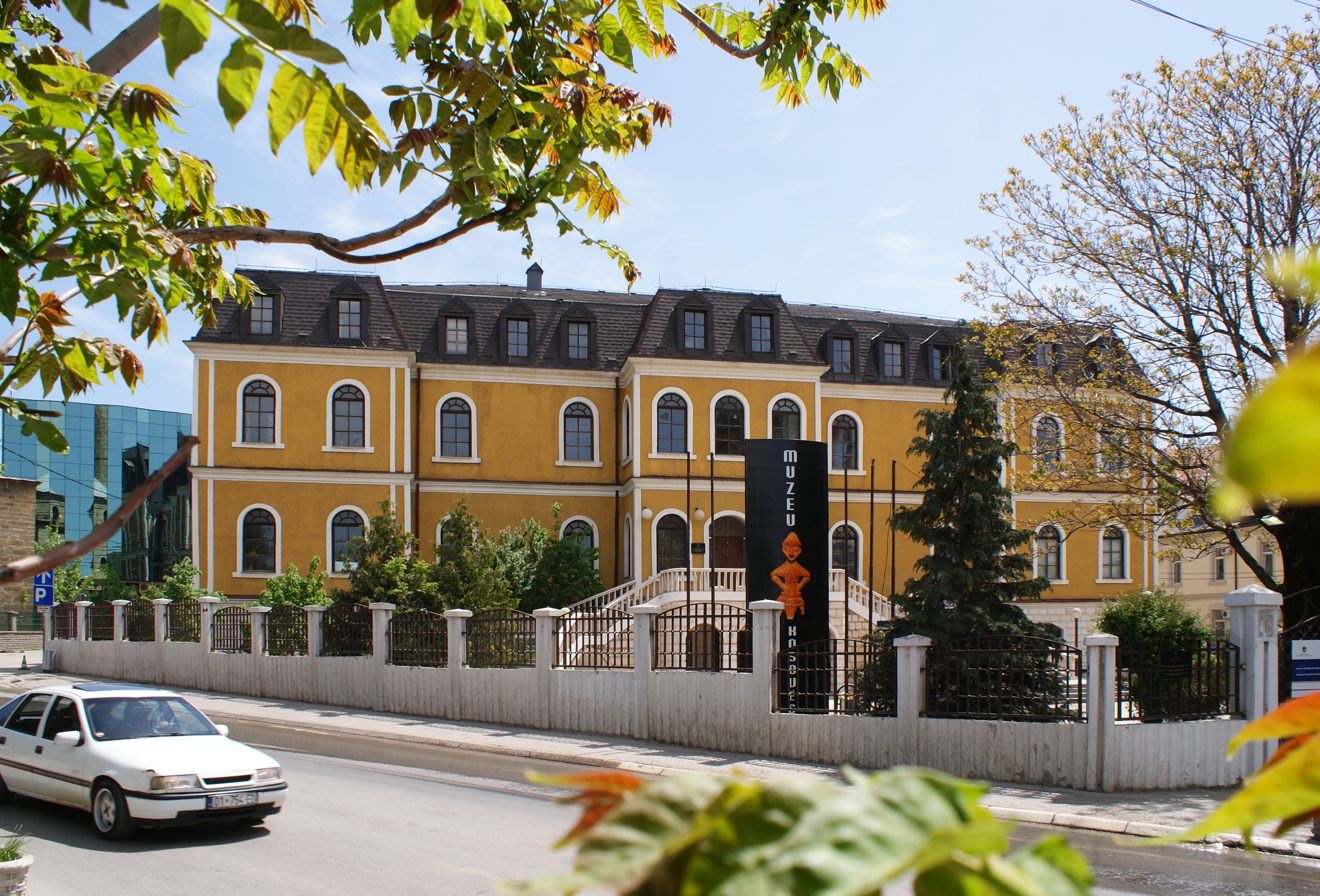
The National Museum of Kosovo

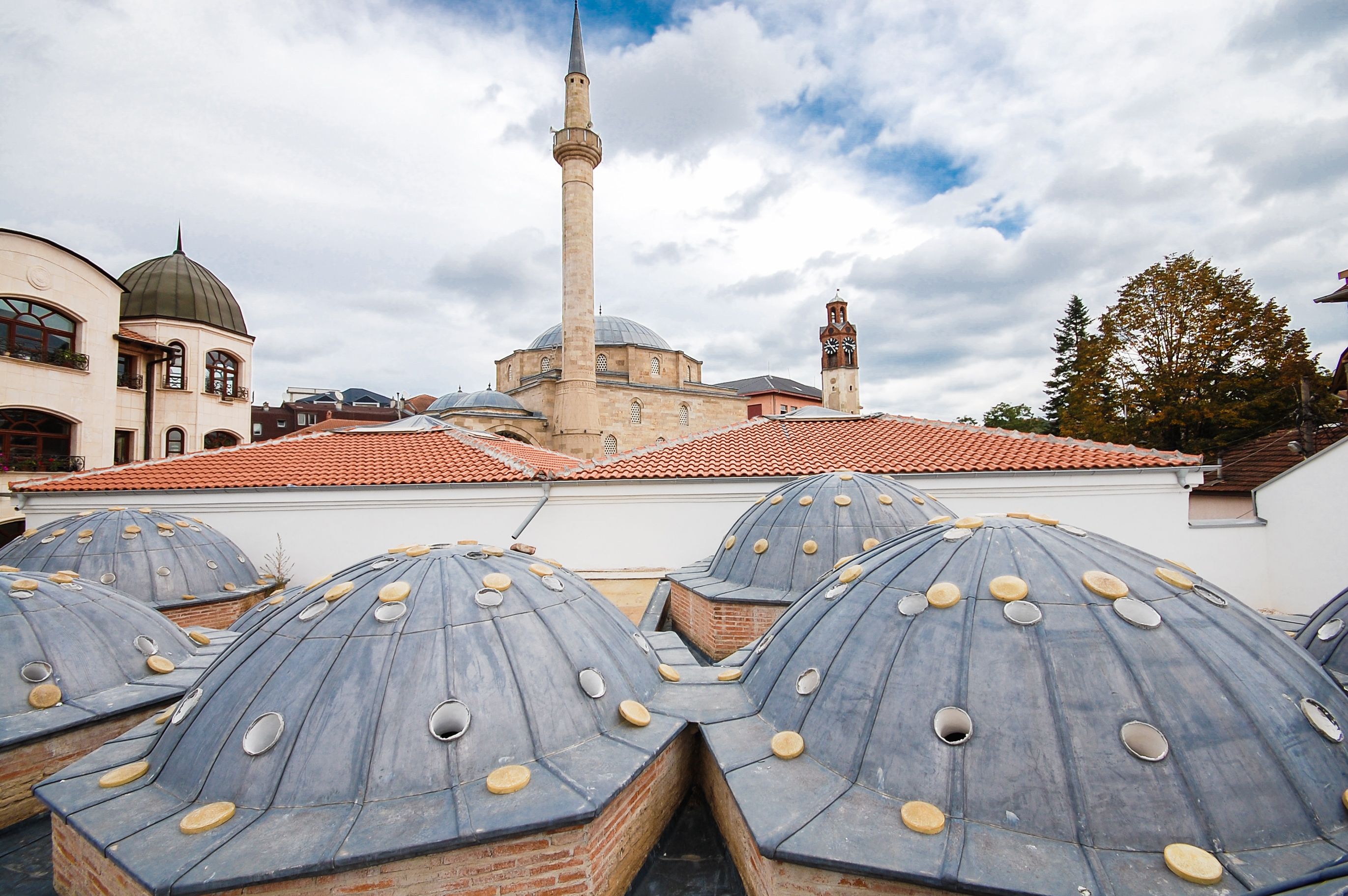
The Great Hamam of Pristina was built in the 15th century and was part of the Imperial Mosque in Pristina.

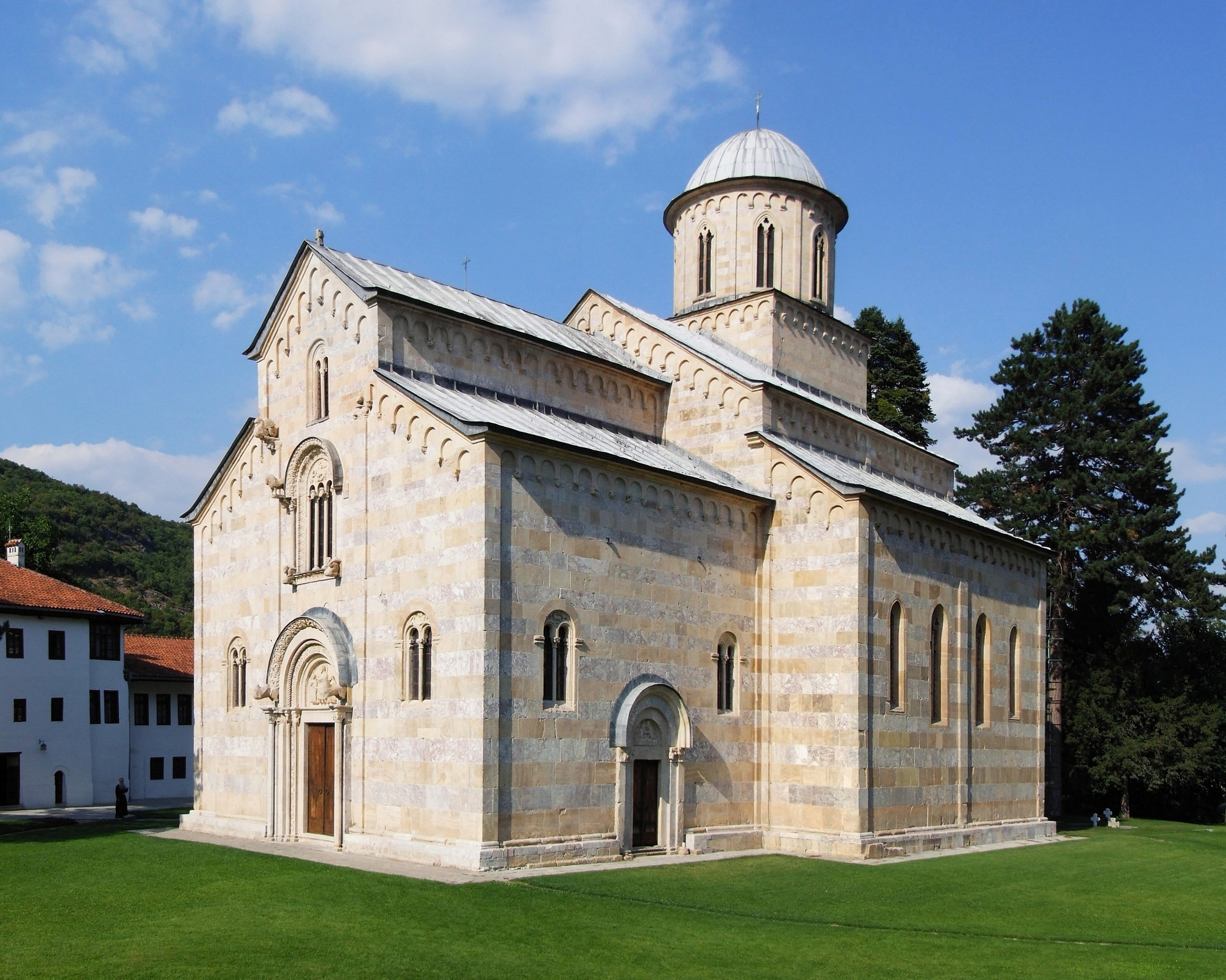
Visoki Dečani, a medieval Serbian Orthodox Christian monastery located near Deçan, Kosovo

The architecture of Kosovo dates back to the Neolithic, Bronze and Middle Ages. It has been influenced by the presence of different civilisations and religions as evidenced by the structures which have survived to this day.

Kosovo is home to many monasteries and churches from the 13th and 14th centuries that represent the Serbian Orthodox legacy. Architectural heritage from the Ottoman Period includes mosques and hamams from the 15th, 16th and 17th centuries. Other historical architectural structures of interest include kullas from the 18th and 19th centuries, as well as a number of bridges, urban centres and fortresses. While some vernacular buildings are not considered important in their own right, taken together they are of considerable interest. During the 1999 conflict in Kosovo, many buildings that represent this heritage were destroyed or damaged. In the Dukagjini region, at least 500 kullas were attacked, and most of them destroyed or otherwise damaged.

In 2004, UNESCO recognised the Visoki Dečani monastery as World Heritage Site for its outstanding universal value. Two years later, the site of patrimony was extended as a serial nomination, to include three other religious monuments: Patriarchate of Peja, Our Lady of Ljeviš and Gračanica monastery under the name of Medieval Monuments in Kosovo. It consists of four Serbian Orthodox churches and monasteries, which represent the fusion of the eastern Orthodox Byzantine and the western Romanesque ecclesiastical architecture to form the Palaiologan Renaissance style. The monuments have come under attack, especially during the 2004 ethnic violence. In 2006, the property was inscribed on the List of World Heritage in Danger due to difficulties in its management and conservation stemming from the region's political instability.

International exposure of Kosovan art was limited in the 1990s due to Slobodan Milošević's regime and the difficult circumstances during the struggle for independence.

In February 1979, the Kosova National Art Gallery, now known as the National Gallergy of Kosovo, was founded. It became the highest institution of visual arts in Kosovo. It was named after one of the most prominent artists of Kosovo Muslim Mulliqi. Engjëll Berisha, Masar Caka, Tahir Emra, Abdullah Gërguri, Hysni Krasniqi, Nimon Lokaj, Aziz Nimani, Ramadan Ramadani, Esat Valla and Lendita Zeqiraj are some of few Albanian painters born in Kosovo.

=== Music ===
Although the music in Kosovo is diverse, authentic Albanian and Serbian music still exist. Albanian music is characterised by the use of the Çifteli. Classical music is well known in Kosovo and has been taught at several music schools and universities. In 2014, Kosovo submitted their first film for the Academy Award for Best Foreign Language Film, with Three Windows and a Hanging directed by Isa Qosja.

A baked-clay ocarina found in the village of Runik is considered to be the oldest musical instrument found in Kosovo and one of the oldest ocarinas ever found in Europe. The Runik ocarina is thought to be at least 8,000 years old.

Albanian epic poetry, found in Kosovo and Northern Albania, is sung while accompanied by a lahutë or çifteli. Kosovar music is influenced by Turkish music due to the almost 500-year span of Ottoman rule in Kosovo though Kosovar folklore has preserved its originality and exemplary. Archaeological research tells how old this tradition is and how it was developed in parallel with other traditional music in the Balkans. Roots dating to the 5th century BC have been found in paintings on stones of singers with instruments. (There is a famous portrait of "Pani" holding an instrument similar to a flute).

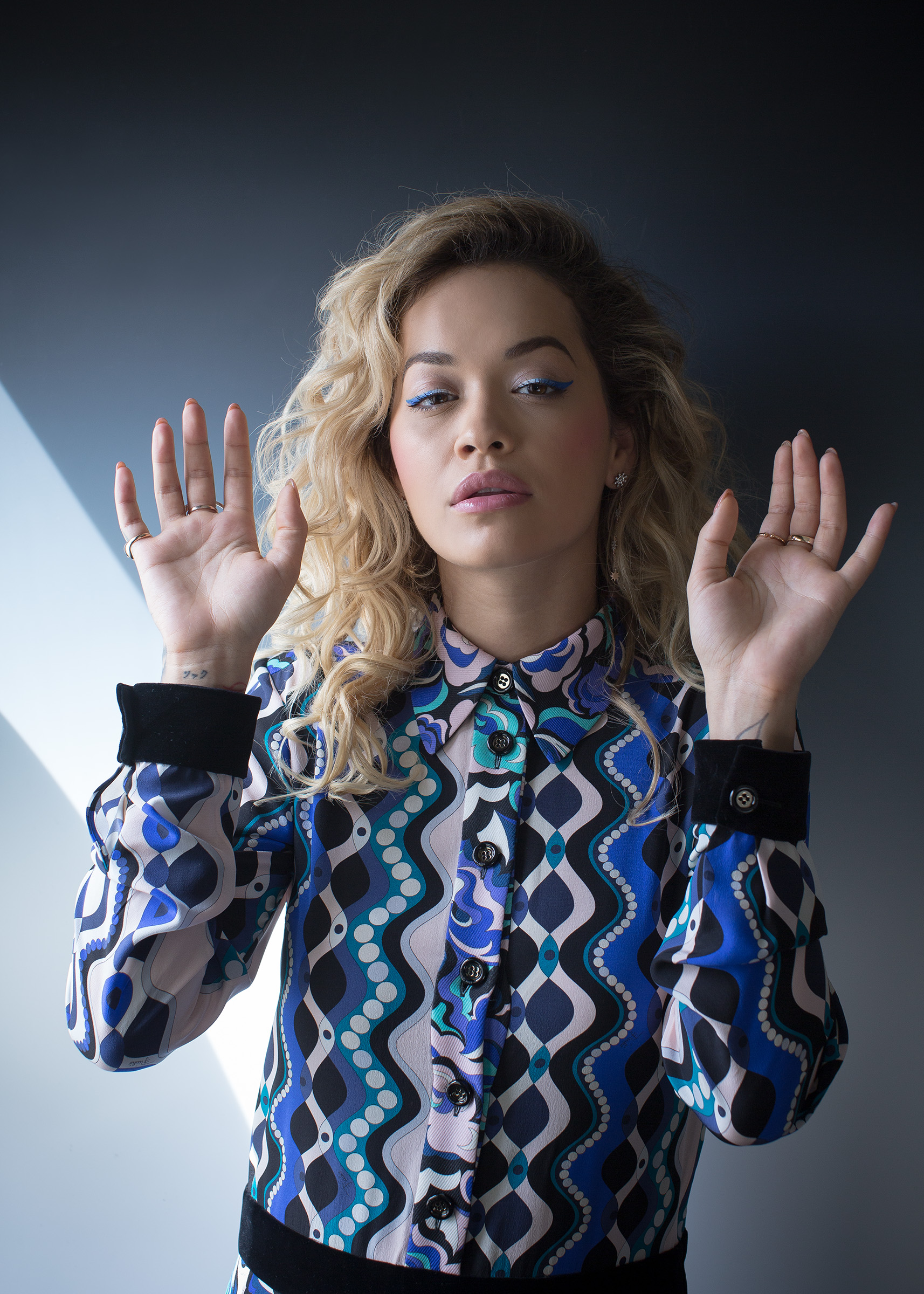
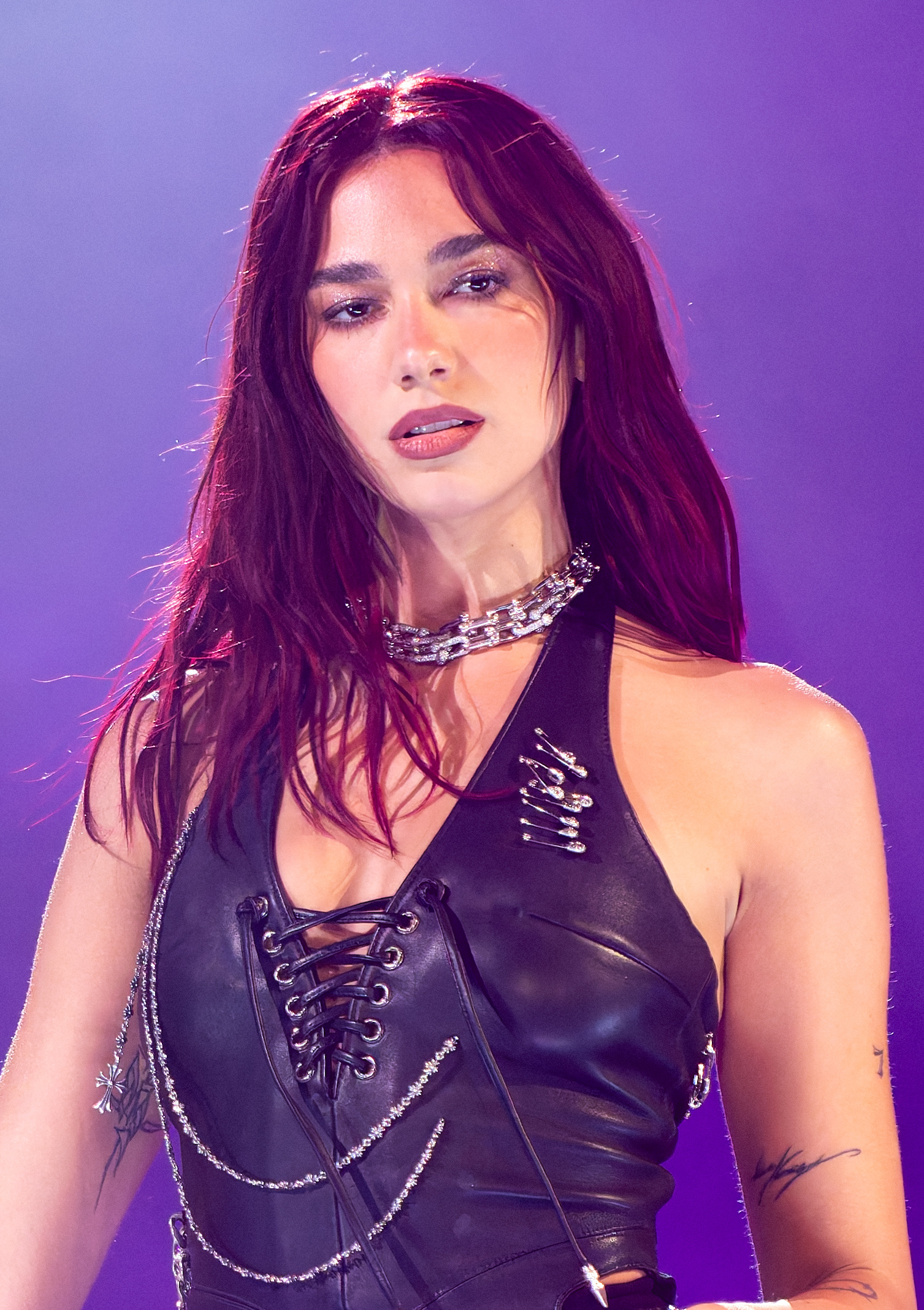
Rita Ora (left) and Dua Lipa (right) are both singers that come from Kosovo.

The contemporary music artists Rita Ora, Dua Lipa and Era Istrefi are all of Albanian origin and have achieved international recognition for their music. One widely recognised musician from Prizren is guitarist Petrit Çeku, winner of several international prizes.

Serbian music from Kosovo presents a mixture of traditional music, which is part of the wider Balkan tradition, with its own distinctive sound, and various Western and Turkish influences. Serb songs from Kosovo were an inspiration for 12th song wreath by composer Stevan Mokranjac. Most of Serbian music from Kosovo was dominated by church music, with its own share of sung epic poetry. Serbian national instrument Gusle is also used in Kosovo.

Viktorija is the only artist from Kosovo who represented Yugoslavia in the Eurovision Song Contest as part of Aska in 1982. Singer Rona Nishliu finished 5th in the 2012 Eurovision Song Contest, while Lindita represented Albania in 2017. Several Serbian singers from Kosovo have also participated in the Serbian national selection for the Eurovision Song Contest. Nevena Božović represented Serbia in the Junior Eurovision Song Contest and twice in the Eurovision Song Contest, firstly as a member of Moje 3 in 2013 and as a solo act in 2019.

=== Cinema ===
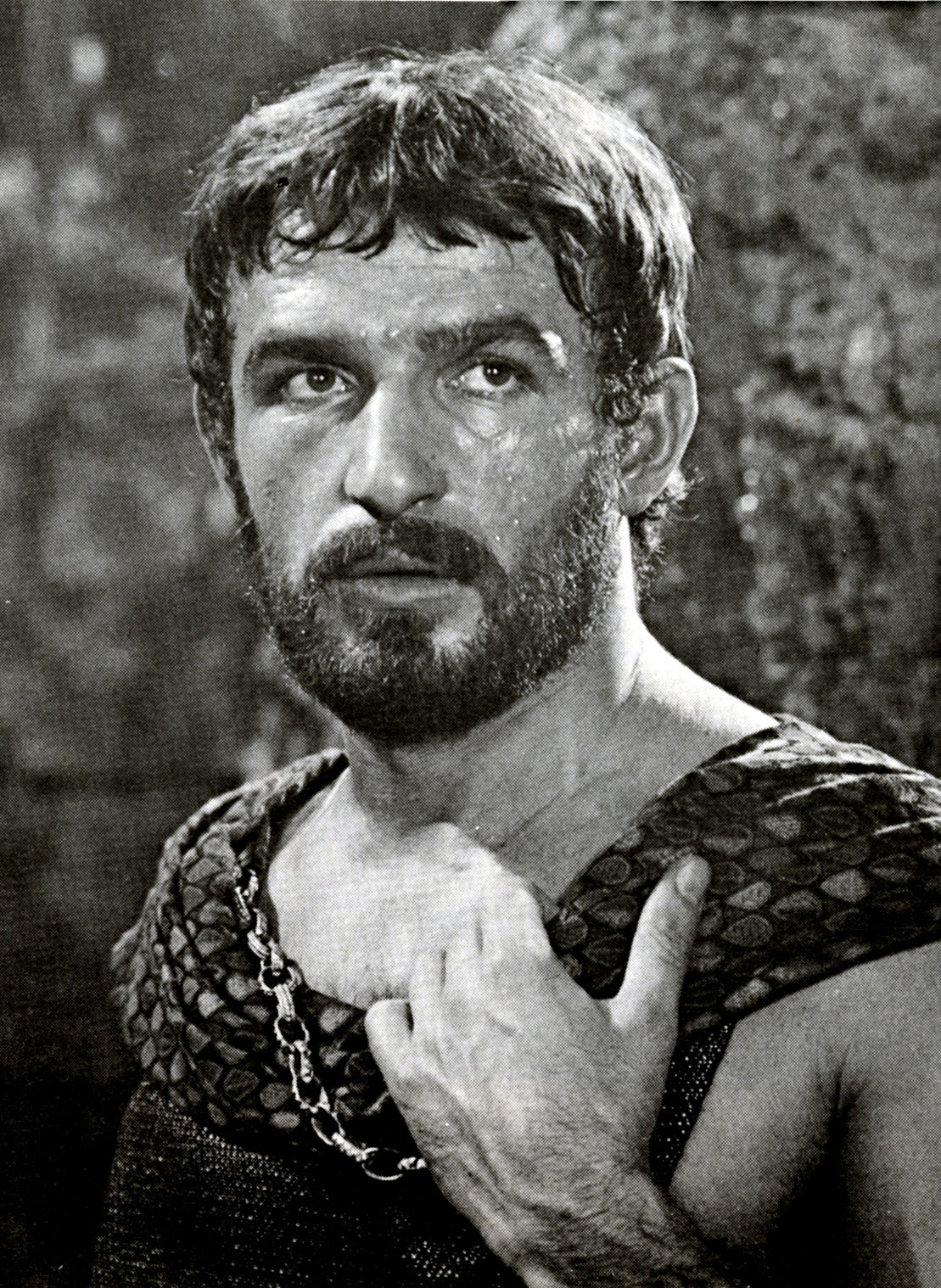
Bekim Fehmiu was the first Eastern European actor to star in Hollywood during the Cold War.

The film industry of Kosovo dates from the 1970s. In 1969, the parliament of Kosovo established Kosovafilm, a state institution for the production, distribution and showing of films. Its initial director was the actor Abdurrahman Shala, followed by writer and noted poet Azem Shkreli, under whose direction the most successful films were produced. Subsequent directors of Kosovafilm were Xhevar Qorraj, Ekrem Kryeziu and Gani Mehmetaj. After producing seventeen feature films, numerous short films and documentaries, the institution was taken over by the Serbian authorities in 1990 and dissolved. Kosovafilm was reestablished after Yugoslav withdrawal from the region in June 1999 and has since been endeavouring to revive the film industry in Kosovo.

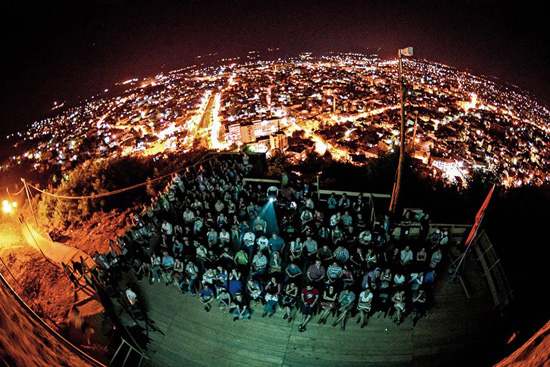
Dokufest in Prizren

Dokufest, an international documentary and short film festival, is the largest film event in Kosovo. The festival is held each August in Prizren, and attracts numerous international and regional artists. Films are screened twice a day in three open-air cinemas as well as in two regular cinemas. In addition to its films, the festival is also well known for lively nights after the screening. Various events happen within the scope of the festival: workshops, DokuPhoto exhibitions, festival camping, concerts, which altogether turn the city into a charming place to be. In 2010, Dokufest was voted as one of the 25 best international documentary festivals.

International actors of Albanian origin from Kosovo include Arta Dobroshi, James Biberi, Faruk Begolli and Bekim Fehmiu. The Prishtina International Film Festival is the largest film festival, held annually in Pristina, in Kosovo that screens prominent international cinema productions in the Balkan region and beyond, and draws attention to the Kosovar film industry.

The movie Shok was nominated for the Academy Award for Best Live Action Short Film at the 88th Academy Awards in 2016. The movie was written and directed by Oscar nominated director Jamie Donoughue, based on true events during the Kosovo War. Shok's distributor is Ouat Media, and the social media campaign is led by Team Albanians.

=== Cuisine ===
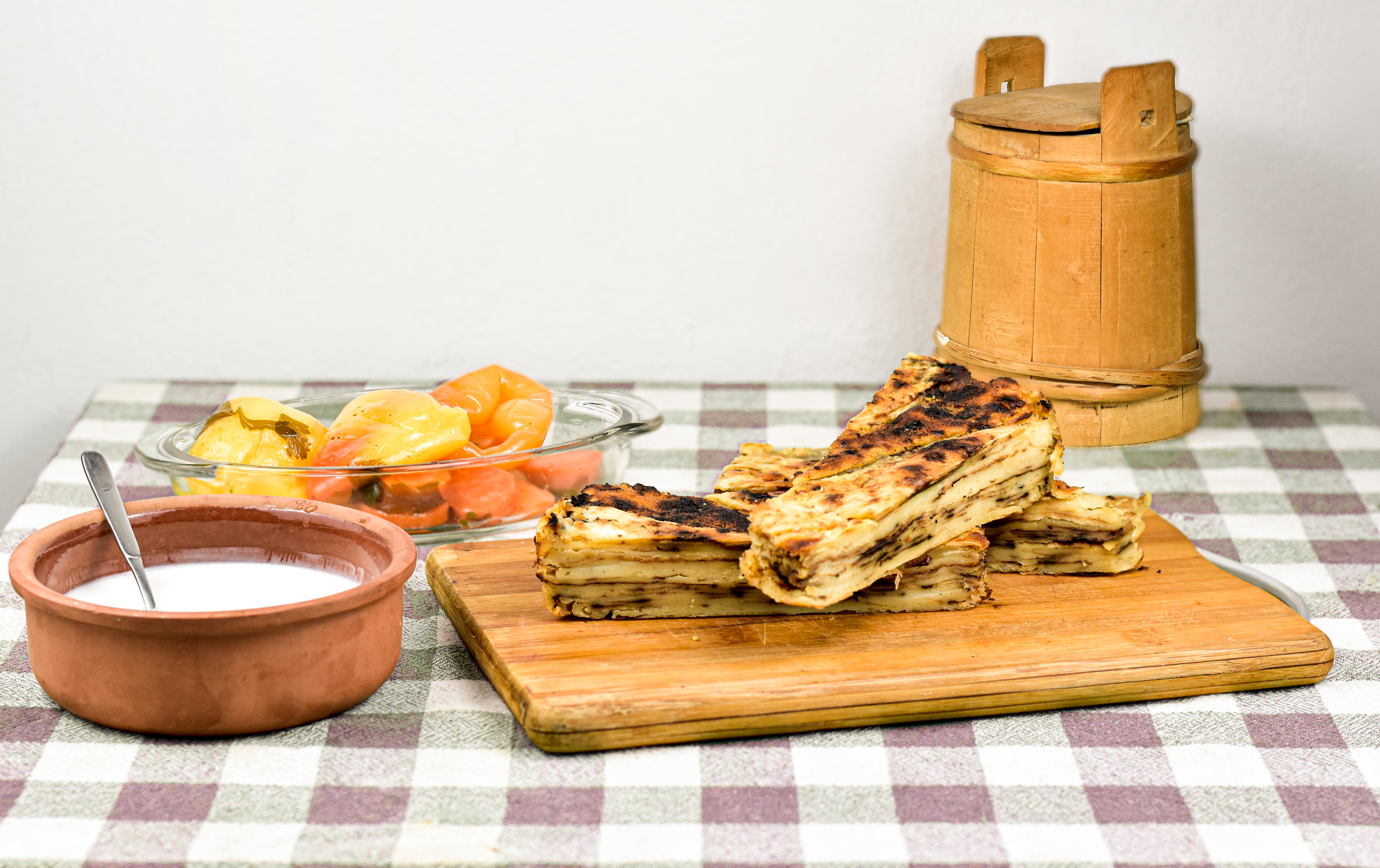
Fli is one of the most favoured dishes of traditional Albanian cuisine in Kosovo.

Kosovar cuisine is distinguished by multifaceted culinary influences derived from Balkan, Mediterranean, and Ottoman traditions.

=== Sports ===
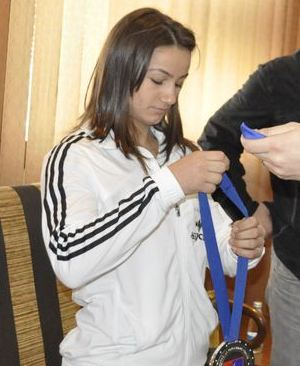
Majlinda Kelmendi, an Olympic, World and European champion judoka

Since its declaration of independence in 2008, Kosovo has made substantial advancements in international sports. The nation's inaugural participation in the Olympic Games occurred at the 2016 games, where it achieved a milestone by securing its first medals. Kosovo's involvement in the European Games began in 2015, during which the nation amassed four medals. Additionally, Kosovo commenced participation in the Mediterranean Games in 2018, obtaining ten medals. Forthcoming, Kosovo is scheduled to host the 2030 games. Athletes such as Laura Fazliu, Akil Gjakova, Nora Gjakova, Majlinda Kelmendi, Loriana Kuka, and Distria Krasniqi have played significant roles in Kosovo's sporting achievements, with Majlinda Kelmendi winning the nation's first Olympic gold medal. Judo has become an important part of Kosovo's success in international competitions, accounting for the majority of the nation's medals. Prior to Kosovo's independence, other athletes such as Aziz Salihu, Vladimir Durković, Fahrudin Jusufi, and Milutin Šoškić represented Yugoslavia.

Kosovo achieved full membership status in both the Union of European Football Associations (UEFA) and Fédération Internationale de Football Association (FIFA) in 2016, facilitating the nation's participation in international football competitions. As a result, the national football team of Kosovo became eligible to compete in qualification rounds for major tournaments such as the UEFA Nations League, the European Championship and the FIFA World Cup. The team's paramount achievement occurred during the 2018–19 edition of the UEFA Nations League, wherein they concluded the tournament atop their League D group, maintaining an unbeaten record of four victories and two draws, thus securing promotion to a higher competitive tier. Several Kosovo-Albanian players have opted to represent various European nations, highlighting figures examples, including Lorik Cana for Albania and Adnan Januzaj for Belgium. Furthermore, key contributions have come from players such as Valon Behrami, Xherdan Shaqiri, and Granit Xhaka.

== See also ==
- List of Kosovo Albanians
- Outline of Kosovo
- Partition of Albania – 1913 delineation of the new Albanian state
