= Llap (region) =

Historical and geographical region of Kosovo

Coordinates: 42°55′N 21°12′E

- Historical and geographical region of Kosovo
- Interactive map of Llap
- Country: Kosovo
- Municipalities: Podujevë

Area
  - Total: 632 km^{2} (244 sq mi)
- Highest elevation: 1,770 m (5,810 ft)
- Lowest elevation: 550 m (1,800 ft)

Population (2011)
  - Total: 88,499
  - Density: 133.5/km^{2} (346/sq mi)
- Demonym(s): Llapjan (Male); Llapjane (Female)

The Llap Region (Albanian: Krahina e Llapit, lit. 'Region of Llap'; Serbian: Лабско поље, romanized: Labsko polje, lit. 'Plain of Lab') is a region located in the north-eastern part of Kosovo. Llap in the broadest sense includes the watershed of the Llap River. The Llap water collection begins in the mountains of Kopaonik in the north and west and its source is considered to be the village of Pollatë, and ends by joining the Sitnica river in Lumadh, municipality of Vushtrri, in the north-west of Pristina. The topographic watershed of the Llap River covers an area of 945.4 km^{2} (365.0 sq mi).

This area approximately corresponds to the administrative territory of the municipality of Podujevë in the current division of Kosovo. Podujevë as a city in the Llap region is the most important economic, political, administrative, educational, cultural and health center. About 120 villages gravitate to this region, although some of them administratively belong to the municipalities of Pristina, Vushtrri or Mitrovica. The municipality of Podujevë includes 78 villages.

== Etymology ==
The territory of Llap is named after the hydronym Llap (Albanian name for the Llap River). Many scholars take the hydronym Lab as ancient and bring it from an alb-, from which lab-, alp- could emerge.

== Geography ==
The Llap region is located on north-east part of Kosovo. The average elevation of Llap is 825m (Anonymos, 1995). Through this region pass the main road and border which connects Kosovo and Serbia. Along Llap region since Illyrian-Roman period, passed an important Balkan route Lissus–Naissus (Lezhë–Niš) or Via De Zenta, which connected the Adriatic Coast with central part of Balkan Peninsula. In north-east and east of the region are two important saddles: Përpellac Peak (813m) and Merdar Peak (647m oversea level) (Anonymos, 1995).

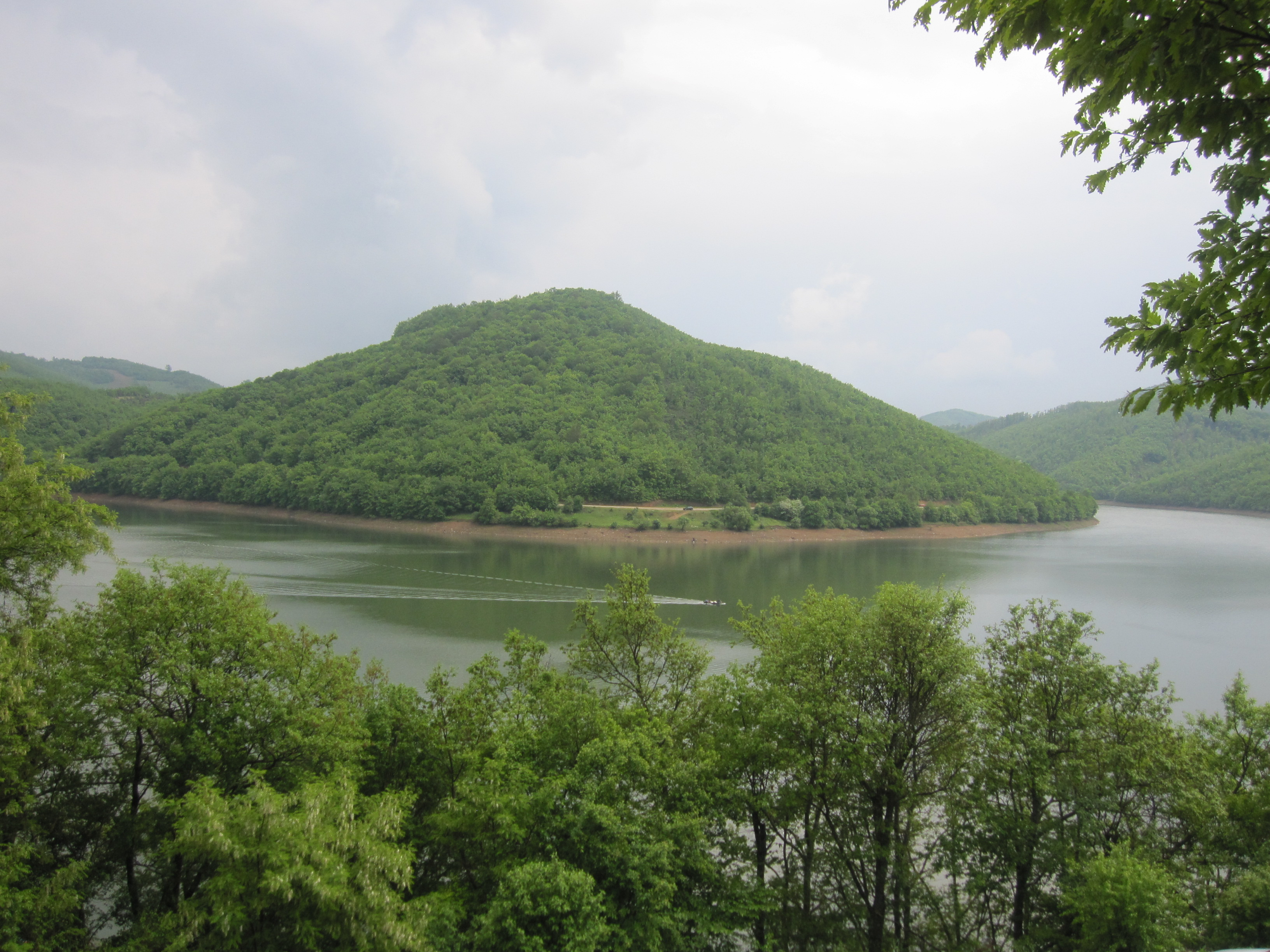
Lake Batllava

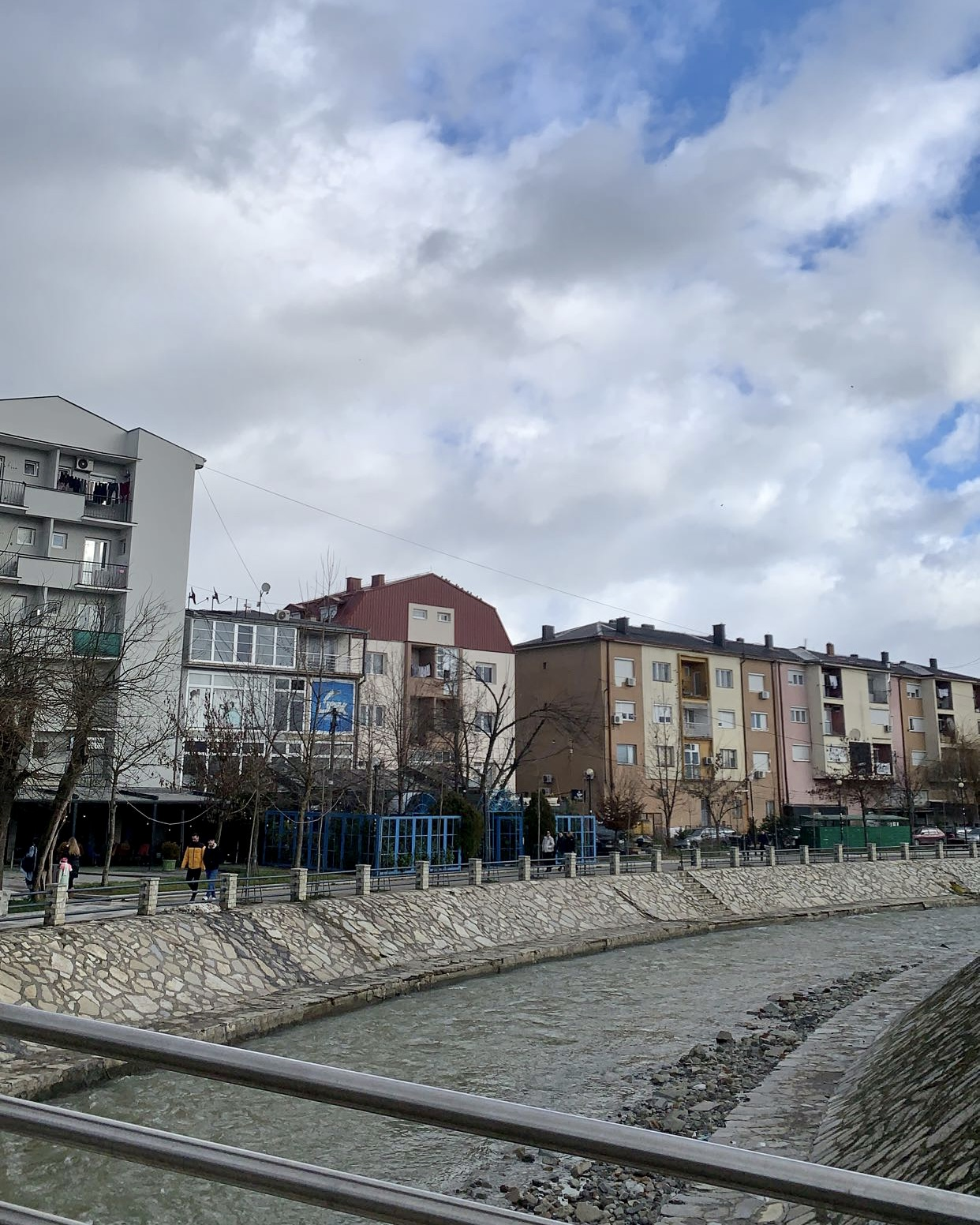
Llap River

Llap region as a microgeographical whole is divided into three parts:

1. Llap field (also called "Little Kosovo", Serbian: Malo Kosovo, Albanian: Kosova e Vogël), which stretches from the village of Repë in the north and south to the village of Besi-Barilevë, with a length of more than 35 km and with a width of 12–15 km on the line Batllavë-Llapashticë e Epërme.
2. Llap gorge, which includes the territory from the village of Repë to the village of Murgull, with a length of about 14 km, and from Bellasica to the Cape of Uglari, which is about 14 km wide.
3. Gallap of Llap, which stretches from the village of Batllavë to the village of Metergoc and from the village of Turuçicë to Keqekollë and Koliq. This territory has more hilly-mountainous areas.

== History ==
=== Prehistory ===
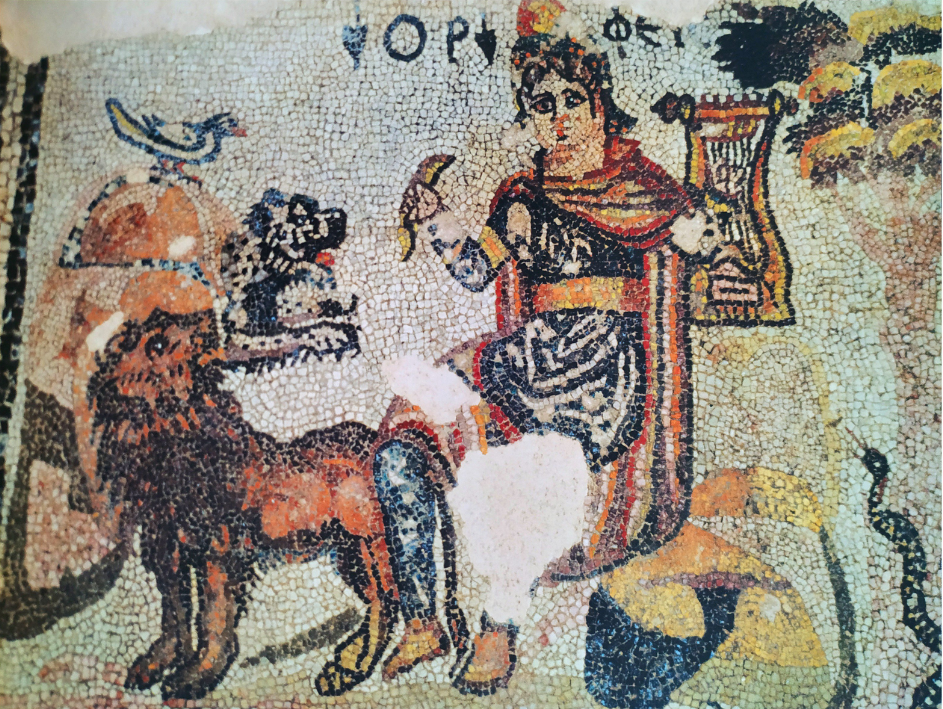
Roman Orpheus mosaic found in the ancient locality of Vendenis

This region was ruled by an Illyrian tribe, Dardani where the Kingdom of Dardania took place. The south part of the region, the Gallap of Llap, were inhabited by Galabri tribe. This may prove the origin of the toponym Gallap, which is thought to come from the name of this tribe. Strabo writes that they are a "people of the Dardaniatae, in whose land is an ancient city". In the village of Gllamnik an ancient locality has been found, who is believed to be Vendenis. This locality belongs to the Roman period (I-IV centuries) and that of late antiquity (IV-VI centuries). Although the excavations at this site were quite modest (a total of 534 m2 or only 2% of the area was excavated), they shed light on traces of Roman antiquity where special discoveries such as the Orpheus Mosaic, unique in the Balkans and beyond.

=== Medieval Period ===
Abbot of Diokle from the second half of the 12th century mentions that Rashka or Serbia extended until Arberia(Albania), the region of present day Llap.

=== Ottoman Period ===
Considering the fact that Kosovo was under Ottoman Rule, also Podujevë remained under Ottoman Rule from 1455 to 1912. In the first Ottoman records of the Sanjak of Viçitrina in 1455, we encounter the Nahija of Llap which was the second largest nahija in this sanjak. Nahija had 219 settlements, which includes some villages of today's municipalities of: Mitrovica, Vushtrri, Skenderaj, about 90% of Pristina and Podujevë as a whole. In the Defter of Jizya of 1485, Llapi had 5,952 Christian families while in 1488/89 Llapi had 7,399 households. In the Ottoman records of 1566–74, Nahija of Llap was divided into 4 smaller nahijas: Llap, Gollak, Belasnica and Trepča. After the partition, Nahija of Llap extended to the present territory of the municipality of Podujevë as a whole, and a large part of the municipality of Pristina, to the southernmost villages of this municipality.

In 1487, Albanian toponyms such as Arbanas were mentioned in the Nahija of Llapi. Ottoman writer Evliya Celebi mentioned the Llap River as having "its source in Albania" and joining other rivers before flowing into the Danube, during one of his travels to Kosovo in the 1660s.

In the 18th century the Nahija of Llap was part of the Sanjak of Pristina. At this time, Llapi lost many residents due to two plagues who stroke the place. During the Austro-Ottoman war the Austrian army destroyed and robbed the city of Podujevë twice. During the First Serbian Uprising, the Serbian army got into the village of Reçica and killed 30 people of Demë Ahmeti's house, an Albanian national hero. This happened at 28 June 1811, during the feast of Eid. The rebellion against Ottomans started when Sultan Abdyl Mejid proclaimed “The Saint Decree of Julhane” in 1839 which increased taxes and so it brought many rebellions. The population of Llapi fought against these reforms and during 1843 the Ottomans temporary left Llapi and started to organize the reoccupation. The rebels gathered many soldiers from the surrounding region and they won the battles against Ottomans, taking Pristina and stimulating a bigger rebellion in other regions. This rebellion was extinguished in 1847. When Serbia acquired the Sanjak of Niš in 1877, many Albanians started to leave their houses and to come to the other parts of Kosovo, where Llapi was tone of their first destinations. There is not a single village in Podujevë where Muhajirs or migrants cannot be found, furthermore, they established new villages. Albanians of Llapi, since the First League of Prizren did not pay taxes to the Ottomans. Afterwards, the Ottomans built a military cantonment during 1892 and 1899 since they detected Serbian Army movements near the border. The Albanian rebellion against Ottomans during 1906 was primary organized in the Llap region. Another rebellion was that of 1910 which started in the Llap region. The relationships between the residents and the Sublime Porte were becoming very fraught and when Sultan Mehmed V came to visit Kosovo, very few Llapi residents were present. Llapi is also known for its cooperation with Isa Boletini, who during 1911 operated around this zone. Many soldiers from around the villages of Llapi and Gallapi pledged loyalty to Boletini in 1912, in the Bradash pledge. Their goal was to initiate the general Albanian rebellion against Ottoman Rule and they were part of the rebellion until it ended.

=== Modern day ===
In 1997, the Kosovo Liberation Army was formed, resulting in a Yugoslav-led campaign against it in 1998. In response, NATO began a military campaign so it could protect the civilian population. During the Kosovo War, the town was the site of the Podujevë massacre in March 1999 in which 14 Kosovo Albanian women and children were killed by Serbian paramilitary forces. After the war, the process of establishing a Municipal Assembly began in 2002. Later, on 17 February 2008, Kosovo declared its independence.

== Notable people ==
- Jashar Erebara
- Adem Demaçi
- Fatmir Sejdiu
- Zahir Pajaziti
- Fadil Vokrri
- Granit Xhaka

== See also ==
- Demographics of Kosovo
- Geography of Kosovo

== Sources ==
- Elsie, Robert (2011). Historical Dictionary of Kosovo (2nd ed.). Lanham: Scarecrow Press. ISBN 9780810874831.
