= Rrafshi =

Rrafshi ("plateau" in Albanian) may refer to:

- Metohija (Rrafshi i Dukagjinit), region in Kosovo
- Llap (region) or Rrafshi i Llapit, region in Kosovo
- Kosovo (region) (Rrafshi i Kosovës), region in Kosovo
