= Gërdoc =

Village in Podujevo, Kosovo

- Village
- Interactive map of Gërdoc
- Country: Kosovo
- District: Prishtinë
- Municipality: Podujevë

Population (2024)
  - Total: 896
- Time zone: UTC+1 (CET)
  - Summer (DST): UTC+2 (CEST)

Gërdoc is a village in the municipality of Podujevo, Kosovo. The High Security Prison is located in this village, around 25 kilometers from the city of Prishtina.

== See also ==
- Podujevo
