= Dobratin =

Village in Podujevo, Kosovo

- Village
- Interactive map of Dobratin
- Country: Kosovo
- District: Prishtinë
- Municipality: Podujevë

Population (2024)
  - Total: 1,136
- Time zone: UTC+1 (CET)
  - Summer (DST): UTC+2 (CEST)

Dobratin is a village in the municipality of Podujevo, Kosovo.
