= Vendenis =

Cultural heritage monument of Kosovo

- Location within Kosovo
- Interactive map of Vendenis
- Location: Gllamnik, Podujevë, Kosovo
- Region: District of Pristina

Vendenis was an ancient city in Dardania in Kosovo. Among three road stations that were constructed in Dardania during the Roman period, Statio Vindenis, is one of the identified stations. This archaeological site is set at the area of the village of Gllamnik. The site is located approximately 5 kilometres (3.1 miles) south of Podujevë.

Another Illyrian city appears in Croatia as Vendum and is regarded as an Illyrian toponym possibly related to Albanian 'vend' or Gheg Albanian 'ven' meaning place or the place.

It is one of the road stations situated between Ulpiana and Naissus drawn on the Tabula Peutingeriana.

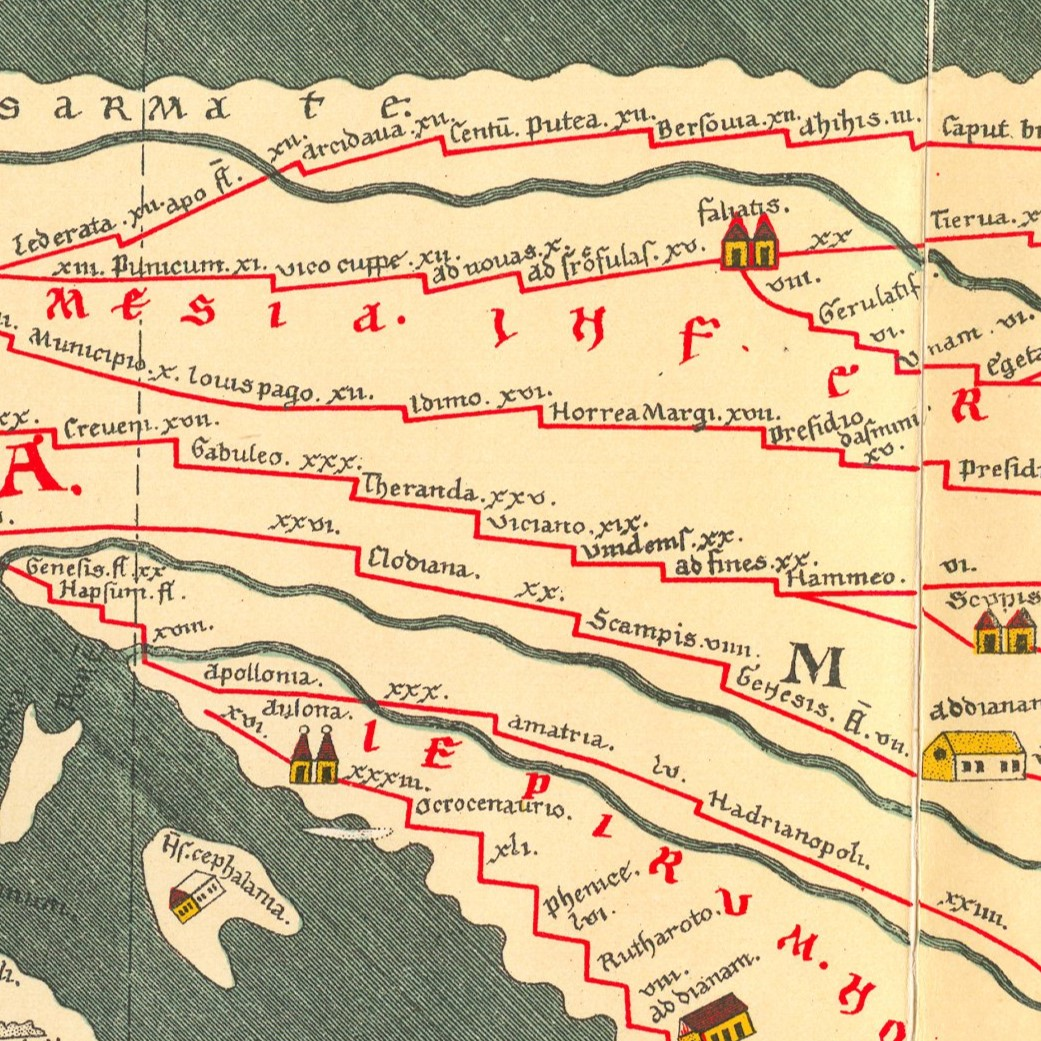
Vendenis on the Tabula Peutingeriana, shown centrally alongside Theranda and Viciana

== See also ==
- Archaeology of Kosovo
- List of settlements in Illyria
- Roman heritage in Kosovo
