= Kosovo student poisoning =

1990 toxic gas poisoning incident

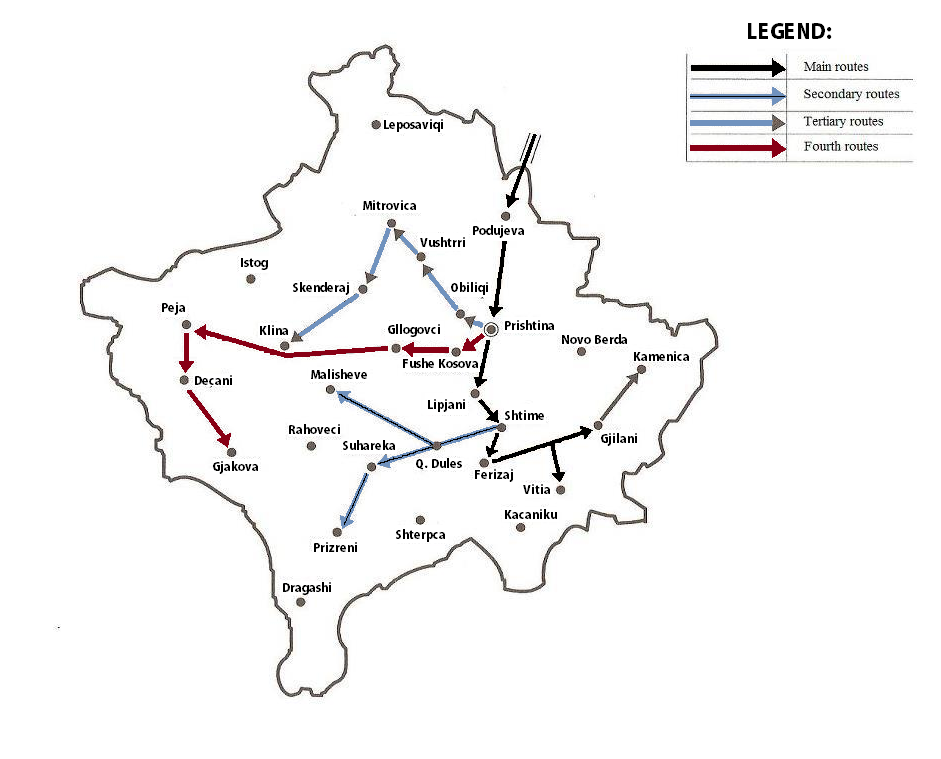
- Map diagram based on the analysis of poisoning in Kosovo
- Location: Kosovo
- Date: March 22, 1990; July 22, 1990; 08:45 a.m.
- Target: Albanian pupils and students
- Attack type: Poisoning with toxic gases
- Deaths: Unknown, very few
- Injuries: 7,421

The Kosovo student poisoning refers to the poisoning of nearly 8,000 Kosovar school students by toxic gases that occurred on 22 March 1990. As a result of a lack of information this incident was named the "mysterious disease" at first. Many had fainted, vomited or had violent convulsions. Almost all had inflamed eyes and a distinct facial flushing. The disease continued to strike the population for the rest of the year and 7,421 Albanian Kosovars were stricken with illness.

Since then, research has been undertaken by both Albanian and foreign nuclear experts, and they have been persistently confronted with a failure to reveal a common conclusion. Dr. Bernard Benedetti, a doctor for Médecins du Monde who had been in the province during the height of the troubles earlier in the year, said that the samples he had taken and had had analyzed by two laboratories in France suggested the involvement of a poison similar to the pesticide lindane. At that time, Albanian medical doctors appealed to the Serbian authorities to establish an independent and impartial international investigation of these events. This demand was rejected by the Serbian side. Albanian students were denied medical care as they were accused of "lying".

== Schools and victims ==
In March 1990, several months after the unilateral move by the Serbian government to segregate schools throughout Kosovo, a mysterious illness - massive poisoning of mostly school children appeared. The first victims to suffer this disease were students, who experienced the most terrific nightmare of their lives. Schoolchildren could detect a "white powder" on their desks. If they poked it, they quickly developed symptoms: First froth around the mouth and then cramps and fainting. Many schools from each corner of Kosovo began to report such happenings and from the first day on the absence of pupils in schools started to increase.

The first affected school, "Đuro Đaković" High School located in Podujevë, was affected on 20 March 1990. Only a few pupils were affected at first but with the days passing the number grew and the area of affected schools widened. Panic started to strengthen on 22 March when around 200 pupils of Podujevo's local schools and local residents showed symptoms of the illness. Most were driven to Pristina to receive first aid.

=== Expansion ===
- "Moša Pijade" (High School) located in Ferizaj. First cases appeared on 22 March
- "Muharem Bekteši" (High school) located in Vushtrri. First cases appeared on 22 March. The number of affected pupils and local citizens that day is claimed to have reached 200.
- "Boro e Ramizi" (Primary School) located in Prizren. First cases appeared on 22 March. The number of affected pupils that day is claimed to have reached 33.
- "Vellezerit Aksiq" (Primary School) located in Lipjan. First cases appeared on 22 March. The number of affected pupils and local citizens that day is claimed to have reached 35;
- "Vellazerimi" (Primary School) located in Obiliq. First cases appeared on 23 March. The number of affected pupils that day is claimed to have been 6.
- a) "16 Nentori" (Primary School),

b) "9 Maji" (High School) located in Kamenica. First cases appeared on 23 March. The number of affected pupils that day is claimed to have reached 51.

- "17 nentori" (High School) located in Mališevo. First cases appeared on 23 March. Few cases have been claimed.
- a) "Moša Pijade" (High School), b) "Peko Tećavćević" (High School), c) "Josip Broz Tito" (High School), d) "25 Maji" (Primary School), e) "Ganimete Terbeshi" (Primary School) located in Ferizaj. Cases reappeared on 23 March. The number of affected pupils that day is claimed to have reached 300.
- a) "Emin Duraku" (Kindergarten), b) "Hajdar Duši" (High School), c) "Boro Vukmirović" (High School), d) Erenik (Liquid's Factory) located in Gjakova. First cases appeared on 23 March. The number of affected pupils and local citizens that day is claimed to have reached 200.
- "Muharem Bekteši" (High School) located in Vushtrri on 23 March. The case of the disease reappeared among pupils and also among local citizens. The number of affected pupils and local citizens that day is claimed to have reached 165.
- "Jeta e Re" (High School) located in Suva Reka. First cases appeared on 23 March. The number of affected pupils and local citizens that day is claimed to have reached 300.
- "Drita" (Primary School) located in Deçan. First cases appeared on 1 June. The number of pupils requesting for help that day was around 10.
- "25 Maji" (Primary School) located in Ferizaj on 1 June reappeared the case of "mysterious disease". The number of pupils requesting help that day was 5.
- "17 Nentori" (Primary School) located in Malisheva on 1 June reappeared the case of the disease. The number of pupils asking for help that day was 20.
- "Vellazerim Bashkimi" (Primary School) located in Suva Reka. On 1 June around 10 pupils asked for help.
- "Ivo Lola Ribar" (High School) located Pristina. By the end of May and beginning of June, cases started to appear in Pristina creating panic among locals.
- "Stanko Burić" (Primary School) located in Lipjan. The first cases appeared by the end of May where 5 pupils of this school requested help.

Many victims got first aid from Catholic nuns, most of whom were located in Viti. A nun's confession in "Glas Koncila" (6 May 1990) provides more information about nuns helping young girls and boys that were brought with the symptoms of "the mysterious disease" in the improvised hospitals and ambulances.

Aside from Albanians, a few Serbs and other nationalities were affected too. All had shown the same symptoms of the disease even though they were fewer in number.

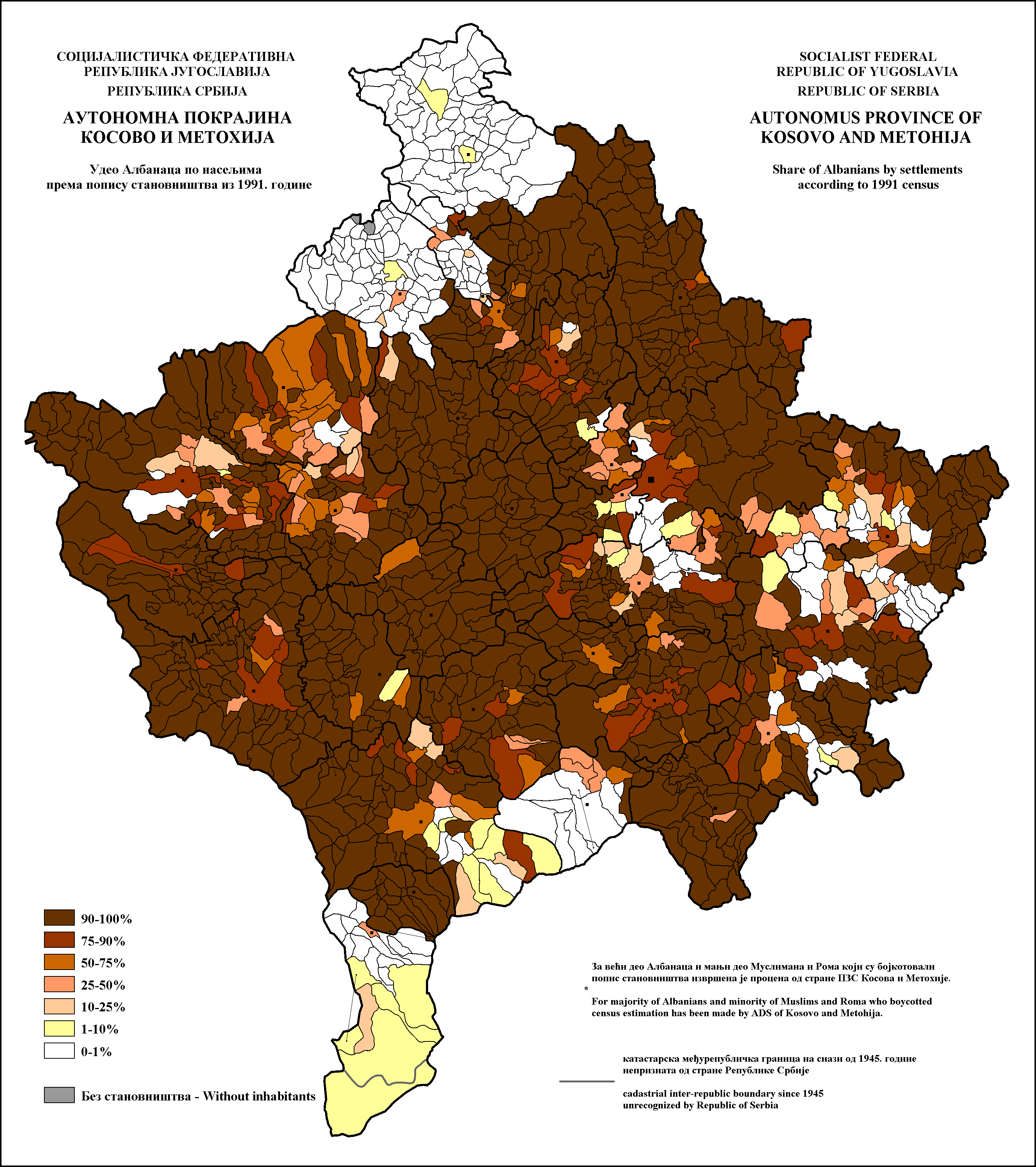
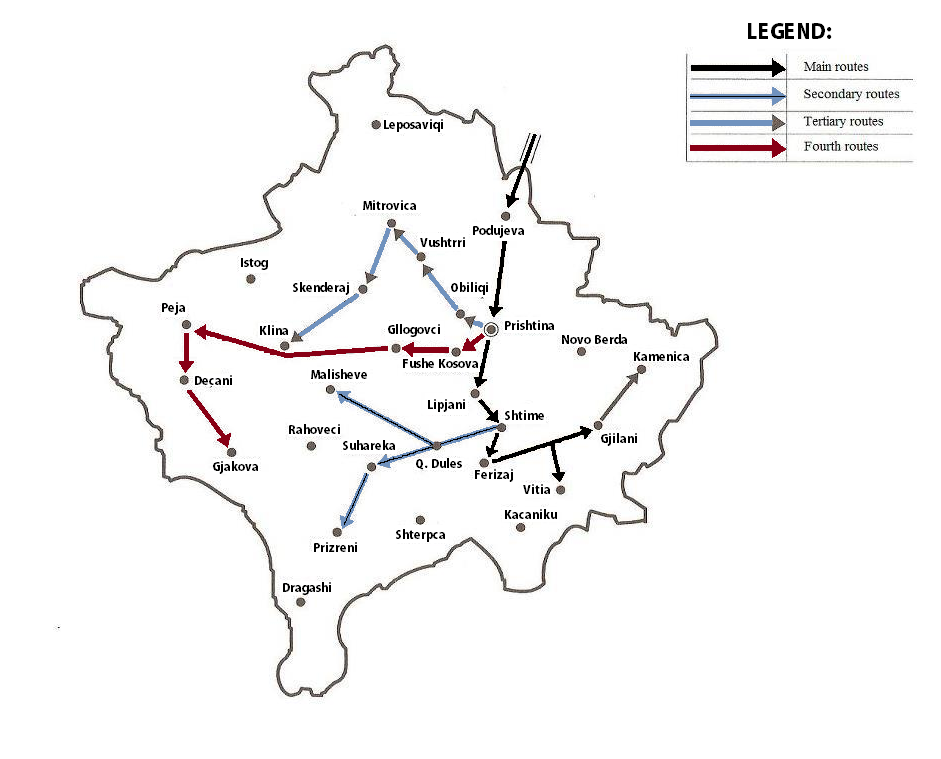
A comparison of the ethnic map of Kosovo in 1991 and the poisoning routes clearly shows that the routes followed ethnic boundaries, targeting only majority-Albanian settlements.

== Research ==
The Faculty of Medicine of the University of Pristina on 22 March organised a group consisting of Albanian and Serbian doctors and on the same day gave a statement to the public. They announced that it was an epidemic disease but they wouldn't give any other press until they possessed the results of the analysis of blood and urine from toxicology laboratories. Toxicological analysis of blood and urine didn't give a clear picture of the situation. The first samples were taken by Yugoslav Personnel and the analysis was done at the Military Academy in Belgrade, as Kosovo lacked such equipment. A verdict was reached after three days that the samples did not contain any poison. This rapid response induced Dr. Baren Cohen, who had spent time in Kosovo with the Helsinki Federation, to comment that it was strange for the academy to release results so quickly while for laboratories in the West it would take at least six weeks to make the same analysis.

=== Serbian doctors ===
Dr. Balošević, speaking on Serbian local television claimed that the events which were happening in Kosovo were all about "pure acting" for the Cannes Film Festival". In Belgrade, Serbian doctors protested against their Albanian colleagues claiming the Albanian doctors were participating in a "Children Masquerade". The same point of view was given from the Federal Health Institute on 26 March. Neuropsychiatric clinic chief Voja Trajković gave an alternative explanation. Speaking to the "Vjesnik" newspaper on March 26, he claimed the episode had to do with a "psychogen reaction" or with a "mass hysteria".

=== Albanian doctors ===
The chief of epidemiology of Kosovo Jusuf Dedushaj in a letter of 15 August 1990 denied fiercely the fact that the disease had psychic causes. He believed that if the disease had psychic causes then it would have appeared a year prior in 1989 when young Albanians were afraid to be vaccinated from Serbian doctors. Mr. Dedushaj had been invited as an expert to view different surveys in Podujeva and for his objections toward the situation in Kosovo, he was held by police for five days. He also discovered a microphone in his office. Dr. Besnik Bardhi along with Dr. Slobodan Lang, a professor at the Faculty of Medicine in Zagreb, were the organisers of a symposium which would analyse that this disease. A few days after their plans were published, their phones went through interception and even the family of Dr. Lang received telephone threats. Moreover, Dr. Ali Zatriqi and Dr. Flora Brovina stated their suspicions about the poisoning of the Albanian students. In the 1990s Mrs. Brovina had been taken by the Serbian Police from her working office because of her statements. In 1999 she was sent to prison for some months and was released only after international pressure.

=== Foreign doctors ===
Statistics - The table is based on the available data in reports during March 1990: (Note: These statistics testified that Kosovo was not plagued by a spontaneous mass hysteria, but a planned and well-organised operation.)
Symptoms	Percentage
Conjunctivitis	100%
Redness in the face	80%
Dizziness	84%
Oculogiration	79%
Difficulty in breathing	76%
Falter	62%
Stomach pain	58%
Redness of the throat	51%
Hypotonic muscular delayed	50.7%
Weakened muscular power	50.1%
Kink	45%
Itching in the eyes, nose and throat	44%
Sensitivity to light	39%
High blood pressure	31%
Increasing the pupil (mydriasis)	29%
Dry lips	29%
Accelerated breathing	17%
Suffering from heart tract	18%
Uncontrolled muscle tightening	16%
Reduced pupil of the eye	9.5%
Pupil that does not react to light	7%
The flow of the mouth drooling	5%
Eye Whitening	4%
Paresthaesia (as the flies walk)	3.5%
Anisocoria (change in pupil)	3%

In April 1990, the Federal Commission head, Slovenian doctor Anton Dolenc, declared that the incident had nothing to do with poisoning or any epidemic disease but declared a "psychogen reaction" as the only possible explanation. On 1 August 1990, French doctor Bernard Benedetti, in an interview for "The LaCourse" newspaper, claimed that he secretly entered a hospital in Pristina and obtained blood samples from 150 patients. The analyses were done in two laboratories in Paris. According to Dr. Benedetti, those patients were poisoned. When Mr. Benedetti visited Kosovo again in 2000, he confirmed the results of the 1990s tests. According to him, publication of the results was stopped by the French government in an attempt to preserve diplomatic relations with Serbia.

Two British doctors, Alastair Hay and John Fran, found no hints of poison. Writing in The Lancet newspaper they acknowledged that the only explanation for the widespread symptoms was "mass hysteria".

Another group called the Commission of Geneva was sent in Kosovo. This group was made up of Charles Graves, Verena Graf and Jean-Jacques Kirkyacharian. They didn't take blood analyses but during their trip they interviewed health personnel, children and their parents. They also took detailed notes of the symptoms. They wrote that some doctors had noticed a smell from the students which was similar to "vinegar". According to them, it was possible that the disease was caused from poisoning which might have been in the form of organic phosphates (nerve gas). The suspicion of nerve gases was reinforced in February 1992 when Aubin Heyndrickx gave a press statement in which he claimed that he had studied all reports and analysis of blood and urine and that he concluded that an organic chemical nerve gas had been used such as Sarin and Tabun, both listed as warfare agents. On the other hand, according to Dr. Bernard Benedetti and his analysis, the poisoning was not from Sarin or Tabun as Mr. Heyndrickx explained but instead had a molecular structure similar to a herbicide.

== Serbian media and police ==
On 24 March, an article in the Serbian newspaper "Politika Express" was called "Albanians got poisoned for dollars". On 6 April, the same newspaper praised the role of the Serbian Police because according to them, the police did the right thing by avoiding the appearance of a "comedy". Serbian officials called it "mass hysteria" and propaganda perpetrated by Albanian separatists. The Serbian police obstructed medical assistance, stopping patients in front of health institutions and preventing them from entering hospitals, or even taking away driving licences from ambulance drivers. In hospitals, the police lifted the medical records of patients (Dobreci, 1994). Some patients and physicians were interrogated and mistreated at the police station. Albanian medical doctors appealed to the authorities to establish an independent and impartial international investigation of these events. This demand was rejected.

== Zagreb symposium ==
In spring 1990 a symposium was held in Zagreb. Here, Franjo Plavšić, a pharmaceutical scientist from the Faculty of Pharmacy and Biochemistry of the University of Zagreb, should have presented the results of his analyses of the blood and urine, which he had taken from patients of the "mysterious disease". He had managed to isolate a chemical substance Dimetil Phosphoditionat (an organic phosphate). Just before he was due to present his findings Dr. Plavšić disappeared. Speaking in front of the press, Dr. Bardhi admitted his absence and also stated that Dr. Plavšić had been persistently under pressure.

=== The disappearance of blood analysis ===
Many sources in Kosovo during the 1990s had been spreading copies of rumors saying that the blood analyses which were sent to Ljubljana were missing. Albanian doctors for "The Lancet" newspaper had admitted that the blood analysis never arrived in Ljubljana. If Kosovo in 1990 was exposed in what Dr. Bernard Benedetti called "mass poisoning" then of course that there have been notes which explained how the poison had been distributed in schools. Even though those notes were suspicious. Mr. Halim Hyseni claims that some thieves were seen entering in schools and they were even arrested. There also existed evidence for a poison in the form of powder that was found on the floor of the schools. According to Dr. Benedetti who took from Ismet Ibishi and another activist a test tube containing the powder from a school in Kosovo, confirmed that the powder was similar to that in Podujevo. An IHF group visiting Kosovo in 1990 had the impression that the poison was emitted through ventilation pipes. This was a possibility, but there were many unventilated schools. Some witnesses claimed that the thieves had thrown "poison bombs" as was the case of Dr. Resmije Ademaj who had been poisoned when a student. Dr. Benedetti confirmed this possibility. Another alternative explanation was offered by chemist Shyqyri Dumani, who believed that the poison entered the body after contact with skin. Tested desktops in some schools registered microgram) amounts of poison. This specific poison was difficult to identify. If those micro poisons were used then there may have existed the opportunity to explain why some victims did not have serious symptoms or did not die. Mr. Durmani and his staff had also scrutinised ten blood tests and urine of children with poisoning symptoms. He found that some patients had a decreased value of calcium in blood but increased value in urine. The absence of calcium in blood causes muscle corrugation, which results in kinks. The patients were treated with calcium and this treatment gave positive results (as was the case with some poisoned students in Podujevo).

== Mass hysteria ==
In 1995 the theory of massive hysteria was strengthened. At the head of this theory was Zoran Radovanović, a professor in the Faculty of Medicine in Kuwait, who published an article in the European Journal of Epidemiology. In this paper Radovanović drew the conclusion that the disease had all the characteristics of a mass hysteria and a sequence of other circumstances eliminate the possibility that it might be poisoning. The main cause of mass hysteria was the respiratory infection in a single class in the gymnasium of Podujevo with 2,000 pupils on March 14 which eventually led to mass hysteria, when other students became ill on 19 March. Those classes in fact were hit by a new symptom because many students fainted or vomited. In the third phase on 22 March, the hysteria was distributed in the building of the same school but also at the same time in various parts throughout Kosovo. His objection toward poisoning was justified by the fact that few students had symptoms and none of these 2000 students had serious injuries (by excluding the many eye inflammations or red cheeks) although in some areas in Kosovo, many patients died. Radovanović's approach has been criticized by Goran Wassenius.

== In media ==
Since the 22 March, there have been plentiful of discussions on television in which the events in Kosovo were called the "masquerade of children" or even another formal version "acting". Other media kept describing details such as "it was a conspiracy organized by the Albanians supported from Zagreb and Ljubljana in order to gain the sympathy of the world". Another example for the influence on media was given by Besnik Bardhi. A week before the opening of the symposium in Zagreb, in Belgrade began an aggressive campaign of hostility against the meeting. The newspaper "Politika Express " played a leading role in efforts to describe Albanian patients as participants of a separatist plot but on 8 August 1990, it made a significant turning by admitting that the poisoning occurred in Kosovo and the poisons were found.

== Segregation ==
Segregation meant that Serbian and Albanian students would not be found in the schools at the same time. This was implemented in order to Serbian students in general to go to school in the mornings and Albanian ones at the afternoons. The announcement for separation occurred just before the appearance of the disease and along with this came the suspicion that the separation was done on purpose by Serbians to prepare for poisoning. The "reform" had not been expanded everywhere, when the poisoning began. The segregation was classified as an attempt to form a kind of an apartheid society in Kosovo.

== Sources ==
- Halim Hyseni, "E vërteta për helmimet", Pristina, 1996
- Göran Wassenius, "Den mystika sjukdomen" (Sëmundja mistike), Pristina, 2009, ISBN 978-91-977685-2-8
- Mertus, Julie. Kosovo: How Myths and Truths Started a War. Berkeley, CA: University of California, 1999, ISBN 0520218655 | ISBN 978-0520218659
