= Podujevë =

City and municipality in Kosovo

Podujevë: Podujevë or Besianë (Albanian) Podujevo or Подујево (Serbian)
- City and municipality
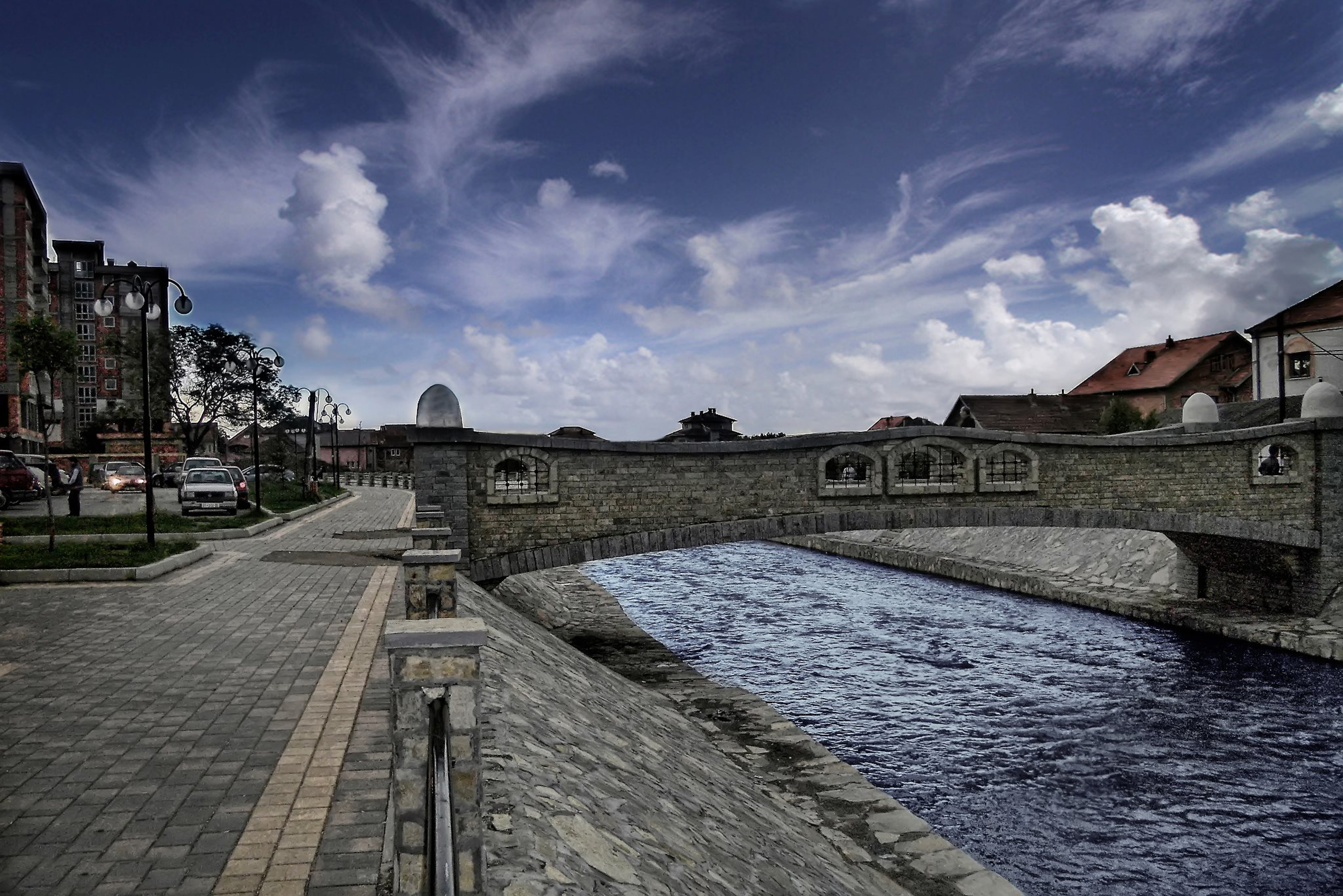
- View of downtown Podujevë

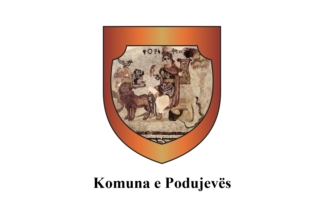
- Flag Emblem
- Interactive map of Podujevë
- Location within Kosovo
- Coordinates: 42°54′37.79″N 21°11′28.08″E
- Country: Kosovo
- District: District of Pristina

Government
  - Mayor: Shpejtim Bulliqi (LVV)

Area
  - Municipality: 632.59 km^{2} (244.24 sq mi)
  - Urban: 9 km^{2} (3.5 sq mi)
  - Rank: 1st in Kosovo
- Elevation: 670 m (2,200 ft)

Population (2024)
  - Municipality: 70,975
  - Rank: 7th in Kosovo
  - Density: 112.20/km^{2} (290.59/sq mi)
  - Urban: 22,448
  - Ethnicity: 98.7% Albanians; 1.3% Other
- Demonym(s): Albanian: Llapjan (m), Llapjane (f)
- Time zone: UTC+1 (CET)
  - Summer (DST): UTC+2 (CEST)
- Postal code: 11000
- Area code: +383 38
- Vehicle registration: 01
- Website: kk.rks-gov.net/podujeve

Podujevë or Besianë (Albanian definite form: Podujeva or Besiana) or Podujevo (Serbian Cyrillic: Подујево) is a city and municipality in the Pristina District in Kosovo. Podujevë is the largest municipality of Kosovo since it covers 632.59 km^{2} (244 sq mi) and is located in the historical and geographical region of Llap, named after the Llapi River, which flows through the city. According to the 2024 census, Podujevë has 70,975 inhabitants, making it the seventh most populous city in Kosovo after Peja and Gjakova.

== History ==
=== Antiquity ===
Llap Region, which Podujevë is part of, was inhabited early due to favorable natural conditions. Even though many monuments documenting antiquity have disappeared, some still remain. Such documents are archeological sources such as: foundations of forts, cemeteries, tiles, weapons as well as various denominations.

The oldest inhabitants of Llapi were the Dardanians. The first settlements were built near the rivers. Economic branches were: hunting, animal husbandry, etc. During the Roman occupation, this area suffered a lot of damage, especially the fortified parts. An important center of this time was Vendenisi (now Gllamniku).

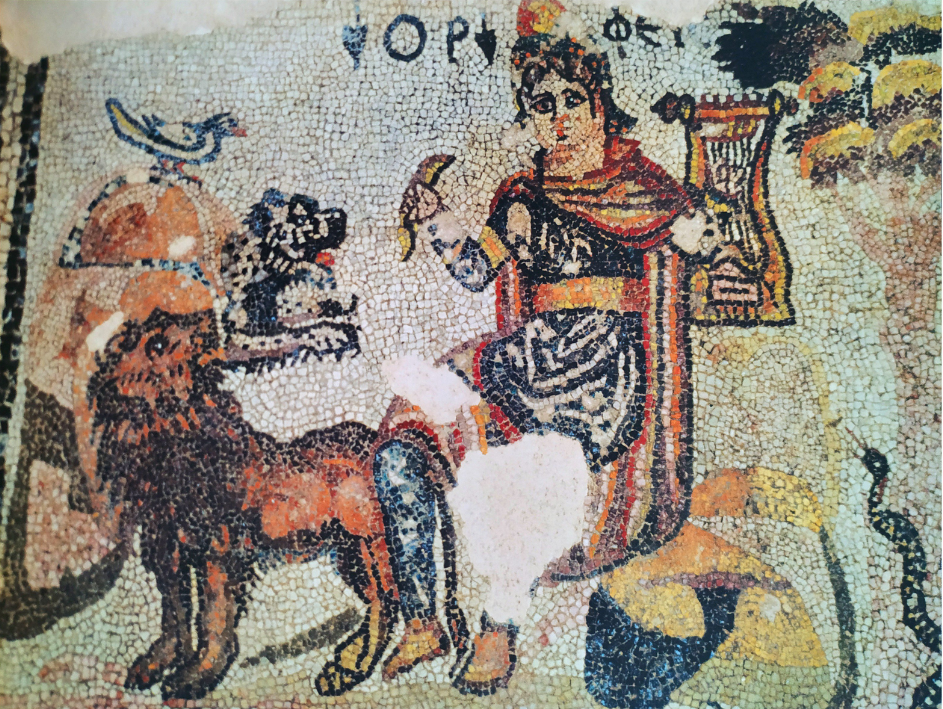
Roman Orpheus mosaic found in the ancient locality of Vendenis (now Gllamnik)

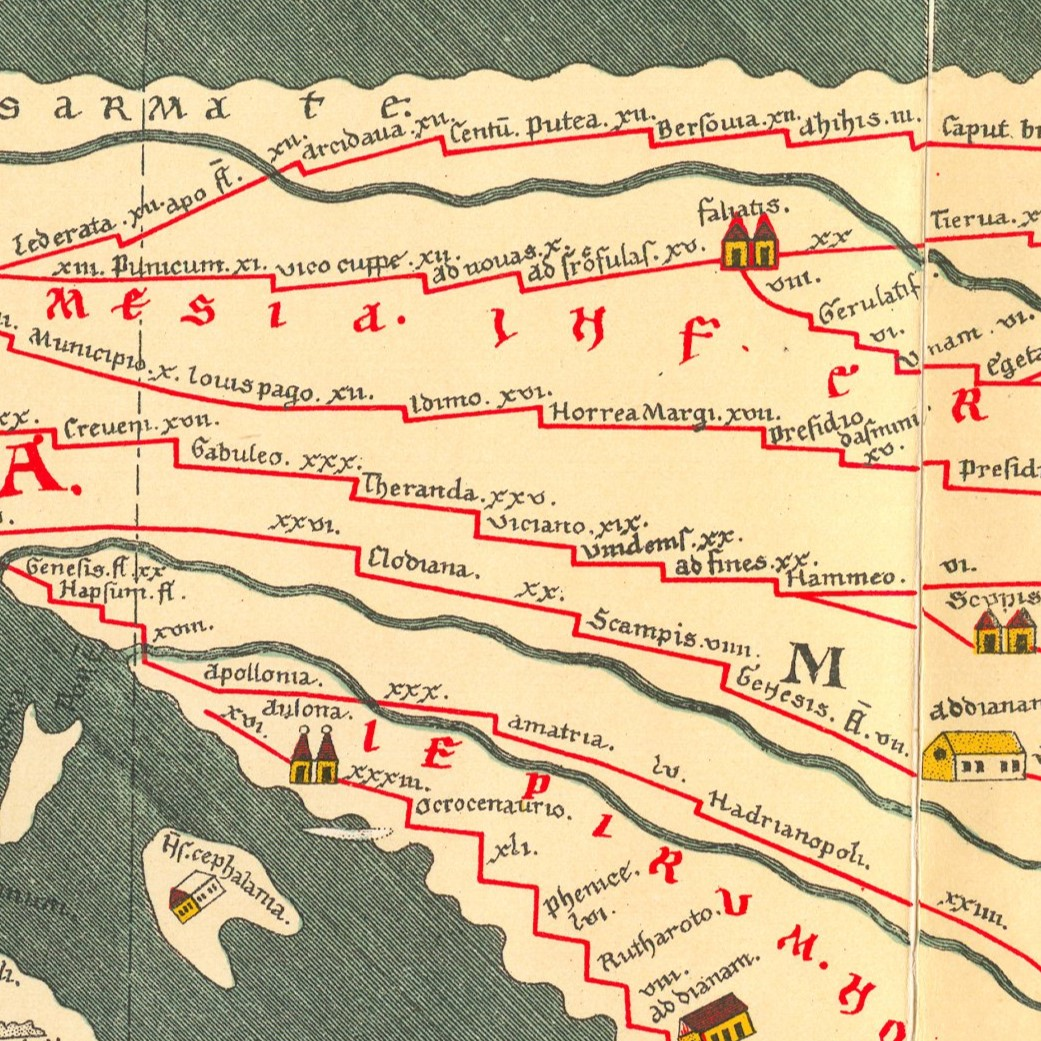
Vendenis shown centrally in the Tabula Peutingeriana, alongside Theranda and Viciana

In the year 395, this territory falls under the rule of the Byzantine Empire.

=== Middle Ages ===
Towards the end of the 9th century, the region of Llapi falls under Bulgarian rule, whose king was Knyaz Boris I. At the end of the 12th century and the beginning of the 13th century Byzantine rule weakened.

The region includes many Medieval Serbian monuments. In 1355, Emperor Stefan Dušan gave the village of Braina to Mount Athos. In 1381, Prince Lazar gave Orlane (a village in Podujevë) to his endowment, the Ravanica monastery. Ruins of old Serbian monasteries and churches exist at Orlane, Murgula (destroyed in the 15th century), Palatna, Slatina, Svetlje, Rakinica, Metohija (2), Donje Ljupce (destroyed in the 15th century), Gornja Pakastica (destroyed in the 15th century), Brevnik, Braina (3) and graveyards exist in most of these villages. The village of Brevnik had a notable medieval mine, and a fort with a church. Albanians are cited in the middle of the 14th century as miners and farmers while Albanian toponyms have been recorded in the area since the 15th century.

=== Ottoman period ===
Podujevë remained under Ottoman Rule from 1455 to 1912. Podujevë was initially organized as a Nahije, and it was the largest one of Vushtrria. During the 15th to 18th centuries, Ottomans attempted to develop agriculture, farming, vineyards, beekeeping and handicrafts within the region. Mining activities were also present, especially in Bellasica, which was recognized as one of the most important mining areas in the Balkans.

In the defter of jizya in 1485, Llapi had 5,952 Christian families, while in 1488-1489 Llapi had 7,399 households. In the 18th century the Nahije of Llapi was part of Pristina's Sanjak. At this time, Llapi lost many residents due to two plagues that struck the place. During the Austro-Ottoman war, the Austrian army destroyed and robbed the town twice. Later, the region fought against the Ottomans. During the Serbian Revolution, the Serbian rebels got into the village of Reçica and killed 30 people, including Demë Ahmeti, an Albanian national hero who is later mentioned in songs. This happened on 28 June 1811, during the feast of Eid.

Podujevë was part of the Vilayet of Kosovo during 1867–1912

A rebellion against the Ottomans arose when Sultan Abdulmejid I proclaimed the Tanzimat reforms in 1839, which increased taxes and brought about many rebellions in Albanian-populated lands. The population of Llapi fought against these reforms and, during 1843, the Ottomans temporarily left Llapi to organize its reoccupation. The rebels gathered many soldiers from the surrounding regions and they beat the Ottomans, taking Pristina and encouraging a bigger rebellion in other regions. The rebellion was extinguished in 1847.

When Serbia acquired the Sanjak of Nis in 1877, many Albanians were expelled from their homes in Niš and the surrounding regions, and Llapi was one of their first destinations as they settled in Kosovo. There is not a single village in Podujevë where Muhaxhirs or migrants cannot be found. Furthermore, they established new villages.

The Albanians of Llapi, since the League of Prizren, refused to pay taxes to the Ottomans. The Ottomans built a military cantonment during 1892 and 1899 as they detected Serbian Army movements near the border.

The Albanian rebellion against Ottomans during 1906 was primarily organized in the Llapi region. Another Albanian rebellion was that of 1910 which also started in the Llapi region. The relationships between the residents and The Sublime Porte were becoming very strained and when Sulltan Mehmed Reshid V came to visit Kosovo and very few Llapi residents were present. Llapi is also known for its cooperation with Isa Boletini, who, during 1911, operated around this zone. Many soldiers from the villages of Llapi and Gallapi promised their loyalty to Isa Boletini in 1912, in the Bradash pledge. Their goal was to initiate the general Albanian rebellion against Ottoman Rule and they were part of the rebellion until it ended.

=== 1912 until World War I ===
When the neighbouring countries formed the Balkan League, Albanians felt at risk of being subjugated to these nations. Serbian forces engaged the border region where 16,000 Albanians were placed. The largest battle was fought in Merdare and lasted three days, where the Serbian army had up to 70.000 soldiers. Soon they took Merdare and the war continued in other fronts. From that time on, the region remained under Serbian control. Llapi remained a region of Pristina. In 1913, Llapi numbered 27,081 residents, while 10 years beforehand, 38,520 residents were present. On 20 August 1914, Serbia announced a decree in which the colonisation of its newly acquired territories was planned. This, and the process of disarmament of the local population, were key factors to the rise of the Kaçak guerilla movement.

=== World War I and World War II ===
During the First World War, most of the Serbian army, led by the Serbian king Peter I, retreated through the Llapi region. During the retreat, war crimes (including robbing, killing and destruction of property) took place. Llapi was later taken by Bulgaria, which, from time to time, organized grain and cattle requisition. Starting from 1916, any people were deported and sent to work in different countries, most of them never returning. After the Bulgarian surrender, Bulgarian soldiers killed a lot of people and robbed many places during their retreat. Albanians would later form their own military formations for a short period of two months.

The region fell to Yugoslavian Kingdom. In the beginning, the Llapi region had 12 municipalities with 27.084 residents. Later, the number of municipalities was reduced. From 1929 to 1941, Podujevë was part of the Morava Banovina of the Kingdom of Yugoslavia; between the two World Wars, Albanians living in the region had no political rights. They were poor and heavily taxed, and corruption was evident in the administration. The main problem, however, was the Yugoslav colonisation of Kosovo, which Yugoslavia disguised as "agricultural reforms". The Albanian language was not used at all in public administration and schools. Many residents were forced to migrate to Turkey, while their land was given to Serbian and Montenegrin colonists who would eventually take 62% of infields. Even mosques were controlled by the state.

Armed resistance was mostly pushed by the Kachak Movement, since it was impossible to organize large groups of people. They managed to expel the Serbian colonists, but the consequences were far greater, as in the beginning of 1921 many massacres against the Albanian population would occur. In Sharban, 35 people were killed and 28 houses were burned. In Bellopoja, 40 people were killed and 57 houses were damaged. In Keqekolla, 490 people were killed and 40 houses were burned. In Prapashtica, 1011 people were killed and 80 houses were burned, in Nishevc, 150 heads of cattle were robbed. In Orllan, 14 people were killed, in Kushevica over 12 people were killed, in Repë over 12 people were killed, and in Popovë 573 people were killed and 55 houses were burned. In Velikoreka, 2 houses were burned, while in Gerdoc 27 people were killed and 2 houses were burned. In Lupç, 11 people were killed, and in Lepaja, 5 houses were burned.

From 1912 to 1918, around 8,000 Albanians were forced to leave their lands to migrate to Turkey, while during 1920–1924,280 Albanian families were also forced to leave. In contrast, 420 Slavic families were settled in the territory between 1920 and 1928, and by 1932, 3,474ha of land were given to colonists and 756 houses were built.

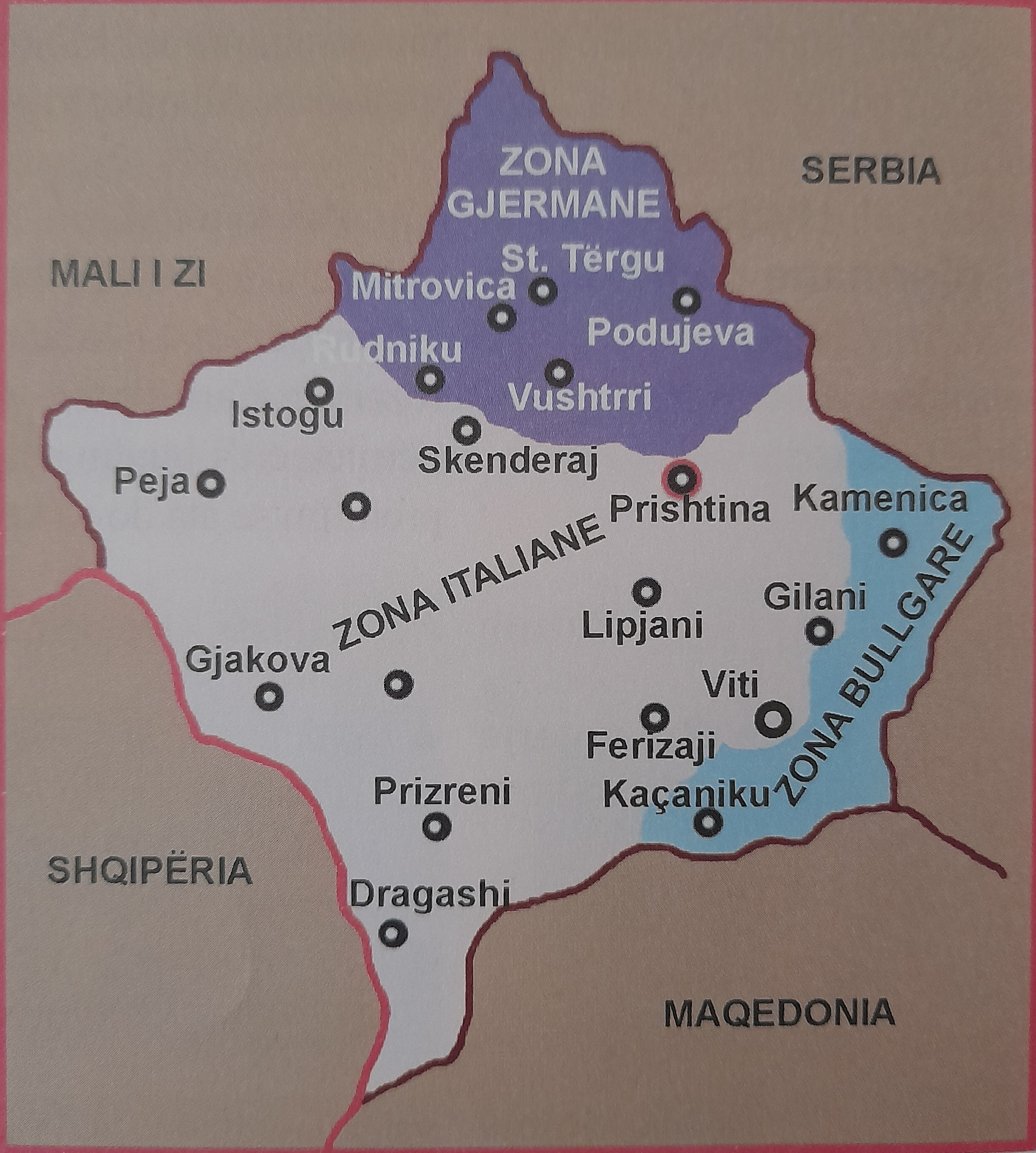
Kosovo during World War II was split in three occupational zones: Bulgarian, Italian and German. Podujevë was part of the German occupation zone

During World War II, Llapi was taken by the German army. The residents of Llapi did not submit to Serbian conscription and fled to the mountains. Germany captured Podujevë with an army including two tanks. Under the German administration, this region was called Llapi's nenprefektura.

Albanians requested that the authorities unify Albanian-inhabited regions under one administration, but this did not occur. During that time, all of Llapi had 42,942 residents. At the end of World War II, Serbia, Germany and Bulgaria were struggling for control of the town. There were greater numbers of military troops around Podujevë than there were residents. The residents later fled to Pristina in a 5 km convoy during October 1944. Earlier, the Germans gave Jahja Fusha authority of the town. 5,000 Albanian soldiers fought to protect the town against Serbians and Bulgarians alike. The fighting ended on 8 November 1944, after a long battle. The residents were required to come back to the town, and afterwards, some 500 men were killed without trial. 10 places are recorded to be mass graveyards. During World War II, Albanians looted and demolished the Serbian church in Podujevo. Cemeteries were destroyed, and Albanians fired rifles through the church. Starting from December 1994, Albanians were conscripted and sent to fight in other part of Yugoslavia.

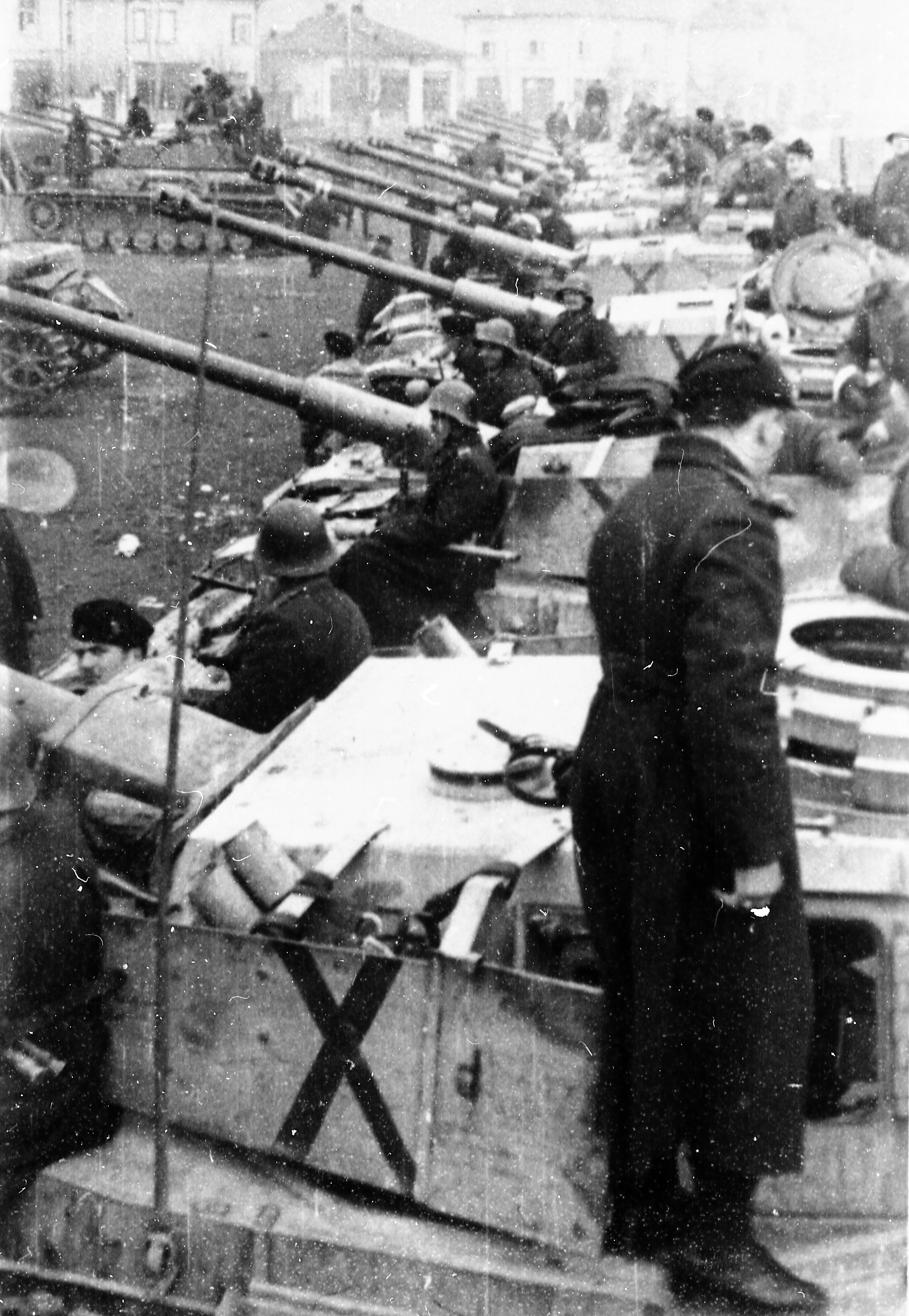
Bulgarian armored brigade in November 1944 in Podujevë, during the Kosovo Operation

=== After World War II ===
After World War II, the Llapi region was incorporated into Yugoslavia. Serbian administration collected 11,297,067 dinars under the guise of it being a punishment for the illegal enrichment of some locals. During 1950–1955, the Yugoslav authorities founded many directorates. When the constitution of 1963 was approved, the municipalities were in a better situation. In 1966, Podujevë had 58,604 citizens.

The economic situation deteriorated after changes by Serbian authorities in 1990. Prior to this, Yugoslavia's five-year plan of 1981-1985 did not offer a viable solution to the economic problems of the region's residents. During 1981–1991, 51 ethnic Albanian soldiers were wrongfully murdered during their service in the Yugoslavian army. In 1981, demonstrations were organized in Pristina, which was later followed by massive demonstrations all around Kosovo. The town of Podujevë was locked down at this time, except for the Medical Center. The route near the border was blocked, and so was the route to Pristina. Some local police were shot while driving tanks. Thousands of people were imprisoned.

Under Serbian control, Albanians were organized into several political parties such as "NDSh", or Albanian National Democratic Party, the Albanian Youth National Democratic Committee, The Albanian League and others. Demonstrations were organized in March 1989 and 1990. During this period, many workers were fired from their jobs and funding for educational institutions was halted. This continued for a while, but Albanians had organized private funds themselves so that the education process would not stop. During 1989–1997, 22 people were killed in the region. These actions motivated the Albanian populations to resolve their societal disputes. During 1990–1992, 114 bloodfeud issues and 60 other disputes were resolved.

In 20 March 1990, Podujevë was the site of the first affected school from the student poisoning attack that took place in Kosovo. Around 8,000 students were poisoned from this incident.

One of the founders and the first commanders of the Kosovo Liberation Army, Zahir Pajaziti, was born in Podujevë. He and his associates began the first actions against Serbian police, before he was caught in an ambush near the village of Pestovë, resulting in his death.

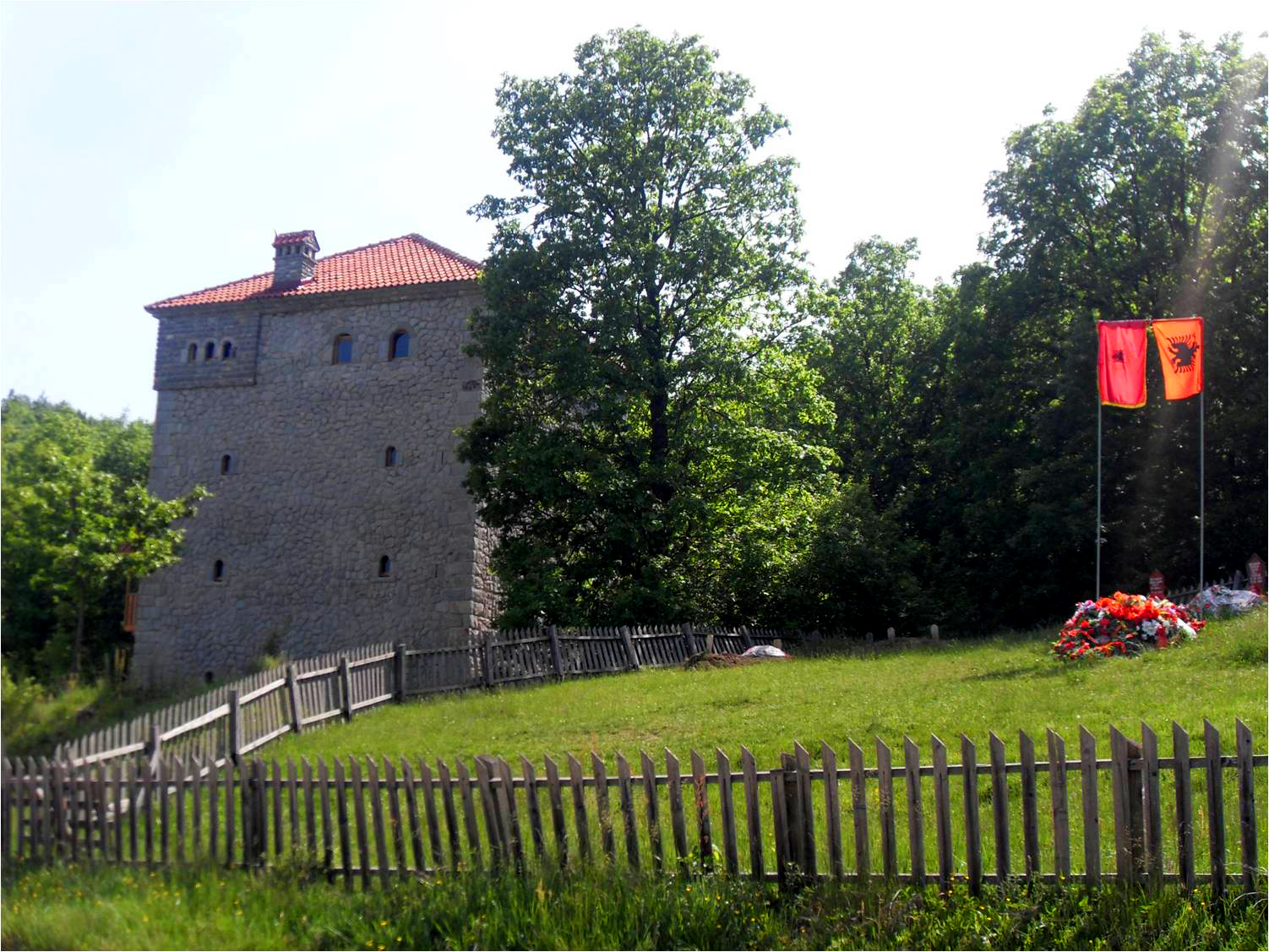
Kulla of Zahir Pajaziti, commander of Kosovo Liberation Army, born in Podujevë. He is known as the "First Gun of Freedom."

=== Kosovo War ===
During the Kosovo War (February 1998 – June 1999), the town was the site of the Podujevë massacre, on 28 March, in which 14 Albanian women and children were executed by Serbian paramilitary forces. Serbian forces reportedly were continuing to burn villages east and southeast of this town as of 5 April. Serbian forces allegedly executed 200 Kosovar Albanian men of military age. In addition, Serbian forces reportedly removed ethnic Albanians from their cars and shot them on the spot. Ninety percent of the buildings in the town reportedly have been burned. On 19 April, Serbian forces allegedly used ethnic Albanians as human shields along the road between Podujevë and Pristina.

The city was part of the subdivision of Kosovo Liberation Army (KLA), called ZOLL (Albanian: Zona Operative e Llapit, lit. 'Operational area of Llapi'). This city became a battleground during the conflict, in which the Battle of Podujevë was fought. The battle ended in a ceasefire called on by foreign forces.

The road coming into Podujevë from the city of Niš was the site of the 2001 Podujevë bus bombing, in which a bus carrying Serb pilgrims traveling to the Gračanica monastery site was bombed. Twelve Serb pilgrims were killed and dozens more were injured by the bomb-blast. Kosovo Albanian extremists have been blamed for the attack.

After the Kosovo War, the process of establishing a Municipal Assembly began in 2002. Later, on 17 February 2008, Kosovo declared its independence.

== Geography ==
Podujevë is located in the northeastern part of Kosovo and it is closely connected to the surrounding regions through a network of regional motorways and railways. Just 31 kilometers (19 miles) to the south lies Pristina, the capital of Kosovo. To the west, Podujevë shares its borders with Obiliq, Vushtrri, Mitrovica and Leposaviq, while its northern and eastern borders share a border with Serbia.

Podujevë consists of Llapi's Hollow and the Albanik mountains in the west, and eastern Kosovo's mountains in the east. Llapi's valley is placed between the village of Repa and that of Barileva with a 35 km distance and between Batllavë and Llapashticë e Epërme with 12–15 km. Llapi's jaw is located between Repë and Murgull (14 km) and from Bellasica to Uglar's Cape (14 km). Gallapi is placed between Batllavë and Metergoc in latitude and from Turuçicë to Koliq in longitude.

Highest point of Podujevë is 1,779 m (5,837 ft) located in the Kopaonik Mountains, while the lowest is 550 m (1,804 ft), and is located where the Llapi River leaves Podujevë to continue in Pristina. Since its territory is compact, it represents a microgeographical entirety.

=== Hydrology ===
Podujevë counts several ravines, water springs and rivers. The most notable river is Llapi, the main branch of Sitnica, which runs through the middle of Podujevë, springing from the Albanik mountains. The source of Llapi considered to be the Pollatë village where the rivers of Murgulla and Sllatinë are joined. In the upper part of it, the river runs through steep places but when it enter Llap's hollow, its speed is moderated. Llapi river is 82.7 km (51 mi) long up to Sitnica river while most of the river passes through Podujevë's territory, in a 61 km (38 mi) length. This river is wide from 9 to 12 meters and deep up to 1.2 meters. The river brings an average of 4.9 m^{3} (173 cu ft) per second, however, there are considerable variations with the maximum going up to 25 m^{3} (883 cu ft) per second.

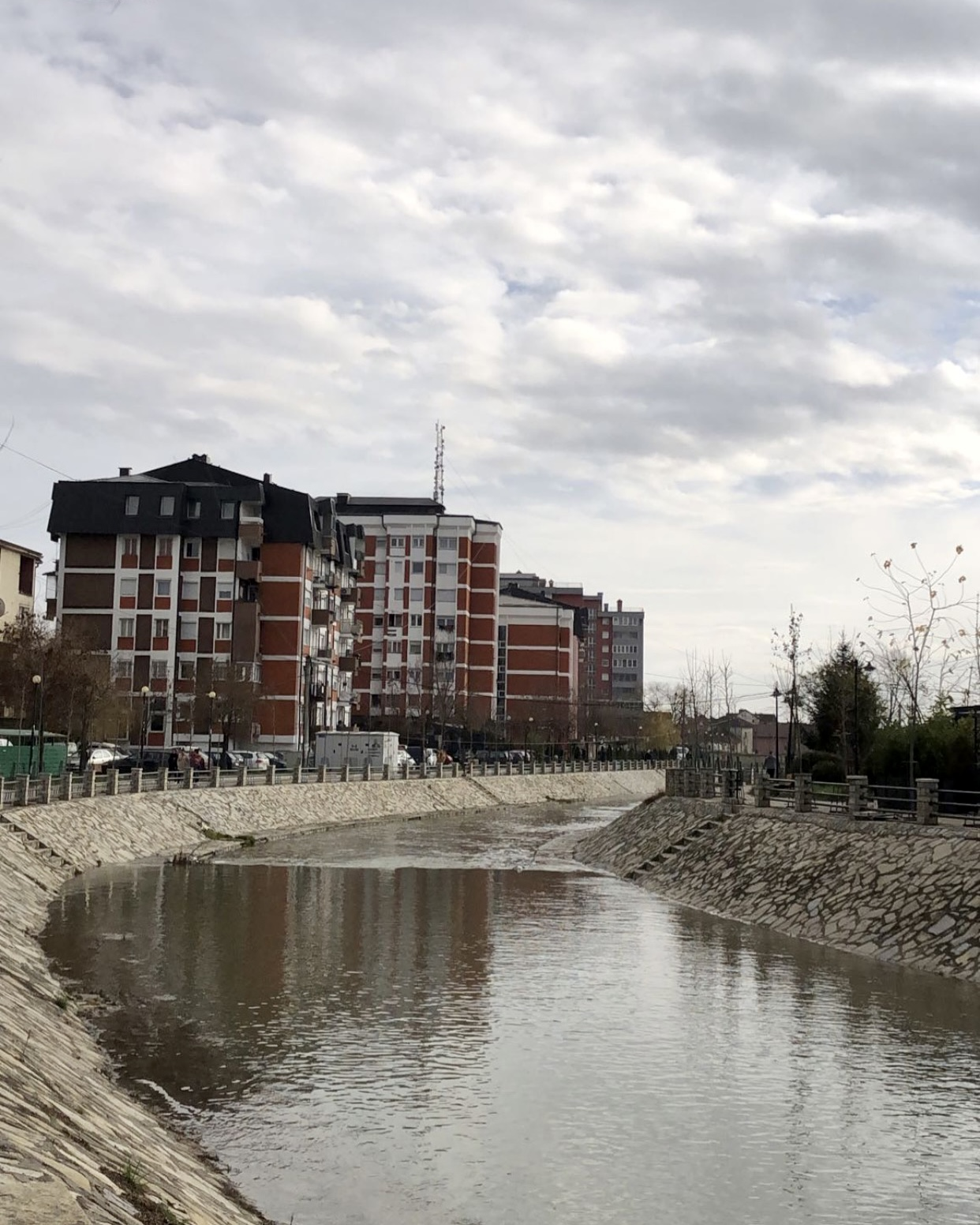
Llapi is the river that flows through the city and it has a total length of 72 km (45 mi)

There are other rivers also. Dumnica river is 25.5 km (16 mi) long and fills 87 km^{2} and it is used for irrigating. Kaçandolli river is Llapi's most important right branch and it is 32.5 km (20 mi) long, filling 193.6 km2. The Batllava River fills 315 km^{2} and it also flows into Llapi.

In 1965 a dam 40.5 m (133 ft) high was built in order to form the Batllava Lake, which can handle up to 40 million m^{3} of water and was primary built for KEK needs, to be used later for consuming purposes.

=== Climate ===
Podujevë has a medium continental climate. The climate is influenced by microclimatic factors that give some small specifics to this space. Among the microclimatic factors, the most important are the Llapi field and the mountains that surround it from all sides. The effect of mountains is that they have more precipitation, lower temperatures, snow stays longer, are covered with forests, etc. So, Podujevë is somewhat colder than in other cities of Kosovo. The average temperature in Podujevë is 9.6 ̊C. The amplitude is 64.2 ̊C.

Month	Coldest/warmest month	Lowest/highest temperature
January	-2.1 ̊C	-27.2 ̊C
August	20.1 ̊C	37.0 ̊C

The annual rate of precipitation is lower than that of Kosovo (784 mm (30.87 in)) with 697 mm (27.44 in) of raining per year. The most humid month is May with 77.5 mm (3.05 in) and the driest month is March with 42.3 mm (1.67 in). The average snow fall days are 26 while days with snow mantle are 48.4. The maximum layer of snow is recorded to be 96 cm (38 in), while the month with a maximum of snow mantle days is February with 11.7 days. The length of the day in Podujevë varies significantly over the course of the year. In 2022, the shortest day is 21 December, with 9 hours, 1 minute of daylight; the longest day is 21 June, with 15 hours, 21 minutes of daylight.

=== Flora and Fauna ===
Podujevë counts 29,050 acres of forests most of which are located in the western and northern part of its territory. 17,600 ha are under state control and the rest (11,450) are under private control. Since the woods remain the main warming option of Kosovars, degradation and wood cuts remain a challenge. The trees which are found in this zone include: beech (fagus sylvatica), hornbeam (carpinus orientalis) and ash-tree. In alluvial lands osier and poplar may be found but other trees are found also. There may be found bushes such as cornel bush (Cornus Mas), haw (crataegus monogyna), canker-rose (rosa canina), elder (sambocus nigra), gooseberry (prunus spicosa), hazelnut (corylus avellana) etc.

Fauna has many species that are not only characteristic of these areas. In the forests live: gray wolf, wild boar, fox, European hare, European hedgehog, etc. Recently, not only in this area, the roe deer has started to appear, which was once quite widespread. There are many species of birds such as the great tit, the rock dove, the great spotted woodpecker, the Eurasian magpie, the common cuckoo, etc. Birds of prey that have been seen in the municipality are the golden eagle and the common kestrel. And some of the migratory birds are swallows, storks etc.

The grass snake (natrix natrix), the horned viper (vipera ammodytes), boletus (tropidonatus natrix), vineyard snail (helix pomatia), common turtle (testudo hermanni) live in the rivers. There are several types of fish, in the Llapi River also, in the upper part it was once quite rich with brook trout (barbus barbus) that lives in fast and cold waters, stream catfish, bream, mullet, bream, carp (cyprinus carpio), northern pike (esox lucius), common rudd etc.

=== Natural Monuments ===
In Podujevë, there are a number of natural monuments which were recognized as valuable resources. The list includes:

Object	Locality	Type
Kaqanolli's Jaw	Kaqanoll	Locality of special interest
"Ushton Reka"	Popovë	Locality of special interest
Batllava Lake	Batllavë	Locality of special interest
Vrella	Dobratin	Water resources
Water Resource	Kalatica	Water resources
Populus sp	Murgull	Botanic Monument
Juglans regia	Murgull	Botanic Monument
Fagus	Dobratin	Botanic Monument
Quercus sp.	Obrançë	Botanic Monument
Quercus sp.	Llapashticë e Epërme	Botanic Monument
Quercus sp.	Llapashticë e Epërme	Botanic Monument
Quercus sp.	Livadicë	Botanic Monument
Populus sp.	Orllan	Botanic Monument
Quercus sp.	Kunushec	Botanic Monument
Quercus sp.	Lluzhan	Botanic Monument
Quercus sp.	Dyz	Botanic Monument
Populus sp.	Gërdoc	Botanic Monument
Quercus sp.	Halabak	Botanic Monument

== Demographics ==
Municipal historical population
Year	Pop.	±% p.a.
1948	41,834	—
1953	46,317	+2.06%
1961	51,516	+1.34%
1971	60,349	+1.60%
1981	75,437	+2.26%
1991	92,946	+2.11%
2011	88,499	−0.24%
2024	70,975	−1.68%

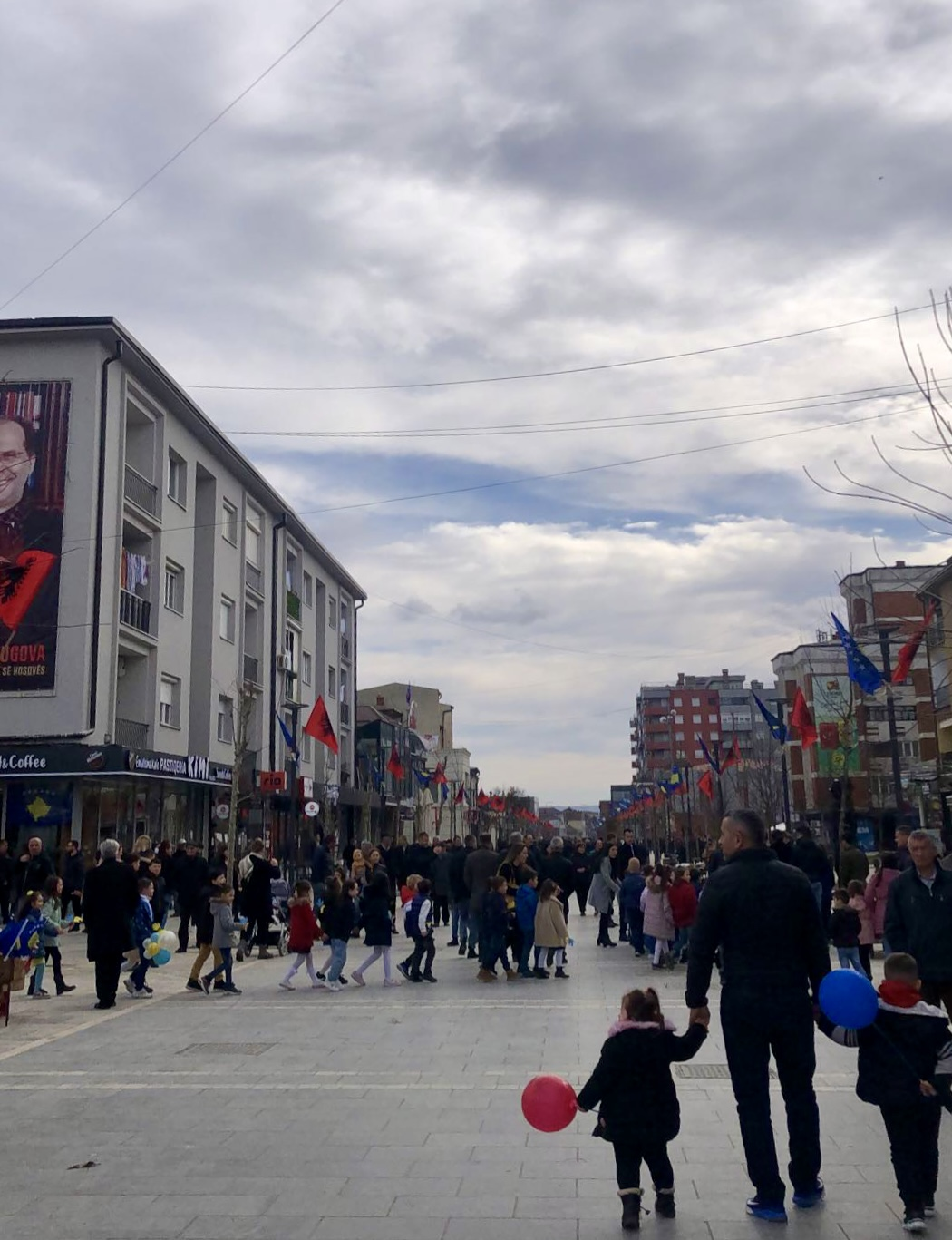
Albanians in Podujevë celebrating Kosovo's Independence Day (2022)

The municipality of Podujevë has 70,975 inhabitants according to the 2024 census, compared to 88,499 in 2011. In the same year, the urban population numbered 23,453 citizens and the rural 65,046.

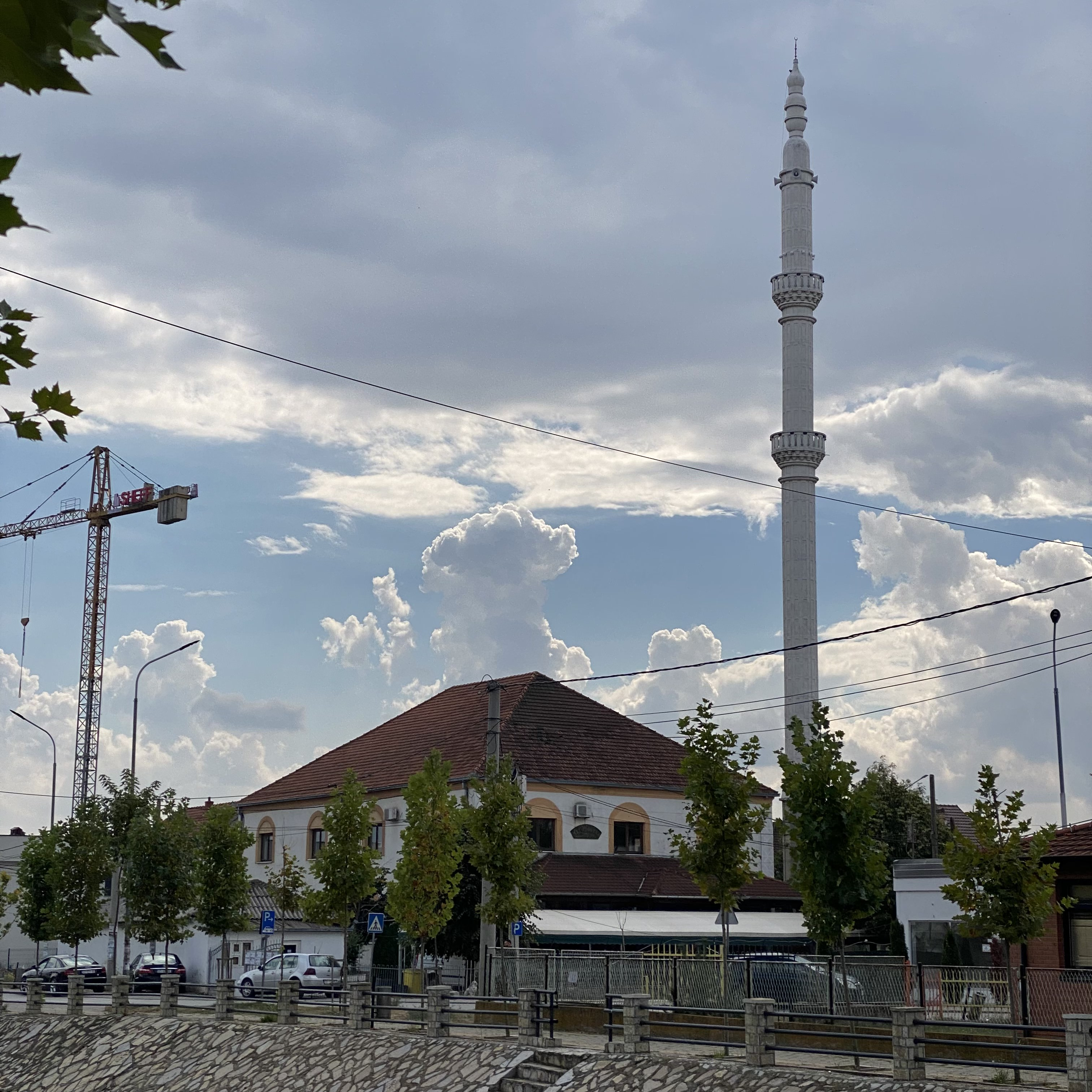
Met Podujevë Mosque is one of the mosques located in the city

Also in 2011, the highest population density was in the city of Podujevë, where it numbered 2,635/km^{2}. Several other settlements also had high density, such as Letanc (660/km^{2}), Obrançë (529/km^{2}), Surkish (500/km^{2}), Llugë (444/km^{2}), Gllamnik (405/km^{2}) and others. The settlements with the lowest population density were Rakinicë (3/km^{2}), Tërnavicë (4/km^{2}) and Metergoc (5/km^{2}), while Muhazob, Përpellac and Reçicë recorded no permanent population.

The town has a low ratio of internal migration but a high rate of commuting. The illiteracy rate is lower than 5%. The average years of schooling is 9.0-9.2. The labor force is smaller than 40.1% of the population, with an employment rate of 20.1% and unemployment of 45-51%. The average household size numbers 6-7 people.

=== Ethnic groups ===
The ethnic composition of the municipality of Podujevë:

Ethnic group	2011 census	in %	2024 census	in %
Albanians	87,523	98.90	70,071	98.73
Ashkali	680	0.77	752	1.06
Romani	74	0.08	56	0.08
Bosniaks	33	0.04	21	0.03
Serbs	12	0.01	15	0.02
Others	50	0.06	40	0.06
Prefer not to say	7	0.01	20	0.02+
Unavailable	120	0.13+	-	-
Total	88,499	100.00	70,975	100.00

=== Religions ===
The religious composition of the municipality of Podujevë:

Religion	2011 census	in %	2024 census	in %
Islam	88,256	99.76	70,484	99.31
Roman Catholicism	14	0.01+	30	0.04
Eastern Orthodoxy	12	0.01	9	0.01
Others	2	0.00+	166	0.23
No religion	1	0.00+	45	0.06
Prefer not to answer	75	0.07+	241	0.35-
Unavailable	139	0.15+	-	-
Total	88,499	100.00	70,975	100.00

The city has an Orthodox Church, an Evangelical Protestant Church, and three Mosques.

== Economy ==
The biggest expansion on the economy of Podujevë occurred during the 1980s. At that time, there were 16 social organizations that have developed their economic activities, with altogether 2,500 employees. The beginning of the 1990s is characterized with a growing of private businesses, in particular in trade and services. During the war of 1999 all of these businesses were destroyed by Serbian military forces, so the period of renewal was long and difficult. After the Kosovo war, the private sector was the main bearer of economical development with a continual growth. According to the Businesses Office, there are around 3,972 registered businesses, mostly in trade section.

=== Agriculture ===
Podujevë is mostly a rural area. Podujevë has extraordinary resources regarding the agriculture field, since there are sufficient lands and water. Historically, the agriculture was cultivated only for family needs, as it has been considered as a secondary sector, but recently it has begun to be used also for other needs and requests, which could be beneficial and profitable.

Other relevant sectors which belong to the agriculture, are: farming, beekeeping, poultry, vegetable, arboriculture, land cultivation, and so forth. Podujevë is especially known for cultivating raspberries, as the climate is perfect for its growth. About 56% is arable land used for agriculture. Pastures make up 16% of the agricultural land and the rest is used for vegetables, orchards, vineyards, etc.

=== Mining ===
From the most common minerals extracted for industrial usage are silicates (Si), carbonates (Ch), gravel (Gs), clay (Cl), nickel (Nl), lead (Pb) zinc (Zn) and aluminum (Al). There is no clear data regarding to the quantity of these reserves.* There are two companies who use surface mineral resources, one in Murgulla and the other one in Turuqica.

=== Industry ===
After the 1999, the development of the secondary sector or industry is accompanied with the development of small and medium enterprises in the production field. Currently, the industry plays an important role in the economical development of Podujevë. There are 116 industrial buildings with 290 employees. Former public enterprises have been privatized. Some of the most important enterprises include: Construction Armory Factory "FAN", Brick Factory "Euro Block", Recycling Enterprise "Plastika", Factory for processing mushrooms "Agro-Product", Factory for production of juices "Dona", Factory for production of juices and vegetable oil "Pajtimi Company", etc.

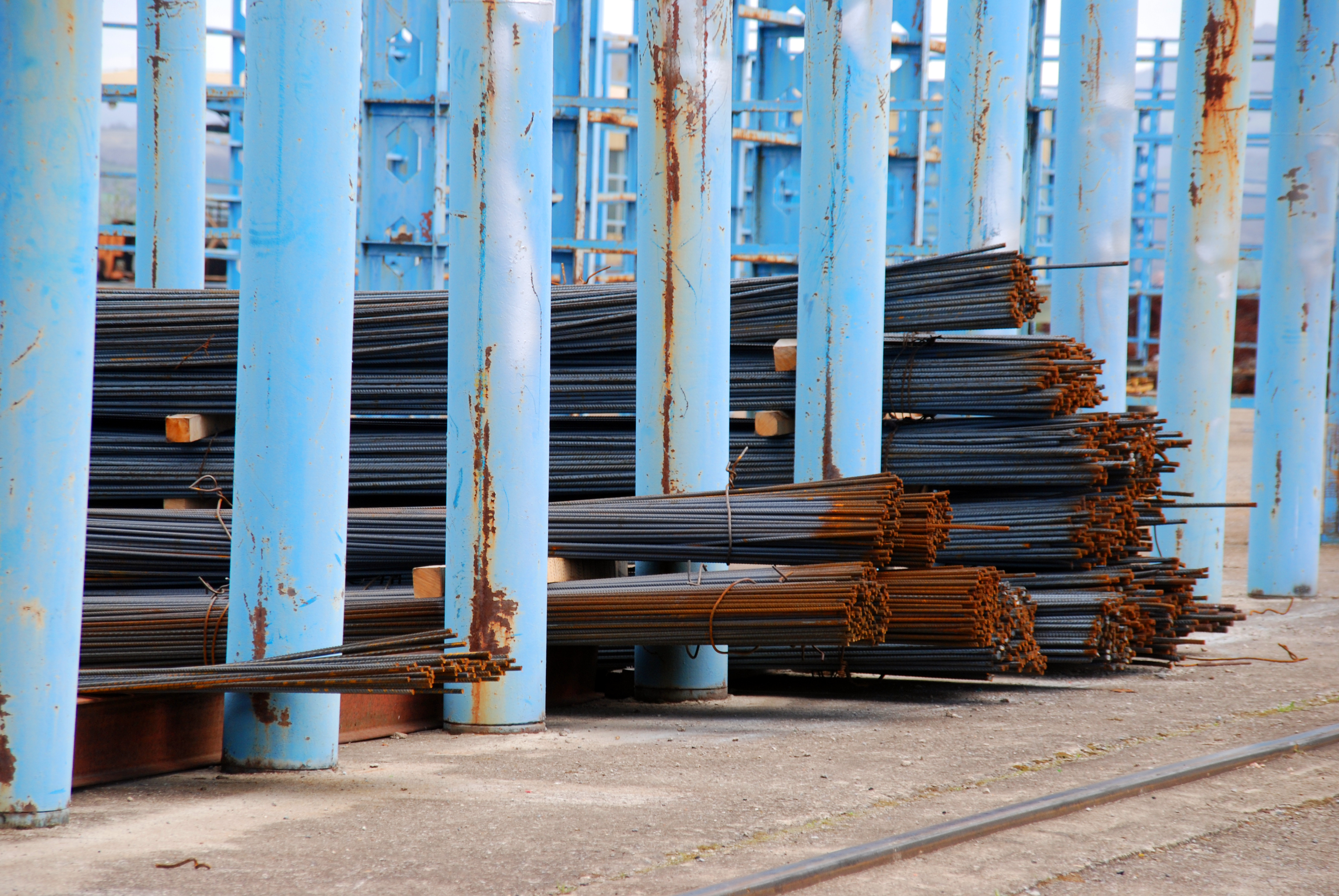
A factory that produces reinforcing bars is one of the factories located in Podujevë

=== Trade ===
Trade take an important place in all businesses from the percentage of participation of enterprises and employees with 53%. Considering some strategic elements, as nearness of the urban center Pristina, streets with national character, and the others advantages have made the trade sector dominant in the last 10 years. In Podujevë, there are 3,972 businesses registered, and in total 6,726 employees.

=== Tourism ===
Podujevë has its potentials concerning the tourism. It is characterized by many and various potentials for development of weekend and rural tourism as well. The geomorphology of Podujevë territory is quite rich. Two massive mountains, such as Albaniku and Gollaku mountains are located in Podujevë. Moreover, the Llapi Valley together with the Llapi River, and Batllava Lake provide incontestable values regarding the tourism.

Batllava Lake
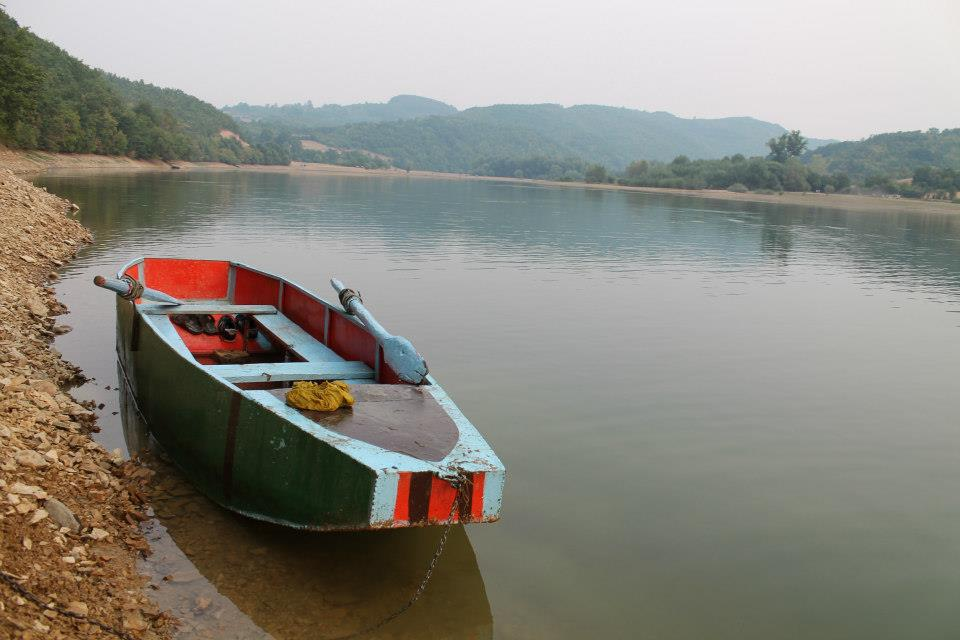
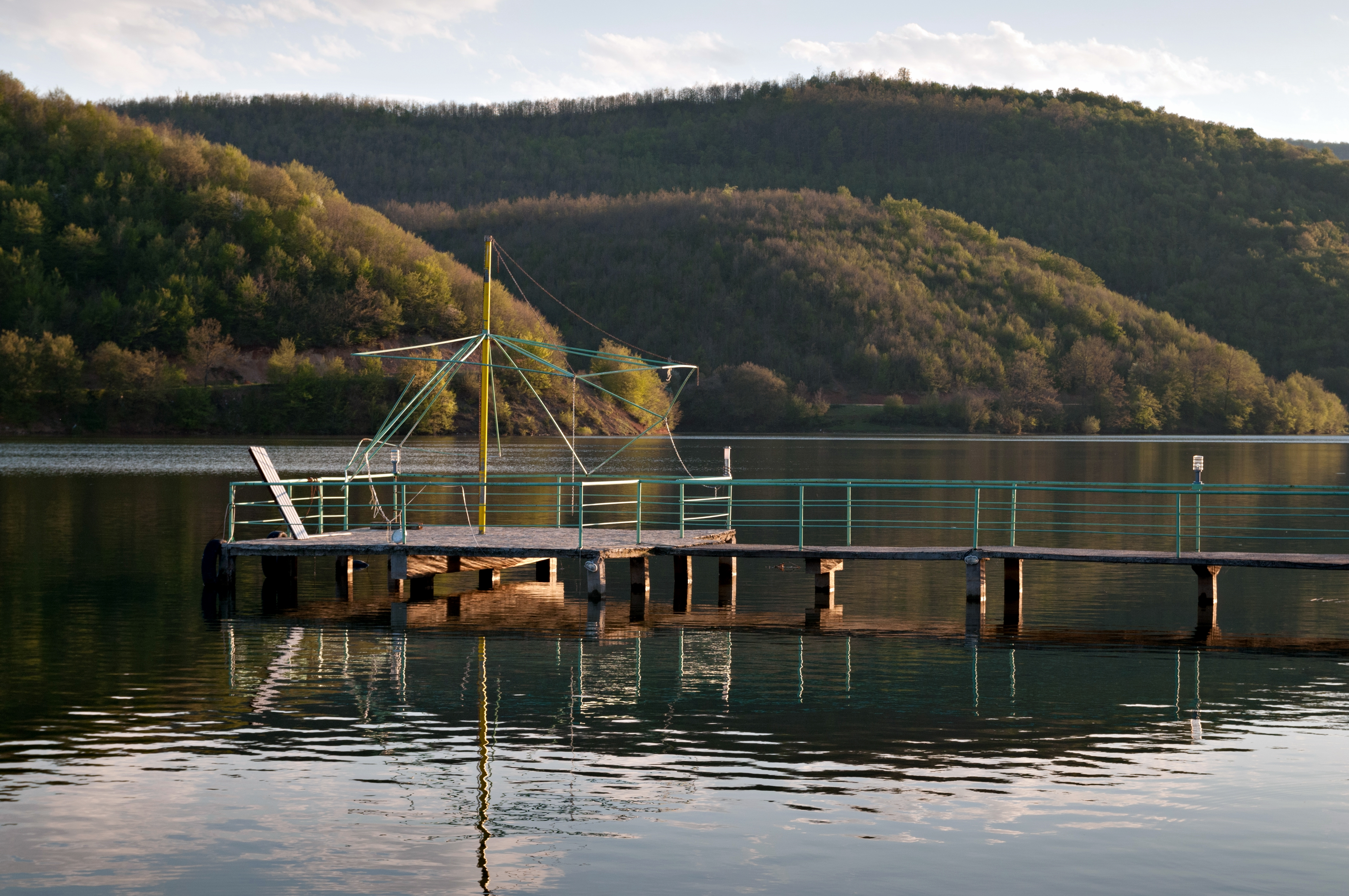
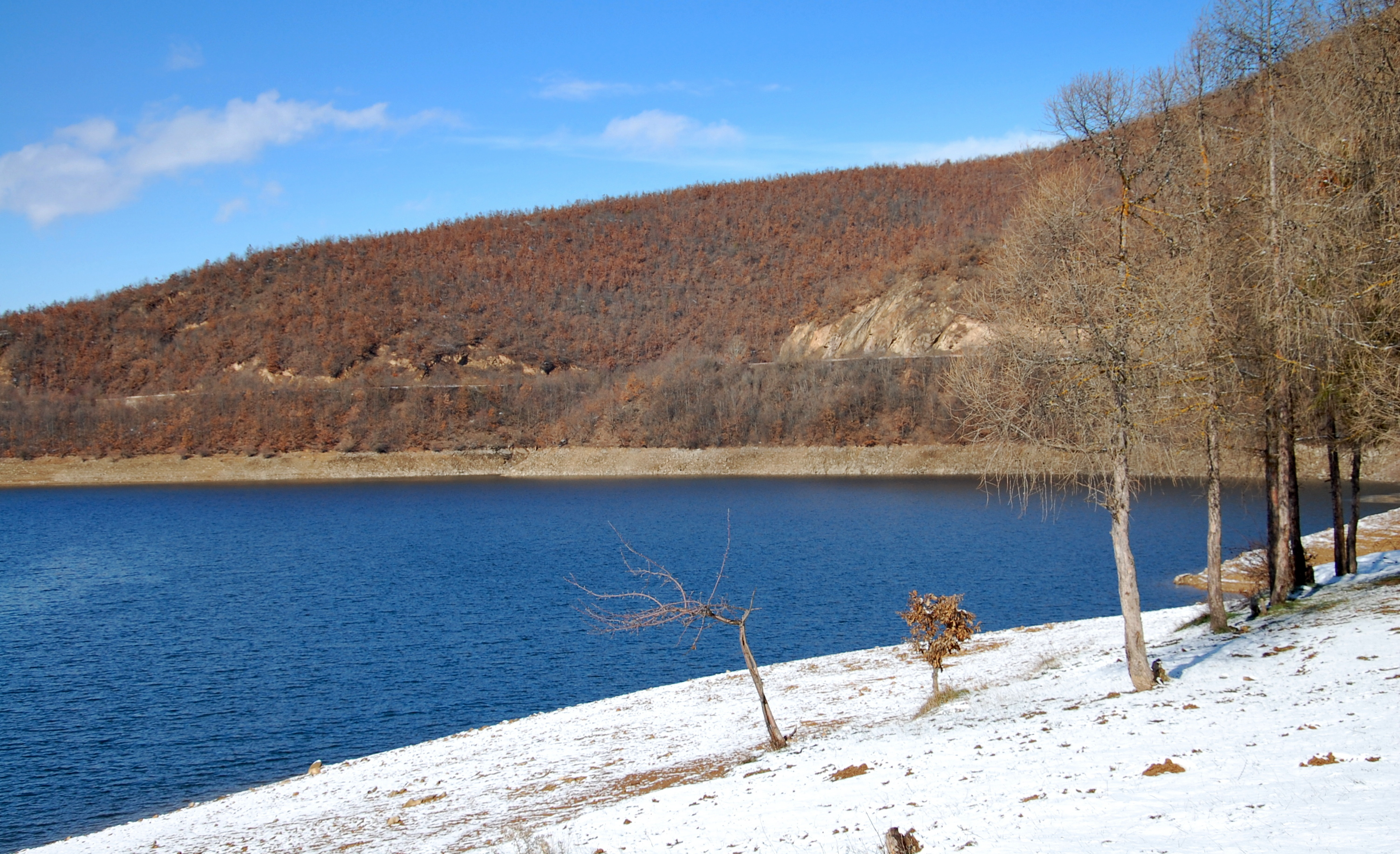
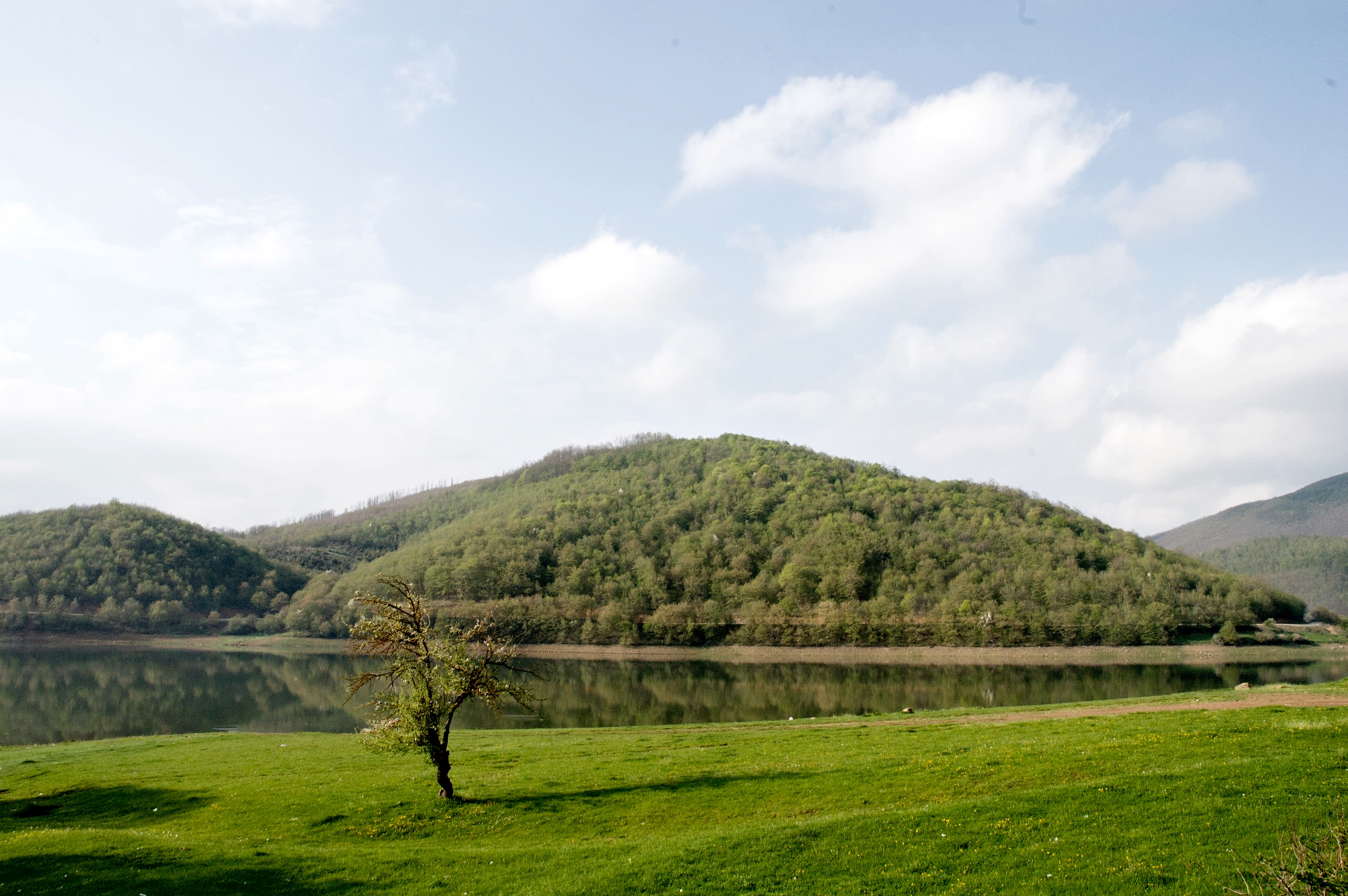

One of the tourist places is Batllava Lake. During the summer season this lake attracts thousand of visitors around Kosovo, who come to spend holidays in spaces, as beaches are offered there. Batllava has six beaches in good condition. These beaches offer spaces for familiar relaxation, which provide the visitors with sandy football and volleyball grounds, and also playgrounds for children. Parkings, floors, umbrellas, sunshades, boats and seats are available around the lake. Other important values which can be found in Podujevë are cultural heritage monuments, created in certain historic periods. The most outstanding monument is the fortress of the national martyr and hero Zahir Pajaziti, called Kulla of Zahir Pajaziti.

Among architectural and cultural monuments of local and national importance are also: Two towers in Hertica, the one of Sali Aga and Ajet Muçolli, Complex in Reçica, the Monument of Tabet Llapashtica, House Museum of the national martyr Hasan Ramadani, and the Tower of Demë Ahmeti. According to the Institute for Protection of the Monuments of Kosovo, the number of monuments in Podujevë is around 60.

== Education ==
Podujevë manages 68 educational objects, including 41 schools. There is only one Daycare Center namely "DRITA", 37 primary schools and 3 high schools. 27 settlements do not have a school at all. There are 1271 people working in the educational system, while the number of students is 20,905 which means that there is a teacher for every 16.44 students.

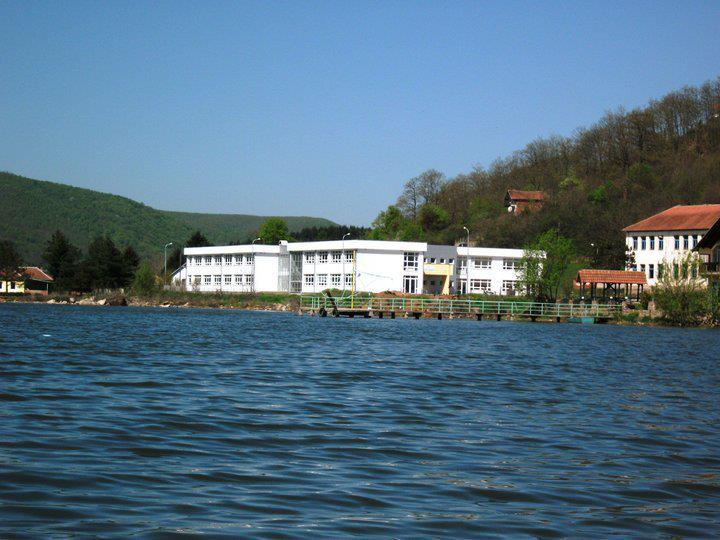
The "Zahir Pajaziti" primary school in Orllan, near Batllava Lake

The condition of the schools is not in the good state since 14 school are in a poor position, while 24 schools need some of basic investments. Seven schools work in three tours while the rest work into or one tour. Is worth mentioning that there is a school in Gllamnik named "Kongresi i Manastirit", which offers a special class for people with disabilities which has 27 students and 2 teachers.

== Culture ==
Podujevë's residents have shown a high interest to contribute for culture, although they did not have the proper conditions to participate. In fact, the requirements for fulfillment of various cultural and art projects are higher in comparison with the conditions offered by the Management of Culture, Youth and Sport. The lack of space and adequate infrastructure have impacted the development of cultural life.

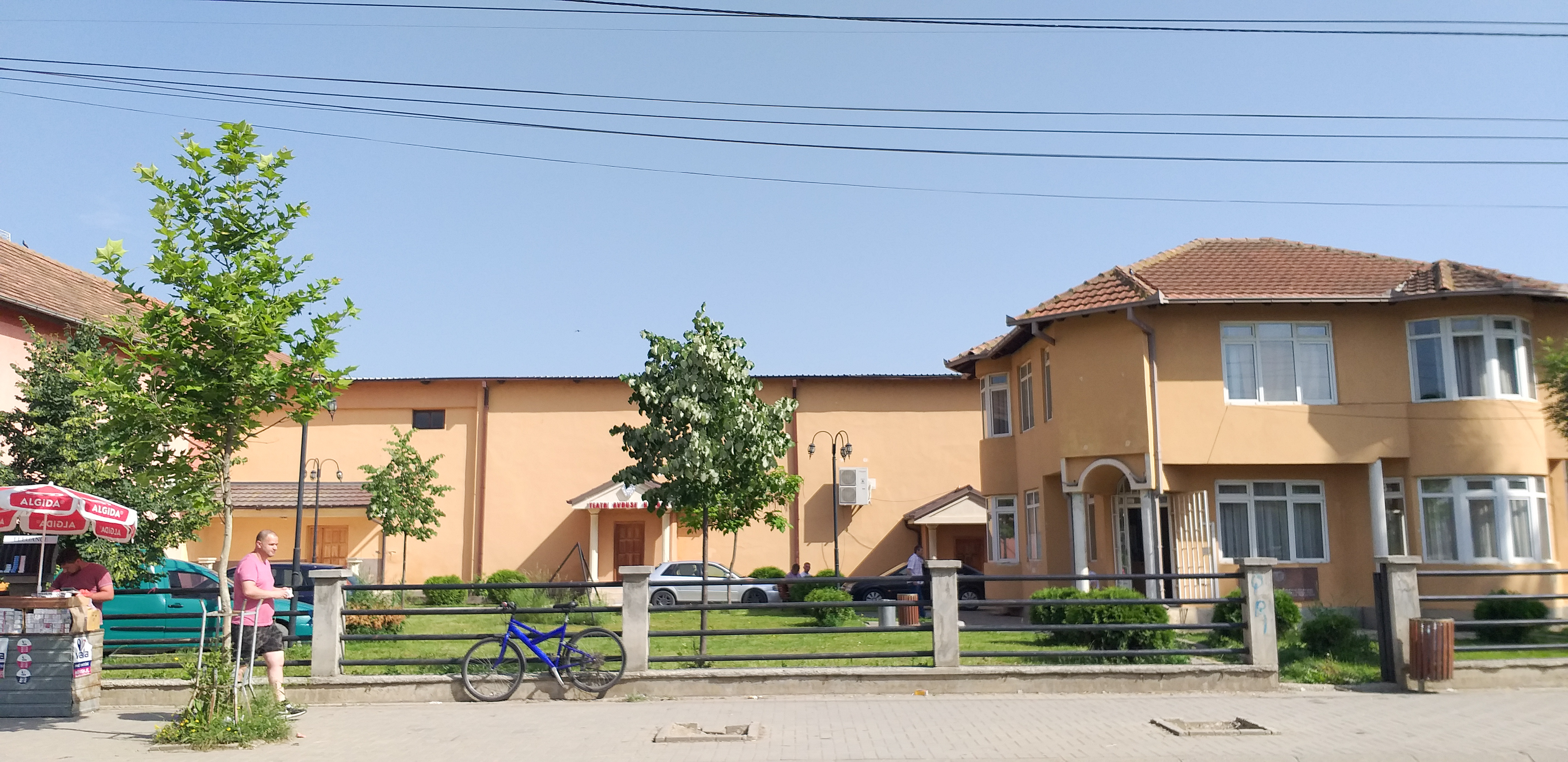
The "Avdush Hasani" theater

A number of organizations and artistic associations focused on drama, comedy, sporting competitions and other cultural activities are located in Podujevë. These activities are organized in the city theater, sport hall with only 800 seats, city stadium, and city library, though there is insufficient space. The city theater has been the most common place of several cultural activities and exhibitions, which has become popular in Podujevë and elsewhere. It was established in 1994. To date, it is the city's most successful artistic institution with major events taking place throughout the year.

The dancing ensemble called "The Downtown Dancers", founded in 2002, are an important part of the cultural life in Podujevë. The group performs traditional folk dances and modern dances. The ensemble has performed internationally along with some folk festivals in Kosovo, and has 50 members.

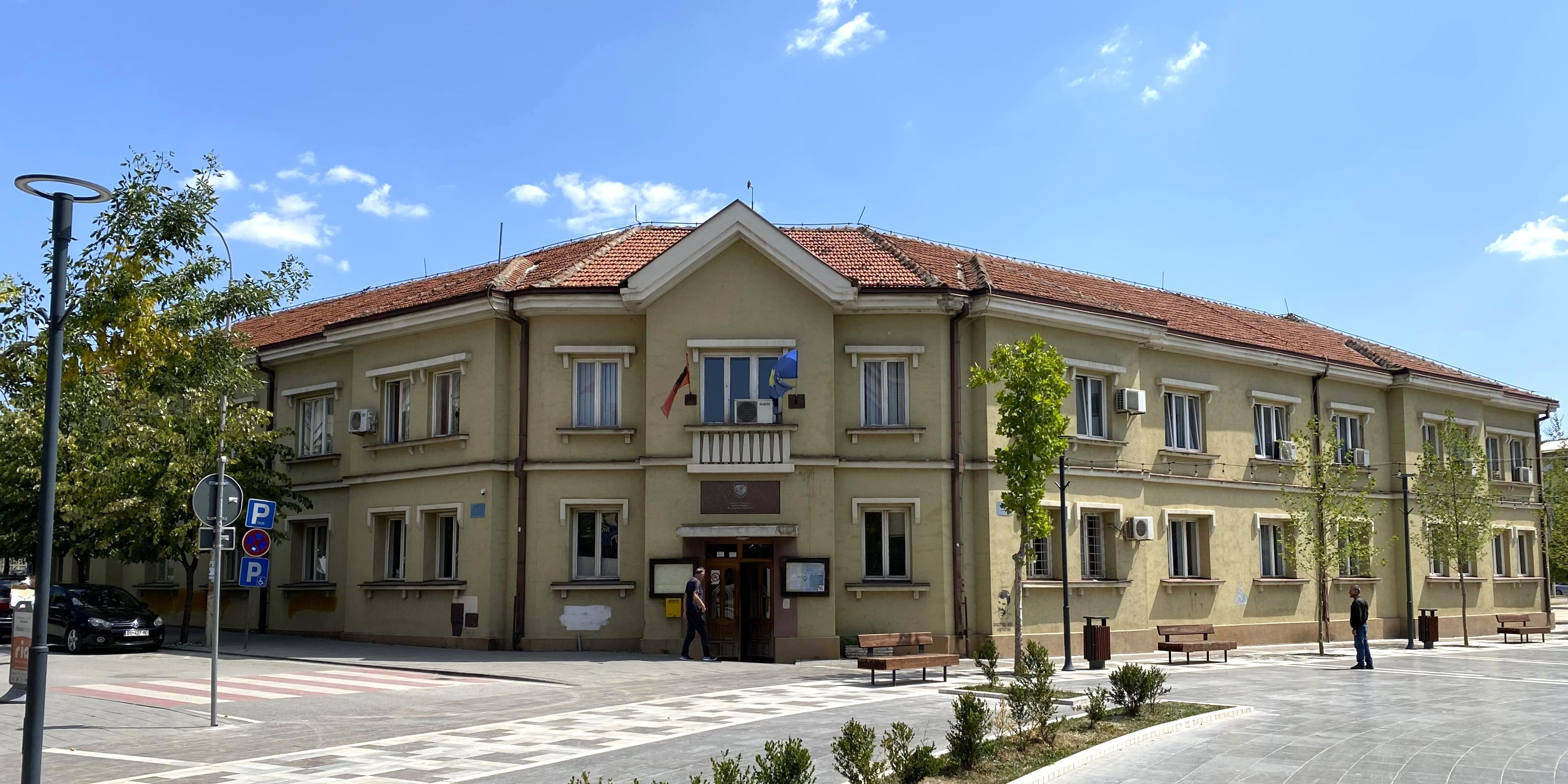
City's library is located in the main square

Prior to 1999, the municipality of Podujevë had a total of 14 public libraries with 143,067 books. During the war period of 1999, 10 libraries were burned by Serb forces, including the city library which contained 124,977 books. After 1999, the municipality had only three libraries with around 18,090 books, though not in good condition. The fund of these copies are mainly in the Albanian language, and a small part consists in the English and German language. Besides the city library, there are two other libraries, one located in Orllan, whereas the other one is in Lluzhan.

There are no local newspapers published in Podujevë. However, there are two radio stations, both of which were founded in 2000. These local radio stations are "Vision Radio" and "Llapi Radio".

=== Cultural-Artistic Society "Josip Rela" ===
The Cultural-Artistic Society "Josip Rela" is a main contributor to the culture of Podujevë. This dancing association was founded in 1966 and has represented Podujevë in different competitions. Its first initiator for the forming of this dramatic group was Bislim Aliu. Some of the famous members of the group were Dr. Abdullah Vokrri, Dr. Rifat Blaku, Mr. Bislim Aliu, Skënder Hyseni, along with others. "Josip Rela" has won a considerable number of prizes.

=== Festivals ===
==== "Teatri Ndryshe" ====
The culture of Podujevë is also characterized through different festivals. One of these festivals is the "Teatri Ndryshe" International Festival. This festival was launched in 2009 and takes place during the summer. It is organized by the Management of Culture, Youth and Sport in Podujevë. Various theatrical groups from Kosovo, Albania, Romania, Bosnia and Herzegovina, and other regional countries participate in this festival with their performances. "Teatri Ndryshe" usually is organized in the city theater and city square.

==== Festival of Literature ====
Another popular and well-known festival not only in Podujevë, but in Kosovo as well, is the international Festival of Literature in Orllan. The Literature Festival was established in 2011 by Batllava Lake, in order to unite various Kosovar artists, writers, musicians, and other artists from regional countries. Writers from the UK, Cyprus, Japan and Syria also take part in the daily sessions. The festival also offers live music performances.

== Sports ==
Podujevë is known for its sporting tradition. Athletes from Podujevë have gone on to play for Kosovar teams as well as international clubs. In the early 1930s horse racing was a popular sport. Horse racing competitions were held under the patronage of the Fusha family. Jahja Fusha, the-then mayor of the municipality was regarded as a formidable athlete.

The first football team was founded in 1928, and was named "Sloga". However, its existence was brief as it folded in 1931.

FC Llapi is the oldest football club in Podujevë and it was founded in 1932 as a member of the Niš Football Subassociation. Its prominent footballers included Fadil Vokrri among others. In 2014, KF Llapi became a part of the Football Superleague of Kosovo.

There are two major football stadiums in Podujevë. Zahir Pajaziti Stadium, that hosts FC Llapi and holds 6,000 seats. The other is located in Merdare, and has a capacity of 5,000; it hosted the former club KF Hysi. Other smaller football clubs also exist.

== Transport ==
Through the municipality of Podujevë passes the nationally important road which connects Kosovo and Serbia, part of the road axis Pristina - Podujevë - Merdarë and then in Serbia, which is considered a national road. The national road Pristina-Merdarë (M25) passes through the central and south-eastern part of the municipality. It is characterized by quite dense traffic, both in the transport of goods and passengers.

The railway network in Podujevë links Kosovo to Serbia. It is 22 km (14 mi) long and 10 settlements are linked directly to this railroad. 45.08% of Podujevë's citizens also have direct access to it. As of 2010, however, the railway is inoperative.

Public transport in Podujevë is organized through buses, small buses and other vehicles since there are many villages. Some villages located deep in the municipality do not have access to public transportation, owing to their remoteness and small population. In June 2024, a new bus station opened, replacing the older, informal one, though as of September the same year it had still not started operation.

== Twin towns – sister cities ==
Podujevë is twinned with:

- Velbert, Germany
- Linz, Austria
- Kestel, Turkey
- Grubišno Polje, Croatia

== Notable people ==
- Adem Demaçi (1936–2018), Albanian writer and former politician
- Agon Mehmeti (b. 1989), Albanian footballer
- Arlind Ajeti (b. 1993), Albanian footballer
- Dafina Zeqiri (b. 1989), Albanian singer and songwriter
- Debatik Curri (b. 1984), Albanian footballer
- Dragan Maksimović (1949–2001), Serbian actor
- Fadil Vokrri (1960–2018), footballer
- Fatmir Sejdiu (b. 1951), former President of Kosovo
- Granit Xhaka (b. 1992), Swiss footballer
- Jashar Erebara (b. 1873), rilindas, journalist
- Rrustem Mustafa, KLA commander
- Taulant Xhaka (b. 1991), Albanian footballer
- Vlora Çitaku (b. 1980), Albanian politician and diplomat
- Xhavit Bajrami (b. 1975), Albanian kick boxer
- Zahir Pajaziti (1962–1997), founding member of the Kosovo Liberation Army (KLA)

== See also ==
- List of villages in Podujevë

== Bibliography ==
- Pushkolli, Fehmi (1998). Llapi gjatë historisë. Interpress R. Company.
- Komuna e Podujevës (2010): "Plani Zhvillimor Komunal". Gis Consulting, Podujevo.
- Agjencia e Statistikave të Kosovës (2011): "Kosovo Census Atlas", Pristina. ISBN 978-9951-22-019-4.
- Komuna e Podujevës (2011): "Plani Investiv në Infrastrukturën e Ujësjellësit dhe Kanalizimit në Komunën e Podujevës". Podujevo.
