= Met Podujeva Mosque =

Mosque in Podujevë, Pristina, Kosovo

- Xhamia Met Podujeva
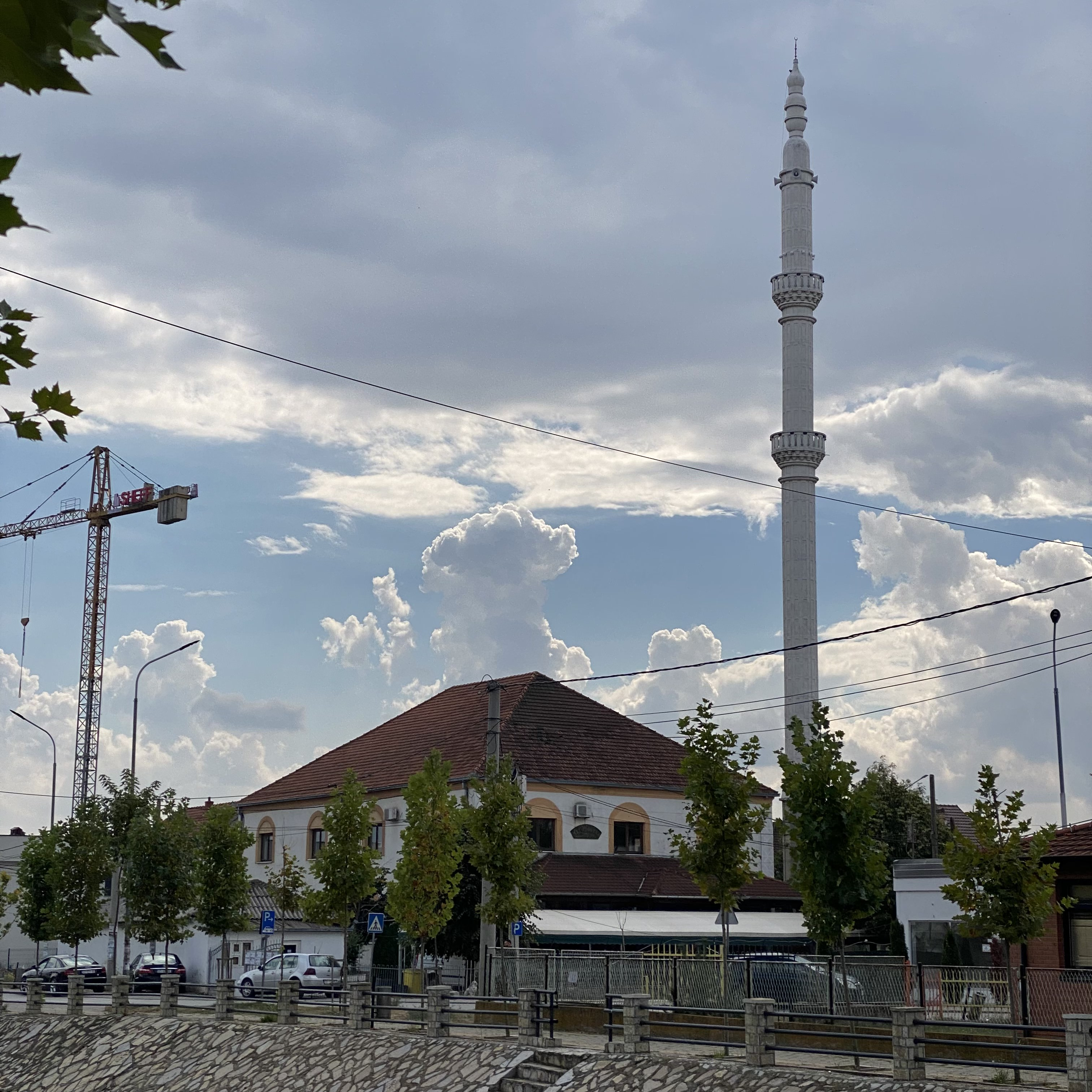

- Location within Kosovo

Religion
- Affiliation: Islam

Location
- Location: In the city center of Podujevë
- Country: Kosovo
- Interactive map of Met Podujeva Mosque
- Coordinates: 42°54′31.94″N 21°11′23.05″E

Architecture
- Type: Mosque

Met Podujeva Mosque is a mosque situated in northeastern Kosovo. The mosque is located in the center of the city of Podujevë and it's near the banks of the Llapi River.
