= Obrançë =

Obrançë: Obrançë (Albanian); Обранџа/Obrandža (Serbian)
- Village
- Location within Kosovo
- Coordinates: 42°54′50″N 21°10′14″E
- Location: Kosovo
- District: Prishtinë
- Municipality: Podujevë
- Elevation: 616 m (2,021 ft)

Population (2024)
  - Total: 3,010
- Time zone: UTC+1 (CET)
  - Summer (DST): UTC+2 (CEST)

Obrançë (Albanian: Obrançë, Serbian Cyrillic: Обранџа/Obrandža) is a village in Podujevë municipality.
