= Llapashticë e Epërme =

Llapashticë e Epërme: Llapashticë e Epërme (Albanian); Горња Лапаштица/Gornja Lapaštica (Serbian)
- Village
- Location within Kosovo
- Coordinates: 42.896734°N 21.139460°E
- Location: Kosovo
- District: Prishtinë
- Municipality: Podujevë
- Elevation: 623 m (2,044 ft)

Population (2024)
  - Total: 1,736
- Time zone: UTC+1 (CET)
  - Summer (DST): UTC+2 (CEST)

Llapashticë e Epërme (Albanian: Llapashticë e Epërme, Serbian Cyrillic: Горња Лапаштица/Gornja Lapaštica) is a village in Podujevë municipality.
