= Batllavë =

Village in Kosovo

Batllavë: Batllavë (Albanian); Батлава/Batlava (Serbian)
- Village
- Interactive map of Batllavë
- Location within Kosovo
- Coordinates: 42.835767°N 21.246876°E
- Country: Kosovo
- District: Prishtinë
- Municipality: Podujevë
- Elevation: 594 m (1,949 ft)

Population (2024)
  - Total: 2,056
- Time zone: UTC+1 (CET)
  - Summer (DST): UTC+2 (CEST)

Batllavë (Albanian: Batllavë, Serbian Cyrillic: Батлава/Batlava) is a village in Podujevë municipality.

== See also ==
- List of villages in Podujevo
