= Murgull =

Village in Podujevo, Kosovo

- Village
- Location within Kosovo
- Country: Kosovo
- District: Prishtinë
- Municipality: Podujevë

Population (2024)
  - Total: 18
- Time zone: UTC+1 (CET)
  - Summer (DST): UTC+2 (CEST)

Murgull is a village in the municipality of Podujevë, Kosovo.

== Etymology ==
The name Murgull of the village comes from the Albanian word mug/muzg, meaning "dim light" or "dusk", and is expanded with the Albanian suffix -ull (derived from the Balkan Latin -ul).

== Geography ==
Murgull is situated in the upper Llapi region of the municipality of Podujevë, in northeastern Kosovo. It lies in the mountainous upper part of the Llapi basin, within the Gryka e Llapit. The settlement is situated at the confluence of the Bellasica and Ržana rivers. Local watercourses recorded in the area include the Murgull River and Milisavljev Stream, while springs include those of Maapa, Hladna Voda and the Ržana meadows. The surrounding area contains fields, meadows and forested slopes, including the localities known as Duga Njiva, Prisoje and Goreljak. "Poreklo stanovništva sela Murgula (Podujevo)". Poreklo.

The Murgull River continues downstream through the upper Llapi valley and forms part of the headwater system of the Llapi River. It joins another headwater stream in the area of Pollatë, after which the combined river is generally identified as the Llapi. The Llapi subsequently flows through the Llapi basin and joins the Sitnica. "Pozita gjeografike". Municipality of Podujevë.

Bellasica, historically a distinct settlement, is today regarded locally as a hamlet of Murgull. The wider area is characterized by steep, forested and mountainous terrain and forms the northernmost part of the upper Llapi region.

== History ==
Murgull has evidence of habitation from several historical periods. At the confluence of the Ržana and Bellasica rivers, near the road toward Bela Stena, an old cemetery is recorded. Another largely dispersed cemetery was recorded at Duga Njiva and beside the Bellasica River. These remains indicate that the present settlement landscape contains traces of earlier populations and settlements. "Poreklo stanovništva sela Murgula (Podujevo)". Poreklo.

According to the ethnographic research of Radoslav Pavlović, based on fieldwork conducted between 1934 and 1953, Murgull had 21 households at the time of the survey. The recorded Albanian families included Selova, who had arrived after the wars of 1877–1878 from Selova in Upper Toplica and were identified as muhajirs from Gaganjevo, and Shatra, identified as muhajirs from Shatra near Kuršumlijska Banja. One household of each family was recorded as having emigrated to Turkey after the Balkan Wars of 1912–1913. "Poreklo stanovništva sela Murgula (Podujevo)". Poreklo.

The nearby settlement of Bellasica has a separate and much older history. It was historically a mining settlement in the upper Llapi region and was known in Ottoman administrative sources as a centre associated with the Llapi area. The Municipality of Podujevë states that during the Ottoman period the historical Llapi region included the Nahija of Kosovo, whose centre was at Kosovo, also known as Bellasica. "Istorijat". Municipality of Podujevë.

Over time, Bellasica became heavily depopulated and was incorporated into the settlement area of Murgull in local usage. It is consequently regarded today as a hamlet of Murgull, although historical sources treat Bellasica as a distinct settlement.

== Bellasica ==
Bellasica (Albanian: ‘‘Bellasica’’, Serbian: »’’Belasica’’) is a hamlet of Murgull. Although it is regarded locally today as part of Murgull, Bellasica appears to have historically existed as a distinct settlement. Its population declined considerably over time, and the settlement subsequently became incorporated into the wider village area of Murgull.

Bellasica has a history associated with mining. According to research based on the Ottoman register of 1566, Bellasica was a small mining settlement with approximately 150 households, of which 127 were Christian and 23 Muslim. It was described as the smallest of the mining towns recorded in Kosovo in that period. During the Ottoman period, the Llap nahija had its seat in Bellasica. Mining activity subsequently declined, and the settlement lost much of its former importance.

Remains of the former settlement have survived in the surrounding area, including ruins locally associated with a structure known as the ‘‘Kulla’’. Bellasica formed part of the wider mining landscape of the upper Llapi region, which included several historically important mining settlements.

The wider Murgull area was also affected by population movements during the late Ottoman period. Following the Serbian–Ottoman War of 1877–1878, Albanian muhajirs from the Toplica region settled throughout the Llapi area, including settlements around Murgull. Subsequent depopulation and migration contributed to the disappearance or incorporation of some smaller settlements into neighbouring villages.

== See also ==
- Podujevë
