= Gllamnik =

Village in Podujevo, Kosovo

Gllamnik: Gllamnik (Albanian); Главник/Glavnik (Serbian)
- Village
- Interactive map of Gllamnik
- Coordinates: 42.870656°N 21.182803°E
- Location: Kosovo
- District: Prishtinë
- Municipality: Podujevë
- Elevation: 597 m (1,959 ft)

Population (2024)
  - Total: 3,162
- Time zone: UTC+1 (CET)
  - Summer (DST): UTC+2 (CEST)

Gllamnik (Albanian definite form: Gllamniku) or Glavnik (Serbian Cyrillic: Главник), is a village in Podujevë municipality.

Gllamnik is primarily inhabited by Albanians, predominantly members of the Krasniqi tribe. The village is divided into several neighborhoods, including Derllupi, Qypolli, and Gjinolli. These families are believed to have settled in the area centuries ago, likely migrating from the Highlands of Gjakova during the period of the Ottoman Empire.

The largest neighborhood in Gllamnik, considered an inner village, is Sekiraqa. This community settled in the area as muhaxhir from the Toplica region following the events of 1877–78.

== Sources ==
- F. Teichner, A. Drăgan, R. Dürr, Vindenis (Glavnik/Gllamnik, Kosovo) – Roman Military Presence in the Heart of the Dardanian Mining District. In : C. S. Sommer / S. Matešic (éds.): Limes XXIII. Proceedings of the 23rd International Congress of Roman Frontier Studies, Ingolstadt 2015. Mainz 2018, 426-436.
