= List of villages in Podujevë =

Villages in Podujevo

This is a list of the villages in the Municipality of Podujevo, Kosovo.

== Villages ==
- Bajçinë
- Balloc
- Barainë
- Batllavë
- Bellopojë
- Bërvenik
- Bllatë
- Bradash
- Brainë
- Brecë
- Buricë
- Dobërdol
- Dobratin
- Dumnicë e Epërme
- Dumnicë e Poshtme
- Dumosh
- Dvorishtë
- Dyz
- Gërdoc
- Gllamnik
- Godishnjak
- Halabak
- Hërticë
- Kaçybeg
- Kalaticë
- Katunishtë
- Kërpimeh
- Kunushec
- Kushevicë
- Letancë
- Livadicë
- Lupçi i Epërm
- Lupçi i Poshtëm
- Lladoc
- Llapashticë e Epërme
- Llapashticë e Poshtme
- Llaushë
- Llugë
- Lluzhan
- Majac
- Merdari
- Metehi
- Metergoc
- Miroc
- Muhazob
- Murgull
- Obrançë
- Orllan
- Pakashticë e Epërme
- Pakashticë e Poshtme
- Penuhë
- Peran
- Përpellac
- Pollatë
- Popovë
- Potok
- Rakinicë
- Reçicë
- Repë
- Revuq
- Sallabajë
- Sfeçël
- Siboc i Epërm
- Siboc i Poshtëm
- Sllatinë
- Surdull
- Surkish
- Sylevicë
- Shajkoc
- Shakovicë
- Shtedim
- Tërnavë
- Tërnavicë
- Turuçicë
- Zakut
- Zhiti
