= 1997 in politics =

This is a list of events relating to politics in 1997.

== Events ==
=== January ===
- January 1 - Establishment of Operation Northern Watch by a US-led coalition to enforce a no-fly zone over northern Iraq
- January 11 - Turkey threatens Cyprus followings its purchase of Russian S-300 missiles, prompting the Cypriot Missile Crisis
- January 19 - Israeli Prime Minister Benjamin Netanyahu and Palestine Liberation Organisation Chairman Yasser Arafat sign the Hebron Agreement, initiating partial Israeli withdrawal from the region
- January 23 - Madeleine Albright becomes the first female American Secretary of State, after her confirmation by the United States Senate
- January 31 - Assassination of Kosovo Liberation Army (KLA) founder Zahir Pajaziti and his fellow commanders Hakif Zejnullahu and Edmond Hoxha by Serbian security forces

=== February ===
- February 10 - Australian newspapers expose the Sandline affair, in which the government of Papua New Guinea sought the help of mercenaries during the Bougainville Conflict
- February 13 - Having previously contested the results, Serbian President Slobodan Milošević recognizes the opposition victories of the November 1996 elections
- February 19 - Death of Deng Xiaoping, former paramount leader of China
- February 28 - Turkish military memorandum forces the resignation of Islamist prime minister Necmettin Erbakan and the end of his coalition government in a "post-modern coup"

=== March ===
- March 4 - US President Bill Clinton bans the federal funding of research into human cloning
- March 11 - Capture of Yei by Sudanese rebels during Operation Thunderbolt
- March 26 - Julius Chan resigns as prime minister of Papua New Guinea, effectively ending the Sandline affair

=== April ===
- April 2 - Étienne Tshisekedi becomes Prime Minister of Zaire after the rebel seizure of Kasenga during the First Congo War
- April 3 - Thalit massacre in Algeria: all but 1 of the 53 inhabitants of Thalit are killed by guerrillas
- April 17 - Death of former Israeli President Chaim Herzog
- April 22 - Resolution of the 126-day hostage crisis at the residence of the Japanese ambassador in Lima, Peru
- April 29 - The Chemical Weapons Convention Treaty is entered into force

=== May ===
- May 2 - Tony Blair becomes Prime Minister of the United Kingdom, having won the 1997 United Kingdom general election
- May 12 - The Russia-Chechnya Peace Treaty is signed by Russian President Boris Yeltsin and the president of Chechnya Aslan Maskhadov
- May 15 - The United States government acknowledges the existence of the "Secret War" in Laos (1953–1975) during the Vietnam War
- May 16 - First Congo War ends as president Mobutu Sese Seko is exiled from Zaire
- May 16 - US president Bill Clinton issues a formal apology to the surviving victims of the Tuskegee Study of Untreated Syphilis in the Negro Male and their families
- May 17 - Laurent-Désiré Kabila renames Zaire the Democratic Republic of the Congo and proclaims himself president
- May 20 - The US imposes economic sanctions on Myanmar in response to "large-scale repression of the country's democratic opposition"
- May 23 - Mohammad Khatami wins the 1997 Iranian presidential election and becomes the first Iranian Reformist president
- May 25 - A military coup in Sierra Leone replaces President Ahmad Tejan Kabbah with Major Johnny Paul Koroma

=== June ===
- June 1 - A Socialist Party-led Centre-left coalition win the second-round in the 1997 French legislative elections
- June 1 - Hugo Banzer wins the Presidential elections in Bolivia
- June 5 - Anticipating a coup attempt, President Pascal Lissouba of the Republic of the Congo orders the detention of his rival Denis Sassou Nguesso, initiating the Second Republic of the Congo civil war
- June 10 - – Khmer Rouge leader Pol Pot orders the killing of his defense chief, Son Sen, and 11 of Sen's family members, before fleeing to his northern stronghold
- June 11 - In the United Kingdom, the House of Commons votes for a total ban on handguns
- June 26 - Bertie Ahern is appointed as the 10th Taoiseach of the Republic of Ireland and Mary Harney is appointed as the 16th, and first female, Tánaiste, after their parties, Fianna Fáil and the Progressive Democrats respectively, win the 1997 General Election
- June 27 - Tajikistan president Emomali Rahmon and United Tajik Oppositionleader Sayid Abdulloh Nuri signed the General Agreement on the Establishment of Peace and National Accord in Tajikistan and the Moscow Protocol in Moscow, Russia, ending the Tajikistani Civil War

=== July ===
- July 1 - The United Kingdom hands sovereignty of Hong Kong to the People's Republic of China
- July 2 - The Bank of Thailand floats the baht, triggering the Asian financial crisis
- July 5 - Hun Sen of the Cambodian People's Party overthrows Norodom Ranariddh in a coup
- July 5 - The Egyptian Islamic Group announces a cessation-of-violence initiative
- July 8 - NATO invites the Czech Republic, Hungary, and Poland to join the alliance in 1999
- July 25 - KR Narayanan is sworn in as India's 10th president and the first member of the Dalit caste to hold this office

=== August ===
- August 3–11 - Two of the three islands of the Union of the Comoros – Anjouan and Mohéli – attempt to revert to colonial rule by France. The plan fails when the French government of President Jacques Chirac refuses to recolonize them, resulting in the two islands being reintegrated into the Comoros over the next two years
- August 26 - The Independent International Commission on Decommissioning is set up in Northern Ireland, as part of the peace process
- August 28 - The UN Security Council unanimously adopts resolution 1127, demanding that UNITA and the Government of Angola immediately complete the peace process to end the civil war
- August 31 - Death of Diana, Princess of Wales

=== September ===
- September 1 - Dublin Regulation on treatment of applications for right of asylum under European Union law first comes into force
- September 11 - Scotland votes in favour of a devolved Parliament, forming the Scottish Parliament less than two years later
- September 18 - Wales votes in favour of devolution and the formation of a National Assembly for Wales
- September 21 - The Islamic Salvation Army, the Islamic Salvation Fronts' armed wing, declares a unilateral ceasefire in Algeria

=== October ===
- October 3 - The president of Paraguay, Juan Carlos Wasmosy, orders the arrest of political opponent Lino Oviedo after a 1996 coup attempt
- October 15 - Colombo World Trade Centre bombing is harried out by the LTTE in Sri Lanka
- October 29 - Iraq disarmament crisis: Iraq says it will begin shooting down Lockheed U-2 surveillance planes being used by UNSCOM inspectors

=== November ===
- November 17 - In Luxor, Egypt, 62 people are killed by 6 Islamic militants outside the Temple of Hatshepsut

=== December ===
- December 1 - In the Indian state of Bihar, Ranvir Sena attacks the CPI(ML) Party Unity stronghold Lakshmanpur-Bathe, killing 58 lower caste people
- December 3 - In Ottawa, Ontario, Canada, representatives from 121 countries sign a treaty prohibiting the manufacture and deployment of anti-personnel land mines
- December 11 - The Kyoto Protocol is adopted by a United Nations committee
- December 22 - Acteal massacre: In Mexico, 45 people attending a prayer meeting of Catholic Indigenous townspeople are killed by the right-wing paramilitary group Máscara Roja, with the support of the Mexican Government
- December 27 - Ulster loyalist paramilitary leader Billy Wright is assassinated in Northern Ireland, inside Long Kesh prison
- December 30 - Wilaya of Relizane massacres: In one of the worst incidents of Algeria's insurgency, almost 400 people from four villages in the Wilaya of Relizane are killed
