= Pollatë =

Pollatë Pollatë or Pollata (Albanian)
- Village
- Location within Kosovo
- Coordinates: 43°2′57.38″N 21°7′15.7″E
- Country: Kosovo
- District: Prishtinë
- Municipality: Podujevo

Area
  - Total: 6.9 km^{2} (2.7 sq mi)
- Elevation: 777 m (2,549 ft)

Population (2024)
  - Total: 82
  - Density: 12/km^{2} (31/sq mi)
- Time zone: UTC+1 (CET)
  - Summer (DST): UTC+2 (CEST)

Pollatë is a village in the Municipality of Podujeva, Kosovo. In 2011, it had 239 inhabitants.

== Geography ==
The village of Pollatë is located in the north of this municipality. It is considered the source of the Llapi river. In the north of Pollatë, are the villages of Brecë and Dvorishtë and in the south is the village of Repë.
