= Mendi Mengjiqi =

Kosovo-Albanian composer (born c. 1958

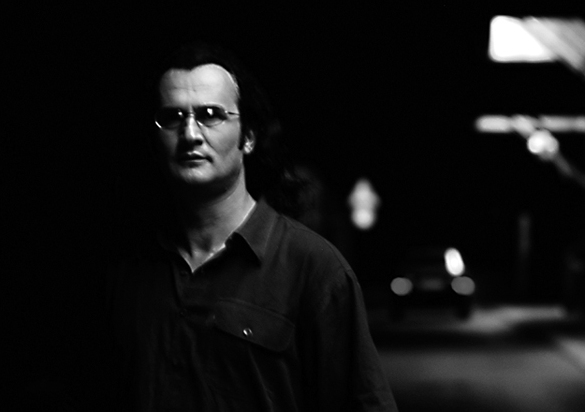
- Mengjiqi in 2005
- Born: 1958 (age 67–68); Lupçi i Epërm, District of Pristina
- Occupation: composer

Mendi Mengjiqi (born c.1958) is a Kosovar composer and the author of the Kosovar national anthem.

== Early life and education ==
An ethnic Kosovo Albanian, he was born in Lupçi i Epërm, District of Pristina.

From 1976 to 1980 he studied at the 2nd degree music school in Pristina ( double bass and music theory class ), and then he studied at the Academy of Music in Pristina (Faculty of Music Theory), graduating in 1987. In 1988–1990 he continued his music studies in Maribor, but he had to interrupt them and in 1991 he came to Poland.

== Career ==
Mengjiqi graduated from the Academy of Music in Kraków, in the class of Zbigniew Bujarski. He completed post-graduate studies in 1996–1999 under the supervision of Krzysztof Penderecki.

He carried out an intensive ten-year activity in this very country, where he had considerable success. His works are executed in different parts of the world. His works Tillagynad Gunnel o Tage Svensson and Pashko Berisha for string orchestra, Donum Musicum for symphony orchestra, Sonata Interrotta for wind trio are distinguished. Other works include Dance for 5 percussionists and piano, Shota for 6 percussions, a large-scale oratorium Homagium Matri Teresiae (Homage to Mother Teresa).

After returning from Poland, he became a teacher at the Faculty of Arts of the University of Pristina, where he teaches composition. He is the author of dozens of compositions of entertaining songs. He composed the music for the feature films Anatema and Agnus Dei by director Agim Sopi and Donkeys of the Border by director Jeton Ahmetaj.

Mendi Mengjiqi lives in his hometown of Lupç i Epërm.
