= Repe =

Repe may refer to:

== People ==
- Jurij Repe (born 1994), Slovenian ice hockey player
- Repe or Reino Helismaa (1913–1965), Finnish singer-songwriter, musician and scriptwriter

== Places ==
- Repe (river), North Rhine-Westphalia, Germany
- Repe, Germany
- Repë, Kosovo
