= Surkish =

Village in Podujevo, Kosovo

Surkish Суркиш
- Village
- Location within Kosovo
- Coordinates: 42°54′N 21°12′E
- Country: Kosovo
- District: Prishtinë
- Municipality: Podujevë

Population (2024)
  - Total: 1,178
- Time zone: UTC+1 (CET)
  - Summer (DST): UTC+2 (CEST)

Historical populations
Year	Pop.	±%
1948	304	—
1953	352	+15.8%
1961	385	+9.4%
1971	445	+15.6%
1981	657	+47.6%
1991	757	+15.2%
2011	1,091	+44.1%
2024	1,178	+8.0%

Surkish (Serbian: Суркиш) is a village in the municipality of Podujevo, Kosovo.

== Surkish ambush ==
On 25 October 1996, Kosovo Liberation Army insurgents armed with automatic weapons ambushed 2 Yugoslav police officers in Surkish, near Podujevo. The ambush resulted in the instant death of 2 officers, Miloš Nikolić (34), a police inspector of the Pristina Precinct and Dragan Rakić from Velika Reka, a reserve police officer and a manager of a company in Podujevo. Nikolić was killed in front of his house.

According to Avni Ajeti, one of the KLA soldiers that took part in the ambush, the operation was commanded by Zahir Pajaziti and Ilir Konushevci. The KLA had been tracking Nikolić who was known for being anti-Albanian, following him through his daily activities before killing him in front of his house.

== See also ==
- Podujevo
