= Balloc =

Balloc: Balloc (Albanian); Баловац/Balovac (Serbian)
- Village
- Interactive map of Balloc
- Coordinates: 42°53′43″N 21°14′12″E
- Country: Kosovo
- District: Prishtinë
- Municipality: Podujevë
- Elevation: 660 m (2,170 ft)

Population (2024)
  - Total: 1,724
- Time zone: UTC+1 (CET)
  - Summer (DST): UTC+2 (CEST)

Balloc (Albanian: Balloc, Serbian Cyrillic: Баловац/Balovac) is a village in Podujevë municipality.

== See also ==
- List of villages in Podujevo
