= Bajçinë =

Bajçinë: Bajçinë (Albanian); Бајчина/Bajčina (Serbian)
- Village
- Interactive map of Bajçinë
- Coordinates: 42.950905°N 21.156924°E
- Country: Kosovo
- District: Prishtinë
- Municipality: Podujevë
- Elevation: 624 m (2,047 ft)

Population (2024)
  - Total: 1,695
- Time zone: UTC+1 (CET)
  - Summer (DST): UTC+2 (CEST)

Bajçinë (Albanian: Bajçinë, Serbian Cyrillic: Бајчина, Bajčina) is a village in Podujevë municipality.

Bajçina is primarily inhabited by Albanians, predominantly from the Gashi tribe. The village is divided into several neighborhoods, with some of the oldest being Çitaku, Gashi, Muçolli, and Gjata. It is said that the Çitaku family were the first settlers in the village, followed by the Gashi and Muçolli families. A notable landmark in the village is an ancient poplar tree (plep in Albanian), believed to be over 350 years old, which is said to have been planted by the Çitaku family.

Additionally, Bajçina is home to Muhaxhir families who migrated from the Toplica region during the expulsions of 1877–78. These families established neighborhoods such as Lepaja, Parduzi, Ismajli, and Shala, among others.

== See also ==
- List of villages in Podujevo
