= Abdullah Gërguri =

Albanian painter

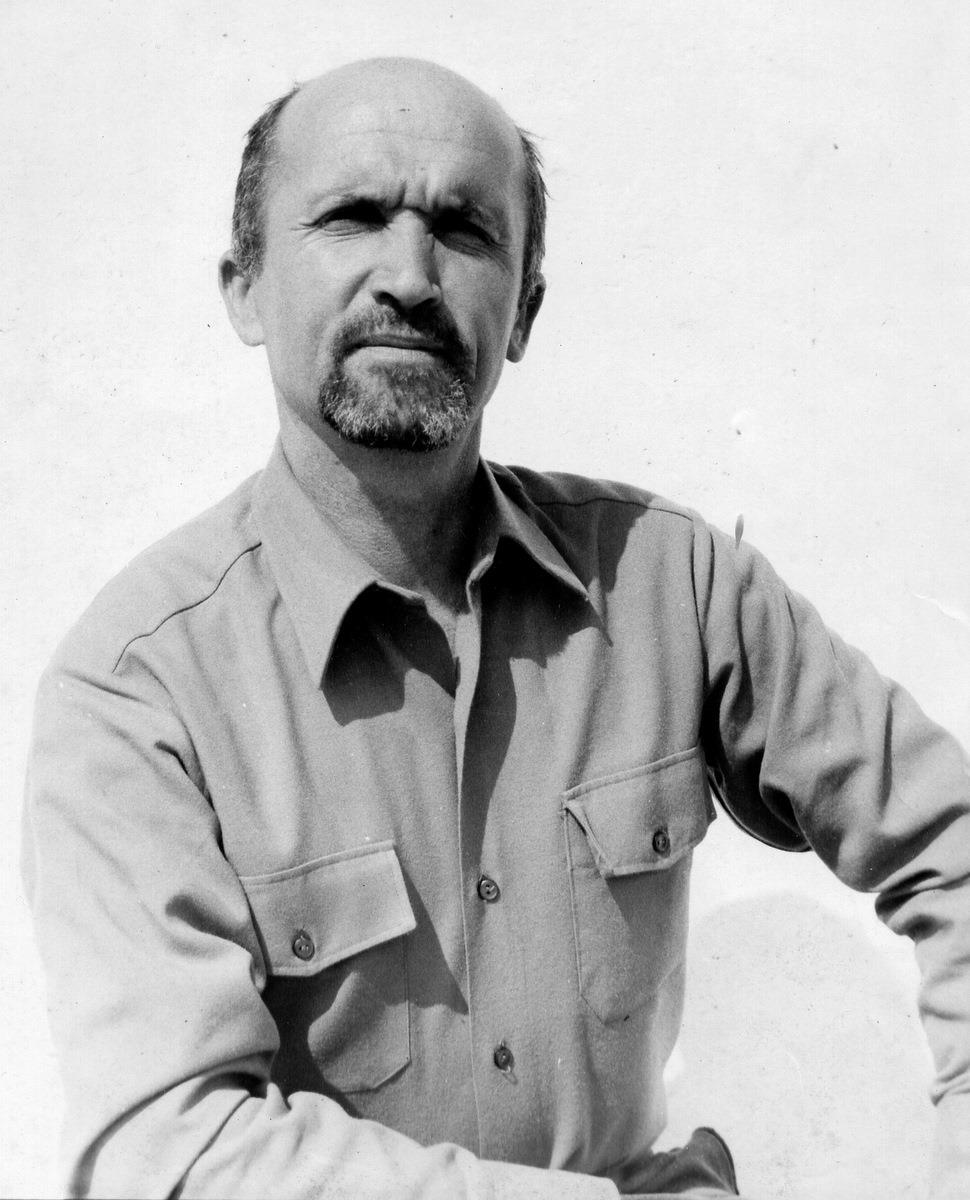
Abdullah Gërguri, renowned Kosovo Albanian artist in the restoration and conservation of icons and frescoes.

Abdullah Gërguri (1931–1994) was a Kosovo Albanian artist in restoration and conservation of the icons and frescoes.

== Early Work & Training ==
Gërguri was born in the village Siboc near Podujevë, in southern Kingdom of Yugoslavia, present-day Kosovo.

The painter-conservator Gërguri, while he was working at the Institute for Protection of Cultural Monuments in Pristina, was engaged heavily in conservation of frescos, icons and monuments, and also in their restoration.

He finished the High School of Arts in Pejë (Alb. SHLP) in 1954. He was a member of the first student cohort at this school.

After he finished this school, he was engaged as an art teacher in Podujeva's high school. After he finished his course at the SHLP, the fine art group, he was engaged in Shkolla Normale in Pristina during 1958–1961. After this time he started to work at the Institute for Protection of Cultural Monuments in Pristina, where he worked until he died.

He firstly was engaged in Sinan Pasha Mosque (Prizren), which has a tall minaret with a large dome (diameter 14 m (46 ft), internal height 20 m (66 ft)), where the mural paintings give magnificent and specific sight in this monumental and cultural building. The most important murals are in the middle of the dome, as is the main rosette. All mural paintings in Sinan Pasha Mosque are characterized with virtuous, spiritual drawings and a wealth of rare colours. The collection of the paintings within this mosque are considered among most beautiful examples of mural paintings of Islamic art in Kosovo. This mosque was built in 1615. Its architect was Sofi-Sinan Pasha, born in village Vajle, Lumë-Albania.

== Conservation/Restoration Work ==
In accordance with the decision of the Institution for Urbanism and Protection of the Monuments of the Culture in Prizren, on 21 September 1972, Abdullah Gërguri started work on the conservation and restoration of mural paintings in the mosque. At that time, the mosque had significant damage which he later repaired. Two types of repairs were necessary: revealing old paintings and conservation of two layers of the paintings. The conservation of the paintings on the dome was done later. The surfaces of the dome were repaired during four seasons: in years 1972-1974 and 1975.

Gërguri has also worked in the Hadum Mosque in Gjakovë and the Great Mosque (1969) in Pristina.

He later worked on restoration of the arabesques and decorative mural paintings of the other historical monuments. Gërguri has worked on the Patriarchal Monastery of Peć – Saint Apostles in Graçanicë, in Saint Prentia also. While he was working at the Institute for Protection of Cultural Monuments in Pristina, on conservation of frescoes, icons, and other monuments, he also worked in Saint John's Church in Hoca, Saint Peter of Korishë in Kabash and Saint Nicola's Church on Sicevë which were built in the 14th century.

Gërguri worked also out of Kosovo. He worked in Macedonia (Ohër-Ohrid), in different churches on fresco restoration. He was largely engaged also in many churches in Bosnia. He was given awards many times.

== Awards ==
During the 30th anniversary of the Protection of the Monuments of Culture, he was awarded the diploma and medallion. During the 10th anniversary of the creation of the Institute for the Protection of Cultural Monuments in Prizren, he was awarded with a certificate for outstanding work. He was on different specializations in Croatia, Slovenia, Bosnia, etc., and to gain more knowledge about the achievements on the conservation of the monuments, he visited Italy, Albania, Turkey and Greece.

He is known for his conservation and restoration of mural paintings. He was the only painter at that time in Kosovo working in this field.

== Reproduction of Frescoes/Icons ==
Painter Gërguri also used to copy Orthodox Christian frescoes and icons in his spare time while he was working in different churches in Kosovo. Among these are: 'Saint John', 'The Girl with the Pot' (Patriarchal Monastery of Peć), 'Portrait of the Apostle', 'Jesus of Prizren', 'A detail from the Secret Supper' (Saint Prenia, Prizren), 'Saint Mercury', 'Saint Mary on the Throne' (Hoçë e Madhe), 'Saint Nicolas' (Kabash), 'Detail form the icon' (Dečani) etc.
