= Turuçicë =

Village in Podujevo, Kosovo

- Village
- Location within Kosovo
- Country: Kosovo
- District: Prishtinë
- Municipality: Podujevë

Population (2024)
  - Total: 24
- Time zone: UTC+1 (CET)
  - Summer (DST): UTC+2 (CEST)

Turuçicë is a village in the municipality of Podujevë, Kosovo.

Turiqica belongs to the Gallap (Gollak) region.

Turuçicë is famous being the birth place of Zahir Pajaziti. He was one of the founders and a commander of the Kosovo Liberation Army (KLA). He was the first Commander of the KLA, known as "First Gun of Freedom".

== See also ==
- Podujevë
- List of villages in Podujevë
