= Demographics of Pristina =

Demographics of Pristina Region (according to the Kosovo Agency of Statistics 2011)

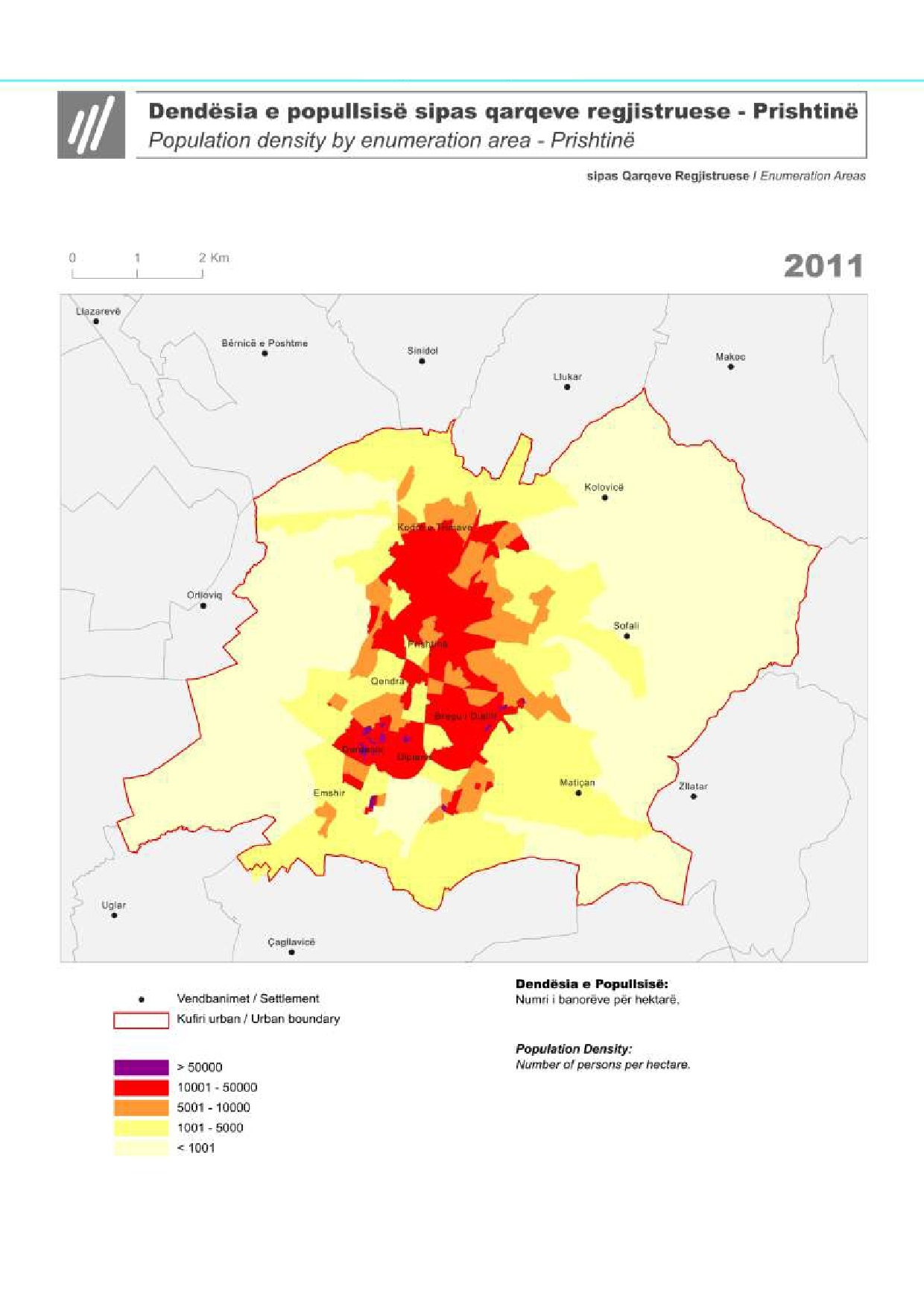

This map it shows population density by enumeration Area Prishtine 2011
Pristina
Areas
Population
2012 census
Area

Density

City of Pristina
(Kosovo Agency of Statistics)
205,133
854 km^{2} (330 sq mi)
230/km^{2} (600/sq mi)|
Urban
(KAS)
161,751
Not available
247/km^{2} (640/sq mi)

Rural
(KAS)
37,460
Not available
123/km^{2} (320/sq mi)

As of December 2012 Pristina, the capital city of Kosovo, had a population of 205,133 registered inhabitants.

The Rural Part of the municipality as well as the area near the center of Pristina, in terms of socio-economic processes is under the influence of population dynamics, both in terms of demographic regime, which is more expansive, and in addition mechanical population. This part of the municipality has a high density of population. According to some new data, the density of population in the municipality of Pristina is 247 inhabitants per km^{2} While the population density of suburban area of the municipality without Pristina, as an urban center, is 123 inhabitants per km^{2} Pristina as an urban center with representative functions and its economic strength, has changed the population structure. Pristina with the surrounding space has become increasingly a concentration to a large population. While the mountain area, especially more distant areas have a displacement due to depopulation, especially after the recent war. The network of settlements on the territory of the Municipality of Pristina has some specifics. Such as distribution of settlements depends on the degree of economic development, natural conditions, socio-political circumstances, position. One of the features is also uneven distribution of the settlements.

== Historical ==
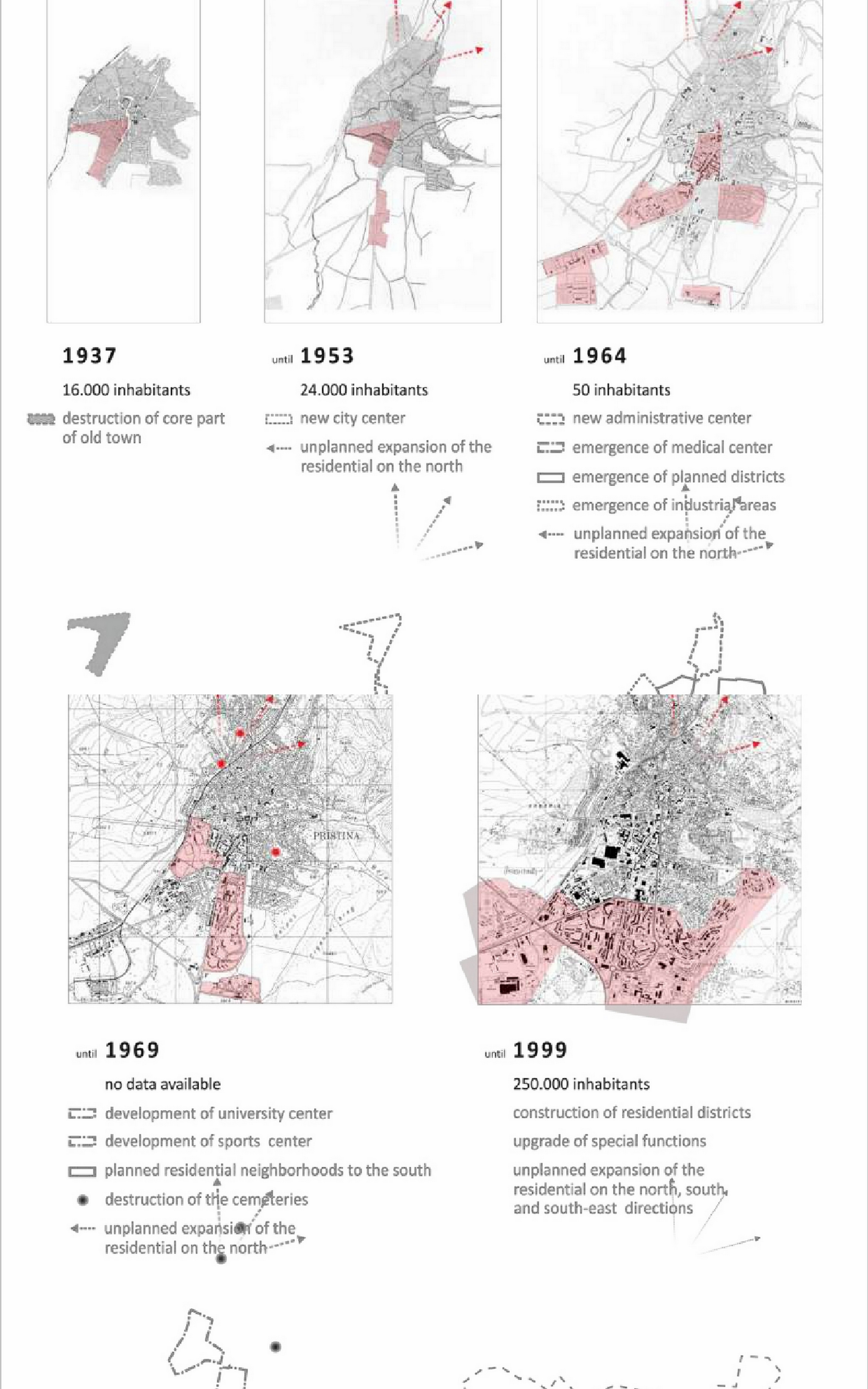
This map it shows the extent of the urban areas of Pristina during years till 1999 census..

The history of the city was written by the stories of visitors, traders and different invaders of the country, according to which Pristina was built and destroyed many times by different conflicts that took place throughout the history. The oldest writings found place Pristina as a populated area in the middle of the 9th century. It lays 7 km (4 mi) north from the historical location of the Roman city Ulpiana which was destroyed in the coming years, fueling the development of Pristina as a new centrality. During the 14th century, the city became an important trade center due to the crossroad of some of the main arteries linking different parts of the region. In a very short time the city became an important meeting point of many different markets, especially Genoa, Verona, Mantua and Florence led by the colony created by the traders coming from Ragusa (today Dubrovnik).

Population statistics for Pristina start with the first census of 1874 when the region of Pristina had 1,567 houses, 258 villages and 19,260 inhabitants, 13,435 of whom were Muslims and 5,825 were Christians.

Based on the time of the Ottoman Empire, Pristina with the surroundings in 1878 had a total of 22,470 inhabitants of whom 16,462 Muslims, 4,686 Christian, 1,272 Gypsies and 50 Jews. In 1896/1897 Kaza of Pristina had 56,286 inhabitants whom 21,462 inhabitants were males and 19,099 were females, respectively 40,561 Muslims, 5,907 males and 5,279 females, respectively 11,186 Christians; 1,305 males, 890 females respectively 2,195 Muslim Gypsies, 446 male, 265 female respectively Christian Gypsies; 869 males, 764 females respectively 16,333 Latin Catholics - mostly Albanians.

At this time the Kaza of Pristina had 241 villages. Except Ottoman Empire for the statistics and the number of population in Sandžak of Pristina the Bulgarian author Mareninialso wrote about Pristina. According to him, the number of population in the Sandžak triple and so this sanjak had 118,500 Albanians, 32,500 Serbs and 2,200 Jews or Circassian and total 175,500 inhabitants.

Pristina according to Branislav Nušić consul, in 1902 Sandzak of Pristina had 220,000 inhabitants, of whom 2/3 were with Muslim religion. Others were Catholic and Serbs. Muslims and Catholics were all Albanians. Sandzak of Pristina consisted from 5 Kaza (Pristina, Gnjilane, Presevo, Vushtri, Mitrovica), with a total of 860 villages. Only Kaza of Pristina had 241 villages with 60.993 inhabitants, all of the Muslim religion.

Regarding the number of inhabitants, in 1905–1906 the territory of the municipality of Pristina belonged to Sandzak of Pristina and had 364.015 inhabitants, of whom 254.606 Albanian Muslims, 110.310 Albanian Catholics, Albanian Orthodoxs, Serbs, Romani also Bulgarians. While Pristina in the beginning of First Balkan War, according to the latest statistics from the Ottoman Empire had a total of 68.729 inhabitants of which 63.968 Albanians,3,093 Serbs, 547 Jews and 1,121 Romani.

=== District of Pristina ===
Qarku i Prishtinës Приштински округ Prištinski okrug District of Pristina
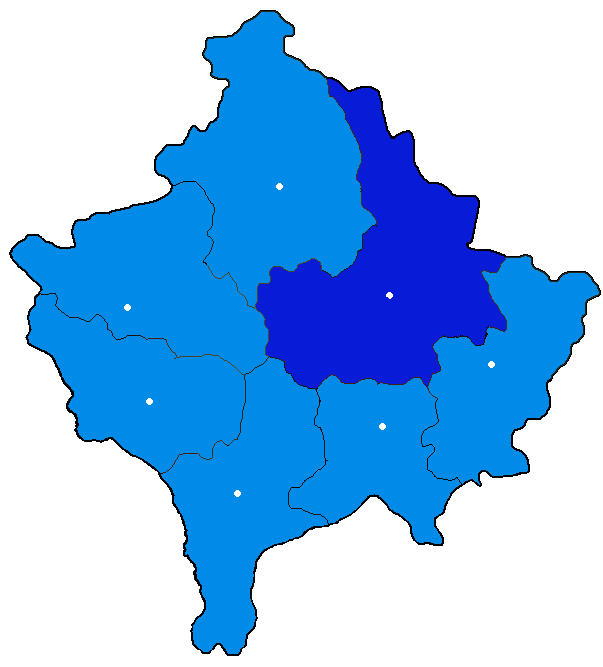
Pristina District within Kosovo.
Capital	Pristina

In autumn 1912, Kosovo was occupied by Serbian and Montenegro army. Began the wave of violence and terror, killings of Albanian population in this area. Many people of the territory of Pristina have been forced to flee their homeland and settle mainly in Turkey, while some in Albania, Syria. In order to rule more easily began administrative-territorial division of the Albanian and Kosovo territories. According to documents found in the archives of the Federal Secretariat of Foreign Affairs in Belgrade, PO Fund (Politçko Odelenje) from the consulate general there are some data for the deportation of Albanians from Kosovo in Thessaloniki in Turkey. According to the document 1246 drawn on April 12, 1914, in Turkey alone, 239,807 people were displaced. Note that 239,807 figure does not take children who were under age 6. Also noted in these documents, that have also passed through Kavala 4 thousand Muslim families. All these persons are said to have led Turkey with 395 European boats.

According to a 1913 British document titled "Repartion de la Population Generale des Villes non compromises dans l'etat ALBANIAS lors de la delimitation de 1913, et pourcentage des proportions" said that in the District of Pristina were 63.968 Albanian inhabitants, 8.093 Serbs, 547 Jewish, 1,121 Romani, total 73.737 inhabitants.

After the Balkan Wars and the First World War the number of population in the District of Pristina was reduced significantly. In this year the District of Pristina had 91,550 Albanian inhabitants, and 8,349 Serb inhabitants, this means that this region in 1918 had a total of 99,899 inhabitants.

1. According to the census of 1953 in the area of Gracanica where was a part of the territory of Pristina was this situation: 12 municipalities, 56 settlements with many neighborhoods in the context of the settlement, 6,734 families with 45,641 inhabitants. According to some data processed later in 94 settlements of Pristina were 13,389 households with 76,477 inhabitants.
2. According to the 1961 census, the municipality of Pristina had 94 settlements with 19,178 households with 102,516 inhabitants (57,417 or 56% Albanians, 34,731 or 33.9% Serbs, 4,140 or 4% Montenegrins, 3,584 or 3.5% Turks)
3. According to the 1971 census, the municipality of Pristina had 92 settlements with 28,003 households with 152,744 inhabitants (91,801 or 60.1% Albanians, 42,820 or 28% Serbs, 5,686 or 3.7% Montenegrins, 2,204 or 1.5% Turks)
4. According to the 1981 census, the municipality of Pristina had 92 settlements with 36,254 households with 210,044 inhabitants (140,043 or 66.7% Albanians, 43,875 or 20,9% Serbs, 6,394 or 3% Montenegrins, 21% or 4,034 Muslims, 1,974 or 1.5% Turks)
5. According to the 1991 Serbian census and estimates, Pristina Municipality had 295,093 inhabitants of which 161,314 or 78.7% Albanians, 27,293 or 13.3% Serbs, 3,888 or 1.9% Montenegrins, 202 or 1% Turks, or 6,626 3.2% Romani.

== Results of the 2011 census ==
=== Population by sex and ethnicity ===
Pristina	Total	Ethnicity (2011 Census)										
Pristina	Total	Albanian	Turks	Ashkali	Serbs	Bosniak	Gorani	Rom	Egyptian	Others	Prefer not to Answer	Not Available
Total	198,897	194,452	2,156	557	430	400	205	56	8	334	79	220
Male	99,361	97,347	1,060	281	204	107	99	31	3	110	37	82
Female	99,536	97,105	1,096	276	226	293	106	25	5	224	42	138

=== Population by sex and religion ===
Pristina	Total	Religion						
Pristina	Total	Islamic	Orthodox	Catholic	Other	No Religion	Prefer not to answer	Not Available
Total	198,897	193,474	480	1,170	344	660	2,388	381
Male	99,361	96,375	221	558	181	334	1,168	164
Female	99,536	96,739	259	612	163	326	1,220	217

=== Population by sex and citizenship ===
Pristina	Total	Country of citizenship										
Pristina	Total	Kosovo	Serbia	Albania	Macedonians	Montenegro	Turkey	Germany	United States	Bosnia and Herzegovina	Croatia	Other Country
Total	198,897	196,155	609	147	131	28	162	58	48	19	10	1,530
Male	99,361	98,019	308	57	62	13	94	25	28	3	3	749
Female	99,536	98,136	301	90	69	15	68	33	20	16	7	781

=== Population by type of sex and basic contingents ===
Pristina	Population			Infants 0 Age	Children 1-7 Age	Children 7-14 Age	Youth 15-27 Age	Working age population 15-64 Age			65+ Age
Pristina	Total	Male	Female	Infants 0 Age	Children 1-7 Age	Children 7-14 Age	Youth 15-27 Age	Total	Male	Female	65+ Age
Total	198,897	99,361	99,536	3,529	19,727	28,147	45,793	134,336	66,111	68,225	13,158
Urban	161,751	80,419	81,332	2,820	15,666	22,248	37,032	110,099	53,837	56,262	10,918
Rural	37,46	18,942	18,204	709	4,061	5,899	8,761	24,237	12,274	11,963	2,240

=== Population by sex and age-groups ===
Pristina	Total	Age-Group																
Pristina	Total	0-4	5-9	10-14	15-19	20-24	25-29	30-34	35-39	40-44	45-49	50-54	55-59	60-64	65-59	70-74	75-79	80+
Total	198,897	16,754	16,781	17,868	17,427	17,708	17,749	16,436	14,765	12,601	11,411	10,350	8,872	7,017	5,460	3,771	2,267	1,660
Male	99,361	8,636	8,747	9,414	9,014	8,899	8,678	7,905	7,153	6,075	5,573	5,001	4,325	3,488	2,764	1,901	1,063	725
Female	99,536	8,118	8,034	8,454	8,413	8,809	9,071	8,531	7,612	6,526	5,838	5,349	4,547	3,529	2,696	1,870	1,204	935

=== Population by sex and marital status ===
Pristina	Marital Status					
Pristina	Total	Never Married	Married with marriage Certificate	Married without marriage Certificate	Widowed	Divorced
Total	198,897	97,897	83,586	9,833	6,664	917
Male	99,361	51,776	41,372	47,227	1,216	270
Female	99,536	46,121	42,214	5,106	5,448	647

=== Population by age 10+ by highest completed education level and sex ===
Pristina	Total	Highest completed education level										
Pristina	Total	No completed education	4 classes	5 classes	8 classes	9 classes	12 classes	13 classes	High School	Faculty Bachelor	Post-graduate Degree	Doctorate/PHD
Total	165,362	12,416	6,775	14,466	23,382	14,792	47,197	15,485	4,747	21,671	3,612	819
Male	81,978	4,351	1,550	7,546	8,218	7,784	27,595	7,966	2,731	11,450	2,125	662
Female	83,384	8,065	5,225	6,920	15,164	7,008	19,602	7,519	2,016	10,221	1,487	157

=== Population by type of settlement, gender and ethnicity 2011 ===
Settlement, type of area	Total	Sex		Ethnicity										
Settlement, type of area	Total	Male	Female	Albanian	Serbian	Turkish	Bosnian	Romani	Ashkali	Egyptian	Gorani	Others	Prefer not to answer	Not available
Ballaban	167	86	81	167	-	-	-	-	-	-	-	-	-	-
Barilevë	2,212	1,088	1,124	2,210	1	-	-	-	-	-	-	1	-	-
Bërnicë e Epërme	1,595	802	793	1,580	11	-	-	-	-	-	-	2	-	2
Bërnicë e Poshtme	549	288	261	301	245	-	-	-	-	-	-	-	-	3
Besi	694	341	353	694	-	-	-	-	-	-	-	-	-	-
Busi	814	409	405	814	-	-	-	-	-	-	-	-	-	-
Çagllavicë	4,233	2,172	2,061	4,116	41	35	2	17	-	-	-	5	1	16
Dabishevc	108	51	57	107	1	-	-	-	-	-	-	-	-	-
Dragoc	178	87	91	176	-	-	1	-	-	-	-	1	-	-
Drenoc	590	295	295	590	-	-	-	-	-	-	-	-	-	-
Gllogovicë	74	40	34	74	-	-	-	-	-	-	-	-	-	-
Grashticë	433	212	221	432	-	-	-	-	-	-	-	-	-	-
Hajkobillë	72	38	34	72	-	-	-	-	-	-	-	-	-	-
Hajvali	7,391	3,786	3,605	7,339	6	25	3	-	-	-	-	16	-	2
Keçekollë	484	256	228	483	-	-	-	-	-	-	-	1	-	-
Koliq	466	254	212	464	-	-	-	-	-	-	-	2	-	-
Kolovicë	2,545	1,315	1,230	2,357	1	1	2	-	-	1	-	2	-	1
Kukavicë	17	8	9	17	-	-	-	-	-	-	-	-	-	-
Lebanë	398	199	199	397	1	-	-	-	-	-	-	-	-	-
Llukar	1,579	796	783	1,579	-	-	-	-	-	-	-	-	-	-
Makoc	997	521	476	997	-	-	-	-	-	-	-	-	-	-
Marec	432	243	189	432	-	-	-	-	-	-	-	-	-	-
Matiçan	13,876	6,990	6,886	13,782	3	42	21	-	-	-	1	13	1	13
Mramor	1,073	554	519	1,072	-	-	-	-	-	-	-	-	1	-
Nëntë Jugoviq	2,229	1,115	1,114	2,227	-	-	-	-	-	-	-	2	-	-
Nishec	55	29	26	55	-	-	-	-	-	-	-	-	-	-
Orlloviq	1,035	553	482	1,035	-	-	-	-	-	-	-	-	-	-
Prapashticë	240	133	107	240	-	-	-	-	-	-	-	-	-	-
Prishtinë	145,149	72,037	73,112	141,307	92	2,052	366	39	557	1	204	281	73	177
Prugoc	2,168	1,088	1,080	2,160	-	-	-	-	-	5	-	-	1	2
Radashecë	29	16	13	29	-	-	-	-	-	-	-	-	-	-
Rimanishtë	595	296	299	591	-	1	2	-	-	-	-	-	1	-
Sinidol	959	491	468	957	-	-	1	-	-	-	-	1	-	-
Siqevë	337	189	148	337	-	-	-	-	-	-	-	-	-	-
Slivovë	257	124	133	229	28	-	-	-	-	-	-	-	-	-
Sofali	1,767	901	866	1,758	-	-	-	-	-	-	-	6	1	2
Sharban	317	161	156	316	-	-	-	-	-	-	-	-	-	1
Shashkoc	298	161	137	298	-	-	-	-	-	-	-	-	-	-
Teneshdoll	359	176	183	359	-	-	-	-	-	-	-	-	-	-
Trudë	694	338	356	693	-	-	-	-	-	-	-	-	-	1
Vranidoll	1,053	533	520	1,051	-	-	1	-	-	1	-	-	-	-
Zllash	146	65	81	146	-	-	-	-	-	-	-	-	-	-
Zllatar	233	124	109	232	-	-	-	-	-	-	-	1	-	-
