= Bellopojë =

Village in Podujevo, Kosovo

- Village
- Interactive map of Bellopojë
- Coordinates: 42°48′36.39″N 21°11′42.22″E
- Country: Kosovo
- District: Prishtinë
- Municipality: Podujevë
- Elevation: 594 m (1,949 ft)

Population (2024)
  - Total: 1,192
- Time zone: UTC+1 (CET)
  - Summer (DST): UTC+2 (CEST)

Bellopojë is a village in the municipality of Podujevo, Kosovo.

== See also ==
- List of villages in Podujevo
