= Miroc =

Miroc can refer to:

- Miroc, Podujevo, a village in Kosovo
- Miroč, a mountain in Eastern Serbia
- Miroč (Majdanpek), a village in the municipality of Majdanpek in Serbia
