= Orllan =

Village in Podujevo, Kosovo

- Village
- Location within Kosovo
- Country: Kosovo
- District: Prishtinë
- Municipality: Podujevë

Population (2024)
  - Total: 451
- Time zone: UTC+1 (CET)
  - Summer (DST): UTC+2 (CEST)

Orllan is a village in the municipality of Podujevë, Kosovo. Zahir Pajaziti (1 November 1962 – 31 January 1997) was an Albanian commander of the Kosovo Liberation Army (UÇK). He originally hailed from this village and partially grew up here and went to school here. He was the first Commander of the UÇK, known as "First Gun of Freedom". He was killed on 31 January 1997 in a gunfight with Yugoslavian forces.

== See also ==
- Podujevë
