= Llapashticë e Poshtme =

Llapashticë e Poshtme: Llapashticë e Poshtme (Albanian); Доња Лапаштица/Donja Lapaštica (Serbian)
- Village
- Location within Kosovo
- Coordinates: 42°53′15″N 21°10′24″E
- Location: Kosovo
- District: Prishtinë
- Municipality: Podujevë
- Elevation: 598 m (1,962 ft)

Population (2024)
  - Total: 2,395
- Time zone: UTC+1 (CET)
  - Summer (DST): UTC+2 (CEST)

Llapashticë e Poshtme (Albanian: Llapashticë e Poshtme, Serbian Cyrillic: Доња Лапаштица/Donja Lapaštica) is a village in Podujevë municipality in Kosovo.
