= Kushevicë =

Village in Podujevo, Kosovo

- Village
- Country: Kosovo
- District: Prishtinë
- Municipality: Podujevë

Population (2024)
  - Total: 42
- Time zone: UTC+1 (CET)
  - Summer (DST): UTC+2 (CEST)

Kushevicë is a village in the municipality of Podujevo, Kosovo.

== See also ==
- Podujevo
