= Lupçi i Epërm =

Lupq i Epërm Gornje Ljupče
- Village
- Location in Kosovo
- Coordinates: 42°51′15″N 21°5′40″E
- Location: Kosovo
- District: Pristina
- Municipality: Podujevë
- Elevation: 751 m (2,464 ft)

Population (2024)
  - Total: 95
- Time zone: UTC+1 (Central European Time)
  - Summer (DST): UTC+2 (CEST)
- Postal code: 11050

Lupçi i epërm (in Albanian) or Gornje Ljupče or (in Serbian; Горње Љупче) is a village located in the municipality of Podujevo, District of Pristina, Kosovo.

== Geography ==
Lupçi i epërm is located on the gorge of Kaçandoll river (major tributary of the Llapi river). Village has a close geographical position toward four municipal centres in north-eastern Kosovo: Podujevo (10 km / 6 mi. ENE), Vushtrri (11 km / 7 mi. WSW), Mitrovica (19 km / 12 mi. W), Pristina (21 km / 13 mi. SSE).

Lupçi i epërm borders with three other villages, Popovë (Kështjellas) to the north, Majac to the south, and Zagorë (Municipality of Vushtrri) to the south-west. Main neighborhoods of the village itself are: Buzolli, Dushi, Menxhiqi and Grabovci.

== NDSH Insurgency 1945 - 1947 ==
After the WWII, the area was the sene of fighting between the Albanian National Democratic Army, military wing of Albanian National Democratic Movement (NDSH) and special units of the Yugoslav Army, the fighting lasted until February 1, 1947. In the final battle, thirteen nationalist guerrillas led by Shaban Bunjaku fought to the death. Yugoslav soldiers, continued with atrocities among local population and had executed five people from the village, on charges that they had provided aid and shelter to nationalist combatants.

On June 19, 2005, was discovered a mass grave with remains of warriors, in which besides thirteen fighters killed in the area, also were found the remains of other fighters, among them Ukshin Kovaçica.

== Kosovo War ==
During the Kosovo War, the town was under firm control of local Territorial Defence unit under coordination of Kosovo Liberation Army.

During the time of conflict number of civilians was seeking shelter in the area. It was reported that UNHCR arranged delivery of food and blankets for the IDPs scattered at Gornje Ljupče. Because of its central position in the gorge of Kaçanoll river area, which was under complete control of KLA, it was relatively a safe area with the distance of around 7 km (except during May 1999) from the Lupçi i poshtëm frontline between KLA and Serbian forces. On `15 1999, during the air campaign of NATO on targets in FR Yugoslavia, NATO airplanes landed four missiles against Yugoslav forces surrounding the village.

According to the Serbian sources, area which included also nearby villages, was scene of around three thousand local non-uniformed armed force.
