= Letanc =

Letanc: Letanc (Albanian); Летанце/Letance (Serbian)
- Village
- Location within Kosovo
- Coordinates: 42.930512°N 21.185937°E
- Location: Kosovo
- District: Prishtinë
- Municipality: Podujevë
- Elevation: 614 m (2,014 ft)

Population (2024)
  - Total: 2,118
- Time zone: UTC+1 (CET)
  - Summer (DST): UTC+2 (CEST)

Letanc (Albanian: Letanc, Serbian Cyrillic: Летанце/Letance) is a village in Podujevë municipality.
