= Sfeçël =

Sfeçël Svećnje
- Village
- Location in Kosovo
- Location: Kosovo
- District: Pristina
- Municipality: Podujevë

Population (2024)
  - Total: 1,398
- Time zone: UTC+1 (CET)
  - Summer (DST): UTC+2 (CEST)

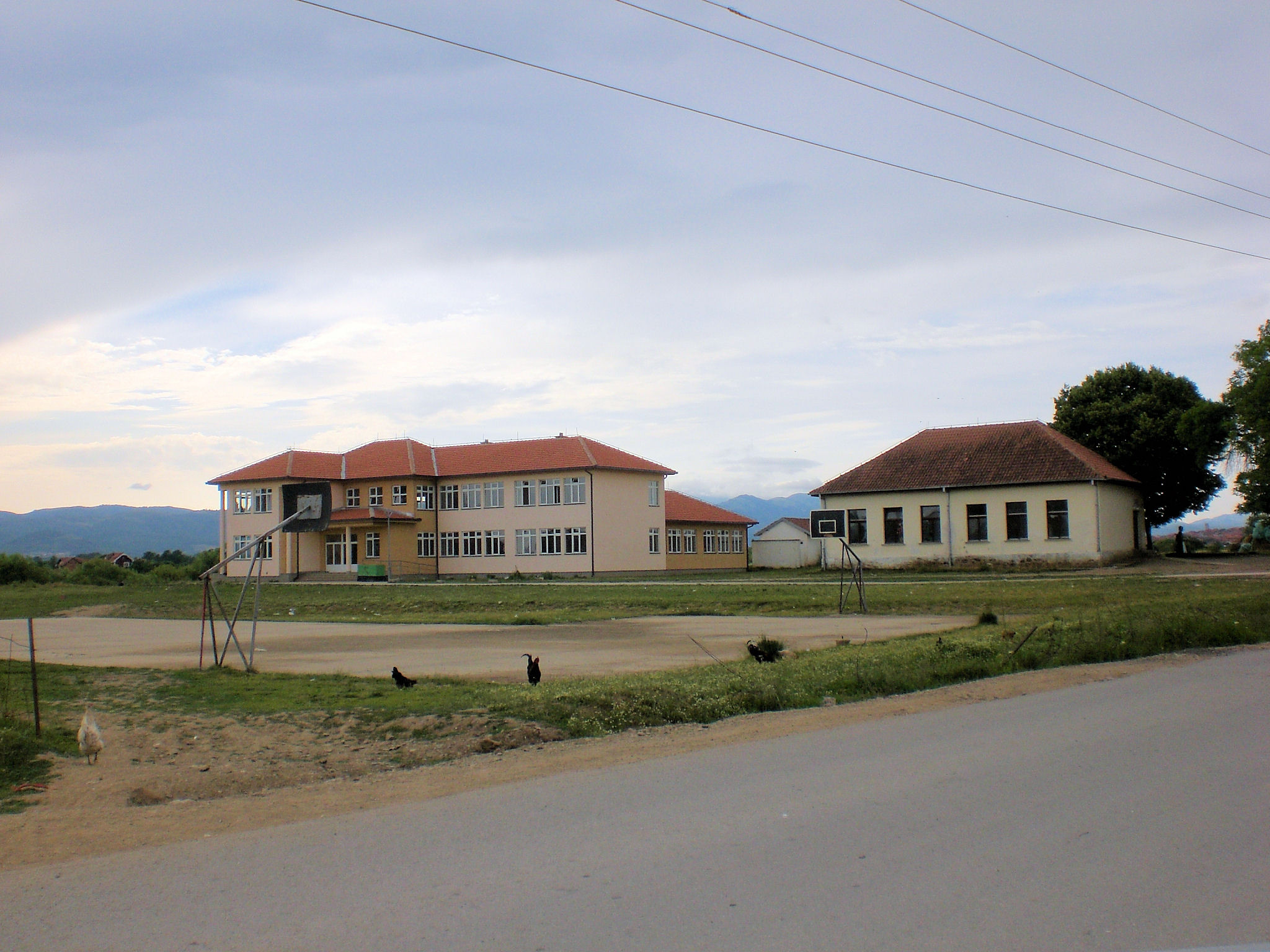

Sfeçël (in Albanian) or Svećnje (in Serbian) is a village in the municipality of Podujevo, Kosovo.
