= Bradash =

Bradash: Bradash (Albanian); Брадаш/Bradaš (Serbian)
- Town
- Interactive map of Bradash
- Coordinates: 42.939905°N 21.138846°E
- Location: Kosovo
- District: Prishtinë
- Municipality: Podujevë
- Elevation: 660 m (2,170 ft)

Population (2024)
  - Total: 1,948
- Time zone: UTC+1 (CET)
  - Summer (DST): UTC+2 (CEST)

Bradash (Albanian: Bradash, Serbian Cyrillic: Брадаш/Bradaš) is a small town in Kosovo in the district of Prishtina. Bradash was populated by Albanians who came from the Gashi tribe who settled there and many others came from Mitrovica.
