= Pestovë =

Pestovë Pestovo / Пестово
- Village
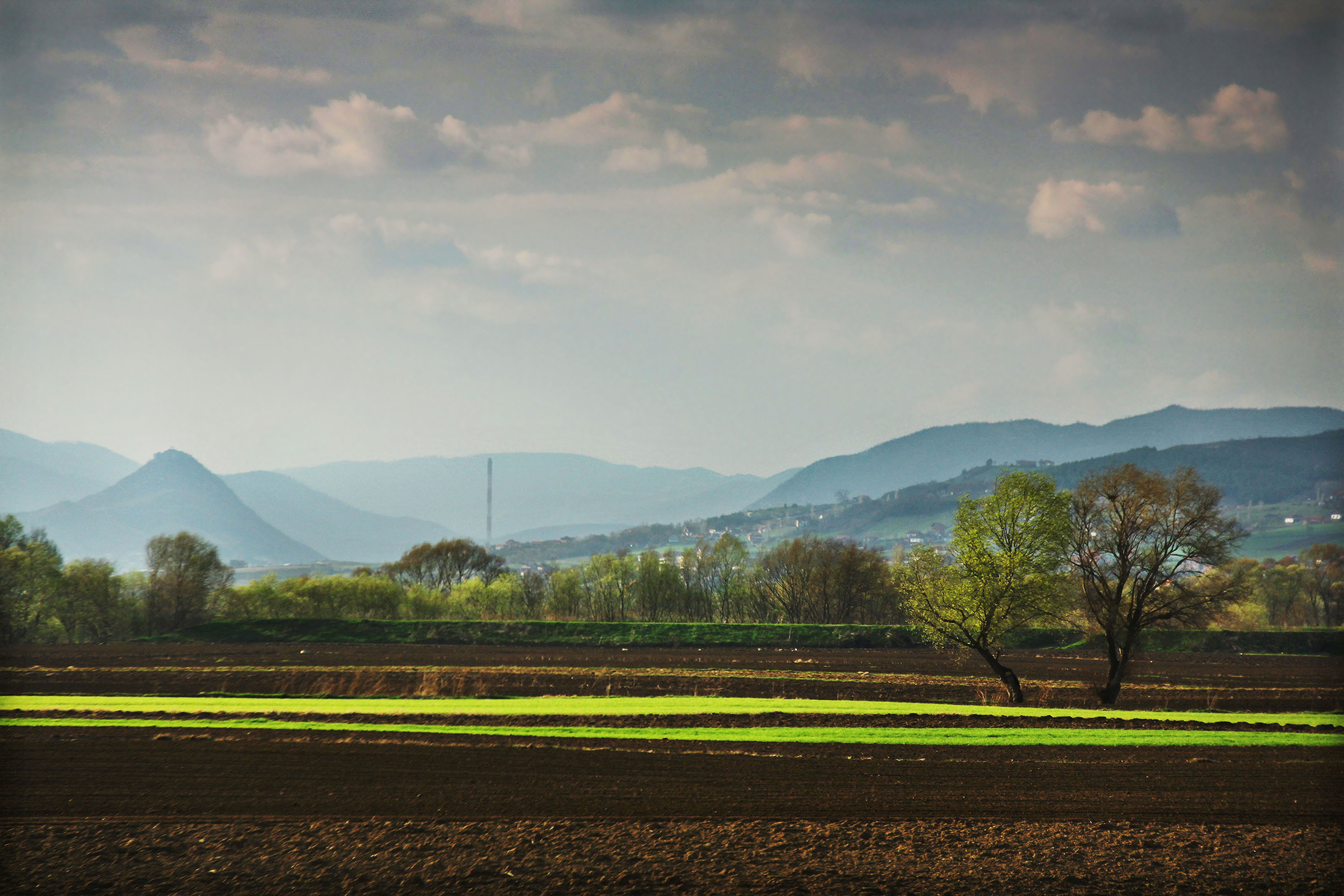
- Pestovë is known especially of potato.

- Location within Kosovo
- Coordinates: 42.7843657°N 21.0007692°E
- Location: Kosovo
- District: Mitrovica
- Municipality: Vushtrri
- Time zone: UTC+1 (CET)
  - Summer (DST): UTC+2 (CEST)

Pestovë is a village in the municipality of Vushtrri, Kosovo.

== History ==
Pestovë was the site of ambush on 31 January 1997, in which one of the founders and commandant of the Kosovo Liberation Army (KLA), Zahir Pajaziti was ambushed by Serbian Police Units (MUP) together with two of his comrades, Edmond Hoxha and Hakif Zejnullahu. All three were killed.

== Economy ==
The municipality of Vushtrri, including the village of Pestovë, is known for cultivating potato. Potato Day is an annual celebration in Pestovë which for many years has turned into a traditional holiday and is celebrated on the occasion of the harvest of potatoes and other crops.

== See also ==
- Pestovë Ambush
- Pestova (archaeological site)
