= Sinan Pasha Mosque (Prizren) =

Ottoman-era mosque in Prizren, Kosovo

- Albanian: Xhamia e Sinan Pashës; Serbian: Синан-пашина џамија
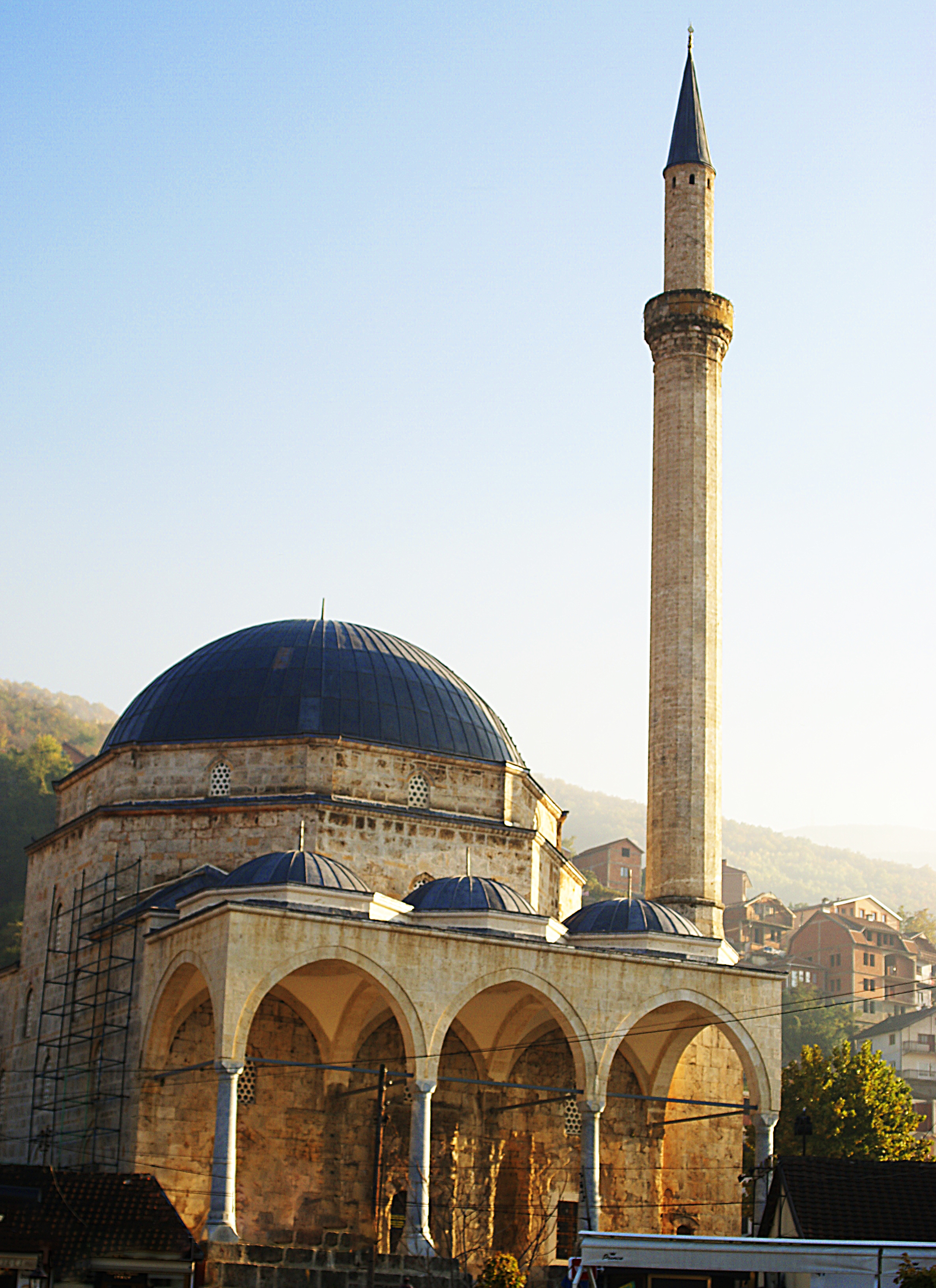

- Sinan Pasha Mosque within Kosovo

Religion
- Affiliation: Sunni Islam
- Status: preserved

Location
- Location: Prizren
- Country: Kosovo
- Coordinates: 42°12′31″N 20°44′29″E

Architecture
- Type: Mosque
- Style: Ottoman
- Groundbreaking: 1600 or 1608
- Completed: 1615; 411 years ago

Specifications
- Length: 14 m (46 ft)
- Width: 14 m (46 ft)
- Minaret: 1
- Minaret height: 43.5 m (143 ft)
- Materials: stone

Cultural Heritage under Permanent Protection
- Official name: Xhamia e Sinana Pashës
- Type: Architectural Heritage: Monument/Ensemble
- Reference no.: 337

The Sinan Pasha Mosque (Albanian: Xhamia e Sinan Pashës; Serbian: Синан пашина Џамија / Sinan pašina džamija; Turkish: Sinan Paşa Camii) is an Ottoman-era mosque in the city of Prizren, Kosovo built by the Ottoman Albanian pasha Sofi Sinan in 1615. The mosque overlooks the main street of Prizren and is a dominant feature in the town's skyline.

== History ==
Sofi Sinan Pasha started construction of the mosque in either 1600 or 1608. Sofi Sinan Pasha, a native Albanian from Prizren and former beylerbey and kaymakam in Bosnia should not be confused with grand vizier Sinan Pasha, who built the Sinan Pasha Mosque in the nearby city of Kaçanik.

M. Maksimović considers that the stones used to build the mosque were taken from nearby Holy Archangels Monastery. Hasan Kaleshi, however, sustained in 1972 that Sofi Sinan Pasha couldn't have possibly ordered any monastery destruction as this was impossible without a Sultan decree, rather, he ordered the use of the spare stones to a better deed as ordered by the Sultan.

Sinan Pasha Mosque was declared a Monument of Culture of Exceptional Importance in 1990 by the Republic of Serbia.

== Description ==
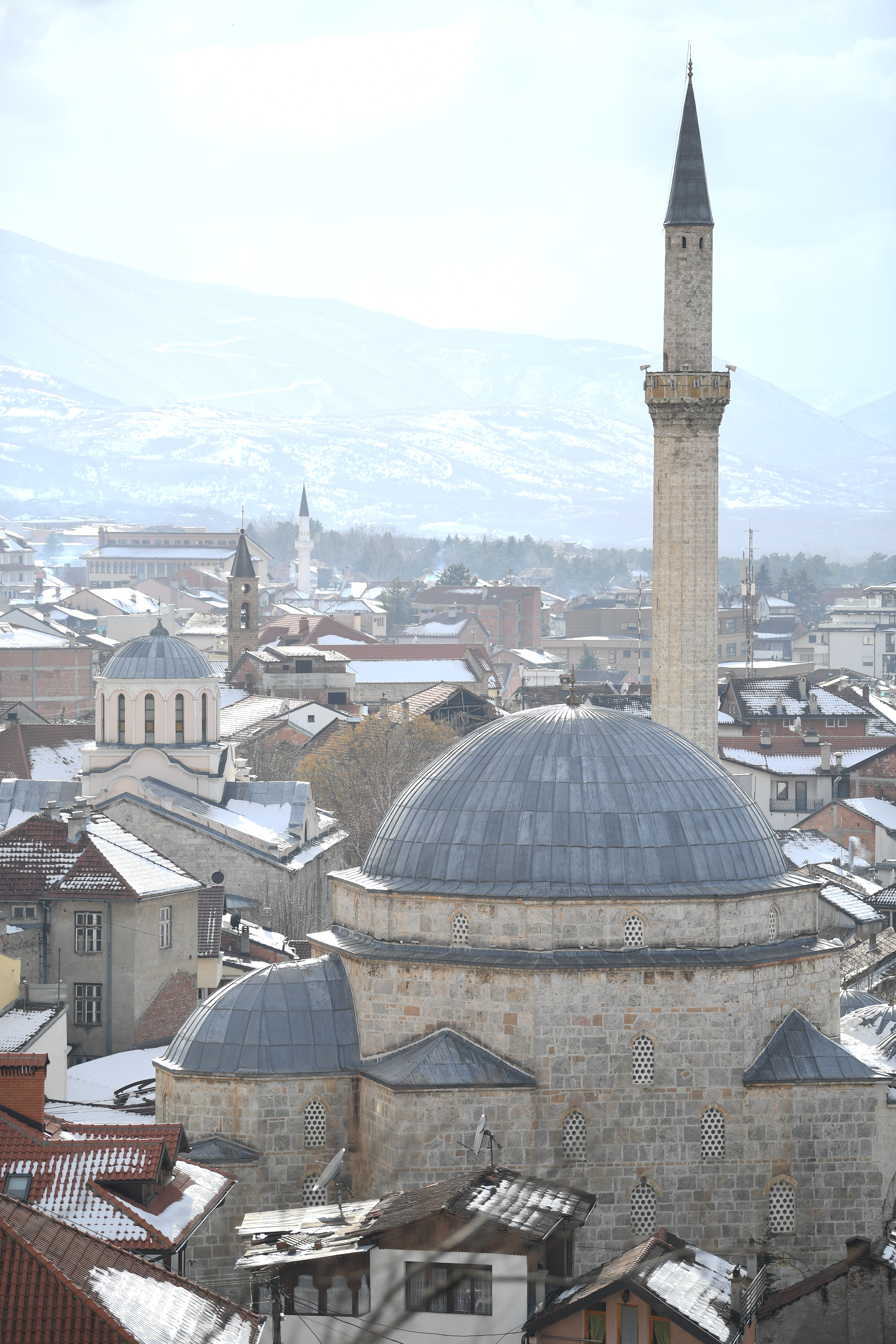
Sinan Pasha Mosque during the winter

The mosque covers roughly 14 m (46 ft) by 14 m (46 ft) and is square in shape. It has one large dome and another smaller half-dome that covers the mihrab, which is painted and has a stalactite hood. The mosque's walls are 1.65 m (5.4 ft) thick and its minaret, which is topped by a conical structure covered by lead, is 43.5 m (143 ft) in height.

The walls and dome inside Sinan Pasha Mosque were painted in the 19th century, mostly of floral patterns and Qur'an verses. The minbar is painted with floral motives. Both the large dome and the half-dome of the mosque are covered with lead. The stone flooring of the mosque and the carpentry are original.

== Preservation concerns ==
Rain, which over time has entered the mosque via holes in the roof, has caused the loss of some original paintings on the walls and has led to the detachment of some of the wall plaster. Stones of the façade have faced weathering.

Abdullah Gërguri worked on a series of repairs of the murals, particularly in the 1970s.

In early 2000 the cost to rehabilitate the building was estimated at €500,000 by UNESCO.

== Manuscripts and use of building controversy ==
The Prizren municipality intended to build a library within the mosque in order to preserve not only the original Ottoman manuscripts found in the mosque, but also other valuable ones that can be found all over Kosovo. However, the Islamic Union of Kosovo filed a lawsuit against the Prizren Municipality in order to not allow the mosque to become a museum, but instead to have it continue to be a religious building.

== See also ==
- Architecture of Kosovo
- Islam in Kosovo
- Religion in Kosovo
