= Sallabajë =

Sallabajë Bajë e Llapit
- Coordinates: 42°49′10″N 21°9′29″E
- Country: Kosovo
- District: Pristina
- Municipality: Podujevo
- Elevation: 613 m (2,011 ft)

Population (2024)
  - Total: 408
- Time zone: UTC+1
  - Summer (DST): UTC+2

Sallabajë is a village in the Podujevo municipality of Kosovo that has also been known since 1999 as Bajëllap or Bajë e Llapit.

== Geography ==
Sallabajë is located on the highway between Pristina and Podujevo and lies around 15 km south of Podujevo.

For many years, the area has been popular for its hot spring. The one village road abuts the railway and the privately owned meadow from whence the spring flows. The views from the spring are modest, but the village has historic value.

== History ==
The town’s main claim to fame is in chronicles of the Battle of Kosovo, in which it is said that Miloš Obilić, a nobleman felled in said battle, is buried under the church altar.
