= Hakif Zejnullahu =

Kosovo Liberation Army soldier

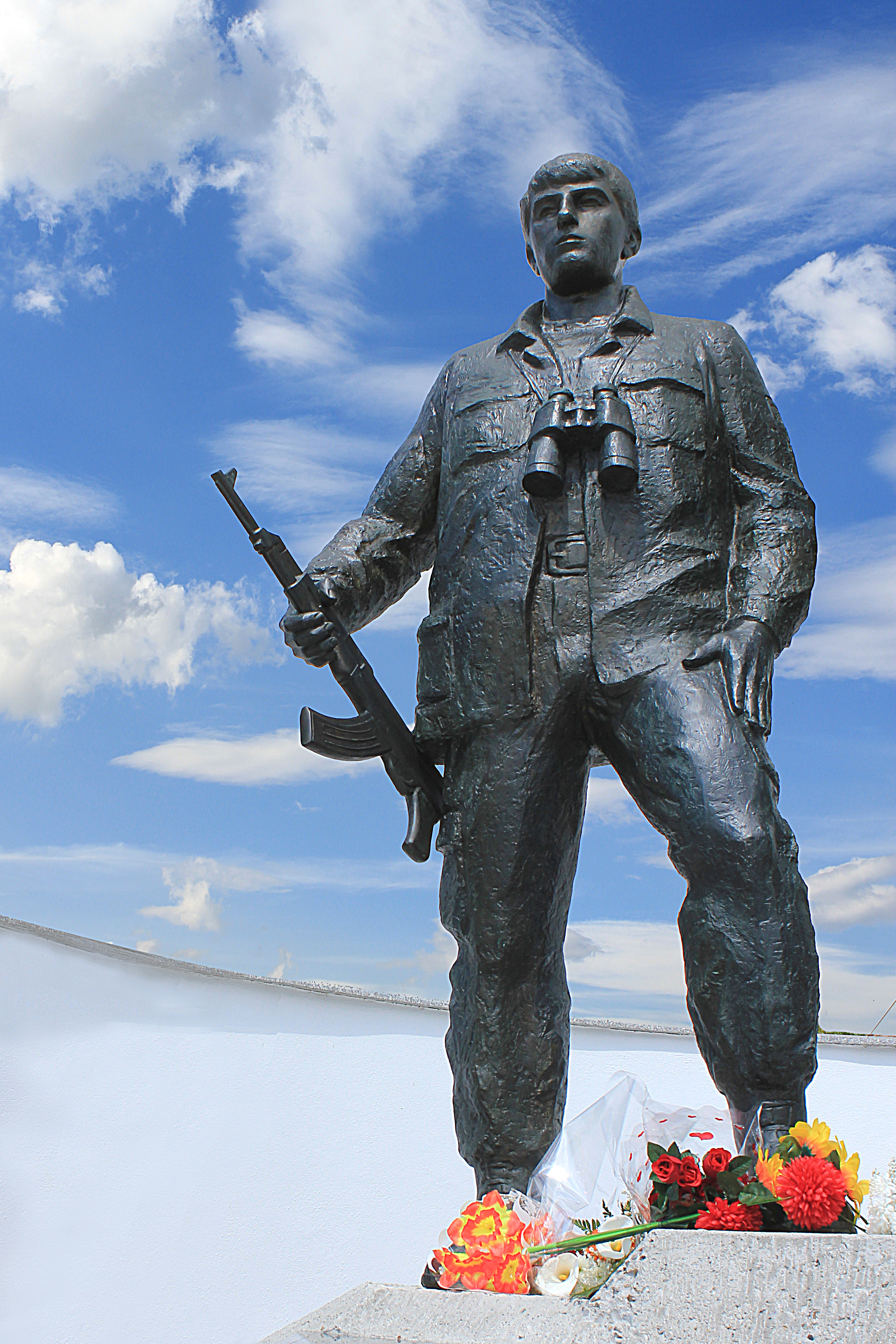
- Statue of Zejnullahu in Lladoc
- Born: 22 June 1962; Lladoc, Podujevë, SFR Yugoslavia (today Kosovo)
- Died: 31 January 1997 (aged 34); Pestovë, Vushtrri, FR Yugoslavia (today Kosovo)
- Military career
- Allegiance: Kosova
- Branch: Kosovo Liberation Army
- Service years: 1995–1997
- Rank: Commander
- Conflicts: Insurgency in Kosovo (1995–98): Pestovë Ambush †
- Awards: Hero of Kosovo (posthumously)

Hakif Zejnullahu (22 June 1962 – 31 January 1997) was one of the founders and early commanders of the Kosovo Liberation Army, who died in the Pestovë Ambush, together with Zahir Pajaziti and Edmond Hoxha. He is regarded as a prominent leader and one of the most influentional figures of the KLA.

== Early life ==
Hakif Zejnullahu was born on June 22, 1962, in the village of Lladoc, in the municipality of Podujevë. He received his primary education in his village and later attended high school in Podujevë. From a young age, he was influenced by the stories of resistance from his family and community, especially those involving Kosovo's struggle against the Serbian regime after WW2, particularly the mass displacement of Albanians to Turkey. His village, located near the Serbian border, frequently experienced violent encounters with Serbian paramilitary forces, which shaped Hakif's early worldview.

Growing up during the time of political unrest and the push for Kosovo's liberation, Zejnullahu's formative years were marked by his involvement in political activism. By the age of 19, he was actively participating in the protests and movements that defined the political landscape of the late early 1980s. His education in national ideals was closely tied to the legacy of resistance in his community and he quickly became aligned with prominent figures in the liberation movement, including his cousin Zahir Pajaziti.

== Involvement in the Kosovo Liberation Army ==
=== Founding the KLA and first actions ===
By the early 1990s, as Kosovo's oppression by the Serbian government intensified, Hakif became one of the early supporters and organizers of armed resistance. In 1989, he was closely associated with the formation of the "Çeta e Llapit," an armed group that sought to resist Serbian oppression through guerrilla tactics. This group laid the foundation for what would later become the Kosovo Liberation Army.

In 1992, Hakif attempted to travel to Albania to receive military training, but unknown circumstances delayed his involvement in direct combat. However he remained active in supporting and organizing resistance efforts. In 1995, when the KLA was formally established, Hakif, alongside Zahir Pajaziti, was instrumental in coordinating the group's early activities. His home in Lladoc became the first base of the KLA, where strategic operations were planned and heavy weapons were stored.

=== Insurgency in Kosovo ===
As a member of the KLA, Zejnullahu was known for his organizational skills. He handpicked young men from Llap and Pristina to join the fight for Kosovo's freedom. Throughout the mid-1990s, he was heavily involved in planning and executing military operations against Serbian forces, and he financed much of the KLA's activities through his own resources.

Hakif was also known for his deep bond with his cousin Zahir Pajaziti, with whom he organized many protests and demonstrations. Together, they strategized numerous successful KLA operations. Hakif's logistical support was vital to the early actions of the KLA, including the smuggling of arms from Albania and the safe transport of KLA fighters.

== Death ==
On January 31, 1997, Hakif Zejnullahu was killed in an ambush by Serbian police forces in the village of Pestovë, Vushtrri, alongside Zahir Pajaziti and Edmond Hoxha. The three were returning from a mission when their vehicle, a green Lada, was attacked. Despite the immediate discovery of their bodies, the car in which they were ambushed was not found until after the end of the war. Zejnullahu was buried on the next day in his home village of Lladoc.

== Legacy ==
In recognition of his sacrifice, the President of Kosovo Atifete Jahjaga posthumously awarded him and his fellow fighter Edmond Hoxha with the "Hero of Kosovo" decoration in 2013, the highest honor bestowed by the state. In 2023, on the 26th anniversary of the deaths, they were remembered by the current President of Kosovo and Prime Minister of Kosovo.

Zejnullahu's name is honored in several ways across Kosovo. The Kosovo Security Force garrison near Lupç, a sports hall in Podujevë, and several streets in cities like Pristina and Vushtrri are named after him.

Additionally, a monument has been erected at the site of his death in Pestovë to honor him, Zahir Pajaziti and Edmond Hoxha. His childhood home in Lladoc has been turned into a memorial complex and the car, in which they were killed, displayed in the courtyard of his house, has become a symbol and a tribute of his life and sacrifice.

== See also ==
- Zahir Pajaziti
