= Pestovo ambush =

1997 attack in the insurgency in Kosovo

- Part of Insurgency in Kosovo (1995–1998)
Date	31 January 1997
Location	Pestovo, Vučitrn, FR Yugoslavia
Result	Yugoslav victory

Belligerents
Kosovo Liberation Army	FR Yugoslavia

Commanders and leaders
Zahir Pajaziti †; Edmond Hoxha †; Hakif Zejnullahu †	(Federal Republic of Yugoslavia) Vlastimir Đorđević

Strength
3 fighters	(Federal Republic of Yugoslavia) Unknown

Casualties and losses
3 killed	(Federal Republic of Yugoslavia) None

The Pestovo ambush was an attack perpetrated by Serbian Police Units (MUP) to eliminate Kosovo Liberation Army (KLA) founder Zahir Pajaziti and his fellow commanders Edmond Hoxha and Hakif Zejnullahu. It resulted in the deaths of all three commanders.

== Attack ==
On January 31, 1997, Kosovo Liberation Army commander Zahir Pajaziti and his assistants Edmond Hoxha and Hakif Zejnullahu were traveling in the same car together on the highway from Priština to Kosovska Mitrovica. In the village of Pestovo, near Vučitrn, Yugoslav policemen set up an ambush and opened fire on the car, killing all three.

== Aftermath and legacy ==
The car in which they were killed in is stored as an artifact in the courtyard of the first KLA military base, in a village of Podujevo. In 2008, the president of Kosovo, Fatmir Sejdiu, declared Pajaziti a Hero of Kosovo. He is commemorated by a statue on Mother Teresa Boulevard in Prishtina.
