= Velika Reka =

Velika Reka Велика Река
- Village (Selo)
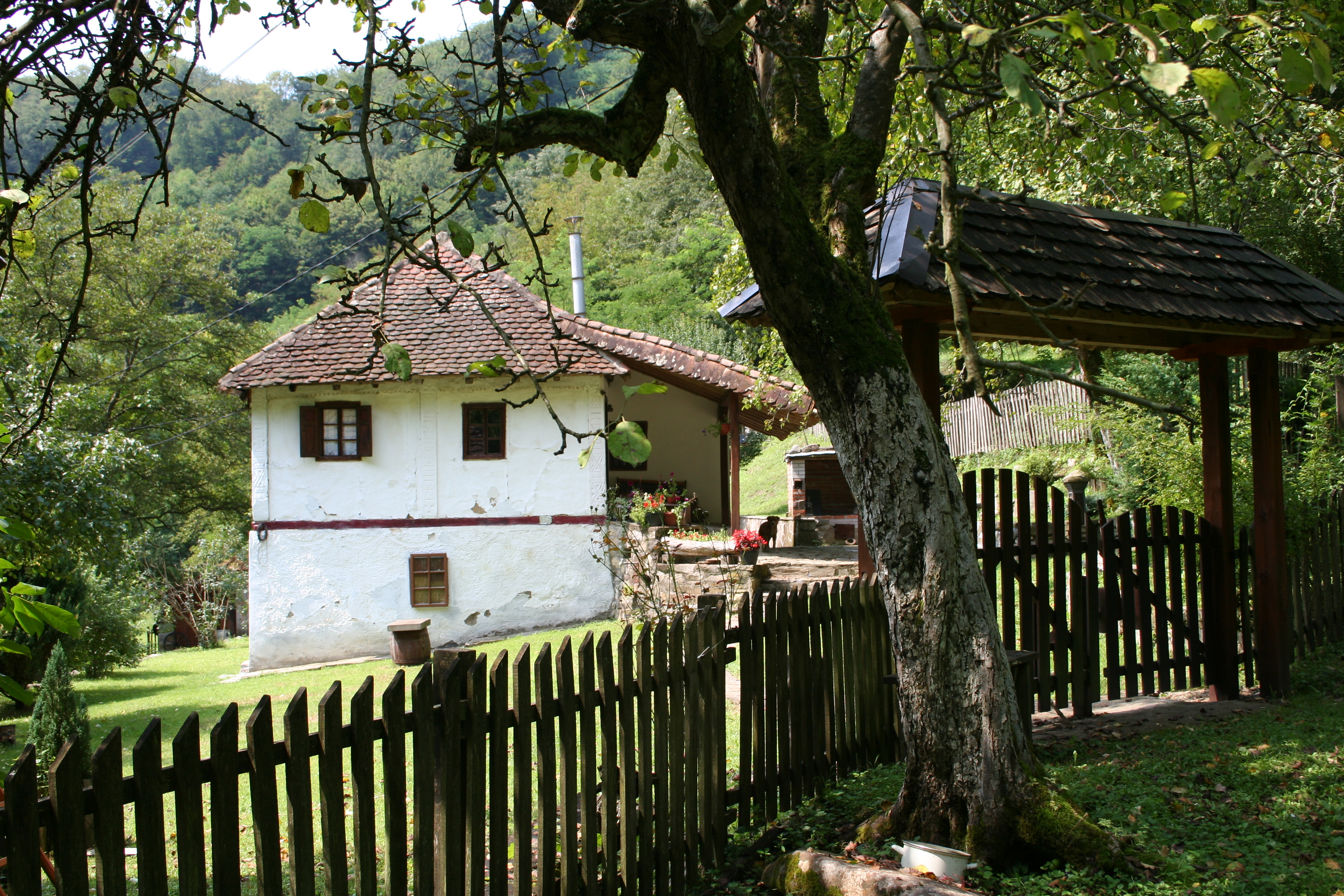
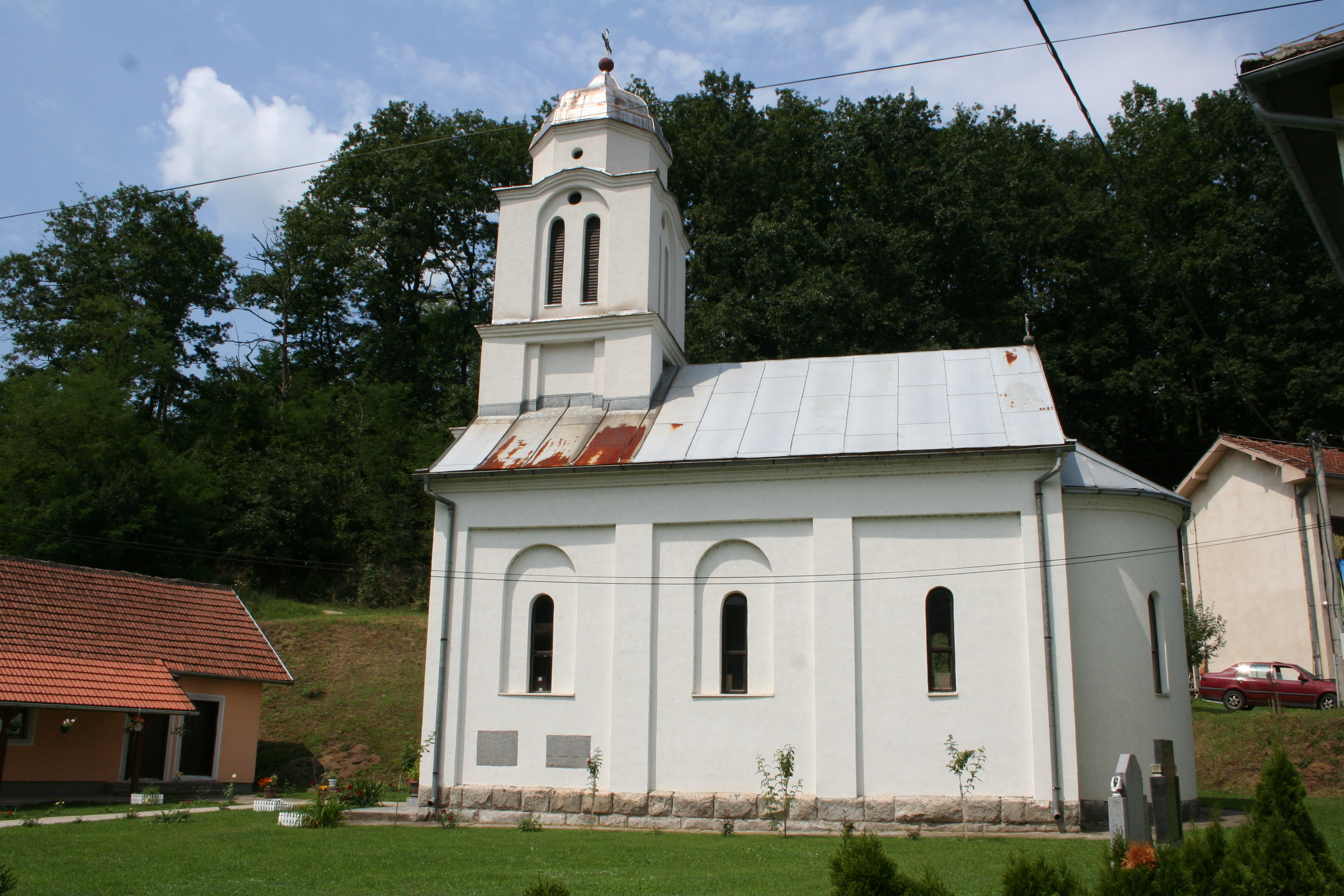
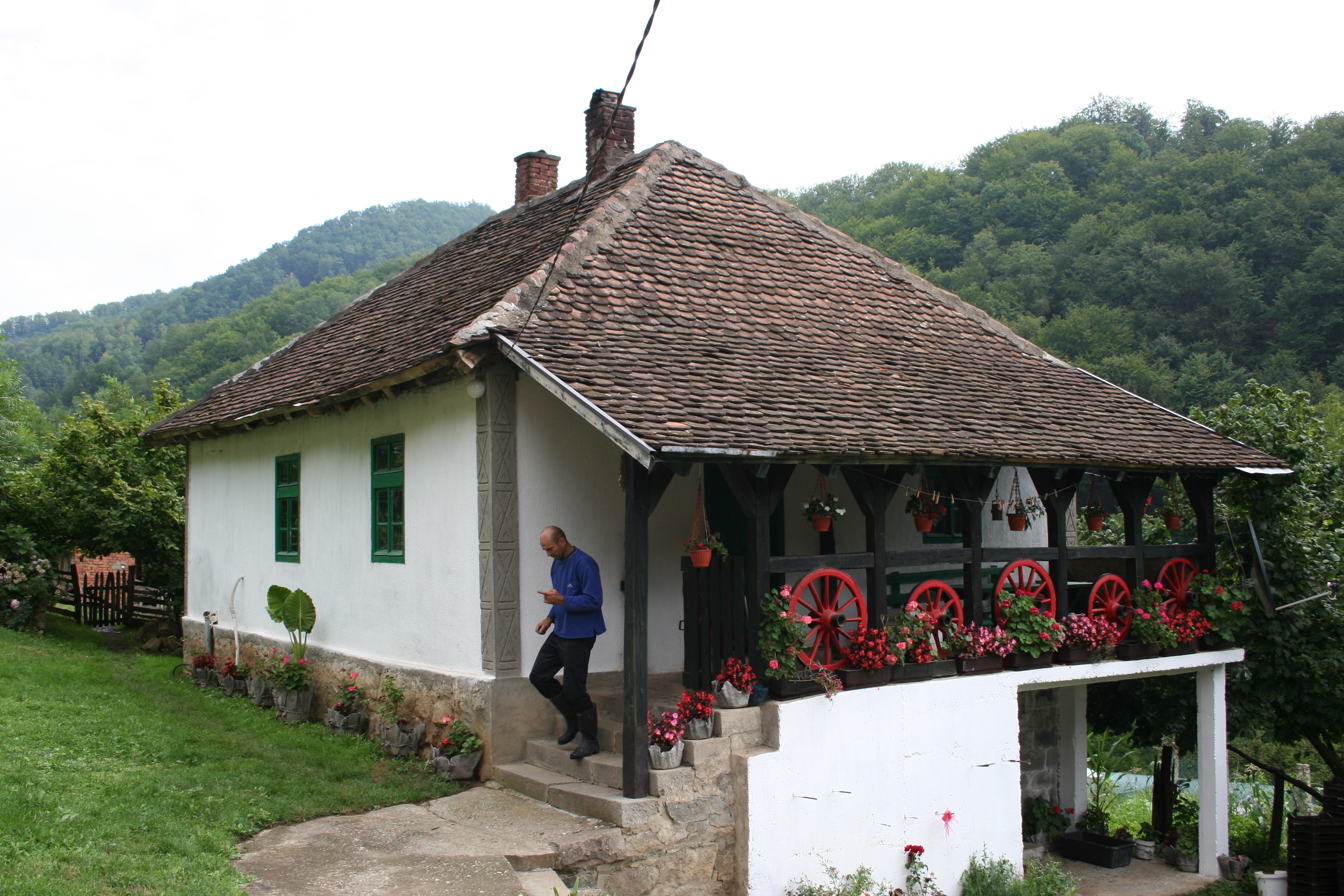
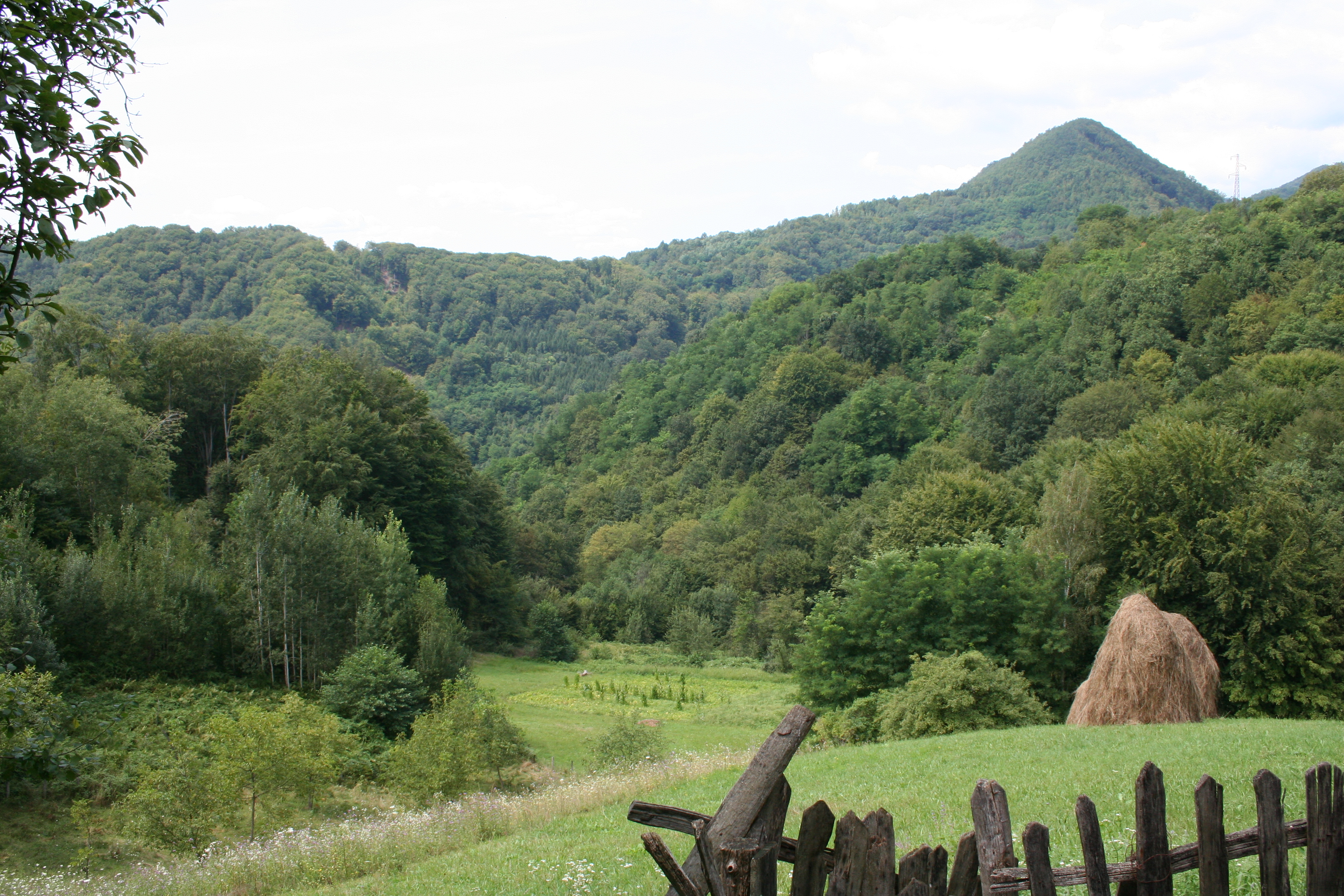

- Location within Serbia
- Coordinates: 44°16′13″N 19°13′38″E
- Country: Serbia
- Municipality: Mali Zvornik
- Time zone: UTC+1 (CET)
  - Summer (DST): UTC+2 (CEST)

Velika Reka (Serbian Cyrillic: Велика Река) is a village in Serbia. It is situated in the Mali Zvornik municipality, in the Mačva District of Central Serbia. The village has a Serb ethnic majority with a population of 476 (2002 census).

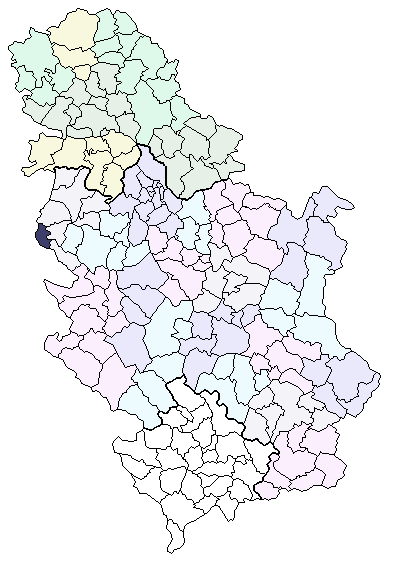
Location of the Mali Zvornik municipality in Serbia

== Historical population ==
- 1948: 661
- 1953: 721
- 1961: 680
- 1971: 652
- 1981: 472
- 1991: 521
- 2002: 476

Historical population
Year	Pop.	±%
1948	661	—
1953	721	+9.1%
1961	680	−5.7%
1971	652	−4.1%
1981	472	−27.6%
1991	521	+10.4%
2002	476	−8.6%
2011	373	−21.6%

== See also ==
- List of places in Serbia
