= Repe (river) =

River in Germany

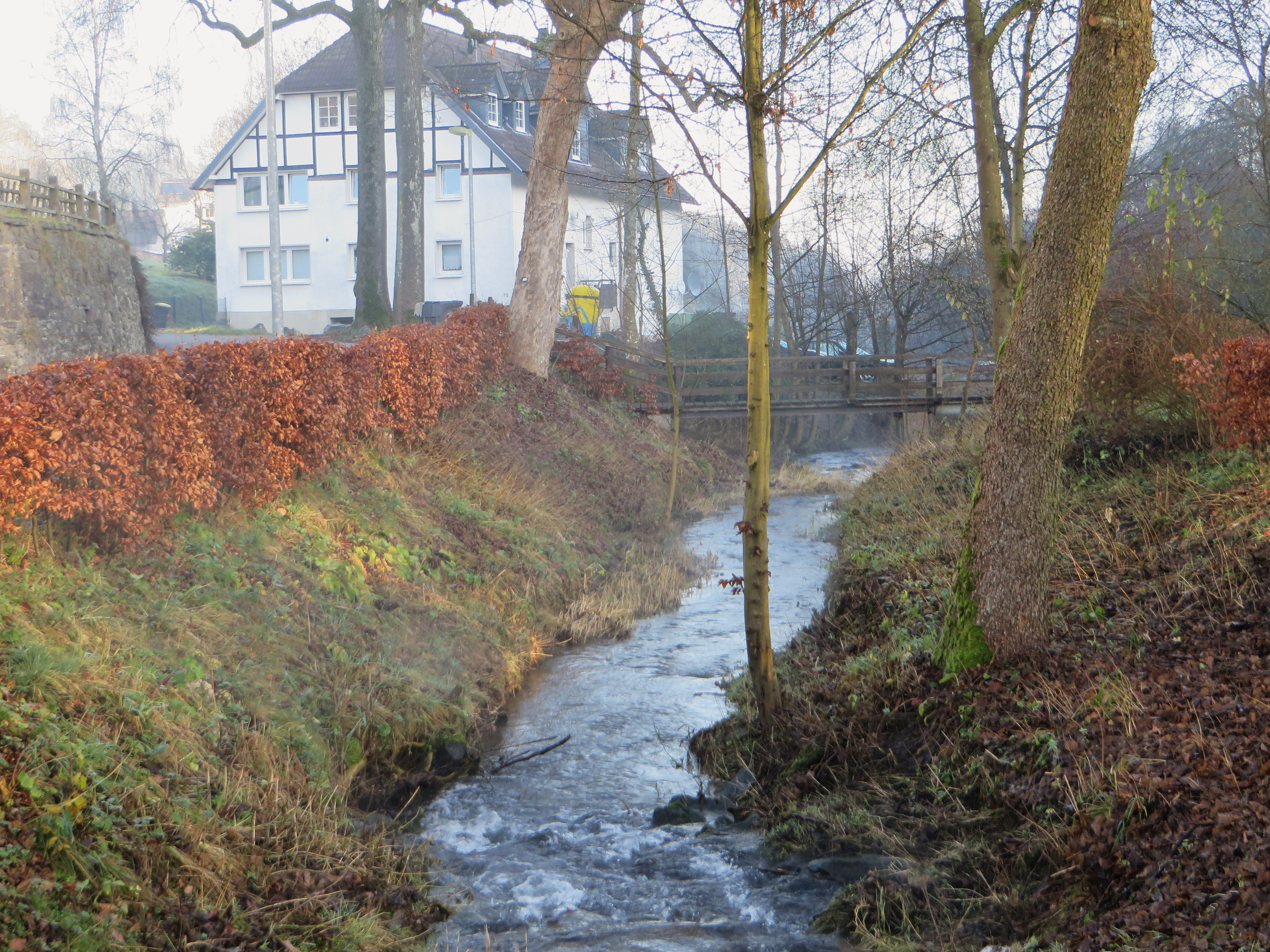

Location
- Country: Germany
- State: North Rhine-Westphalia

Physical characteristics
- Mouth
  - location: Lenne
  - coordinates: 51.1490°N 7.9977°E
- Length: 11.4 km (7.1 mi)

Basin features
- Progression: Lenne→ Ruhr→ Rhine→ North Sea

Repe (German pronunciation: [ˈʁeːpə]) is a river of North Rhine-Westphalia, Germany. It flows into the Lenne near Finnentrop.

== See also ==
- List of rivers of North Rhine-Westphalia
