= Majac =

Majac Majance
- Village
- Location in Kosovo
- Coordinates: 42°48′48″N 21°8′5″E
- Location: Kosovo
- District: Pristina
- Municipality: Podujevë
- Elevation: 655 m (2,149 ft)

Population (2024)
  - Total: 1,038
- Time zone: UTC+1 (Central European Time)
  - Summer (DST): UTC+2 (CEST)
- Postal code: 11050

Majac (Serbian: Majance) is a village located in the Municipality of Podujevë, District of Pristina, Kosovo.

== Notable people ==
- Ardian Ismajli, Albanian footballer
