= Dvorishtë =

Village in Podujevo, Kosovo

- Village
- Interactive map of Dvorishtë
- Country: Kosovo
- District: Prishtinë
- Municipality: Podujevë
- Elevation: 608 m (1,995 ft)

Population (2024)
  - Total: 59
- Time zone: UTC+1 (CET)
  - Summer (DST): UTC+2 (CEST)

Dvorishtë is a village in the municipality of Podujevo, Kosovo.

== See also ==
- Podujevo
