= Popovë =

Popovë Popovë or Popova (Albanian) Popovo (Serbian)
- Village
- Location in Kosovo
- Coordinates: 42°52′48″N 21°5′24″E
- Location: Kosovo
- District: Pristina
- Municipality: Podujevë

Area
  - Total: 17.59 km^{2} (6.79 sq mi)
- Elevation: 751 m (2,464 ft)

Population (2024)
  - Total: 65
  - Density: 3.7/km^{2} (9.6/sq mi)
- Time zone: UTC+1 (Central European Time)
  - Summer (DST): UTC+2 (CEST)
- Postal code: 11050

Popovë or Kështjellas is a village located in the Municipality of Podujevo, Kosovo.

== Geography ==
Village is located on the gorge of Kaçandoll river (major tributary of the Llapi river). The village has a close geographical position toward four Municipal Centers in North-eastern Kosovo: Podujevo (9 kilometres (5.6 mi)), Vushtrri (12 kilometres (7.5 mi)), Mitrovica (18 kilometres (11 mi)), Pristina (24 kilometres (15 mi)).
