= Zahir Pajaziti =

Commander of the Kosovo Liberation Army (1962–1997)

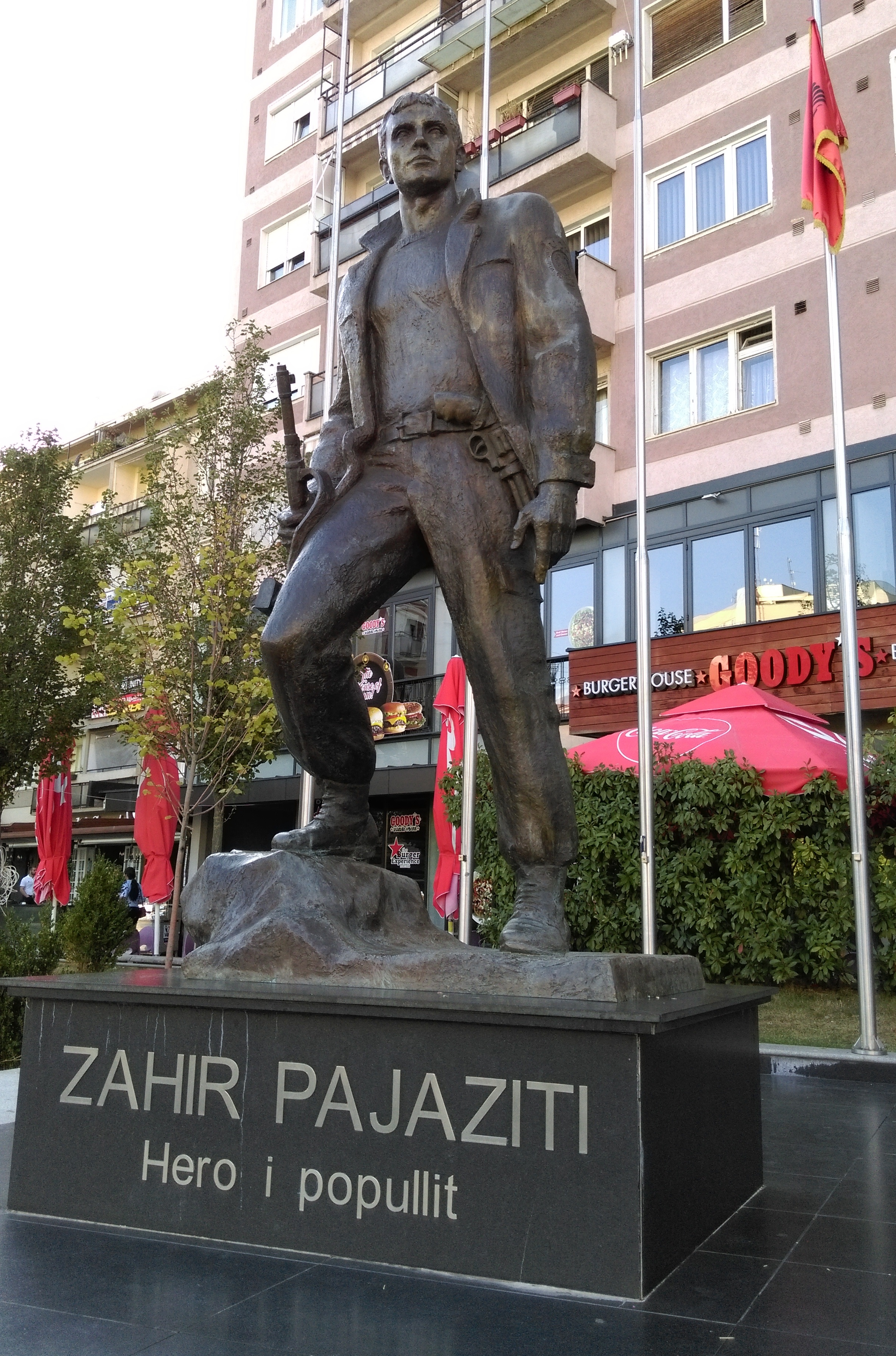
- Statue of Zahir Pajaziti in Prishtina
- Born: 1 November 1962; Turuçicë, Podujevë, PR Serbia, FPR Yugoslavia (now Kosovo)
- Died: 31 January 1997 (aged 34) Pestovë, Vushtrri, FR Yugoslavia (now Kosovo)
- Allegiance: Kosova
- Branch: Kosovo Liberation Army
- Rank: Commander
- Commands: Llap region, Kosovo
- Conflicts: Insurgency in Kosovo (1995–98): Surkish ambush; Pestovë Ambush †
- Awards: Hero of Kosovo (posthumously)

Zahir Pajaziti (1 November 1962 – 31 January 1997) was one of the founders and early commanders of Kosovo Liberation Army. He was the first Commander of the KLA, known as "First Gun of Freedom".

== Early life ==
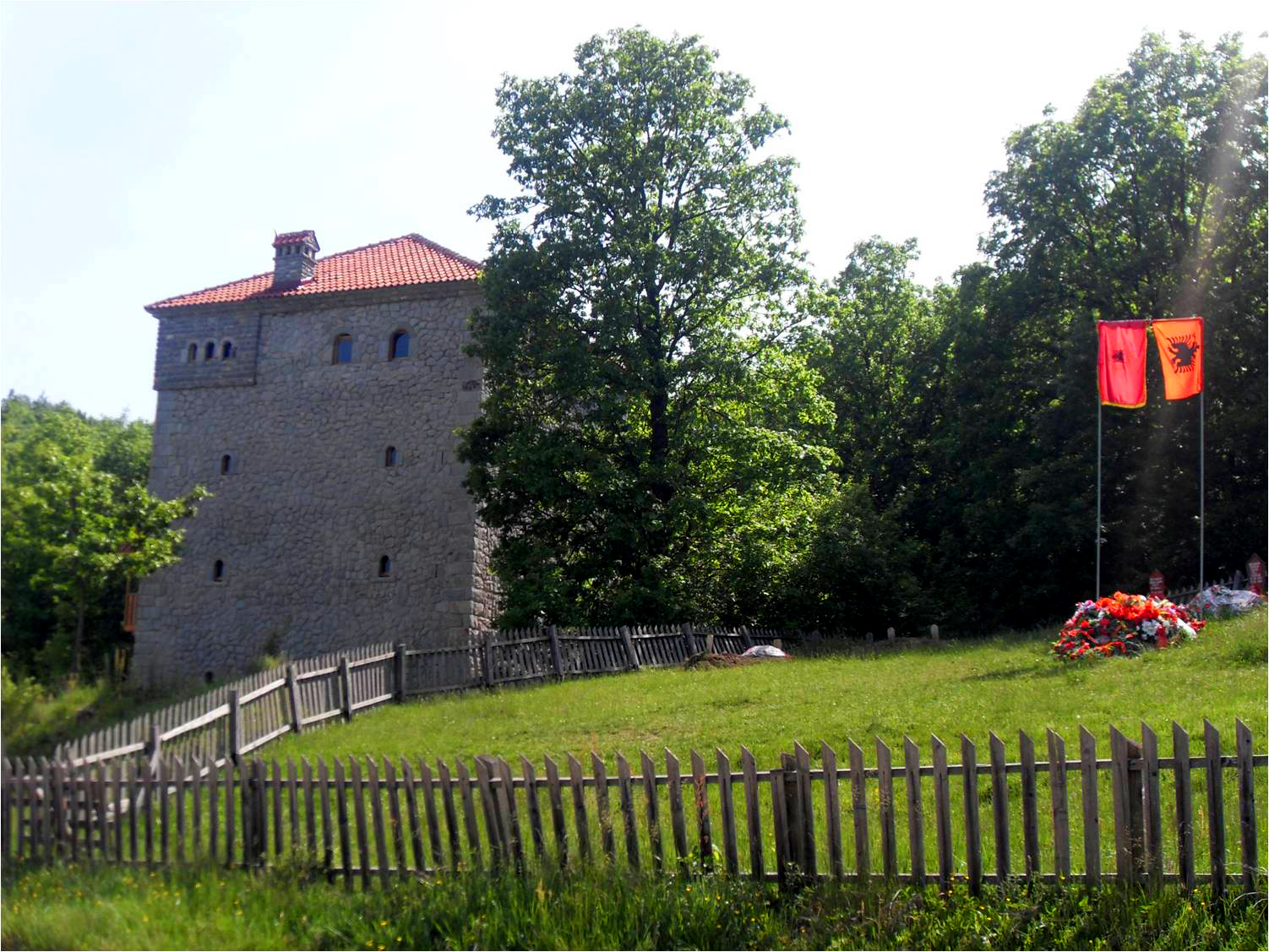
The Kulla of Zahir Pajaziti in the village of Orllan, Podujevë

Zahir Pajaziti was born in the village of Turuçicë in Podujevë. He originally hailed from the village of Orllan in the Llap region, where he also grew up. His father, Qerimi, and mother, Fatimja, both Albanian, had raised their five sons and two daughters with great difficulty, also enabling their education. He completed primary school in his hometown. In the 1976-1977 school year, he enrolled in the Police High School in Vushtrri. In the second year of teaching, the principal expelled him from the school on the pretext that he had not respected the school's disciplinary order.

He completed the second year of secondary schooling in Orllan, while the last two years he finished at the educational center "8 Nëntori" in Podujevë. In the summer of 1980, together with two of his friends, he went to communist Albania. He had crossed the border illegally through the Buna river and stayed there for 18 days. After returning from Albania, Zahiri was tortured by Yugoslav Security inspectors.

In the 1981-1982 school year, Zahir Pajaziti enrolled in the English Language Department of the Faculty of Philology of the University of Pristina.

He took an active part in the progressive youth demonstrations which broke out in March and April 1981 in Pristina. A year later, before starting his second year of studies, he received an invitation to be recruited into the Yugoslav People's Army (JNA). After completing the first twelve months of this service, he used the right to pause, to later complete the following three months in Belgrade, in 1985. At that time, Zahir became aware of the repression and violence exercised by the Yugoslav regime, especially against Albanian recruits, who were punished and in some cases even killed at the hands of the secret service of the Yugoslav army (KOS).

== Life ==
After the breakup of Yugoslavia in 1992, Pajaziti remained in Kosovo while battles raged in Croatia and Bosnia and Herzegovina. At the Tirana military academy in Albania he undertook military training and later with the ascension of Sali Berisha to power, his government arrested Pajaziti in 1995. Later at two secret camps in Tropojë and Kukës owned by the Albanian army close to the Albania-Kosovo border, Pajaziti along with Agim Ramadani and Sali Çekaj organised military training for Albanians from Kosovo.

Pajaziti joined the Kosovo Liberation Army (KLA) in 1994. He and his group developed in the Llap region of Kosovo. Pajaziti, Sali Çekaj and Adem Jashari were the leaders of the first Kosovo military groups, which were trained in Albania in 1991–1992. Pajaziti became the KLA commander for the Llapi area and his deputy was Hakif Zejnullahu.

Zahiri and his companions launched multiple attacks against Serbian police and perceived collaborators of the regime. He was also aware that in Drenica region, the KLA commanders, led by Adem Jashari and his fighters were active for the same cause. He had illegally crossed the border between then-Serbia and Montenegro and Albania multiple times, in order to prepare the young soldiers of KLA. On January 20, 1997, he returned to Kosovo for the last time from Albania.

== Death ==
Pajaziti suspected that the Serbian Secret Service had likely documented his journeys, and possibly even his actions against the police. On 31 January 1997, the Serbian police successfully tracked the movements of Pajaziti and his two soldiers, Zejnullahu and Edmond Hoxha. Serbian police forces coordinated their actions and strengthened all checkpoints along the Pristina-Vushtrri corridor. Several police vehicles began following the "Lada" car carrying Pajaziti, Zejnullahu, and Hoxha, who were all armed. As they reached the entrance to Pestovë village, the Serbian police, without warning, opened fire on their car. The three men, despite the ambush, managed to return fire but were killed.

== Legacy ==
In the aftermath of their deaths, the General Staff of the Kosovo Liberation Army issued a statement, announcing that one of the liberation war's "most dedicated fighters" had fallen in action. Zahir Pajaziti became a symbol of resistance for Kosovo Albanians, at a time when Kosovo’s pacifist leaders were clouding public opinion, dismissing attacks on Serbian forces as fabrications of the Serbian Secret Service. His death mobilized hundreds of young men and women to join the KLA across Kosovo. In his honor and that of his two companions, a tombstone was erected in their residence in Pestovë. The 153rd Brigade of the Llap Operative Zone of the KLA was named in his honor during the war.

Pajaziti has been commemorated with bronze statues in Podujevë and Pristina. Many streets, squares, schools, and institutions in Kosovo carry his name. His life and actions have inspired numerous studies, songs, and poems.

In 2008, the president of Kosovo, Fatmir Sejdiu, declared Pajaziti a Hero of Kosovo.

== See also ==
- Kosovo Liberation Army
