= Repë =

Repë Repë or Repa (Albanian)
- Village
- Location within Kosovo
- Coordinates: 43°1′53″N 21°7′26.3″E
- Kosovo: Kosovo
- District: Prishtinë
- Municipality: Podujevo

Area
  - Total: 11.79 km^{2} (4.55 sq mi)
- Elevation: 727 m (2,385 ft)

Population (2024)
  - Total: 256
  - Density: 21.7/km^{2} (56.2/sq mi)
- Time zone: UTC+1 (CET)
  - Summer (DST): UTC+2 (CEST)

Repë is a village in the Municipality of Podujeva. It is located in the north of this municipality and near it flows the Llapi River. In the north of Repë, is the village of Pollatë that is considered as the Llapi river source, and in the south is the village of Metehi.
