= District of Pristina =

District in Kosovo

Coordinates: 42.677°N 21.168°E

District of Pristina: Rajoni i Prishtinës (Albanian) Prištinski okrug/ Приштински округ (Serbian)
- District
- Map of Kosovo with Pristina highlighted
- Interactive map of District of Pristina
- Country: Kosovo
- Municipalities: 8: Drenas; Kosovo Polje; Gračanica; Lipjan; Novo Brdo; Obiliq; Podujevë; Pristina
- Capital: Pristina

Area
  - District: 2,439 km^{2} (942 sq mi)

Population (2024)
  - District: 511,307
  - Density: 209.6/km^{2} (543.0/sq mi)
- Time zone: UTC+1 (CET)
  - Summer (DST): UTC+2 (CEST)
- Vehicle registration: 01
- HDI (2023): 0.806 very high · 1st

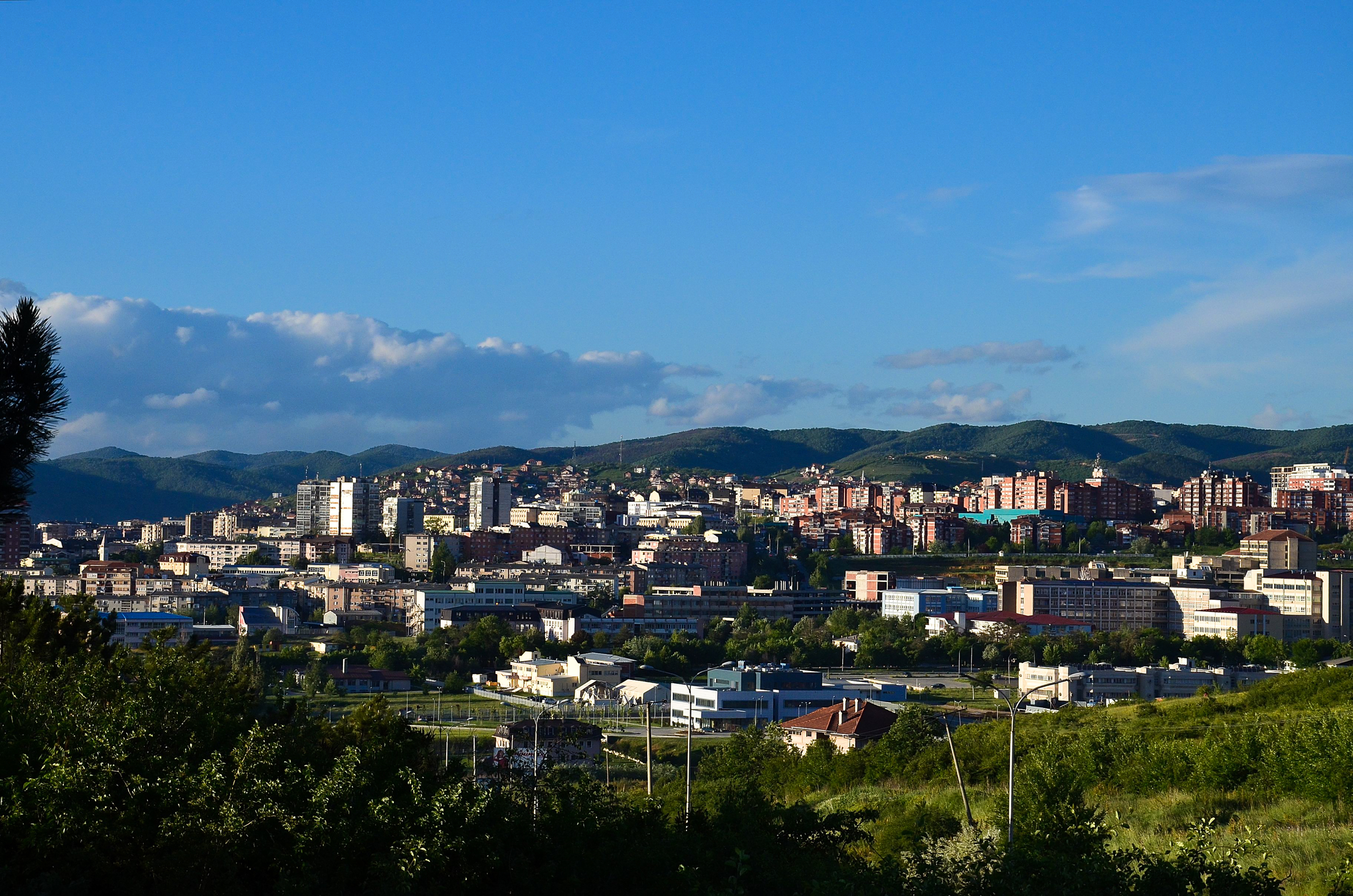
Pristina, Kosovo

The District of Pristina (Albanian: Rajoni i Prishtinës; Serbian: Приштински округ, Prištinski okrug) is a district in Kosovo. Its seat is the capital city of Pristina. It consists of eight municipalities and 298 villages. According to the 2024 census, the total population of the district is 511,307.

== Demography ==
In the 2024 national census by the Kosovo Agency of Statistics (ASK), the district had a population of 511,307, making it the largest of the districts in Kosovo. The district of Pristina has a total of eight municipalities and 298 other smaller settlements:

Municipality	Population (2024)	Area (km2)	Density (km2)	Settlements
Pristina	227,466	572	397.7	41
Podujevë	70,975	632	112.3	76
Drenas	48,079	290	165.8	37
Lipjan	55,044	422	130.4	70
Fushë Kosova	63,949	83	770.5	15
Obiliq	22,815	105	217.3	19
Gračanica	18,486	131	141.1	16
Artana	4,493	204	22.0	24
District of Pristina	511,307	2,439	209.6	298

=== Ethnicity ===
As of 2024, Albanians comprise the overwhelming majority in Pristina (98.0%), Drenas (99.9%), Podujevë (98.7%), Lipjan (94.2%), Kosovo Polje (91.3%), Obiliq (84.3%), and Novo Brdo (84.6%). Gračanica has a mixed population, with Albanians at 46.6% and Serbs at 46.3%.

In 1991, municipalities with an Albanian majority included Pristina (88.63%), Obiliq (80.31%), Kosovo Polje (82.63%), Lipjan (79.36%), Podujevë (98.91%), and Drenas (99.87%), while Novo Brdo had a Serb–Montenegrin majority (58.12%).

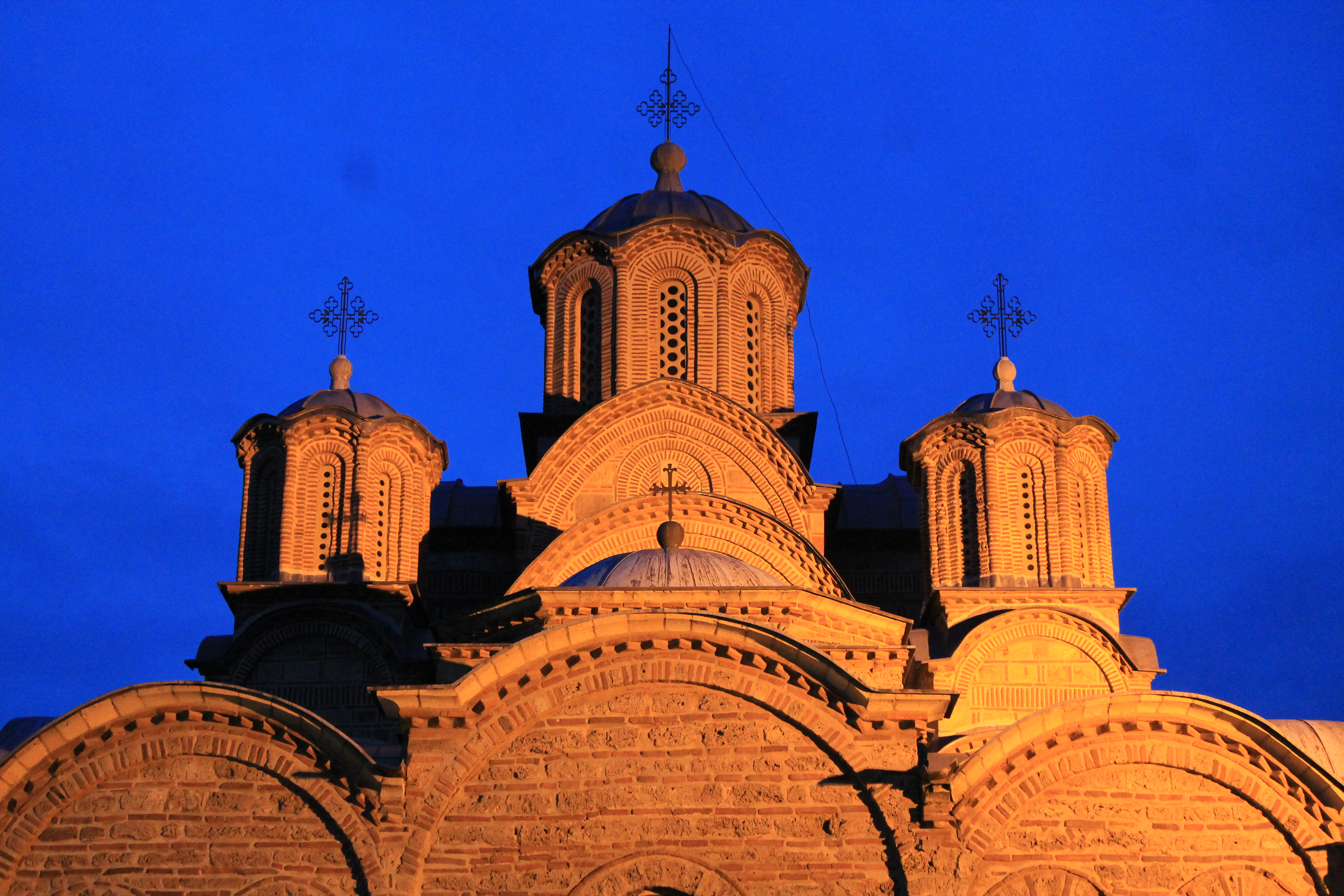
Gračanica Monastery

== Postal codes ==
Municipality	Postal code
Prishtina	10000
Graçanica	10500
Podujevë	11000
Fushë Kosovë	12000
Drenas	13000
Lipjan	14000
Obiliq	15000
Artanë	16000

== See also ==
- Subdivisions of Kosovo
