= Trepça Mines =

Mine in Kosovo

Trepca Mines
- Interactive map of Trepca Mines
- Location: Mitrovica, Kosovo; 42°56′21″N 20°55′05″E
- Products: Lead; Silver; Zinc; Gold; Ore
- Opened: 1920
- Active: 1925–present
- Company: Government of Kosovo

The Trepça Mines (Albanian: Miniera e Trepçës, Serbian: Рудник Трепча, romanized: Rudnik Trepča) is a large industrial complex in Kosovo, located 9 km (5.6 mi) northeast of Mitrovica. The mine is located on the southern slopes of the Kopaonik mountain, between the peaks of Crni Vrh (1,364 m (4,475 ft)) and Majdan 1,268 m (4,160 ft), and it is Europe's largest lead-zinc and silver ore mine.

With up to 23,000 employees, Trepça was once one of the biggest companies in Yugoslavia. In the 1930s, the Selection Trust gained the rights to exploit the Stari Trg mine close to Mitrovica. After World War II, under socialist self-management of Yugoslavia, the company further expanded.

== Overview ==
The enterprise known as Trepça was a conglomerate of 40 mines and factories, located mostly in Kosovo but also in locations in Montenegro. But the heart of its operations, and the source of most of its raw material, is the vast mining complex to the east of Mitrovica in the north of Kosovo, famous since Roman times.

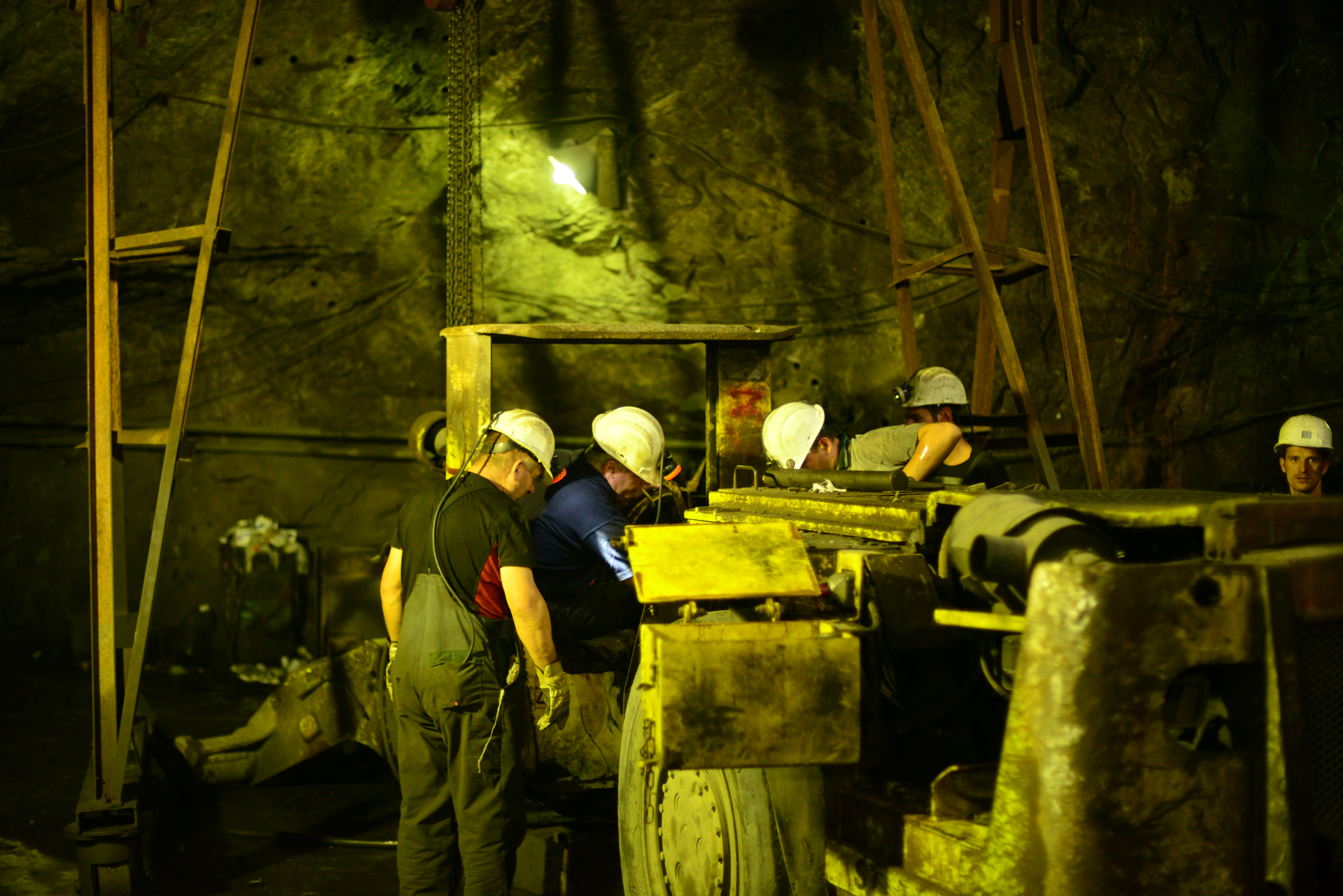
Inside The Trepça Mine

However, with the closure of several mines and factories in the late 1980s and 1990s, the Trepça mining complex in Kosovo now comprises only seven lead and zinc mines, three concentrators, one smelter, and one zinc plant. Mines are categorized according to their geographic location:

- Northern Chain: Belo Brdo mine, Crnac mine and Žuta Prlina
- Middle Chain: Stari Trg mine
- Southern Chain: Hajvalia mine, Novo Brdo mine and Kišnica mine

This is all that remains of the huge complex that during the 1980s employed 20,000 workers, and accounted for 70% of all Yugoslavia's mineral wealth.

The mines still have a reserve of 60.5 million tonnes of ore grading 4.96% lead, 3.3% zinc and 74.4 gr/tonne silver, which translates as three million tonnes of lead, two million tonnes of zinc and 4,500 tonnes of silver.

== History ==
=== Middle Ages ===
==== Origin ====
Stari Trg is one of the rare mines which was operational from the Roman period. Many constructions back in the Roman Empire were constructed including fortresses, wells, drosses, etc. The main fortress was built for the Roman city Municipium Dardanorum which was the capital city of a Roman province in Dardani. With the collapse of the Roman Empire and Slavic migrations, mining activity decreased leading to closure until the late Medieval Era (1000–1492). The long history of the successive influxes of the Byzantine, Bulgarian, Serbian, Albanian and Turkish people helps explain the cultural mixing and the legacies of old grievances which underlie the chaos of the 1990s.

==== Full development ====
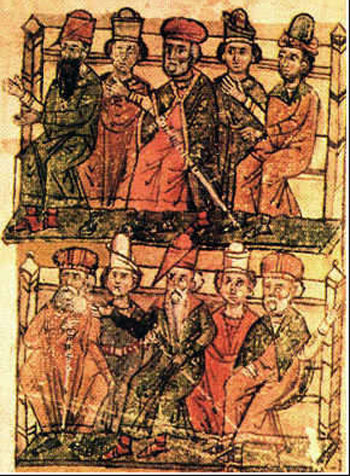
Miniature in the 16th-century copy of the Mining Law of Stefan Lazarević made for Novo Brdo in 1412.

During his reign (1243–76), King Uroš invited the Saxon miners to Serbia, in order to develop the state's mines. The Saxons (called Sasi by the Serbs) built settlements and churches around the mines and were granted with keeping their identity. Trepča mine probably originated in the second half of the 13th century, as it was mentioned for the first time in 1303 in one charter of the Pope Boniface VIII. As Stari Trg was one of the Europe's richest mines of lead, zinc, silver and gold, King Milutin set a coin mint there, which was operational for over a century. Emperor Dušan appointed a special knez to administer Trepča. The mine reached its pinnacle during the reign of Dušan's successor, Emperor Uroš. On 11 March 1363, Uroš awarded Vuk Branković with the title of "ruler of Drenica, Kosovo and Trepča". Trepča was governed by Branković until 1396 when he was captured by the Ottomans. Also known as a major trading town, Trepča had representatives from the rich, trading cities, like Split and Kotor on the Adriatic, while trading city of Dubrovnik appointed a consul. As with the others mines in the Medieval Serbia (Brskovo, Rudnik, Janjevo, Novo Brdo), a square town developed around Trepča.

The mining activity answered the needs of the successive lords and their suzerains, for it financed military activities, such as the construction of fortresses along the Ibar valley for protection against the Ottoman threats. On 15 June 1389, a dozen kilometers south from Trepča, the famous Battle of Kosovo occurred. In 1390/91 Serbia became an Ottoman vassal, but the mine continued to function normally. In 1455 the Ottomans, under the Sultan Mehmed the Conqueror, captured Trepča.

=== Ottoman Register of the 16th century ===
Several neighborhoods in the area of Trepča according to the Ottoman defter of 1591 were Islamised and the other neighborhoods contained people with a mixture of Christian, Albanian and Slavic names. According to Selami Pulaha, Trepča in the 16th century had a significant Albanian population. 13 heads of families in the neighborhood of Trepz and 22 heads of families in the neighborhood Mekisha bore typical Albanian names.

==== Downfall ====
Under the Ottoman rule, Trepča, and all the other mines (like Novo Brdo) began to depopulate and deteriorate. During the Austro-Turkish War from 1683 to 1699, the town of Trepča and its mine were destroyed in 1685. Followed by the massive depopulation as a result of the 1690 Great Migration of the Serbs, the mining activity ceased completely.

=== 20th-century revival ===
==== Selection Trust ====
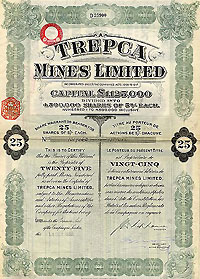
The contract formed between the British Selection Trust and the Trepča mines

After World War I ended, the newly formed Kingdom of the Serbs, Croats and Slovenes (future Yugoslavia), instigated the geological surveys of the medieval ore mines in order to ease the payments of the war credits. Prime minister Nikola Pašić, who became the concessionary of the Stari Trg ore deposits, hired Fran Tućan to do the explorations. Tućan reported about the massive ore findings.

In 1925 a big exploration program was carried out by the British company, Selection Trust, which assessed the huge potential of the ore deposit and acquired the concession in 1926. The concession was obtained by Sir Alfred Chester Beatty, American-born British industrialist who founded the Selection Trust, nicknamed "King of copper", from Rade Pašić, son of Nikola Pašić. Beatty became the first owner and a head of the modern Trepča mines. On 9 September 1927 he launched the Trepča Mines Limited subsidiary in London and the mines were operational under that name until the end of World War II, so the founding act of the later company said: "Founded on 9 December 1927, Broad and son, 1 Great Winchester Street, London ECZ".

Exploitation of the ore began in 1930 ("First tunnel" in Stari Trg). On 14 August 1930, the flotation in Zvečan (Stan Trg), was opened in the same place as the ancient medieval pit. The name Stan Trg is a misprint by the British administration of the mine, derived from the toponym Stari Trg which in Serbian means old place, or old market. Amazingly, the obvious misprint was not corrected in any later document nor mine plan. The flotation in Zvečan was operational until 31 March 1941. In that period it processed 6 million tons of ore. The ore was transported to the floatation first on the bullock carts, until a 6.5 km (4.0 mi) long industrial cable car transportation was built. A lead smeltery and refinery became operational in Zvečan in 1939.

During the German occupation of Yugoslavia in World War II, Stari Trg, the centerpiece mine, supplied 40 percent of lead used in the Nazi war industry. After the German-lead Invasion of Yugoslavia in April 1941, most of what is today Kosovo was annexed to the Kingdom of Italy but the area around Trepča was part of the German-installed Serbian state. The mines were under the direct German administration, allowing the continued flow of minerals for the production of ammunition and submarine batteries. Output of these products was continued in the period after 1945, in the new, Communist Yugoslavia.

==== Post-WW2 expansion ====
Since 1939 the complex was expanded and reconstructed on several occasions. After the World War II, Tito's SFR Yugoslavia nationalized the enterprise. Marking the 40th anniversary, on 9 December 1967 a new lead smelter was opened (at the time, the 4th largest in the world), so as the zinc electrolysis plant and an automotive battery plant. New flotation in Zvečan was built in 1985, in the First tunnel, closer to Stari Trg. The landmark of the Zvečan complex is a 303-metre-high (994 ft) industrial chimney.

From 1930 to 1985, 131 million tons of lead and zinc ore was processed. Until the production ceased in 2000, historical total output included: 3,3 million tons of refined lead, 4,100 tons of refined silver and 3,300 tons of bismuth. Calculated in 2017 parity, production of the complex was $360 million in 1975 and $340 million in 1987.

In 1985, Trepča was Europe's 1st and world's 5th largest raw lead smelting facility and one of the largest for processing zinc. Production capacity included: 3.5 million tons of ore, 165,000 tons of raw lead, 110,000 tons of refined lead, 40,000 tons of electrolytic zinc, 100 tons of fine silver, 100 tons of refined bismuth, 72 tons of cadmium, 200 kg of gold, 20,000 tons of lead batteries, 280,000 tons of sulfuric acid, 100,000 tons of sulfur-phosphate and 150,000 tons of composite fertilizers. It produced over 80% of refined lead and over 50% of refined zinc in Yugoslavia.

==== The 1989 miners' strike ====
The 1989 Kosovo miners' strike was a hunger strike initiated by some workers of the Trepča Mines on 20 February 1989 against the abolition of the autonomy of the Province of Kosovo by the Socialist Republic of Serbia. The strike quickly gained support in Slovenia and Croatia, while in Belgrade protests were held against the Slovenian, Albanian and Croatian demands for decentralization. The strike council articulated ten requirements, which included obeying the 1974 constitution, stopping the alleged chauvinist and hegemonistic politics of the time, amnesty for the strike leaders, etc. The strike lasted eight days, being known as the longest underground strike to have been held. It eventually ended after the hospitalization of 180 miners and the resignation of the heads of the pro-Milošević leaders Rahman Morina, Ali Šukrija and Husamedin Azemi.

==== Collapse ====
This complex progressively collapsed during the last fifteen years, for reasons such as outdated installations; neglect and lack of maintenance, repair, and reinvestment; absence of control over production; robbery of equipment and workshops, and "Milosevic apparatchik" mine manager Novak Bjelic. Privatization attempts remained without great follow-up. The downgrade increased from 1990 with the reduction of Kosovo's autonomy by Belgrade, the increasing ethno-political tension and the resignation of most Albanian workers.

At the time, an estimated 25,000 tons per year of sulphur dioxide pollution were discharged by the smokestack, and lead levels in the air rose to more than 100 times the acceptable levels in the EU.

On 18 September 1999, the mineralogical museum of the mine, where guarded treasures had been accumulated since 1966, was plundered by thieves benefiting from the confusion. It was reported that the most invaluable vivianite specimen of the museum, more than 1,500 of the crystals collected inside the mine since 1927, and 150 specimens which had been given by 30 countries from all over the world had disappeared.

UNMIK inherited a large problem through its trusteeship of the assets, and in February 2002, Bjelic suffered from criminal court proceedings brought by the UNMIK-installed management board.

=== Kosovo War and after ===
==== Shutting down ====
The arrival of KFOR in June 1999 led to an outburst of the mining complex. The northern mines remained owned and operated by Serbs, while the southern mines were in Albanian hands. After the forces of FR Yugoslavia withdrew from Kosovo in 1999, the chaos ensued in the period during the takeover by KFOR and UNMIK, a military and a civilian administration, respectively. The units of UÇK looted and destroyed much of the mine's properties while international forces did nothing to stop it. UNMIK was authorized to take over all the state owned companies. However, Trepča wasn't organized as a plain, state-owned property, but was transformed into the joint-stock company in 1996. UNMIK chief Bernard Kouchner personally asked for the documentation on the ownership of Trepča, but he wasn't authorized to take over the stock company, which French newspaper Le Monde wrote about at the time. Serbian management of the company tried to continue the production in the facilities north of the Ibar river which remained out of Albanian control, as much as it was possible: 9 mines out of 14, 6 out of 8 flotation units, 1 out of 2 metallurgy factories and 9 out of 17 factories or 70% of the capacities. As Kouchner had administrative rule over the electric company, he ordered the shutting down of the power supply to the mine. An alternative power line, which connected the mine with the grid in the Central Serbia was then established. The mine was supplied with water via the 30 km (19 mi) long concrete canal from the Gazivode Lake. Claiming that two Albanian children fell into the canal, Kouchner order for the water to be cut, too. The company then organized alternative water supply system which consisted of powerful water pumps which pumped the water from the Ibar river via the two-way pipeline into the pools on the slopes of the Zvečan Hill. From there, using free fall, the water was conducted to the factories. The official seat of the company was transferred to Belgrade, but the management remained in Zvečan.

Chief of the US section of the KFOR, General William L. Nash tried to shut it down, too, giving statements that 700 bodies of dead Albanians were suspected to be in the First Tunnel or that bodies were incinerated in the manhole furnace. After several months of investigation, French, German, Dutch and American investigators concluded that the furnace in question wasn't operational when the alleged crime happened. General Nash then claimed that Trepča needs to be closed because of the environmental pollution, though French minister for environment, Dominique Voynet concluded that there is no danger for the surroundings. Expecting military takeover, the management "fortified" the complex with goods wagons, locomotives and slag, while it was lit with powerful reflector lights, looking like a "space ship". On early 14 August 2000, at 3:45, 3,000 mostly US soldiers stormed the premises, using tanks, amphibians and helicopters. French soldiers, using battering ram, broke into the central administrative building. Soldiers arrested the CEO, Novak Bjelić, who was 3 hours later expelled into central Serbia on the orders of Kouchner. Kouchner ordered the shut down of Trepča.

On 4 January 2001, Serbian deputy prime minister Nebojša Čović signed a document which returned the seat of the company to Zvečan and changes the structure of Trepča, transforming it back to the state owned company, which effectively retroactively legalized the military occupation of the complex.

As of 2017, the only remaining operational part of the complex were the Kopaonik mines and the flotation in Leposavić.

==== Privatisation ====
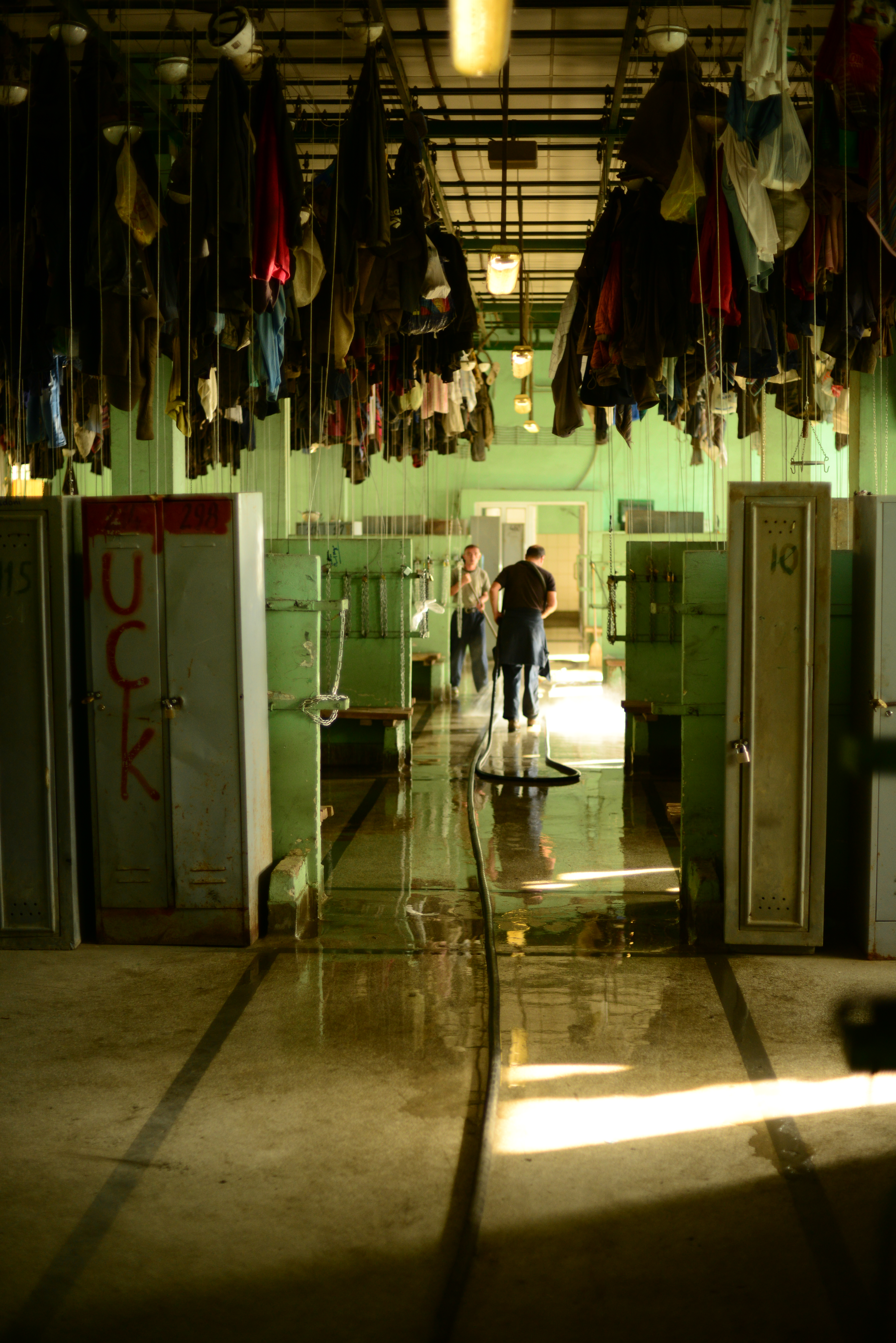
"Dry" facility at the surface of the Trepča Mine

The Trepča mining complex is derelict in a failing state that has immense potential, but has so far been ignored by serious investors for myriad reasons. The mine effectively went out of production as a result of the 1999 civil war and has been rumored to be part of the reason for the conflict in the first place.

Its economy is in dire straits and there are few options to improve it. Trepča, despite its problems, provides one of the few significant development opportunities. The facility needs major upgrades, but the mineral reserves are great enough to offset the start-up costs. Most importantly, a reactivated Trepča would provide several thousand jobs and increase Kosovo's foreign exchange.

It is estimated that the necessary improvements would cost between 15 and 30 million US dollars. This would be justifiable if full scale mining were to return as a 2001 UNMIK report said that “29,000,000 tonnes of mine-run ore at grades varying from 3.40 to 3.45% Pb, 2.23 to 2.36% Zn and 74 to 81 grams/tonne Ag, i.e., around 999,000 tonnes Pb, 670,000 tonnes Zn and 2,200 tonnes Ag” are available. To make use of Trepča, foreign investment is required. Since financial means to upgrade the mines’ facilities themselves are absent, and there is not enough foreign aid still reaching Kosovo to make a difference, the complex still will not be used at its highest level.

The concern that letting in foreign investors will give away their promising source of natural resources since the complex is considered a treasure for the nation needs to be appeased in order for its privatization to happen sooner. In the following years, certain legislation like a new mining law and regulations for investment incentives, will support privatization efforts if approved in order for the complex to work and be used at its highest level.

==== 2015 nationalization attempt ====
In January 2015, the government of Kosovo said it would nationalise the Trepča mining complex because the Privatization Agency of Kosovo (KPA) had failed to come up with a plan for the mine's future. Partly due to its murky ownership structure and numerous creditor claims with a draft law, but fearing bankruptcy and liquidation then the government changed this decision, then approved a special draft law except which includes two new articles those for completion changes according to which certain social enterprise could become public by decision of the Assembly. At the request of the Government of the Republic of Kosovo, the Assembly provided two new articles, by which the status of Trepca will be regulated by a special law of Strategy and, while companies that have entered the process of reorganization, bankruptcy or liquidation, terminated with the entry into force of this law without the need for any judicial decision. Albanian employees declared a strike and would not emerge from underground until the parliament adopts the law on public enterprises. They ended their strike when Kosovo government officials said they would consider bringing up nationalization again.

In October 2016, the nationalisation process went ahead over Serbian diplomatic protest. The mine "had been held in trust and readied for sale" since 1999 by the UN-protected Kosovo Privatization Agency. The "legislation makes the government the guarantor of the company’s debt."

As of March 2019, the Serbian managers of RMHK Trepca were still fighting a rearguard action against the nationalization.

=== Strikes ===
On 24 October 2023, miners at the Trepča mining complex began a strike to protest worsening working conditions and alleged inaction by management. Around 200 workers participated, with some also engaging in a hunger strike. Union leader Ibrahim Jonuzi noted that participation in the hunger strike was voluntary. The workers' demands included timely salary payments, improved working conditions, and the removal of current management. Trepča's management declared the strike illegal, citing a lack of the required seven-day advance notice. The union accused management of suspending five union members for initiating the strike, which they perceived as a threat. Kosovo’s Economy Ministry called for the miners to resume work and highlighted recent improvements, including a 17% wage increase, a 23% rise in overtime pay, and nearly doubled food allowances in 2023. As of November 2023, miners at Trepča earned monthly salaries ranging from $740 to $950, above Kosovo’s average of $700. The strike ended on 3 November after the miners, MPs from the ruling Vetevendosje party and the Ministry of Economy reached a deal.

In July 2024, workers at the complex went on strike over months of unpaid wages.

== Economic impact ==
The impact on town of Mitrovica was a major one. In only one census period of 10 years, from 1961 to 1971, the town grew by 57,7% (26,721 to 42,126).

Kosovo has not yet fully recovered from the 1998–99 war and has failed since declaring independence in 2008 to build a stable economy. The Trepča mine complex has not recovered from its lost production during the war. Trepča once accounted for 70 percent of Kosovo's gross domestic product, but since the war ended in 1999, the partition of Mitrovica between Kosovar Albanians and Serbs loyal to Belgrade keeps most of Trepča's facilities closed. According to various statistics, the complex can not be reopened without at least $650 million of foreign investment to repair and update the smelters and refineries.

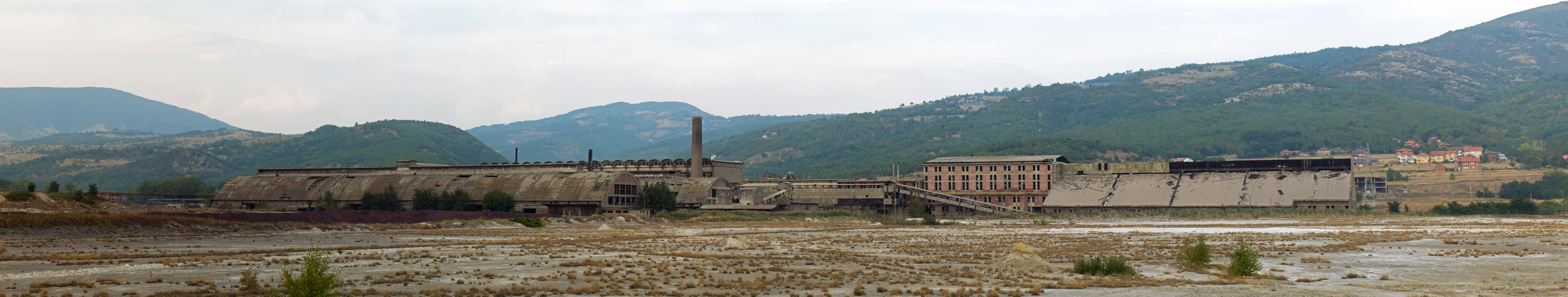
Fabric and accumulators of Trepča mine in Mitrovica (2012). In the foreground is contaminated ground of former activities.

== Geology ==
Geologically, the Trepča area belongs to the Mississippi Valley-Type of mineral deposits. It has beautiful occurrence of skarn, so as the Novo Brdo mine.

Trepča was the largest Galena and Sphalerite mine in Yugoslavia.

More than sixty minerals are listed up to date, most of which from a museological viewpoint are of exceptional quality.

They include:

- Actinolite
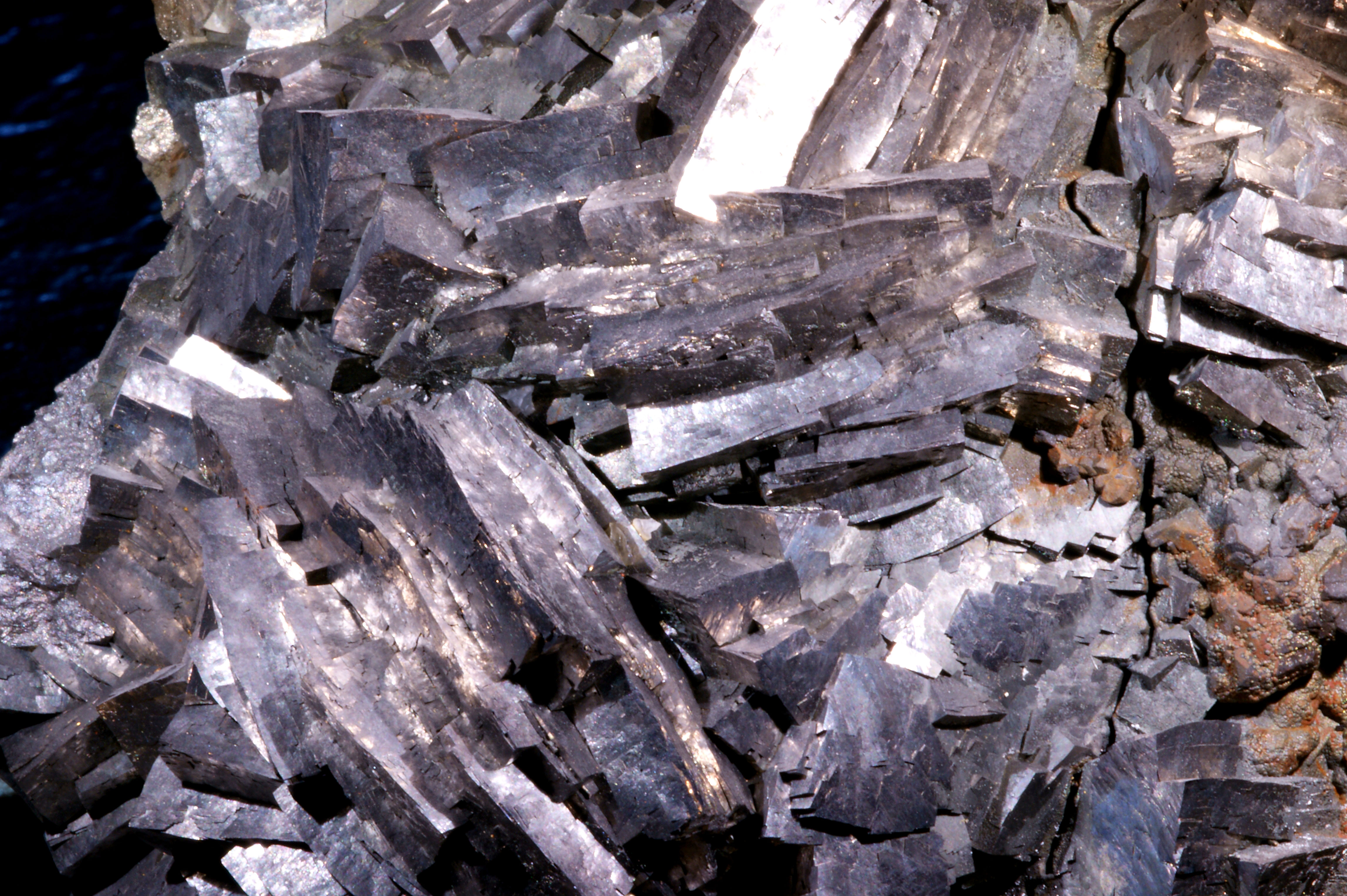
  Arsenopyrite in Trepča
- Anglesite
- Ankerite
- Aragonite
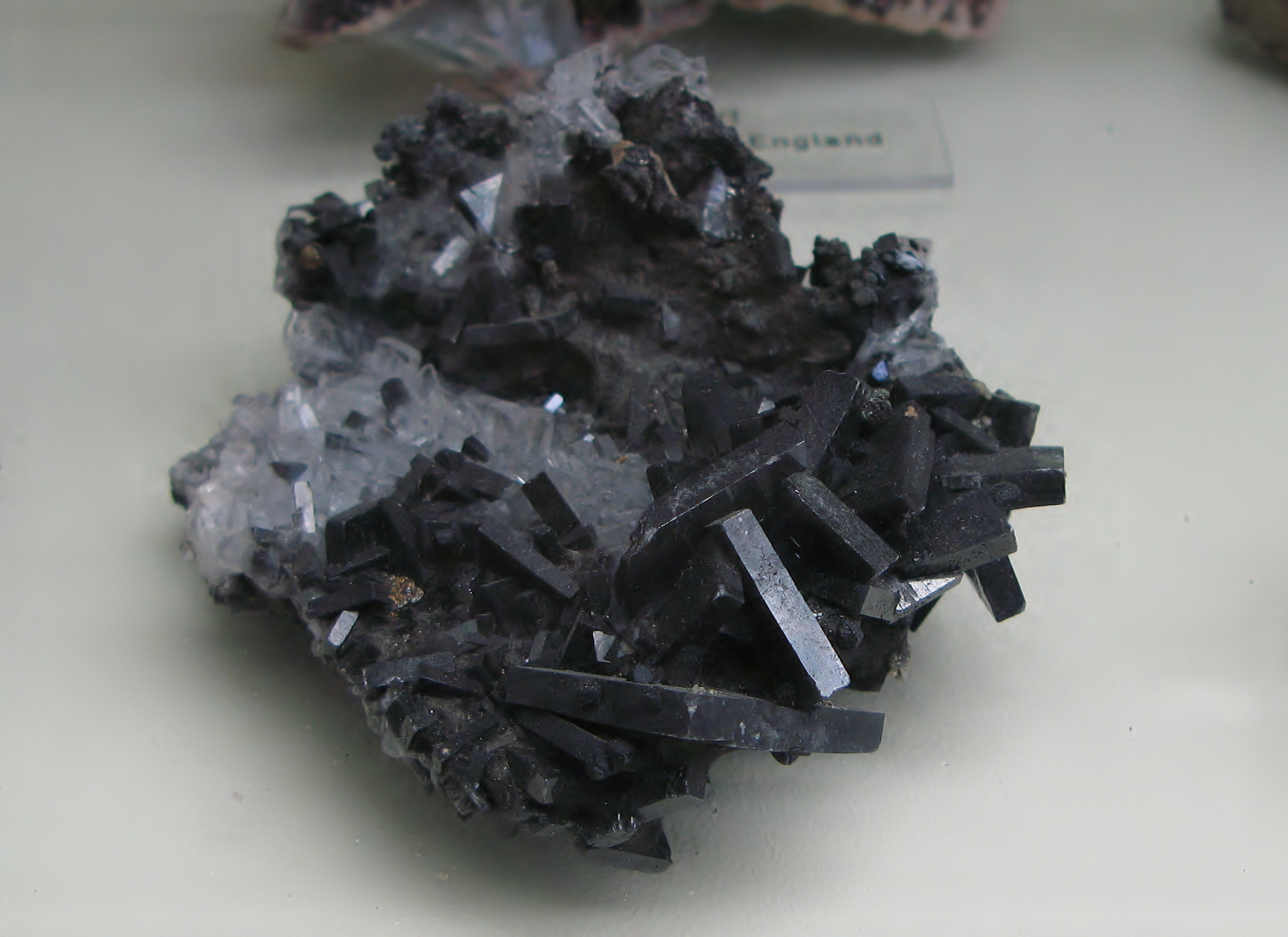
  Barite – Trepča
- Arsenopyrite
- Barite
- Bismuth
- Bornite
- Boulangerite
- Bournonite
- Calcite
- Chalcanthite
- Chalcedony
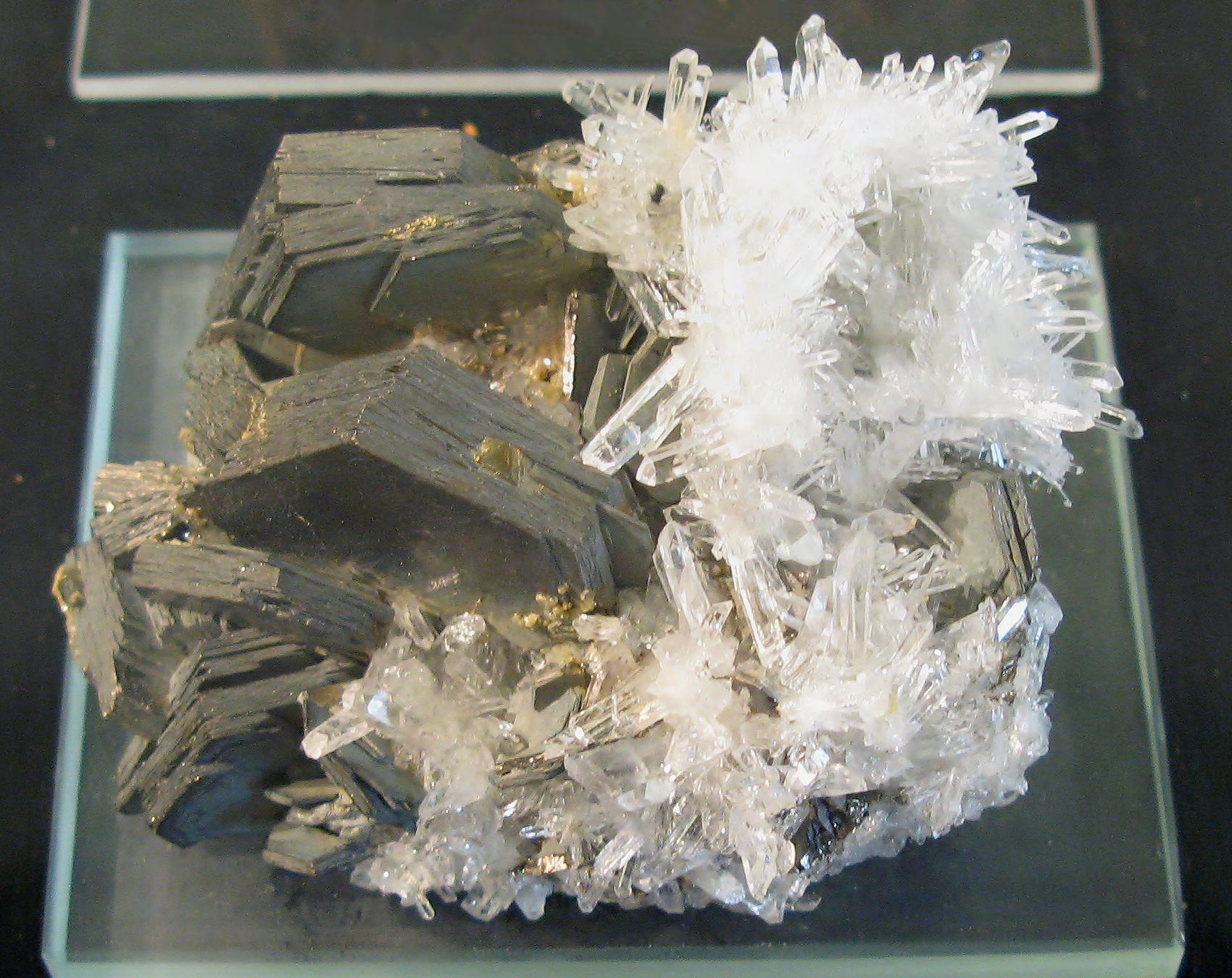
  Pyrrhotinte – Trepča
- Chalcopyrite
- Childrenite
- Chlorite
- Covellite
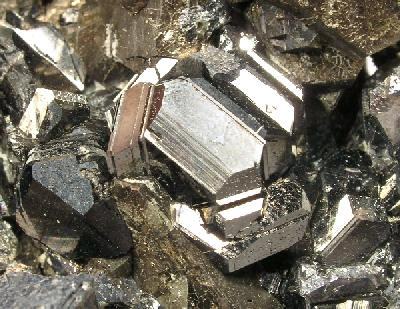
  Galena and Pyrrhotite- Trepča
- Cubanite
- Diopside
- Dolomite
- Enargite
- Epidote
- Galena
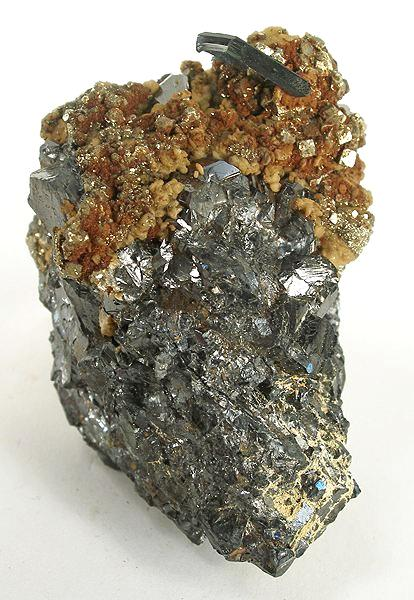
  Vivianite, Siderite and Pyrite- Trepča
- Garnets
- Gypsum
- Hedenbergite
- Hematite
- Illite
- Indium
- Jamesonite
- Limonite
- Löllingite
- Ludlamite
- Magnetite
- Marcasite
- Melanterite
- Native gold
- Psilomelane
- Pyrargyrite
- Pyrite
- Pyrrhotite
- Quartz
- Rhodochrosite
- Scheelite
- Siderite
- Smithsonite
- Sphalerite
- Stannite
- Stibnite
- Struvite
- Tennantite
- Tetrahedrite
- Thallium
- Valleriite
- Vivianite
- Wollastonite

The amount of ore mining in Kosovo is continuously in decline, as represented here:

	Stari Trg	Kišnica & Novo Brdo	Northern Chain	Ore	Lead (%)	Zinc (%)
1975	636,700	717,398	353,226	1,707,324	4.57%	4.43%
1976	658,355	734,706	359,656	1,752,717	4.30%	4.39%
1977	671,758	821,322	374,591	1,867,671	4.32%	4.18%
1978	603,187	796,003	359,052	1,758,242	4.27%	4.08%
1979	674,801	786,654	362,586	1,824,041	4.23%	3.82%
1980	668,418	882,605	376,031	1,927,054	3.82%	3.54%
1981	696,216	840,508	383,285	1,920,009	3.77%	3.18%
1982	628,037	852,979	402,606	1,883,622	3.49%	3.24%
1983	672,262	710,797	354,907	1,737,966	3.58%	3.29%
1984	702,724	718,708	371,089	1,792,521	3.36%	2.95%
1985	687,558	582,002	340,388	1,609,948	3.45%	3.02%
1986	647,078	523,351	297,409	1,467,838	3.51%	3.03%
1987	636,935	527,930	267,281	1,432,146	3.73%	3.00%
1988	571,618	442,664	264,857	1,279,139	3.51%	3.26%
1989	368,573	413,244	237,028	1,018,845	3.54%	3.33%
1990	204,570	298,143	217,755	720,468	3.03%	3.16%
1991	206,489	177,553	105,322	489,364	3.84%	4.14%
1992	134,946	62,449	90,020	287,415	4.15%	3.79%
1993	48,612	22,953	26,437	98,002	4.04%	4.39%
1994	32,475	26,125	13,663	72,263	3.24%	3.89%
1995	125,761	47,566	86,448	259,775	4.02%	4.35%
1996	181,809	102,641	111,225	395,675	4.39%	5.25%
1997	257,888	117,201	138,881	513,970	3.27%	4.97%
1998	311,315	143,178	178,365	632,858	3.00%	2.97%
1999	87,296	49,490	105,640	242,426	2.60%	1.72%
2000	0	0	28,321	28,321	6.92%	3.43%
