= Trepca =

Trepca (Serbian: Трепча / Trepča, Albanian: Trepça) may refer to:

- Trepça Mines, an industrial complex in Mitrovica, Kosovo
- KB Trepça, a basketball club in Mitrovica founded in 1947
- KF Trepça, a football club in Mitrovica founded in 1932
- KH Trepça, a handball club in Mitrovica founded in 1950
- KF Trepça'89, a football club in Mitrovica founded in 1940/1989
- FK Trepča, a football club in North Mitrovica founded in 1932/1989
- Trepča, Montenegro, a village in Montenegro
- Trepça, Melan, a village in Albania
