= Vivianite =

Fe(II) phosphate mineral

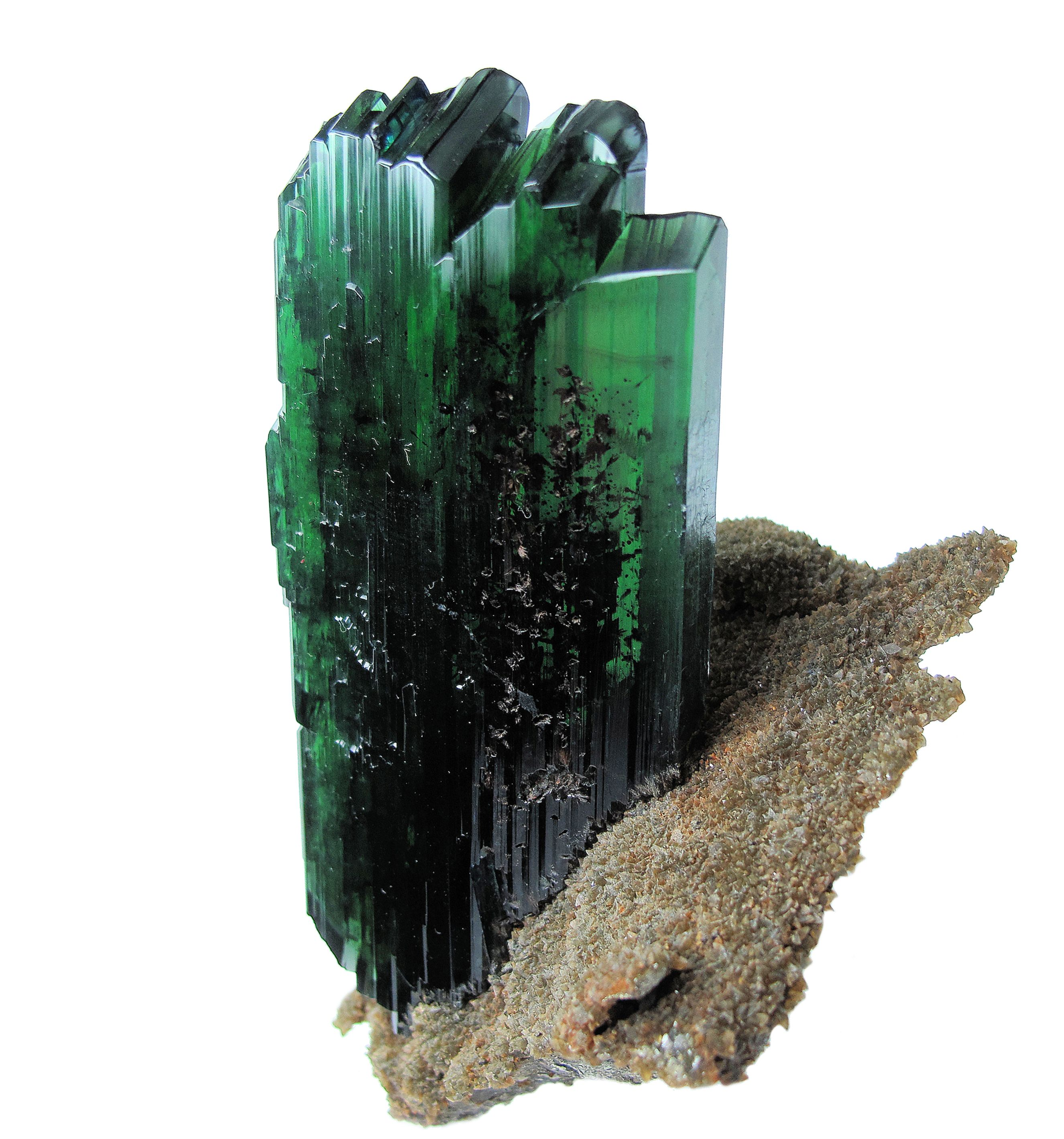
- Vivianite tabular crystal, transparent, with a deep green color. Crystal size: 82 mm × 38 mm × 11 mm. From Huanuni mine, Dalence Province, Oruro Department, Bolivia

General
- Category: Phosphate mineral Vivianite group
- Formula: Fe^{2+}_{3}(PO_{4})_{2}·8H_{2}O
- IMA symbol: Viv
- Strunz classification: 8.CE.40 (10 ed); 7/C.13-40 (8 ed)
- Dana classification: 40.3.6.1
- Crystal system: Monoclinic
- Crystal class: Prismatic (2/m) (same H-M symbol)
- Space group: C2/m
- Unit cell: a = 10.086 Å, b = 13.441 Å c = 4.703 Å; β = 104.27°; Z = 2

Identification
- Formula mass: 501.61 g/mol
- Color: Colorless, very pale green, becoming dark blue, dark greenish blue, indigo-blue, then black with oxidation
- Crystal habit: Flattened, elongated prismatic crystals, may be rounded or corroded; as stellate groups, incrustations, concretionary, earthy or powdery
- Twinning: Translation gliding
- Cleavage: Perfect on {010}
- Fracture: Fibrous
- Tenacity: Flexible, sectile
- Mohs scale hardness: 1.5–2
- Luster: Vitreous, pearly on the cleavage, dull when earthy
- Streak: White, altering to dark blue, brown
- Diaphaneity: Transparent to translucent
- Specific gravity: 2.68
- Optical properties: Biaxial (+); moderate relief
- Refractive index: n_{α} = 1.579–1.616, n_{β} = 1.602–1.656, n_{γ} = 1.629–1.675
- Birefringence: δ = 0.050–0.059
- Pleochroism: Visible; X = blue, deep blue, Indigo-blue; Y = pale yellowish green, pale bluish green, yellow-green; Z = pale yellowish green, olive-yellow
- 2V angle: Measured: 63° to 83.5°, Calculated: 78° to 88°
- Dispersion: r < v, weak
- Ultraviolet fluorescence: Not fluorescent
- Melting point: 1,114 °C (2,037 °F)
- Solubility: Easily soluble in acids
- Alters to: Metavivianite

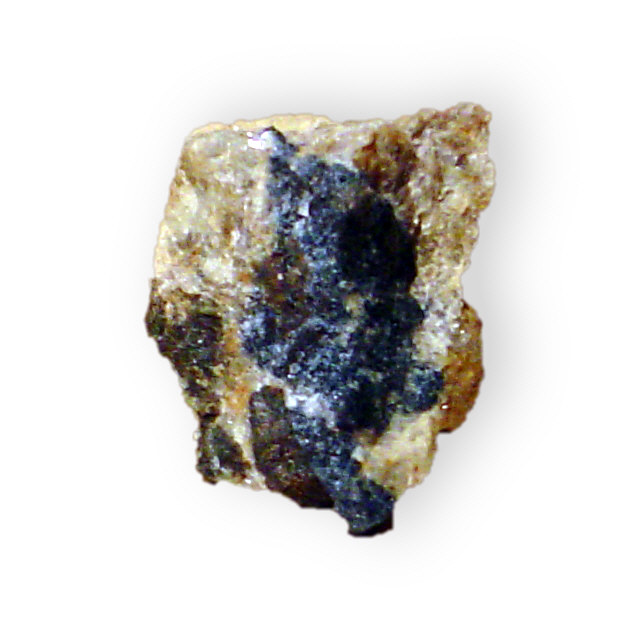
Vivianite from South Dakota, US

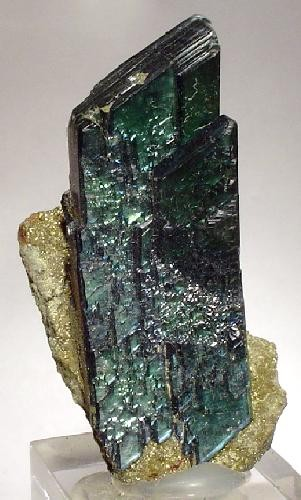
Vivianite and childrenite from the Siglo XX mine (tin mine in Bolivia)

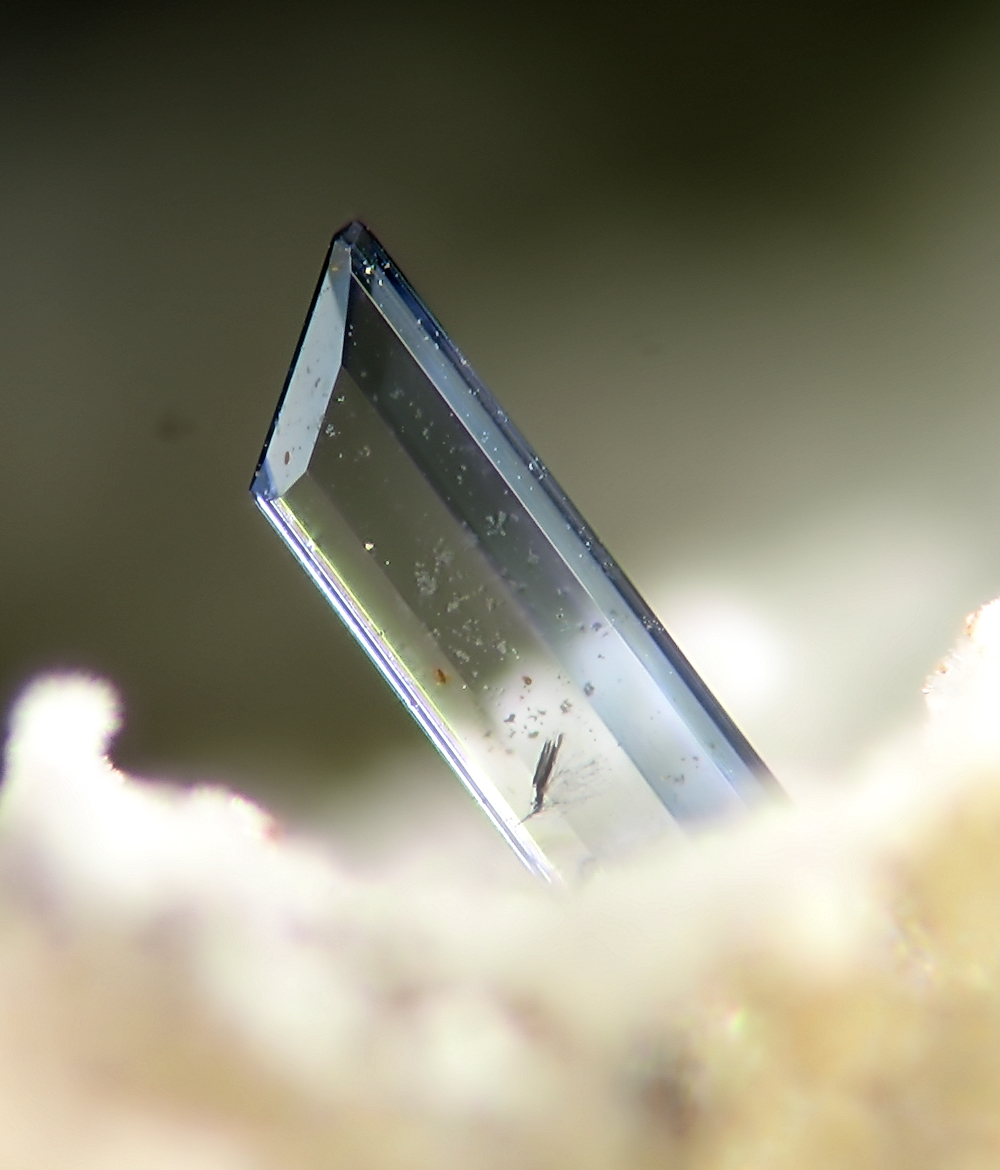
Vivianite from Bavaria (Germany)

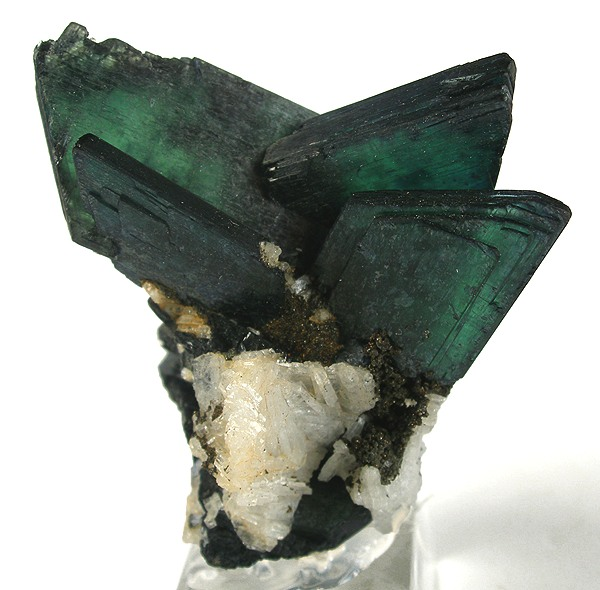
Vivianite and albite from Brazil

Vivianite (Fe^{(II)}_{3}(PO_{4})_{2}·8H_{2}O) is a hydrated iron(II) phosphate mineral found in a number of geological environments. Small amounts of manganese Mn^{2+}, magnesium Mg^{2+}, and calcium Ca^{2+} may substitute for iron Fe^{2+} in its structure. Pure vivianite is colorless, but the mineral oxidizes very easily, changing the color, and it is usually found as deep blue to deep bluish green prismatic to flattened crystals. Vivianite crystals are often found inside fossil shells, such as those of bivalves and gastropods, or attached to fossil bone. Vivianite can also appear on the iron coffins or on the corpses of humans as a result of a chemical reaction of the decomposing body with the iron enclosure.

It was named by Abraham Gottlob Werner, the "father of German geology", in 1817, the year of his death, after either John Henry Vivian (1785–1855), a Welsh-Cornish politician, mine owner and mineralogist living in Truro, Cornwall, England, or after Jeffrey G. Vivian, an English mineralogist. Vivianite was discovered at Wheal Kitty in St Agnes, Cornwall.

== Vivianite group ==
Vivianite group minerals have the general formula A_{3}(XO_{4})_{2}·8H_{2}O, where A is a divalent metal cation and X is either phosphorus or arsenic, and they are monoclinic.

Group members are:

Mineral	Chemical formula	Crystal system
Annabergite	Ni_{3}(AsO_{4})_{2}·8H_{2}O	Monoclinic
Arupite	Ni_{3}(PO_{4})_{2}·8H_{2}O	Monoclinic
Baricite	(Mg^{2+},Fe^{2+})_{3}(PO_{4})_{2}·8H_{2}O	Monoclinic
Erythrite	Co_{3}(AsO_{4})_{2}·8H_{2}O	Monoclinic
Hörnesite	Mg_{3}(AsO_{4})_{2}·8H_{2}O	Monoclinic
Köttigite	Zn_{3}(AsO_{4})_{2}·8H_{2}O	Monoclinic
Manganohörnesite	(Mn^{2+},Mg)_{3}(AsO_{4})_{2}·8H_{2}O	Monoclinic
Pakhomovskyite	Co_{3}(PO_{4})_{2}·8H_{2}O	Monoclinic
Parasymplesite	Fe^{2+}_{3}(AsO_{4})_{2}·8H_{2}O	Monoclinic
Vivianite	Fe^{2+}_{3}(PO_{4})_{2}·8H_{2}O	Monoclinic

Related:
– Bobierrite: Mg_{3}(PO_{4})_{2}·8H_{2}O
– Symplesite: Fe^{2+}_{3}(AsO_{4})_{2}·8H_{2}O
– Metaköttigite: Zn_{3}(AsO_{4})_{2}·8H_{2}O
– Metavivianite: (Fe^{2+}_{3−x},Fe^{3+}_{x})(PO_{4})_{2}(OH)_{x}·(8-x)H_{2}O.
Note: Metavivianite, that vivianite readily alters to, is not a member of the vivianite group because it contains trivalent Fe^{3+} cations.

== Structure ==
In pure end member vivianite all the iron is divalent, Fe^{2+}, but there are two distinct sites in the structure that these ions can occupy. In the first site, the Fe^{2+} is surrounded by four water molecules and two oxygens, making an octahedral group. In the second site, the Fe^{2+} is surrounded by two water molecules and four oxygens, again making an octahedral group. The oxygens are part of the phosphate groups (PO_{4}^{3−}), that are tetrahedral. The vivianite structure has chains of these octahedra and tetrahedra that form sheets perpendicular to the a-crystal axis. The sheets are held together by weak bonds, and that accounts for the perfect cleavage between them.

The crystals are monoclinic, class 2/m, space group C 2/m, with two formula units per unit cell (Z = 2). The approximate values of the unit cell parameters are:

a = 10.1 Å, b = 13.4 Å, c = 4.7 Å and β = 104.3°,

with slightly different values given by different sources:

a = 10.086 Å, b = 13.441 Å, c = 4.703 Å, β = 104.27°
a = 10.06 Å, b = 13.41 Å, c = 4.696 Å, β = 104.3°
a = 10.034–10.086 Å, b= 13.434–13.441 Å, c= 4.687–4.714 Å, β = 102.65–104.27°
a = 10.024(6) Å, b = 13.436(3) Å, c = 4.693(4) Å, β = 102.30(5)°

== Appearance ==
The mineral may occur as crystals, or as masses or concretions. The crystals are usually prismatic parallel to the c-crystal axis, and flattened perpendicular to the b-axis. Equant crystals are rarer. They may also occur as stellate (star-shaped) groups, or encrustations with a bladed or fibrous structure. Unaltered specimens are colorless to very pale green, but they oxidize on exposure to light (and possibly also in situ) to blue, then darker green, brown, purple and purplish black. The streak is white, altering to dark blue or brown. Crystals are transparent to translucent with a vitreous luster, pearly on the cleavage surface, or dull and earthy.

== Optical properties ==
Vivianite is biaxial (+) with refractive indices approximately:

n_{α} = 1.58, n_{β} = 1.6, n_{γ} = 1.6, but different sources give somewhat different values
n_{α} = 1.579, n_{β} = 1.602, n_{γ} = 1.637
n_{α} = 1.579–1.616, n_{β} = 1.602–1.656, n_{γ} = 1.629–1.675
n_{α} = 1.58–1.626, n_{β} = 1.598–1.662, n_{γ} = 1.627–1.699

Birefringence: δ = 0.050–0.059 or 0.0470–0.0730

The refractive indices increase with increasing oxidation, the birefringence decreases, and the pleochroism on {010} becomes stronger.

The angle between the optic axes, 2V, has been measured as between 63° and 83.5°; it can also be calculated from the refractive indices, giving a value between 78° and 88°. The dispersion of the optic axes is weak, with r<v, or non-existent. Vivianite is pleochroic with X= blue, deep blue or indigo-blue; Y= pale yellowish green, pale bluish green or yellow-green; Z= pale yellowish green or olive-yellow. X is parallel to the b-crystal axis and Z is inclined to the c-crystal axis at an angle of 28.5°. It is not fluorescent.

== Physical properties ==
Vivianite is a soft mineral, with Mohs hardness only 1 1/2 to 2, and specific gravity 2.7. It splits easily, with perfect cleavage perpendicular to the b-crystal axis, due to the sheet-like structure of the mineral. It is sectile, with a fibrous fracture, and thin laminae parallel to the cleavage plane are flexible. It is easily soluble in acids. It has a melting point of 1,114 °C (2,037 °F), it darkens in color in H_{2}O_{2}, and is not radioactive.

== Geological setting ==
Vivianite is a secondary mineral found in a number of geologic environments: the oxidation zone of metal ore deposits, in granite pegmatites containing phosphate minerals, in clays and glauconitic sediments, and in recent alluvial deposits replacing organic material such as peat, lignite, bog iron ores and forest soils (all). Bones and teeth buried in peat bogs are sometimes replaced by vivianite. Some authors say that it is particularly associated with gossan, but this is disputed by Petrov.

Associated minerals include metavivianite, ludlamite, pyrite, siderite and pyrrhotite. Hydrothermal veins produce the best crystal specimens with the classic gemmy green color.

The type locality is Wheal Kind (Wheal Kine), West Wheal Kitty group, St Agnes, St Agnes District, Cornwall, England.

== Photo-oxidation ==
Oxidation of vivianite is an internal process induced by exposure of the crystal to visible light; no oxygen or water enters or leaves the mineral from the outside.

A visible-light photon induces the photo-oxidation of divalent Fe^{2+} to trivalent Fe^{3+}. The electron released in the process is then transferred to a H^{+} from a crystal water molecule, thereby reducing it to ½ H_{2} and leaving a hydroxide ion (OH^{−}). The whole process can be summarised as follows from a redox perspective:

Fe^{2+} ⇄ Fe^{3+} + e^{−} (oxidation reaction)

H_{2}O + e^{−} ⇌ ½ H_{2} + OH^{−} (reduction reaction)

Fe^{2+} + H_{2}O ⇌ Fe^{3+} + ½ H_{2} + OH^{−} (global reaction with proper charge balance)

Hydrogen atoms or molecules produced by photo-oxidation may then diffuse into the crystal lattice and, if accumulated locally in sufficient quantities, could mechanically weaken the crystal structure by causing internal tensile stress.

This process starts when visible light falls on the vivianite, and it can occur within a few minutes, drastically changing the color of the mineral. Eventually, the vivianite changes to a new species, metavivianite Fe^{2+}_{2}Fe^{3+}(PO_{4})_{2}(OH)·7H_{2}O, which usually occurs as paramorphs after vivianite.

== Pigment ==
As pigment, vivianite is known as "blue ochre" and has been used since Roman times, though its use in oil painting was somewhat limited. It saw some use in wall paintings and polychromy of medieval Germany and England, as well as Baroque and Rococo Austria and Germany. Most notably, spectroscopic analysis has determined its use in the Baroque art of the Dutch Golden Age, particularly the work of Aelbert Cuyp. It has been found in Vermeer's The Procuress in the blue-grey parts of the carpet in the foreground, and is prominent in the foliage of Rembrandt's Susanna (1636), an early predecessor to his Susanna and the Elders. Vivianite paints pose some problems to art conservators due to its susceptibility to blanching, which produces a hazy look to the work, and further oxidation producing the yellow-brown metavivianite, which can alter the hue and temperature of the composition considerably.

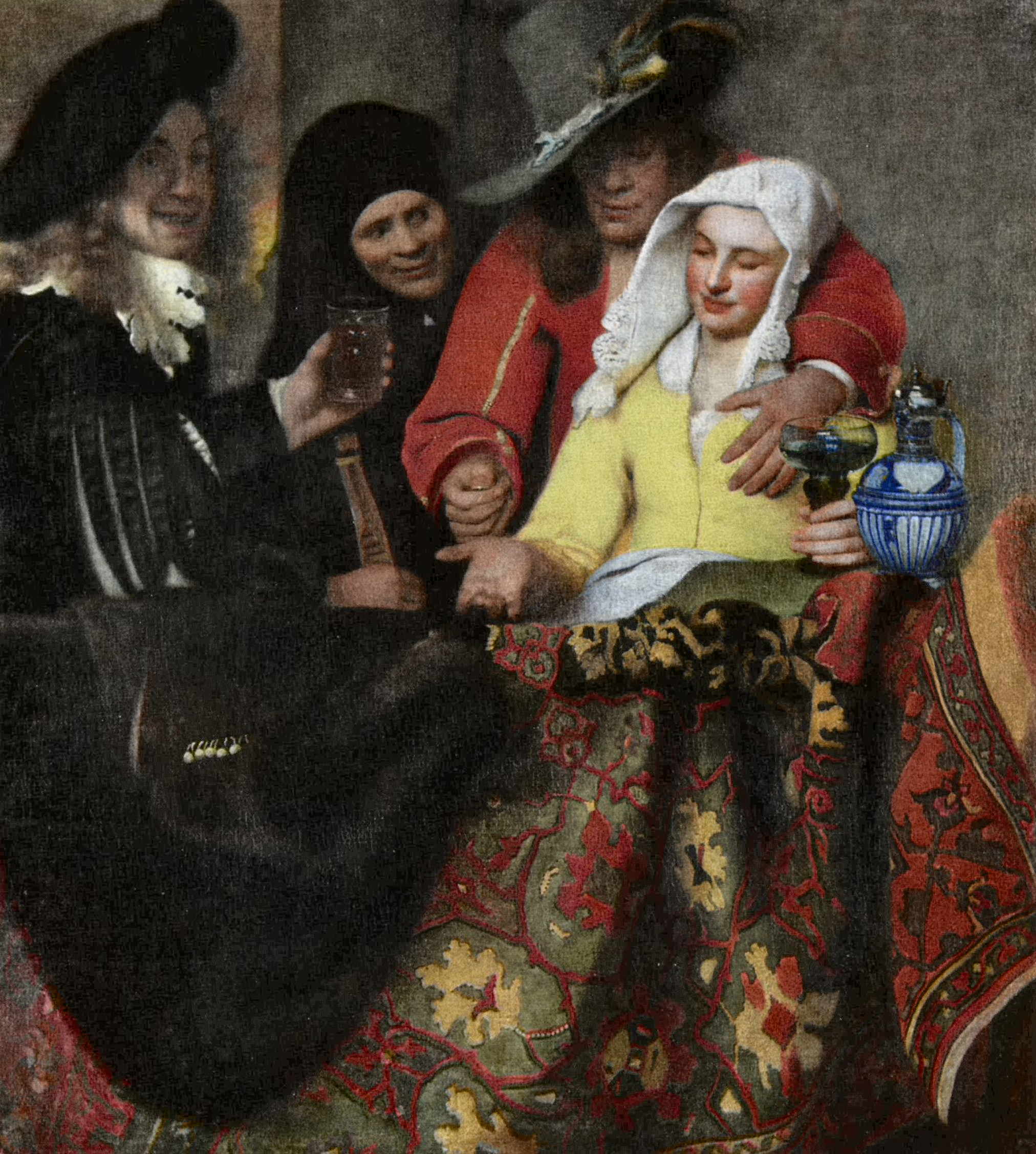
Johannes Vermeer, The Procuress, 1656

== Localities ==
- Bolivia – Llallagua, Potosí: Crystals to 10 cm at the Siglio XX mine. Transparent bottle-green crystals to 10 cm from the San José/San Fermín vein. In general, the vivianite occurs as prismatic crystals on a matrix of botryoidal goethite derived from the alteration of pyrite and marcasite. Specimens found in 2000 were associated with childrenite, cronstedtite, pyrrhotite, franckeite and pink massive sphalerite.
- Brazil – Cigana Mine, Galileia, Minas Gerais, with muscovite and pyrite. Typically wedge-shaped crystals of vivianite to 11 cm across, of medium lustre, smoke-blue color and good transparency on matrix of sharp silvery muscovite plates, some with druses of pyrite microcrystals.
- Cameroon – The world's largest vivianite crystals (more than a meter long) from mud.
- Canada – In bog iron at Côte St Charles, Vaudreuil-Soulanges, Montérégie, Québec.
- Germany – In the limonite ores in Amberg-Auerbach and in the pegmatites of Hagendorf, Bavaria.
- Japan – At Nagasawa, Iwama, Ibaraki Prefecture, vivianite was found along fractures in rocks rich in graphite, pyrite and pyrrhotite. The vivianite is intimately associated with pyrite and occurs as very thin tabular crystals, up to 10 cm in length.
- Kosovo – Trepča Mines, Stari Trg. Thick prismatic crystals up to 10 cm long and 2 cm thick, relatively stable. Deep green in color and transparent, commonly resting on pyrrhotite or pyrite, and in some cases on quartz or carbonates.
- Mexico – In blue-green gem quality crystals to 8 cm at the San Antonio Mine, Santa Eulalia, Chihuahua.
- New Zealand – Small amounts of vivianite are present within the sediments of Lake Kohangapiripiri.
- Russia – In sedimentary stratified iron ore deposits on the Taman Peninsula on the Black Sea.
- Slovenia – In Idrija mine, 2 mm bluish vivianite crystals in fissures of Langobardian sandstone were found.
- Spain – At the Brunita mine, Cartagena, Murcia, vivianite was found as deep green crystals, up to 8 cm
- Ukraine – In the Kerch iron ore basin in the Crimean Peninsula, peatlands of Volyn' region and Zakarpattia region.
- United States – In diatomite in a tertiary lake bed near Burney, Shasta County, California. Also in green sand at Middletown, New Castle County, Delaware. At Blackbird Mine, Lemhi County, Idaho: crystals in shades of pink, green, greyish blue, purple and purplish black, as well as colorless; the unique, deep purple is characteristic of some Blackbird mine specimens, while some single crystals have both purple and green zones. Usually elongated and blade-like. They occur as singles and groups on dark altered schist and on white quartz. Associated minerals include ludlamite, quartz and siderite. Also abundant in the pegmatites of Newry, Maine.

== On Mars ==
A September 10, 2025 paper published in Nature reported the "likely" detection of vivianite and greigite in the Jezero crater on Mars, by the Perseverance rover. It is considered a potential biosignature of iron-oxidizing biota.

== See also ==
- List of minerals
- List of minerals named after people
- Photogeochemistry
- Hydrogen production by radiolysis
- Radiolysis
- Natural hydrogen
  - Schikorr reaction
  - Serpentinization#Formation of magnetite and hydrogen
