= Bostane =

Bostane Бостане (Serbian) Bostan (Albanian)
- Village
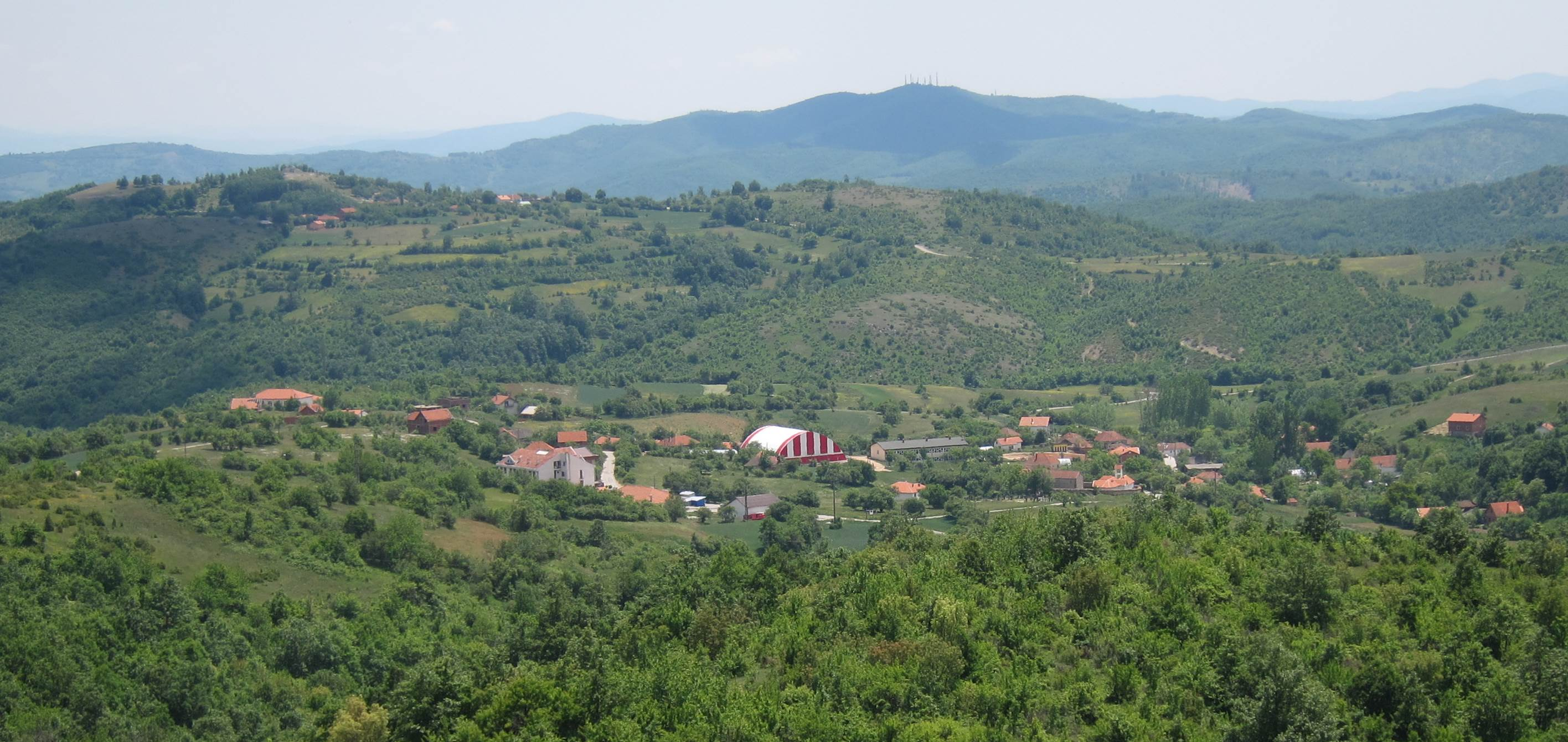
- Bostane seen from nearby hills

- Location within Kosovo
- Coordinates: 42°36′05″N 21°25′34″E
- Country: Kosovo
- District: District of Pristina
- Municipality: Novo Brdo

Area
  - Total: 8.97 km^{2} (3.46 sq mi)

Population (1991)
  - Total: 992
- Time zone: UTC+1 (CET)
  - Summer (DST): UTC+2 (CEST)
- Vehicle registration: 01

Bostane (Serbian: Бостане; Albanian: Bostan) is a village in Novo Brdo municipality, Kosovo. It is located in northern part of the municipality and it is official seat of the Novo Brdo municipality.

== Geography ==
By settlement type Bostane can be classified as dispersed village made of four parts (Serbian: махала, mahala):

- Bostane,
- Plavica,
- Čuljkova Mahala and
- Šumaci.

It is located on the southern side of Novo Brdo hill and Mala planina (translated as "Little mountain") and around Bostanički and Plavički streams.

It borders with villages Novo Brdo on north, Izvor and Prekovce on west, Jasenovik and Klobukar on east and Trnićevce on south. The village lies on R123 road, that on west connects Bostane to Labljane and further to Gračanica and Priština via M25-2 road and on east connects Bostane with Kosovska Kamenica. In village is located northern end of R213 road that connects this village and Gnjilane via Gornji Makreš and Stanišor.

== Population ==
According to controversial Kosovo data after 2011 census (Note: Census was mostly boycotted by Serbs in Novo Brdo municipality and other Serb enclaves.), in Bostane had 487 inhabitants. Of the total population, 196 were declared as Serbs, 221 as Albanians and 63 as Romani. Historically, Serbs made majority of the population in Bostane.
