= Prekovce =

Prekovce Прековце (Serbian) Prekoc (Albanian)
- Village
- Interactive map of Prekovce
- Coordinates: 42°34′02″N 21°24′00″E
- Country: Kosovo
- District: District of Pristina

Area
  - Total: 8.12 km^{2} (3.14 sq mi)

Population (1991)
  - Total: 489
- Time zone: UTC+1 (CET)
  - Summer (DST): UTC+2 (CEST)
- Vehicle registration: 01

Prekovce (Serbian Cyrillic: Прековце; Albanian: Prekoc) is a village in Novo Brdo municipality in Kosovo. It is located in the western part of the municipality about 5 km from municipality seat and it lies on both banks of Kriva reka.

== Geography ==
By settlement type it can be classified as dispersed village made of six village parts (Serbian: махала, mahala):

- Zabeljci
- Čuka
- Žerovi
- Tirinčani
- Malenovci
- Prekovce as main part of the village territory.

It borders with villages Izvor on the north, Labljane on the west, Bostane and Trnićevce on east and Zebince on south. The village lies on regional road R123 that on eastern end connects Prekovce with municipality seat and on the western end it makes connection to M25-2 main road (Priština — Gnjilane). In village center there is crossroad to local road via Zebince, Straža and Stanišor to Gnjilane.

== Population ==
According to controversial Kosovo data after 2011 census (Note: Census was mostly boycotted by Serbs in Novo Brdo municipality and other Serb enclaves.), in Prekovce lived 214 Serbs, which make 100% of the village population. Historically, besides Serbs in village lived few Albanian families that settled Prekovce in 1878.
