= Zebince (Novo Brdo) =

Zebince Зебинце (Serbian) Zebincë (Albanian)
- Village
- Location within Kosovo
- Coordinates: 42°33′38″N 21°24′37″E
- Country: Kosovo
- District: District of Pristina
- Municipality: Novo Brdo

Area
  - Total: 8.59 km^{2} (3.32 sq mi)

Population (1991)
  - Total: 280
- Time zone: UTC+1 (CET)
  - Summer (DST): UTC+2 (CEST)
- Vehicle registration: 01

Zebince (Serbian: Зебинце, Zebince; Albanian: Zebincë/Zebinca) is a village in Novo Brdo municipality, Kosovo. It is located in western part of the municipality about 5 km from municipality seat and it lies on both banks of Kriva reka.

== Etymology ==
Name of village Zebince is originated from Serbian language. Its name is derived from Serbian adjective зебно (zebno, translated as "cold" or "chilly"), which can be linked to cold weather usual for winter time in this mountainous area. It was first time mentioned in 1674 in written documents of Michael Kantakouzenos.

== Geography ==
By settlement type Zebince can be classified as dispersed village made of five parts (Serbian: махала, mahala):

- Gornja Mahala,
- Donja Mahala,
- Dolina,
- Slatina and
- Đurina Padina.

It borders with villages Prekovce on north, Paralovo on west, Manišince and Gornji Makreš on east and Straža on south. The village lies on local road Prekovce — Stanišor, that on northern end links Zebince with R123 road and further to Gračanica and Priština via M25-2 road on north and to Gnjilane on south.

== Population ==
According to controversial Kosovo data after 2011 census (Note: Census was mostly boycotted by Serbs in Novo Brdo municipality and other Serb enclaves.), in Zebince lived 165 Serbs, which make 100% of the village population. Historically, Serbs were only settlers of this village and many families came in this village in few waves of migrations. Firstly, population grew thanks to positive fertility rate until the peak of Yugoslav socialist era and first Albanian protests in 1968 in Priština, when population started slowly to decline because of the lack of security and stability.
