= Metavivianite =

Hydrated iron phosphate mineral

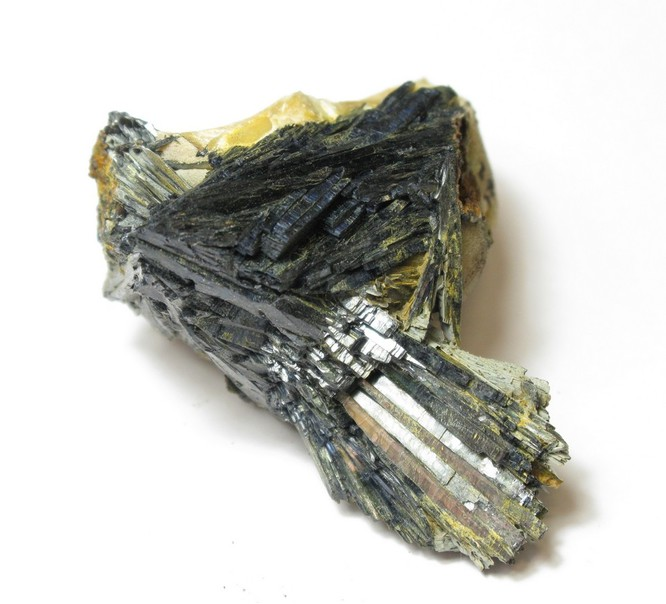
- A 6x4 cm specimen of paramorphosed olive-green to green Metavivianite after oxidized vivianite. From Kerchenskoe deposit, Crimea Oblast, Ukraine. Photo and collection specimen by Pavel Kartashov.

General
- Category: Phosphate mineral
- Formula: Fe^{2+}Fe^{3+}_{2}(PO_{4})_{2}(OH)_{2}·6H_{2}O
- IMA symbol: Mviv
- Strunz classification: 8.DC.25 (10 ed); 7/C.14-20 (8 ed)
- Dana classification: 40.11.9.4
- Crystal system: Triclinic
- Crystal class: Pinacoidal (1)
- Space group: P1bar
- Unit cell: a = 7.989(1) Å, b = 9.321(2) Å c = 4.629(1) Å; α = 97.34(1)°; β = 95.96(1)°; γ = 108.59(2)°

Identification
- Formula mass: 499.548 g/mol
- Color: Dark blue to blue-black; Dark green to green-black
- Crystal habit: Bladed crystals, often with irregular acute multiple terminations.
- Twinning: {110}
- Cleavage: Perfect on {110}
- Tenacity: Sectile
- Mohs scale hardness: 1.5–2
- Luster: Sub-vitreous, Resinous, Greasy, Dull
- Streak: Blue or greenish blue
- Diaphaneity: translucent
- Specific gravity: 2.69
- Optical properties: Biaxial (+)
- Refractive index: n_{α} = 1.600 – 3.000, n_{β} = 1.640 – 3.000, n_{γ} = 1.685 – 3.000
- Birefringence: δ = 0.050 – 0.085
- Pleochroism: Visible; X = blue to blue-green; Y,Z = yellow-green
- 2V angle: Measured: 85° (5), Calculated: 90°
- Dispersion: Very weak
- Ultraviolet fluorescence: Not fluorescent

Metavivianite (Fe^{2+}Fe^{3+}_{2}(PO_{4})_{2}(OH)_{2}·6H_{2}O) is a hydrated iron phosphate mineral found in a number of geological environments. As a secondary mineral it is typically formed from oxidizing vivianite. Metavivianite is typically found as dark blue or dark green prismatic to flattened crystals.

It was named by C. Ritz, Eric J. Essene, and Donald R. Peacor in 1974 for its structural relationship to vivianite.

== See also ==
- List of minerals
