= Novo Brdo =

Novo Brdo: Novobërda or Artana (Albanian) Novo Brdo or Ново Брдо (Serbian)
- Town and municipality
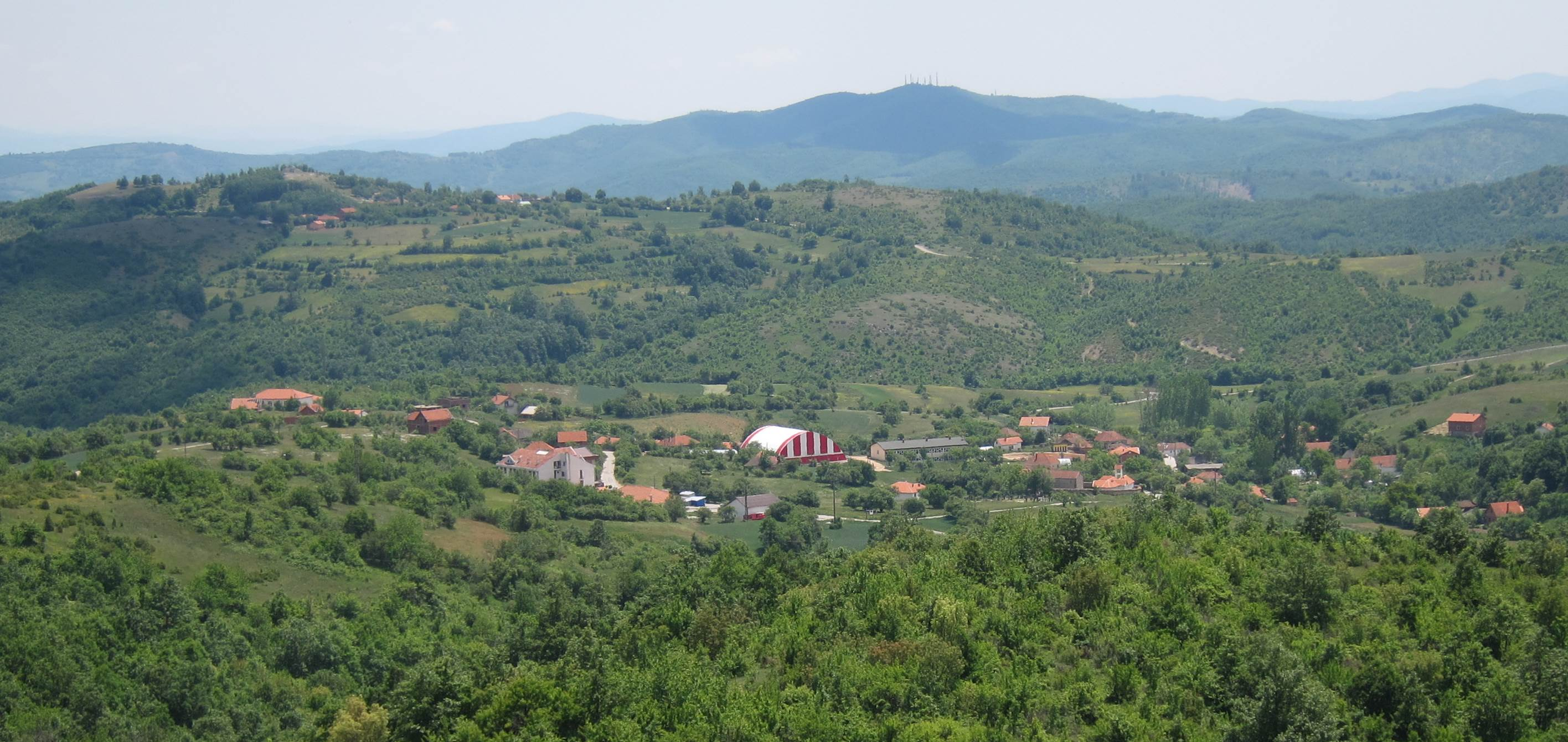
- View on Novo Brdo

- Seal
- Interactive map of Novo Brdo
- Location within Kosovo
- Coordinates: 42°36′N 21°26′E
- Country: Kosovo
- District: Pristina
- Settlements: 26

Government
  - Mayor: Saša Milošević (SL)

Area
  - Total: 204.25 km^{2} (78.86 sq mi)
- Elevation: 946 m (3,104 ft)

Population (2024)
  - Total: 4,495
  - Density: 22.01/km^{2} (57.00/sq mi)
- Time zone: UTC+1 (CET)
  - Summer (DST): UTC+2 (CEST)
- Postal code: 16000
- Area code: +381(0)38
- Vehicle registration: 01
- Website: kk.rks-gov.net/novoberde

Novo Brdo (Serbian Cyrillic: Ново Брдо), or Novobërda or Artana (Albanian indefinite form: Novobërdë or Artanë), is a town and municipality located in the Pristina district of Kosovo. According to the 2011 census, it has a population of 6,729 inhabitants. The center of the municipality is the village of Bostane. The region is especially known for its role in mining during medieval times, in particular after the construction of the Novo Brdo Fortress by Stefan Milutin (King of Serbia) to house Saxon miners who were brought in the region. According to the 2024 census, it has an Albanian majority.

== Name ==
In Serbian (and also English) "Novo Brdo" is used, literally meaning "New Hill". The name was derived from the medieval Serbian mining town of Novo Brdo. In Albanian, "Novobërdë" or "Artanë" is used. It was known as Novar (نوار) or Novaberde (نواـبـرده) in Ottoman Turkish.

== History ==
=== Middle Ages ===
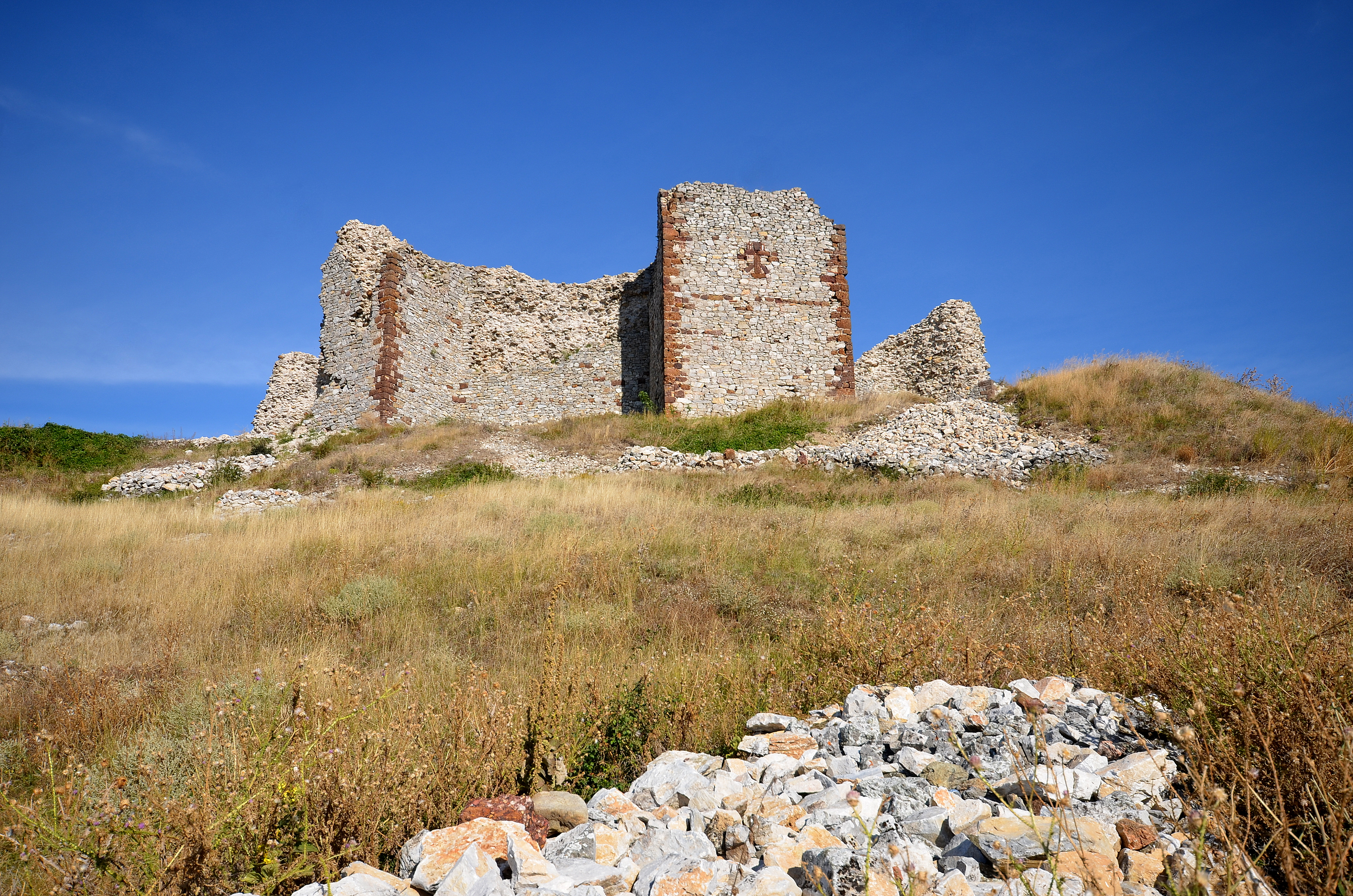
Novo Brdo Fortress, built by Serbian king Stefan Milutin

Novo Brdo is an archaeological site. Novo Brdo was mentioned with its present name in historical documents as early as 1326. It served as the most important mining community in the Balkans during the 15th century. Previously it was known as Novus Mons or Novamonte in Latin and as Nyeuberghe in Saxon texts. The famous scribe Vladislav the Grammarian was born here.

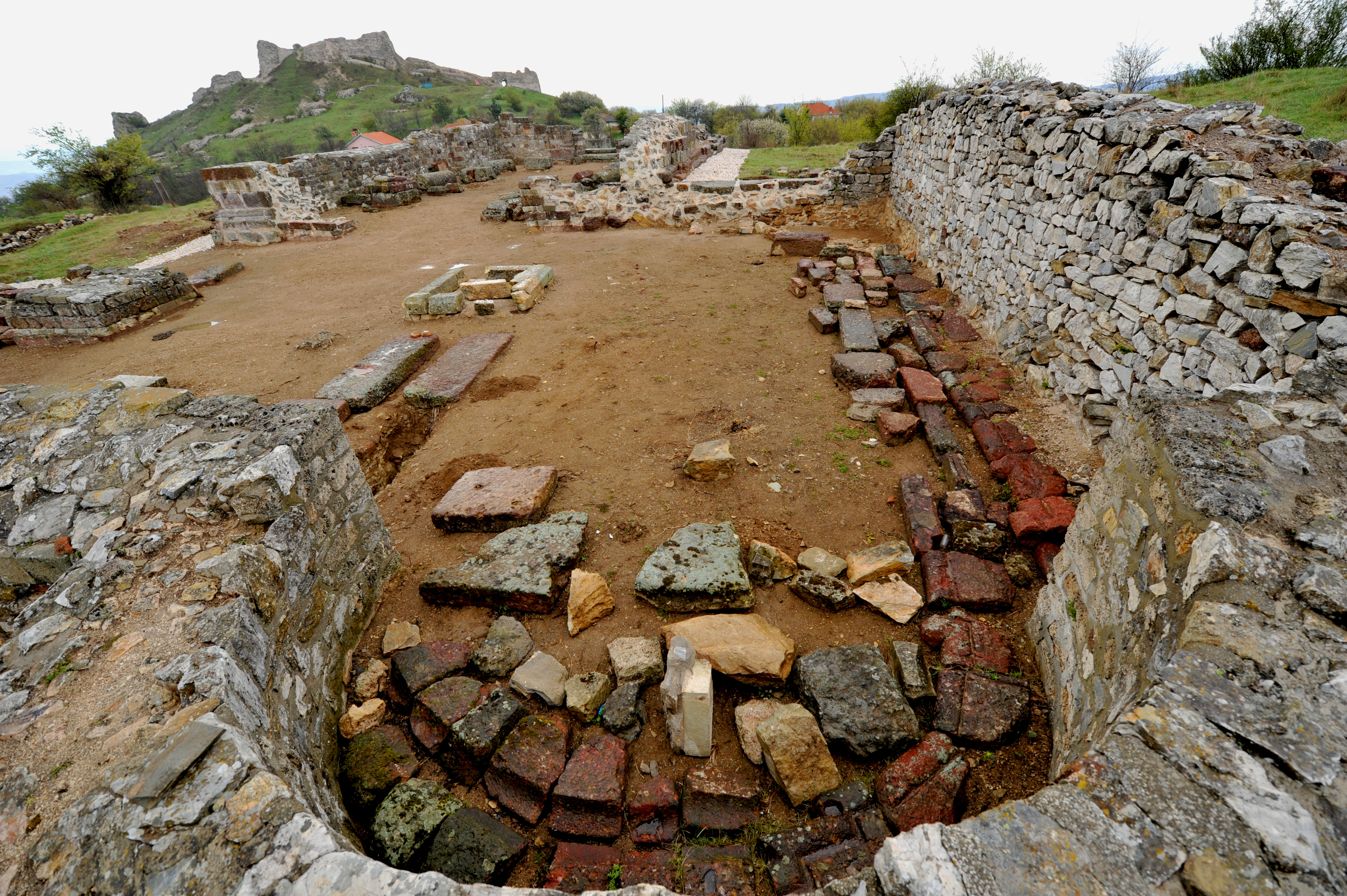
Ruins of Artana Cathedral

The arrival of Saxon miners resulted in the emergence of mining towns in the Balkans in the 13th and 14th century, among them Novo Brdo. Despite much of Novo Brdo's early history being a mystery, the development of the town was heavily influenced by Saxon migrants, with mining operations first starting under the reign of the Serbian King Stefan Milutin. After 50 years, the Novo Brdo mine became the most prosperous in Medieval Serbia and housed a state mint that produced the most silver in the country. Saxon miners introduced efficient mining techniques and implemented a legal system that granted them greater autonomy.

Albanians settled Novo Brdo during the 13th to 14th century to work in the local mines, thus reinforcing the Albanian population in Kosovo. Subsequent waves of Catholic Albanians kept arriving in Novo Brdo up until the 17th century. Ragusan documents attest to the presence of a significant number of Albanians living in Novo Brdo throughout the 14th and early 15th centuries, including members of the Catholic Albanian clergy with names such as Gjergjash and Gjinko, Gjini, son of Gjergji, the presbyter (1382); the reverend Gjergj Gega, Nikollë Tanushi, Gjergj Andrea Pellini and Nikolla Progonovic. In the book of debtors belonging to Ragusan merchant Mihail Lukarevic, who resided in Novo Brdo during the 1430s, 150 Albanian household heads were mentioned as living in Novo Brdo with their families. They worked as miners, artisans and specialists in the mines of Novo Brdo. The anthroponomy of these figures is characteristically Albanian; distinctive Albanian names such as Gjon, Gjin, Tanush, Progon, Lek, Gjergj and Bibë are mentioned. Some families had a mixed Slav-Albanian anthroponomy - that is to say, a Slavic first name and an Albanian last name, or last names with Albanian patronyms and Slavic suffixes such as Gjonoviç, Gjinoviq, Progonoviq, Bushatoviq, Dodishiq, Kondiq, Lekiq and other such names. Many Albanian Catholic priests were registered as residing in Novo Brdo, as well as in towns like Janjevo, Trepça, Prizren and others. These Catholic Albanian priests served as the primary Catholic priests for the town of Novo Brdo.

It is estimated that during the 15th century, Novo Brdo had a population of 4 to 5 thousand people within the fortified city. Beyond the city walls, a network of satellite settlements housed a further 8 to 10 thousand people. Such a large settlement was unusual in Europe where 90 to 95% of all medieval European cities had populations of less than 2 thousand. At the first half of 15th century, Serbian Orthodox bishops of Lipjan resided in Novo Brdo. There were mines and smelting furnaces for iron, lead, gold and silver ores. Novo Brdo silver is known by its glam silver (Latin: argentum de glama; an alloy of silver with 1/6-1/3 gold). In 1450 the mines of Novo Brdo were producing about 6,000 kg of silver per year. The medieval settlement was an important producer of Serbian pottery and other goods. Despite a Serbian population within the city, merchants from the Republic of Ragusa managed international precious metal trade within Novo Brdo. Prior to the Ottoman conquest of the city, Novo Brdo was a Catholic stronghold within the region.

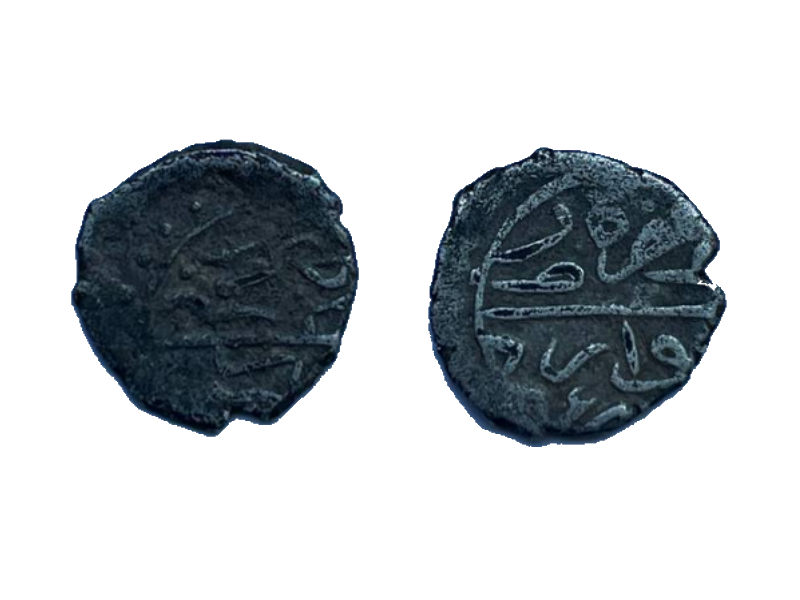
An akçe of Bayezid II minted in Novar 886 AH (1481 AD)

Novo Brdo was the last Serbian town to remain standing during the first Ottoman invasion. In 1439 the capital of Smederevo fell and Serbia resisted until finally Novo Brdo fell in 1441. Novo Brdo was by treaty restored to the Serbs in 1443. The fortress (named in Turkish Nobırda) came under siege for forty days by the Ottomans, before capitulating and becoming occupied by the Ottomans on 1 June 1455. This event is described by Konstantin Mihailović from Ostrovica near Novo Brdo, who was taken by the Ottomans along with some 300 other boys to be trained as Janissaries. All of the higher ranking Serbian officials were executed after the castle fell, with the younger men and boys being taken captive to serve in the Ottoman Army, and some 700 young Serbian women and girls being taken to be wives to Ottoman commanders. When the city fell to the Ottomans, it had an estimated population of about 40,000 people.

An Albanian village named Arbanas is mentioned in the village of Zebinca, south of Novo Brdo in 1545–1574. The village displayed inhabitants with Albanian-Slavic-Chrisitan names.

In the Ottoman Defter of 1591, the city of Novo Brdo itself was recorded within the Sanjak of Viçitrina - this defter included the household heads of the city. The city consisted of several Muslim neighbourhoods (Mahalla/Mëhalla); they were Xhamia Sherif (Sherif Mosque, 26 households), Kasap (11 households), Hamam (21 households), Darbbane (40 households) and Mehmed Çelebi (5 households). There were also 6 Jewish households, including 1 that hailed from Catalonia and 1 that hailed from Castille. Of the Christian neighbourhoods (Mahalla/Mëhalla), the following had inhabitants of mixed Albanian-Slavic/Orthodox anthroponomy: Sokraja (15 households), Pop Simoni (12 households), Çarshi (13) and Himandin (9). Slavic/Orthodox anthroponomy predominated in the following neighbourhoods: Sveti Petra (19 households), Sveti Nika (9 households), Marko Kërsti (26 households), Filip (9 households), Pop Krilovina (10 households), Kallogjer Gligorija (6 households), Kovaç Radosavi (16 households), Shagliçiq (8 households), Shuster (14 households) and Vuka Mrkshiq (8 households). Characteristic Albanian anthroponomy predominated in the following neighbourhoods: Protopop (9 households), Izllatar (9 households), Pop Grobani (Grubani) (5 households), Pop Bozha (4 households) and Kuriçka (13 households).

During the Great Turkish War, Albanian insurgents participated in a battle fought between the Austrian military unit commanded by Kutschenbach against the Ottomans in Novo Brdo on March 17, 1690, a battle won by the Austrians. Albanians were encouraged to begin the fight against the Ottomans and to intensify their attempts to strengthen their relations with the Albanian insurgents in Kosovo.

=== Modern ===
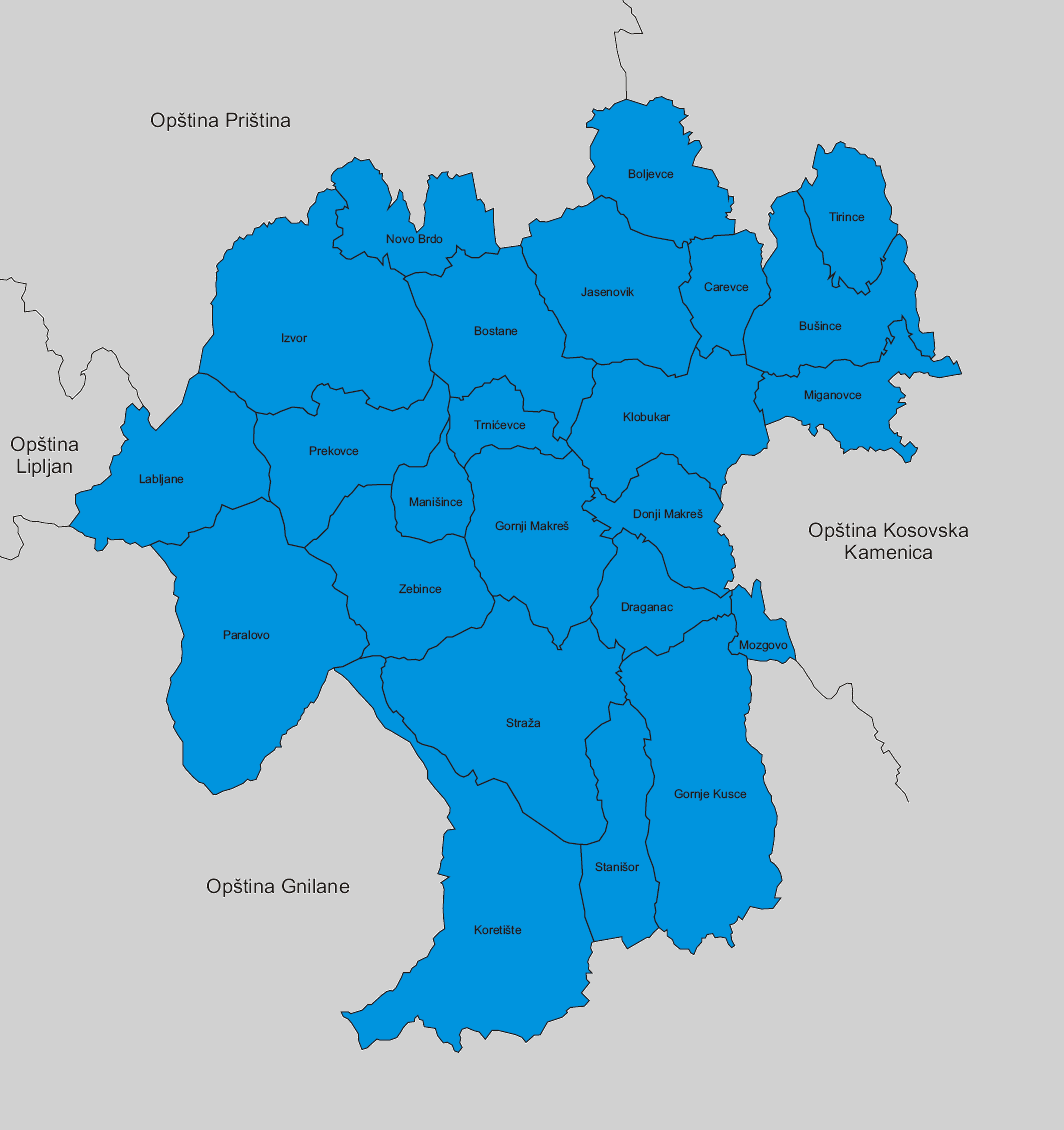
Administrative division of Novo Brdo

By the early 20th century, Novo Brdo's population dwindled, with most inhabitants moving to the more easily accessible area of Gjilan. In 1999, with the entry into Kosovo of KFOR and the United Nations Interim Administration Mission in Kosovo (UNMIK), the area had a small military outpost occupied by US soldiers, as well as a station of International Police and Kosovo Police.

According to the 2013 Brussels Agreement, the municipality was to become part of the Community of Serb Municipalities. Part of the agreement which pertained to the creation of the Association of Serbian municipalities was deemed unconstitutional by Kosovo's Constitutional Court and since then the agreement has been blocked.

== Economy ==
There are two lead and zinc mines operating on the territory of Novo Brdo: Kišnica and Novo Brdo.

== Demographics ==
Municipal historical population
Year	Pop.	±% p.a.
1948	3,960	—
1953	4,548	+2.81%
1961	5,153	+1.57%
1971	5,384	+0.44%
1981	4,984	−0.77%
1991	4,611	−0.77%
2011	6,729	+1.91%
2024	4,495	−3.06%
Source: Division of Kosovo

According to the last official census done in 2011, the municipality has a population of 6,729 inhabitants. In 2020 estimate, the municipality had 7,121 inhabitants.

=== Settlements ===
Municipality of Novo Brdo consists of 26 settlements with following populations:

- Boljevce / Boleci, 72
- Bostane / Bostani, 487
- Bušince / Bushinca, 128
- Carevce / Careci, 27
- Draganac / Draganca, 17
- Izvor / Izvori, 442
- Jasenovik / Jasenoviku, 210
- Klobukar / Kllobukari, 114
- Koretište / Koretishti, 530
- Kosač / Kosaç, 175
- Gortnje Kusce / Kufca e Epërme, 890
- Labljane / Llabjani, 875
- Gornji Makreš / Makresh i Epërm, 58
- Donji Makreš / Makreshi i Poshtëm, 71
- Manišince / Manishinca, 67
- Mozgovo / Mazgova, uninhabited
- Miganovce / Miganoci, 34
- Novo Brdo / Novobërda, 183
- Paralovo / Parallova, 207
- Pasjak / Pasjaku, 1,176
- Prekovce / Prekoci, 214
- Stanišor / Stanishori, 320
- Straža / Strazha, 191
- Trnićevce / Tërniqeci, 50
- Tirince / Tirinca, 26
- Zebince / Zebinca, 165

== Notable people ==
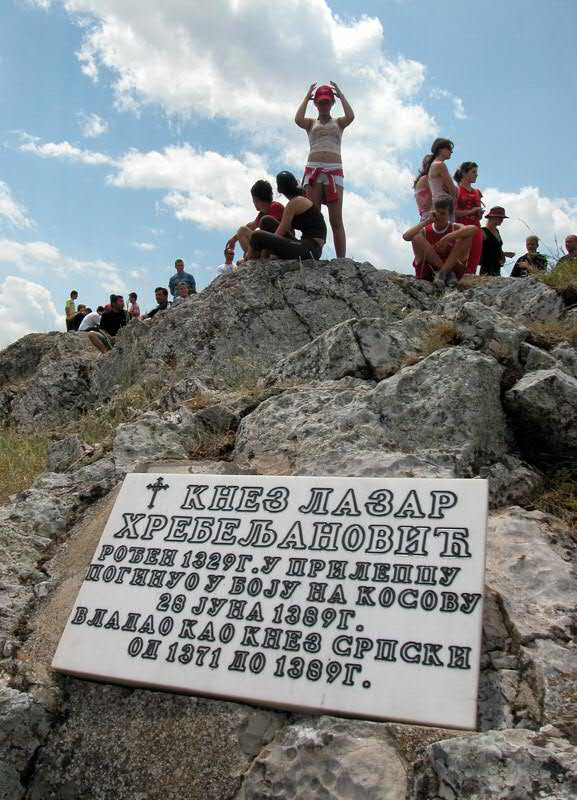
Memorial in Prilepac Fortress, the birthplace of Lazar of Serbia

- Stefan Milutin (c. 1253–1321), King of Serbia and founder of Novo Brdo Fortress.
- Lazar of Serbia (c. 1329–15 June 1389) medieval Serbian prince, born in the fortress of Prilepac near Novo Brdo.
- Dragana of Serbia (c. 1380s – 1395), Empress consort of Bulgaria, born in the Fortress of Prilepac.
- Jelena Lazarević (1365/1366 – 1443) medieval noblewoman, born in the fortress of Prilepac.
- Gjergj Pelini (fl. 1436–died 1463), Albanian Catholic priest and diplomat of Skanderbeg and Venice.
- Dimitrije Kantakouzenos (c. 1435–after 1487), Greco-Serbian writer and poet.
- Vladislav the Grammarian (fl. 1456–1479) Bulgarian Orthodox monk, writer, historian and theologian.
- Feride Rushiti (1970), Kosovan activist.

== See also ==
- Municipalities of Kosovo
