= Artana Cathedral =

Coordinates: 42°36′58″N 21°25′12″E

Ruins of the Novo Brdo Cathedral
- Katedralja e Novobërdës (Albanian); Рушевине катедралне цркве Светог Николе на Новом Брду (Serbian)
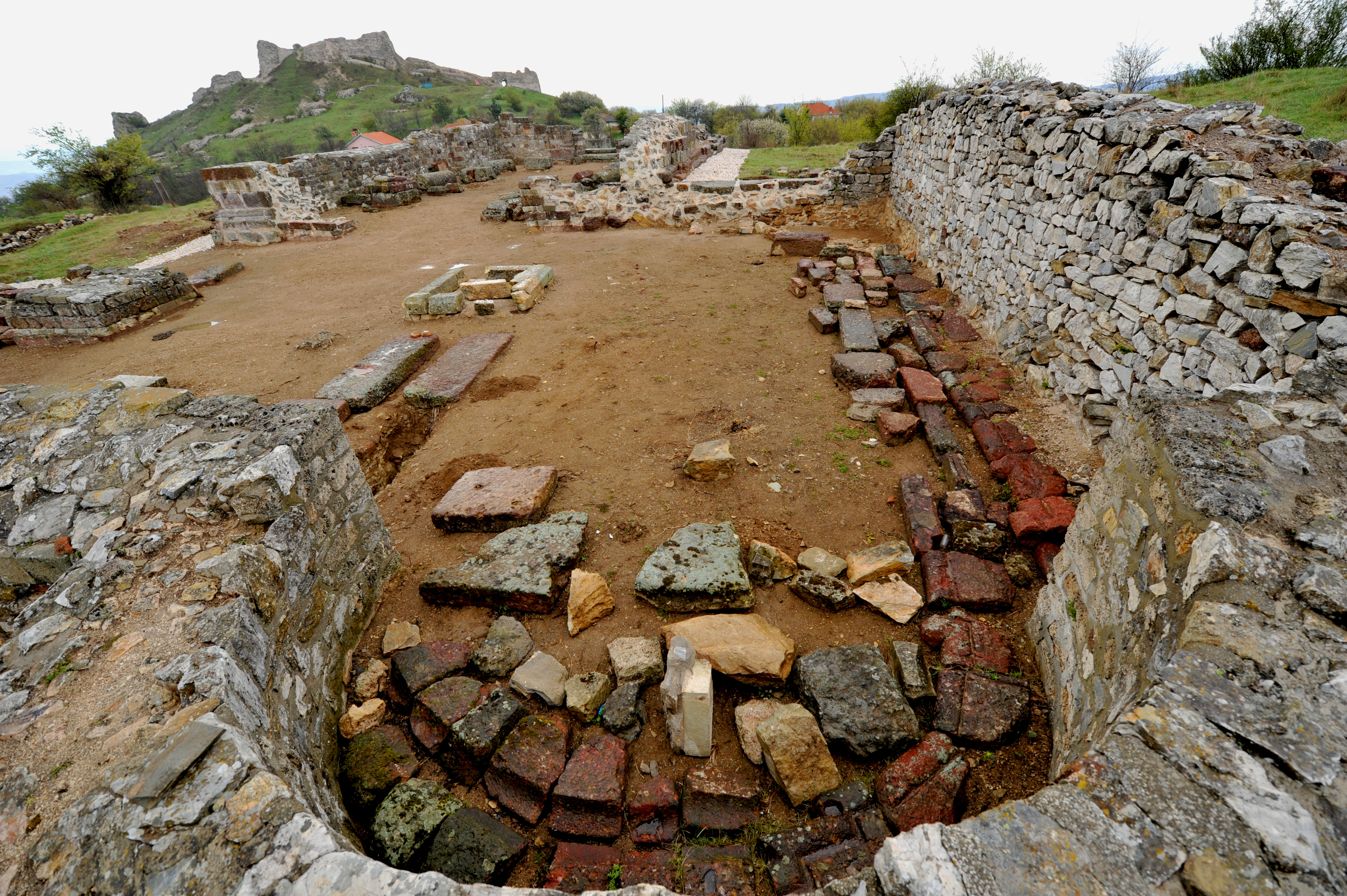
- Interactive map of Ruins of the Novo Brdo Cathedral
- Location: Novo Brdo, Kosovo

History
- Built: 14th century

The ruins of the cathedral church of St. Nicholas on Novo Brdo (Albanian: Katderalja e Novobërdës, Serbian: Рушевине катедралне цркве Светог Николе на Новом Брду, romanized: Ruševine katedralne crkve sv. Nikole na Novom Brdu) are the remains of a medieval Serbian Orthodox church from the 14th century, which was the seat of the bishops of the Serbian Orthodox Church in Novo Brdo and Gracanica.

The temple was built in the middle of the 14th century and was extended during the time of the despot Stefan Lazarević and after 1455. It was built in the Romanesque style of the basilica and until the fall of Novi Brdo under Ottoman rule it was the main Orthodox place of worship. Later, under Ottoman rule, it was turned into a mosque, only to be destroyed in an earthquake and remain in ruins to this day, as well as the remains of the town of Novo Brdo, which was soon abandoned.

In 1897, Serbian Consul General Todor P. Stankovic visited Novo Brdo, visiting Serbian antiquities. There he found a mosque about 140 years old, and on the south-eastern side of the ruins of Novi Brdo he came across the remains of the Orthodox Church of St. Nicholas. Until the middle of the 19th century, the Serbian population gathered in the church once a year. Near the church is the old toponym "Mark's Cross".

Church of St. Nikola was researched in the 60s of the last century, and numerous inscriptions and elements of stone plastic were found there, which clearly indicate the origin of the temple and its style. Numerous Serbian graves were found within the temple.

Not far from the remains of this temple are the remains of the city's Roman Catholic church, the so-called Saxon church, named after the Saxon miners (Sasim), who, in addition to Dubrovnik merchants and the local Serbian population, formed part of the rich and diverse cultural and religious mosaic of medieval Novi Brdo, as one of the most important cities in medieval Serbia. It is said that this "Saška church" was taken by the Turks in 1466, and the following year, 1467, the Nobobrds miners were displaced to Constantinople and the coastal areas. In 1466, the Turks turned the church into a mosque.

== Gallery ==
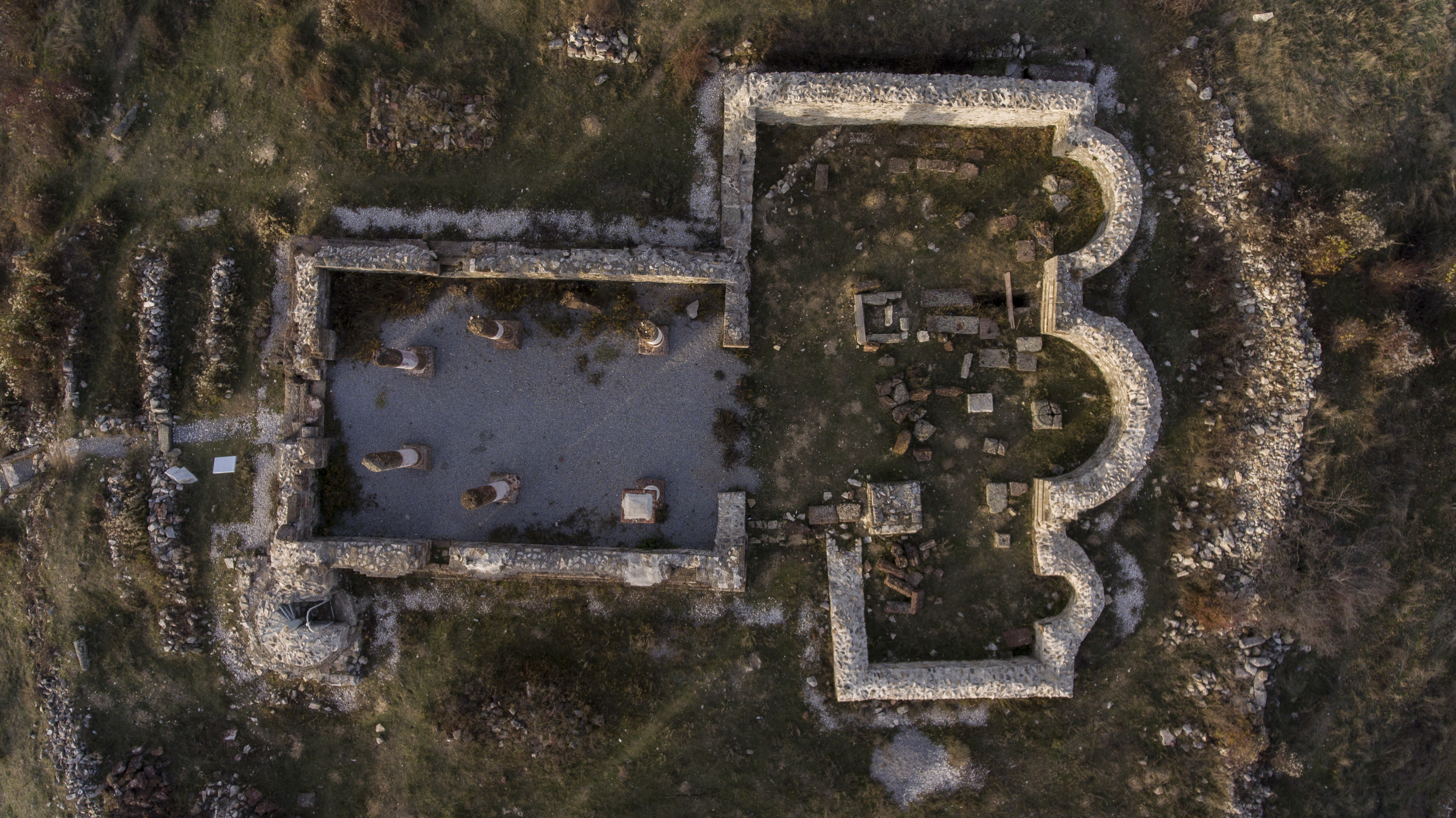

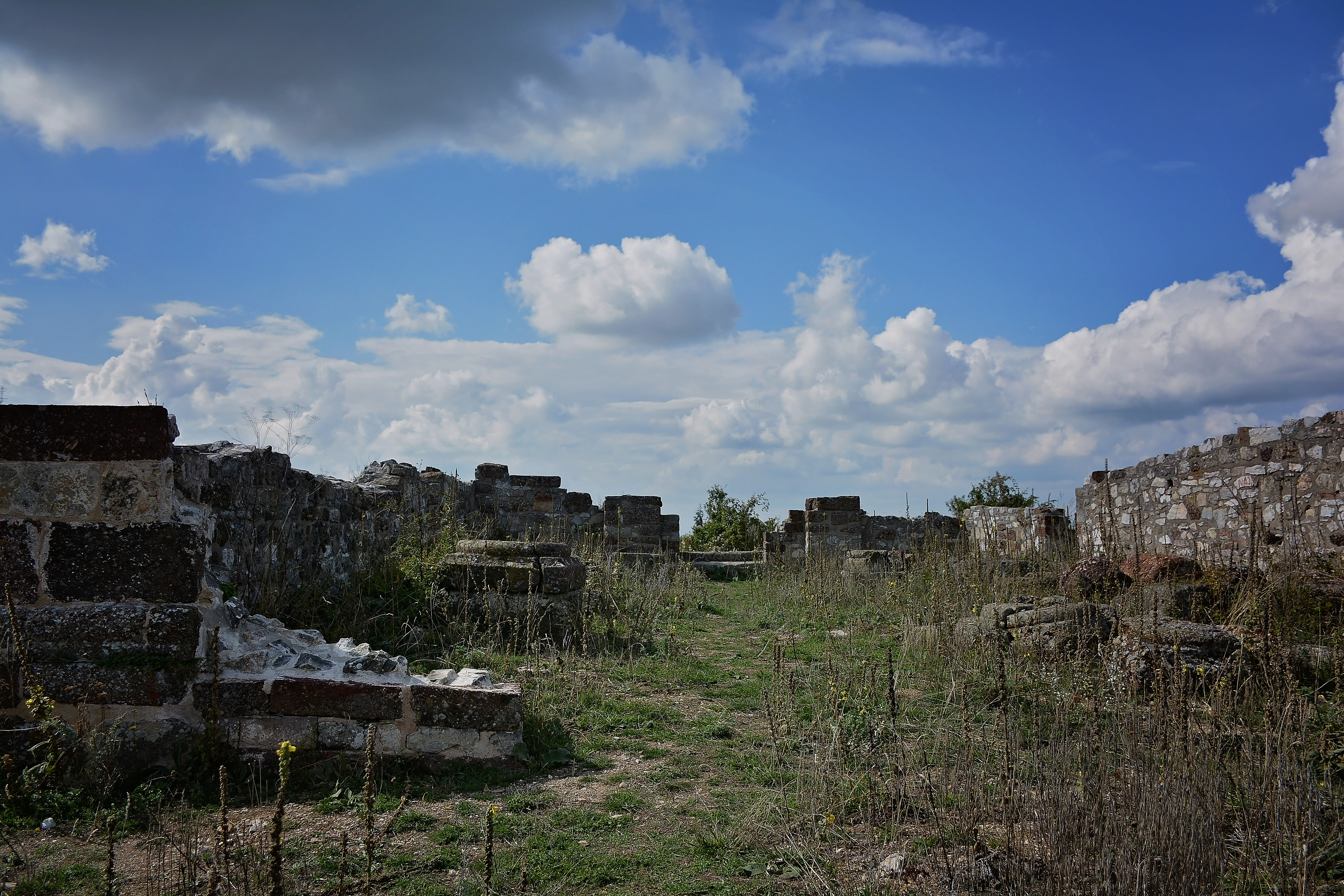

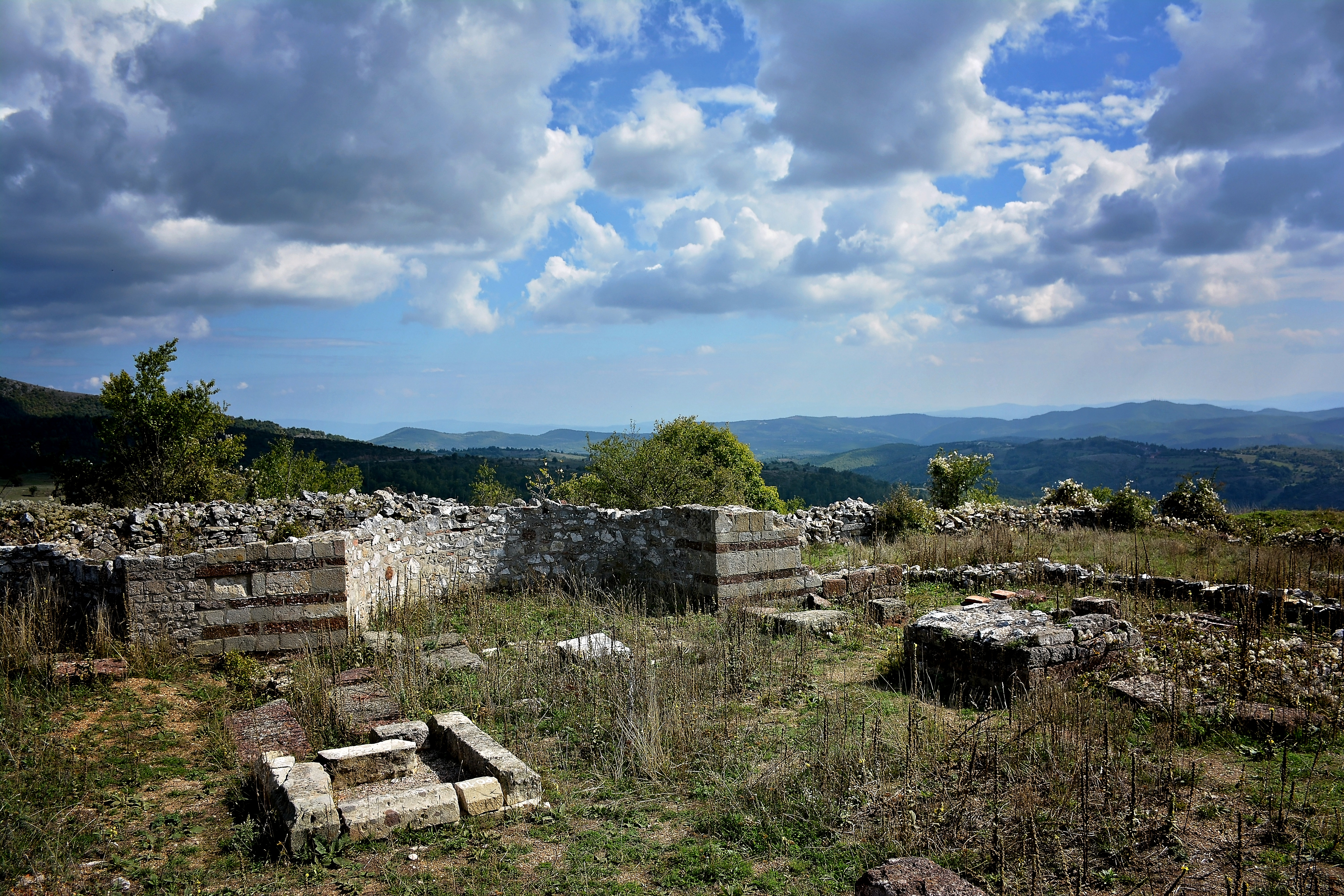

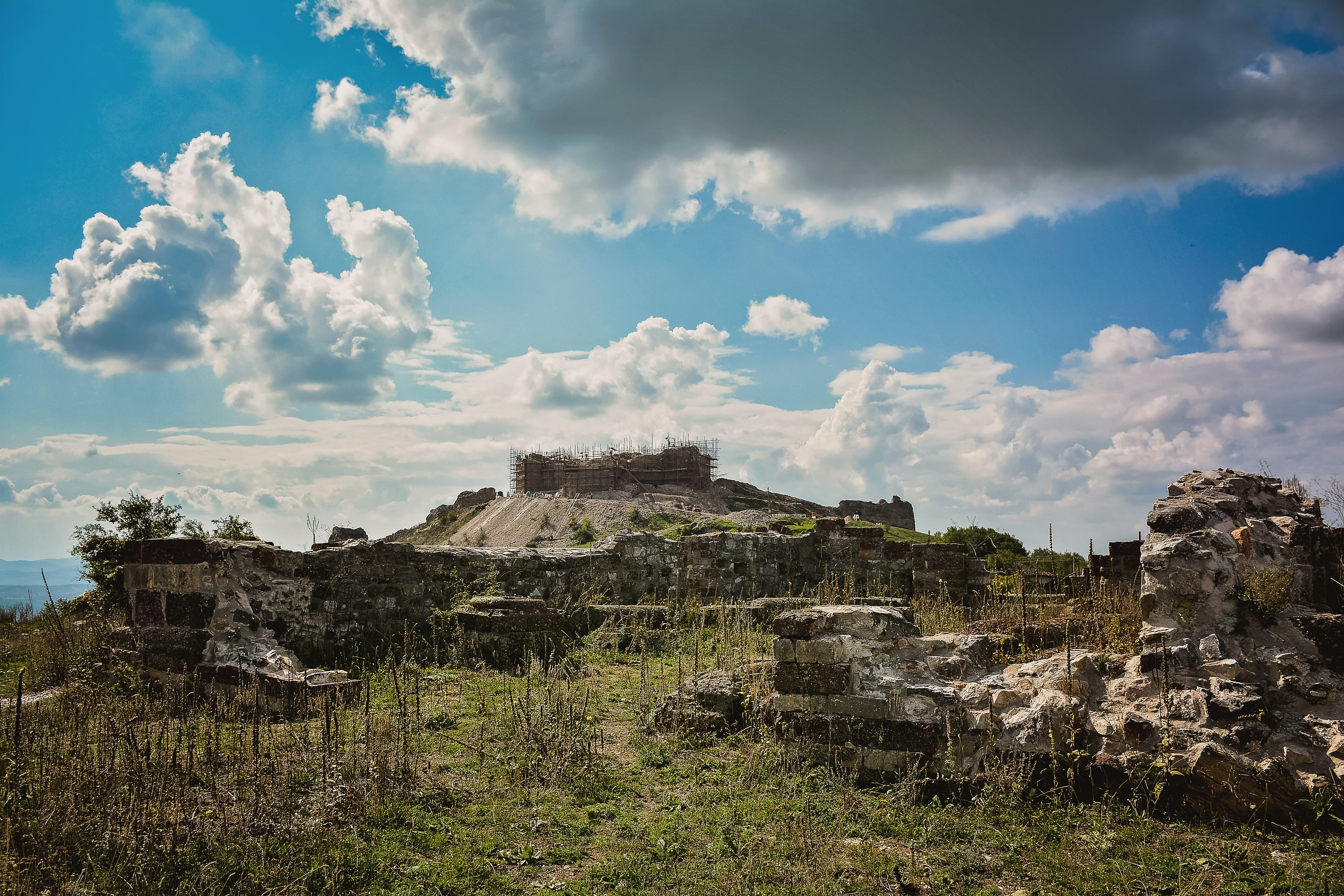

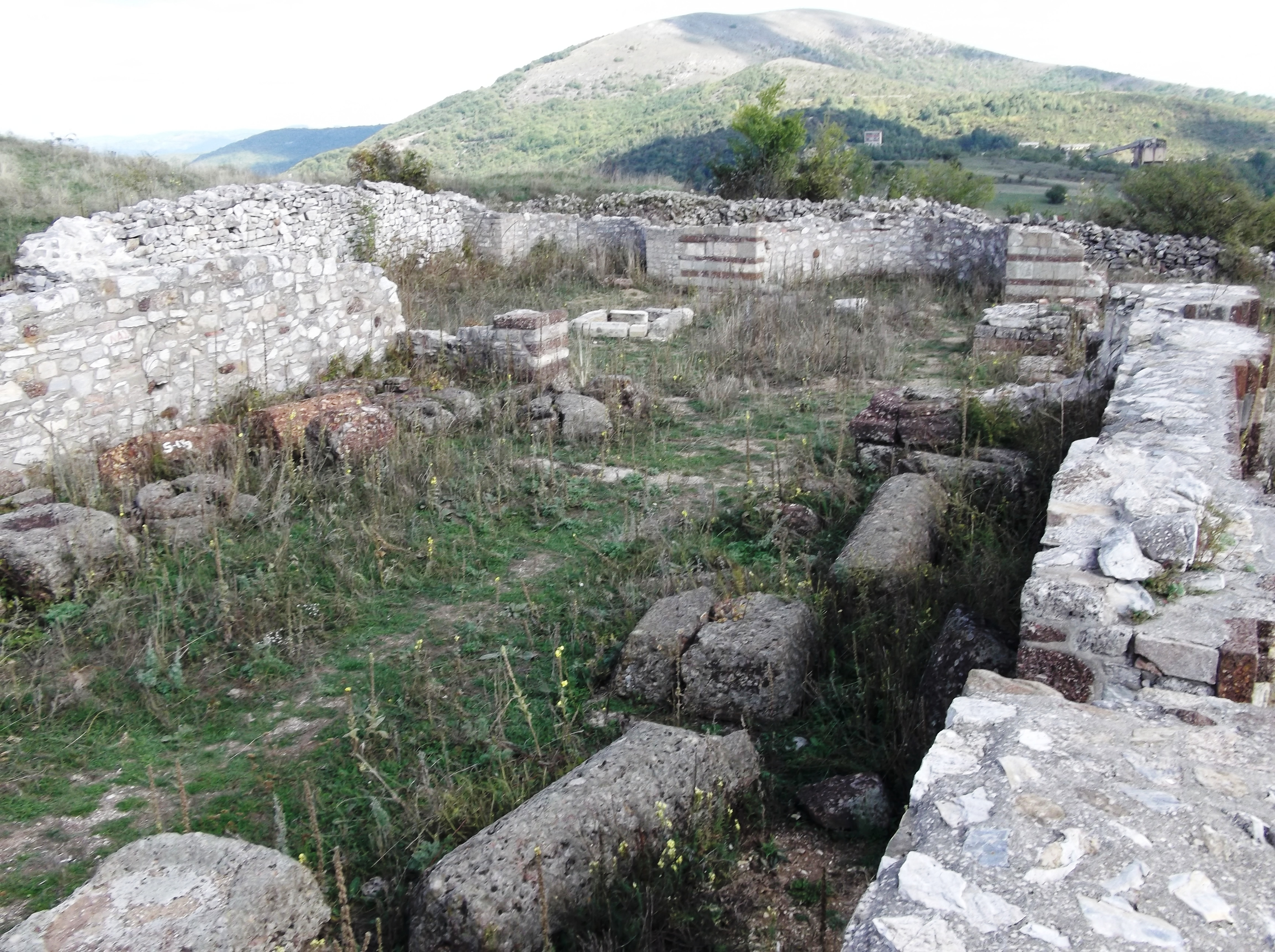

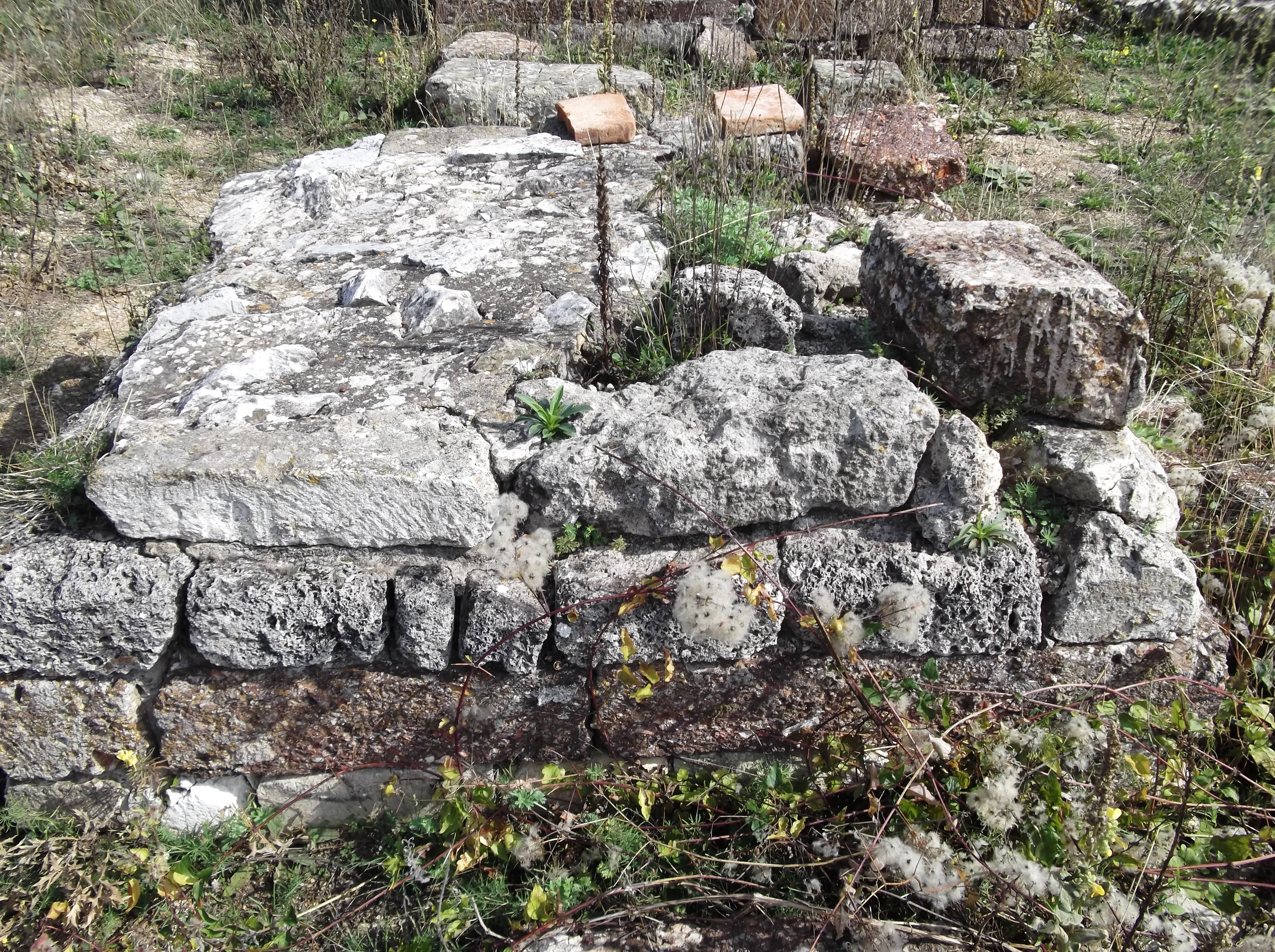

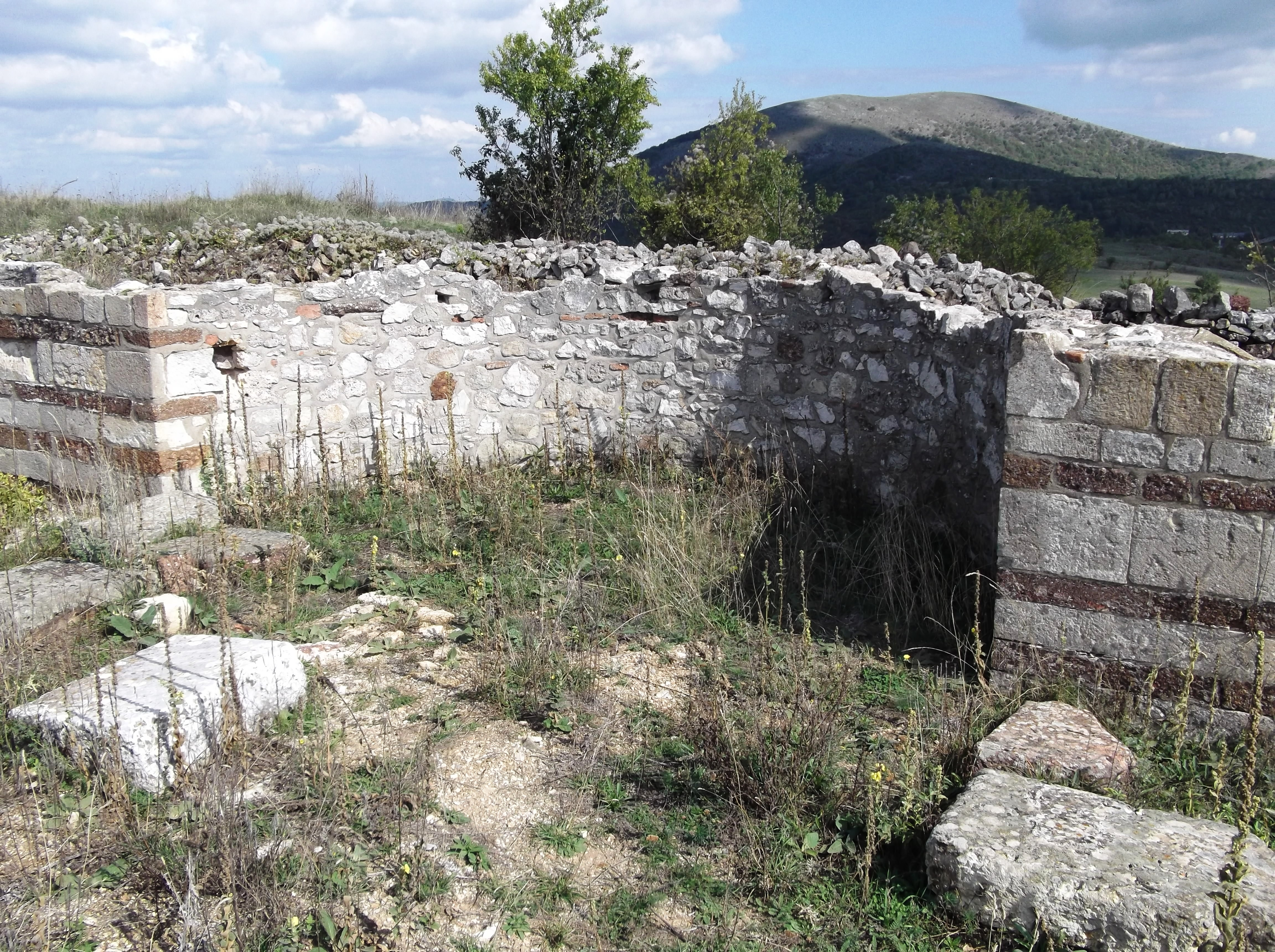
