= Wheal Kitty =

Coordinates: 50.31°N 5.2°W

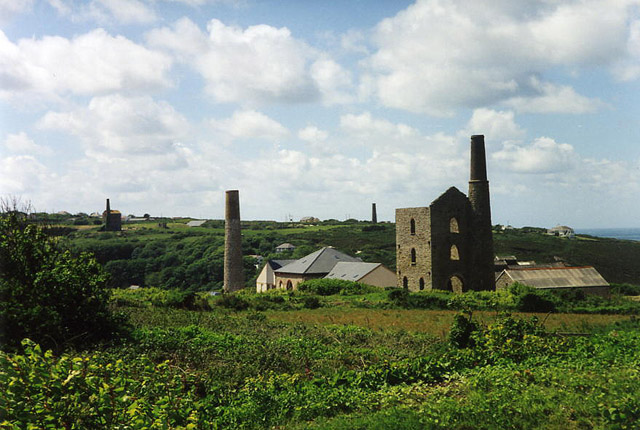

- Location within Cornwall
- Unitary authority: Cornwall
- Ceremonial county: Cornwall
- Region: South West
- Country: England
- Sovereign state: United Kingdom
- Police: Devon and Cornwall
- Fire: Cornwall
- Ambulance: South Western

Wheal Kitty is a village in Cornwall, England, United Kingdom. It is located about half a mile north east of St Agnes on the Goonlaze Downs plateau. It contains the headquarters of Surfers Against Sewage.

== Wheal Kitty Mine ==
The village was noted for the Wheal Kitty Mine with a depth of some 180 fathoms. In ancient times tin was mined in the area. The mine reopened in the 1830s, mining tin and copper ore but was closed in 1842 before reopening ten years later. Two Cornish engine houses and four stacks remain with a 65-inch beam engine constructed by the Perran Foundry in 1852 and installed here in 1910. It pumped water from Sara's Shaft and was reported to be some 950 feet deep. It employed about 220 people in 1914 and closed in 1930.
