= Kišnica mine =

Mine in Kosovo

- Location within Kosovo
- Location: Novo Brdo, Pristina district, Kosovo; 42°36′15.59″N 21°13′3.32″E
- Products: Lead, Zinc, Silver
- Company: Trepca Kosovo

The Kišnica mine is one of the largest lead and zinc mines in Kosovo. The mine is located in Novo Brdo in Pristina district. The mine has reserves amounting to 10.3 million tonnes of ore grading 3.77% lead, 1% zinc and 47gr/t silver thus resulting 390,000 tonnes of lead, 103,300 tonnes of zinc and 17 million oz of silver.
