= Novo Brdo mine =

Mine in Kosovo

- Interactive map of Novo Brdo mine
- Location: Novo Brdo, Pristina district, Kosovo
- Products: Lead, Zinc, Silver
- Company: Trepca Kosovo

The Novo Brdo mine is one of the largest lead and zinc mines in Kosovo. The mine is located in Novo Brdo in Pristina district. The mine has reserves amounting to 2.7 million tonnes of ore grading 4.43% lead, 5.42% zinc and 140.6gr/t silver thus resulting 119,600 tonnes of lead, 146,300 tonnes of zinc and 380 tonnes of silver.
