= Ludlamite =

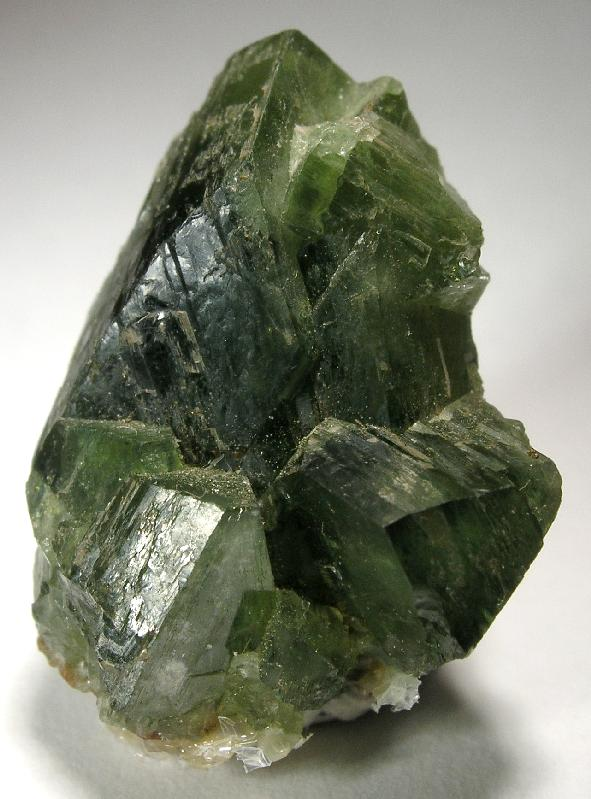

General
- Category: Phosphate mineral
- Formula: (Fe,Mn,Mg)_{3}(PO_{4})_{2}·4H_{2}O
- IMA symbol: Lud
- Strunz classification: 8.CD.20
- Crystal system: Monoclinic
- Crystal class: Prismatic (2/m) (same H-M symbol)
- Space group: P2_{1}/a
- Unit cell: a = 10.541(5), b = 4.646(4) c = 9.324(5) [Å]; β = 100.52°; Z = 2

Identification
- Color: Apple-green to bright green
- Crystal habit: Tabular crystals; massive, granular
- Cleavage: Cleavage: perfect on {001}, indistinct on {100}
- Mohs scale hardness: 3.5
- Luster: Vitreous, pearly on cleavage
- Streak: Pale greenish white
- Diaphaneity: Translucent
- Specific gravity: 3.12–3.19
- Optical properties: Biaxial (+)
- Refractive index: n_{α} = 1.650 - 1.653 n_{β} = 1.669 - 1.675 n_{γ} = 1.688 - 1.697
- Birefringence: δ = 0.038 - 0.044
- 2V angle: Measured: 82°

Ludlamite is a rare phosphate mineral with chemical formula (Fe,Mn,Mg)_{3}(PO_{4})_{2}·4H_{2}O. It was first described in 1877 for an occurrence in Wheal Jane mine in Cornwall, England and named for English mineralogist Henry Ludlam (1824–1880).

== Occurrence ==
It occurs in granite pegmatites and as a hydrothermal alteration product of earlier phosphate bearing minerals in a reducing environment. It occurs associated with whitlockite, vivianite, triploidite, triplite, triphylite, siderite, phosphoferrite, fairfieldite and apatite.
