= Stari Trg mine =

Mine in Kosovo

- Interactive map of Stari Trg mine
- Location: Leposavić, District of Mitrovica, Kosovo
- Products: Lead, Zinc, Silver
- Company: Trepča Kosova

The Stari Trg mine (Serbian: Рудник Стари Трг, Rudnik Stari Trg) is one of the largest lead and zinc mines in Kosovo. The mine is located in Mitrovicë. The mine has reserves amounting to 0.432 million tonnes of ore grading 5.1% lead, 2.21% zinc and 80.5gr/t silver thus resulting 22,000 tonnes of lead, 9,600 tonnes of zinc and 35 tonnes of silver. The 1989 Kosovo miners' strike took place and ended in the mine, and spread to the entire Kosovo as a general strike. In order to stop the strike, turning into an open unrest, the Yugoslav government decided to impose martial law in the region.
