= Trepča, Montenegro =

Trepča Трепча
- Village
- Location within Montenegro
- Coordinates: 42.778288°N 19.814763°E
- Country: Montenegro
- Municipality: Andrijevica

Population (2023)
  - Total: 165
- Time zone: UTC+1 (CET)
  - Summer (DST): UTC+2 (CEST)

Trepča (Serbian Cyrillic: Трепча) is a village in the municipality of Andrijevica, Montenegro.

== Demographics ==
According to the 2023 census, it had a population of 165 people.

Ethnicity in 2011
Ethnicity	Number	Percentage
Serbs	135	64.6%
Montenegrins	39	18.7%
other/undeclared	35	16.7%
Total	209	100%
