= Monuments in Mitrovica =

Mitrovica is one of the oldest settlements in Kosovo and a very important urban ensemble. There are many traces which have special interest and prove early civilization of the territory of Mitrovica, in particular from the Illyrian inhabitation in antiquity.

On the last Provisional List of Cultural Heritage under protection, signed by the Minister of Culture, Youth, and Sport, Memli Krasniqi, in October 2013, there are 1428 heritage assets in Kosovo, 126 of which are in the Mitrovica region. Because of the institution's negligence and the situation after the war, some of the monuments were seriously damaged.

== Medieval monuments ==
=== Rashan Fortress ===
See also: Rashan Fortress

The Fortress of Rashan is located about 5 km (3 mi) as the crow flies from Mitrovica. It was built around the 5th or 4th century BC and was used to protect the mines of the region.

=== Zvečan Fortress ===
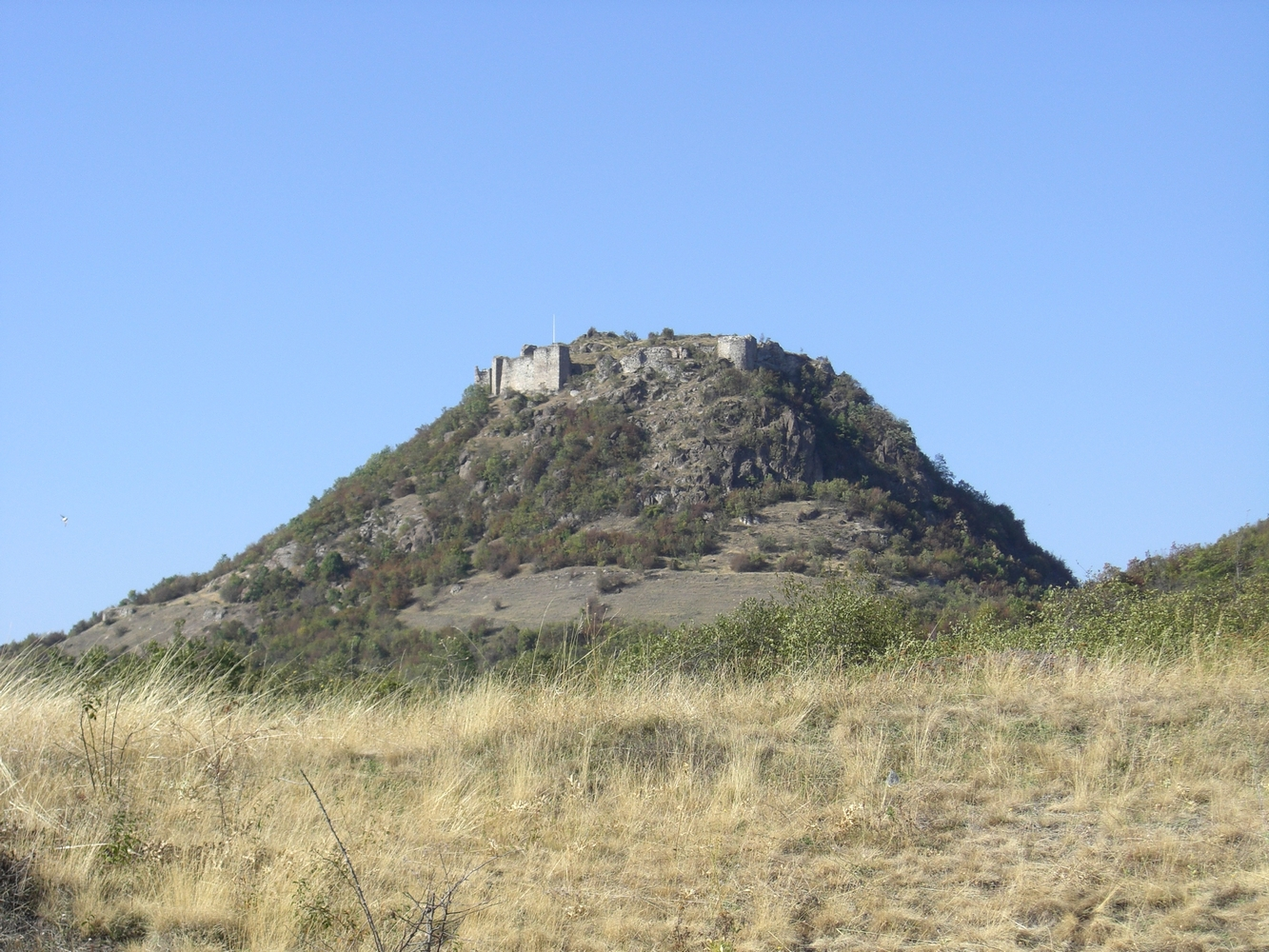
Zvečan Fortress overview

Zvečan Fortress is located in the north-west side of Mitrovica in a very strategic position. It is one of the most ancient forts built on a high volcanic hill, at an altitude of 797 meters above sea level, and is considered to have extraordinary archaeological, architectural, historical and cultural heritage value. It is mentioned for the first time in historical sources by the Byzantine chronicler and historian Anna Komnene in 1092 as a Byzantine castle. The medieval fortress of Zvecan was built on the top of the remains of a fortification dating back to the 4th century AD. The fortress has its beginnings in prehistory, with continuing development through Byzantine, Slav and Ottoman periods.

As a border fort of Grand Principality of Serbia, the site gained importance in 1093, when the Serbian ruler Vukan Vukanović, launched his conquest of Kosovo (then part of the Byzantine Empire) from there. Part of the fortress was designated as one of the courts of the Serbian House of Nemanjić, and it was the place where Stefan Uroš III died in 1331. In 1389, it was captured by the Ottoman Turks after the Battle of Kosovo, and it remained an active military site well into the 18th century, after which it was abandoned.

The fortress is enormous and has three sub-complexes:

- The citadel on the top of the hill
- A belt of protecting enforced walls with towers underneath
- The wall that protected the square under the fortress

Whereas the citadel is composed of two complexes, an upper and lower fortress. The fortress compromises a number of architectural phases.

Its condition is very bad because of the lack of maintenance.

=== Banjska Monastery ===
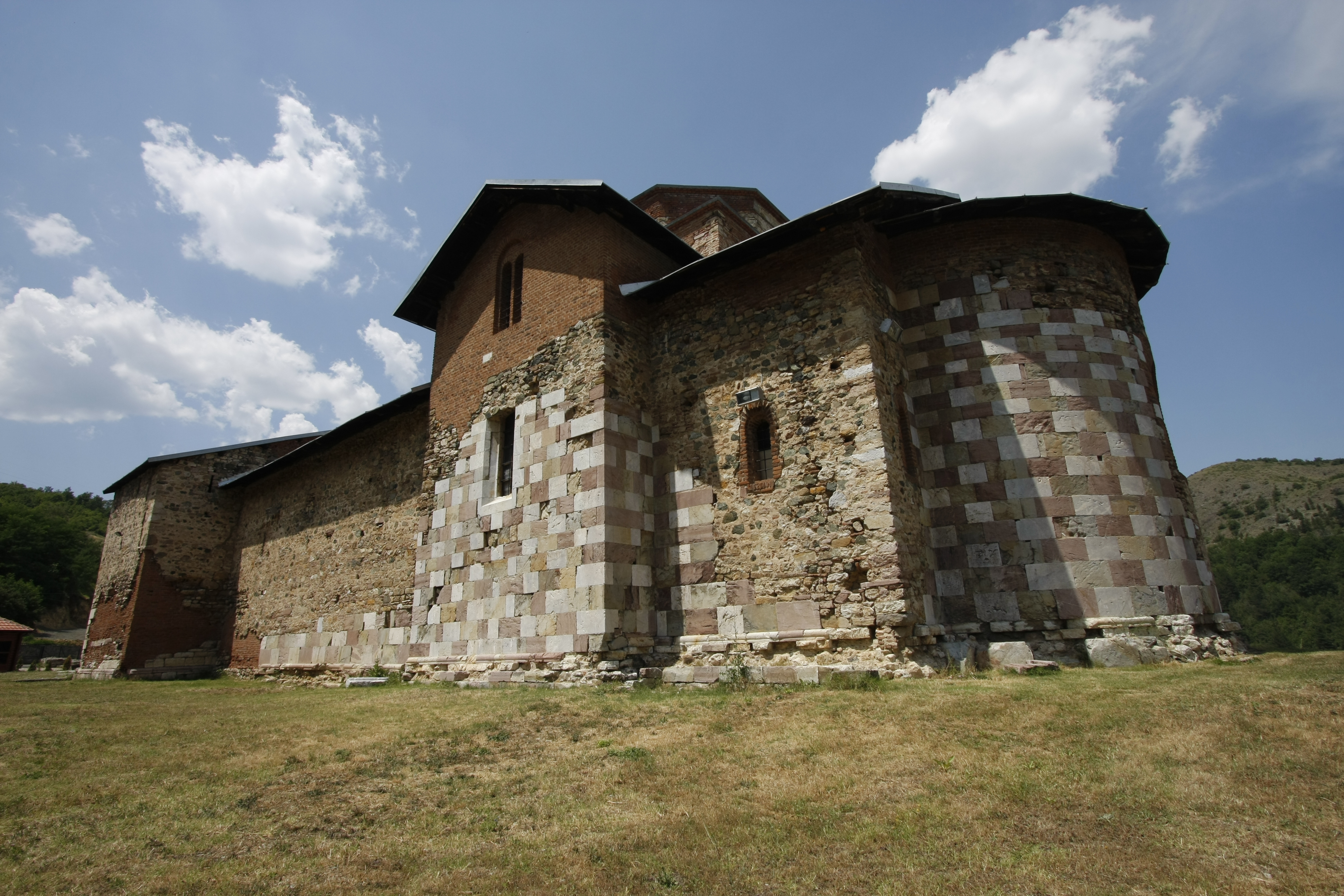
Banjska Monastery

The Banjska Monastery was built between 1312 and 1316 in Banjska village by King Milutin on the site of an older paleo-Christian building. The monastery was supposed to be the burial place of the king, but in 1389 the relics were transferred to Trepca and later in 1445 to Sofia, Bulgaria where they reside today. The church was dedicated to Saint Stephen and has western influences with three-colored stones. The design was done by Fra Vita from Kotor who also designed the Visoki Dečani Monastery. The sculpture of the Sokolica Virgin, has been moved to Sokolica Monastery. A major restoration of the monastery began in July 2003 and because of the earlier reconstructions the appearance has changed. The monastery was used for two purposes, as a mausoleum and as a donation. It is a protected monument by the Republic of Kosovo with the status number 0301-551/90.

=== St. Peter's Basilica Church (Saxon's or Latin Church) ===
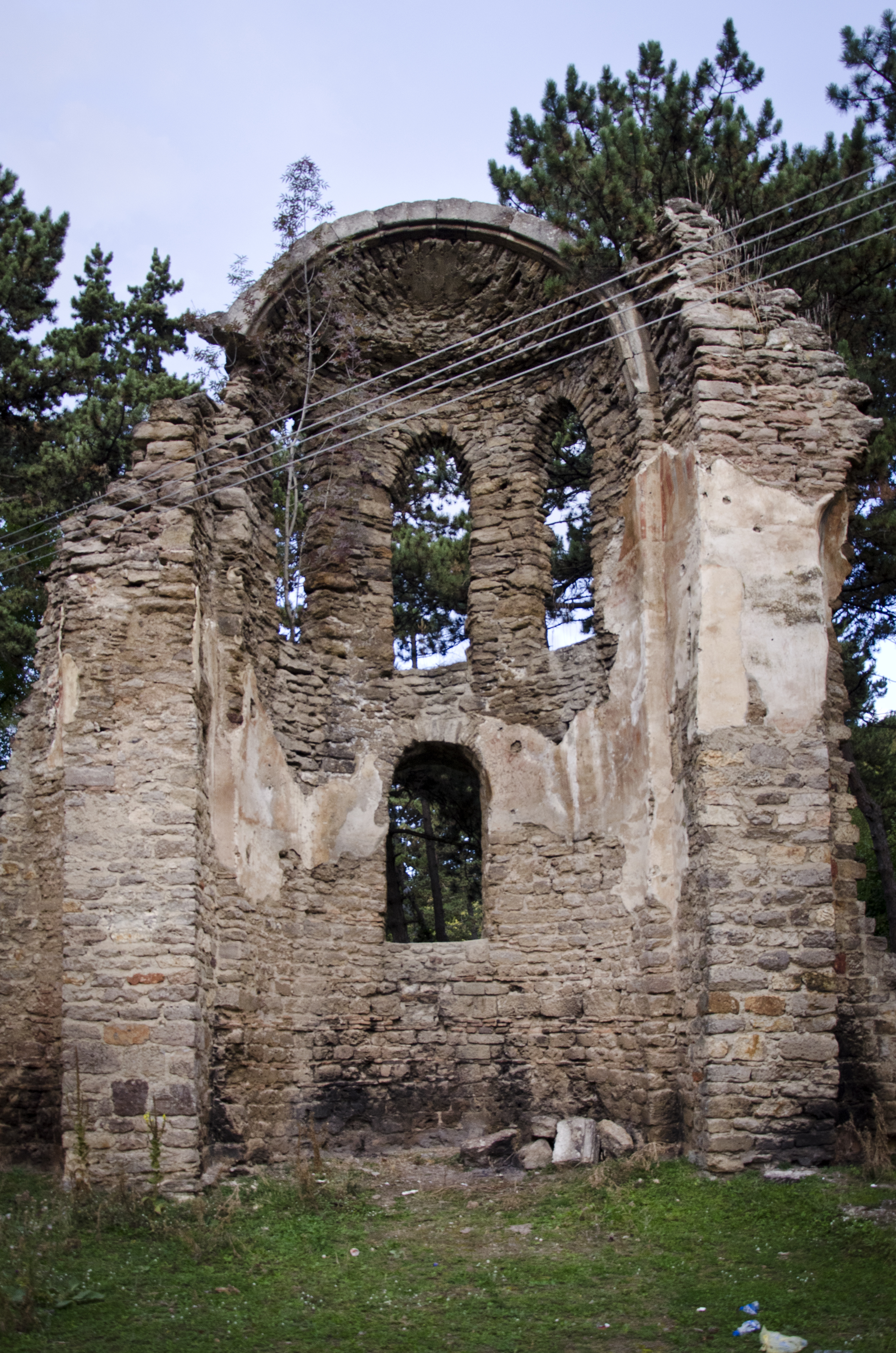
St.Peter's Basilica Church

St. Peter's Basilica Church, also known as Saxon's Church and Latin Church, dates to the 13th century. It was built for the Saxon miners and Catholic merchants and was used until the 16th century. The remains of the church are located in the old city of Stari Terg. St. Peter's Church, a three nave basilica, is of particular interest because of its gothic architectural style and construction techniques, as well as for the Byzantine mural paintings, which decorate the interior. Currently, the church is in a state of ruin. Only the foundations in the western part remain, together with the east apse which is partially preserved up to the roof level. Inside the apse, fragments of murals can be seen.

== Ottoman period Islamic monuments ==
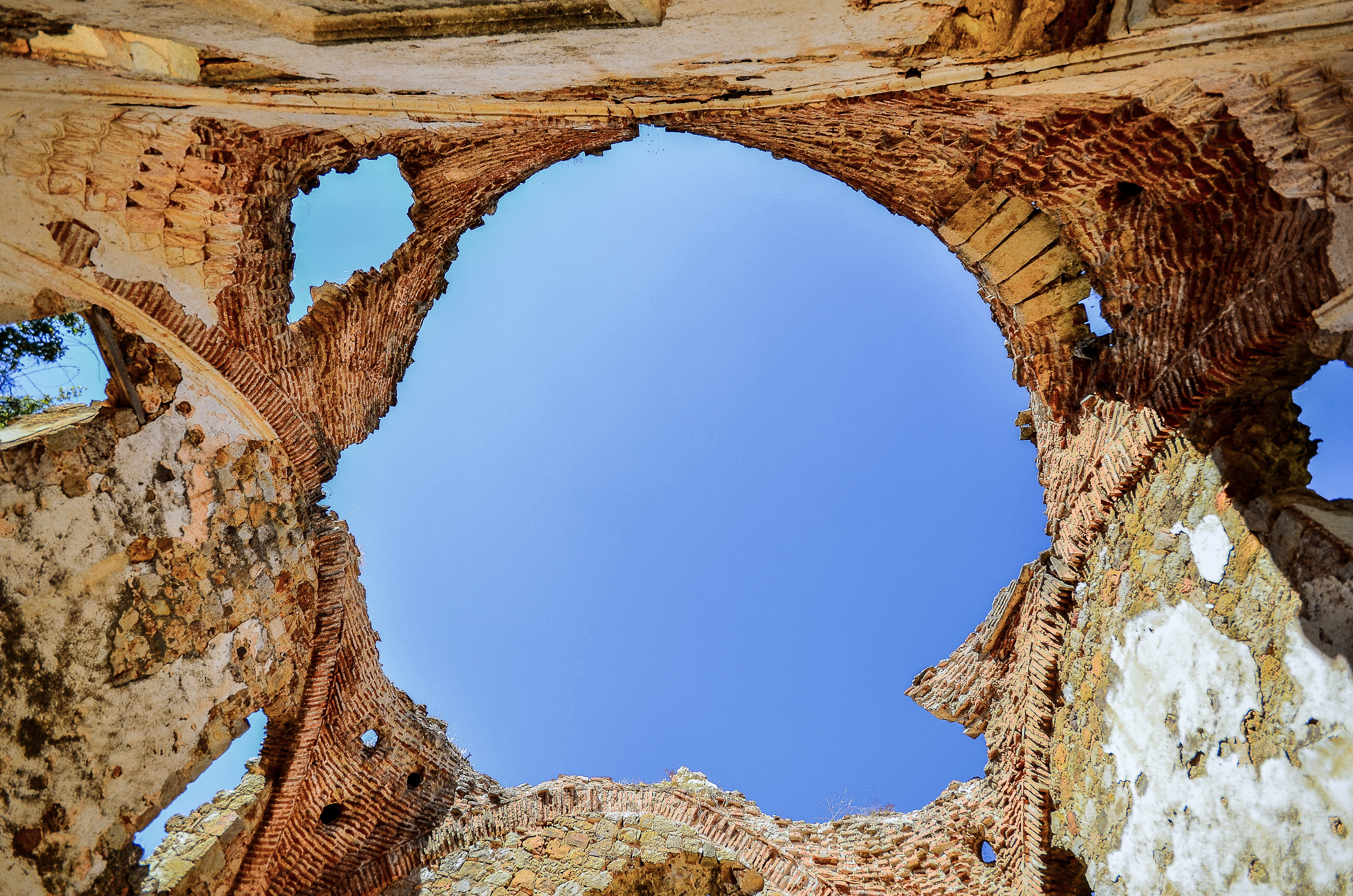
Mazhiq Mosque from the inside

=== Mazhiq Mosque ===
The Mazhiqi Mosque (also known as the Mosque of Mujezin Hoxha) is a very old mosque which was built around the 14th century. It is located 13 km (8 mi) from Mitrovica, in the village of Mazhiq. The mosque is almost fully destroyed, and has lost its original function.

It was built during the rule of the Ottoman Empire.

=== The old city hammam ===
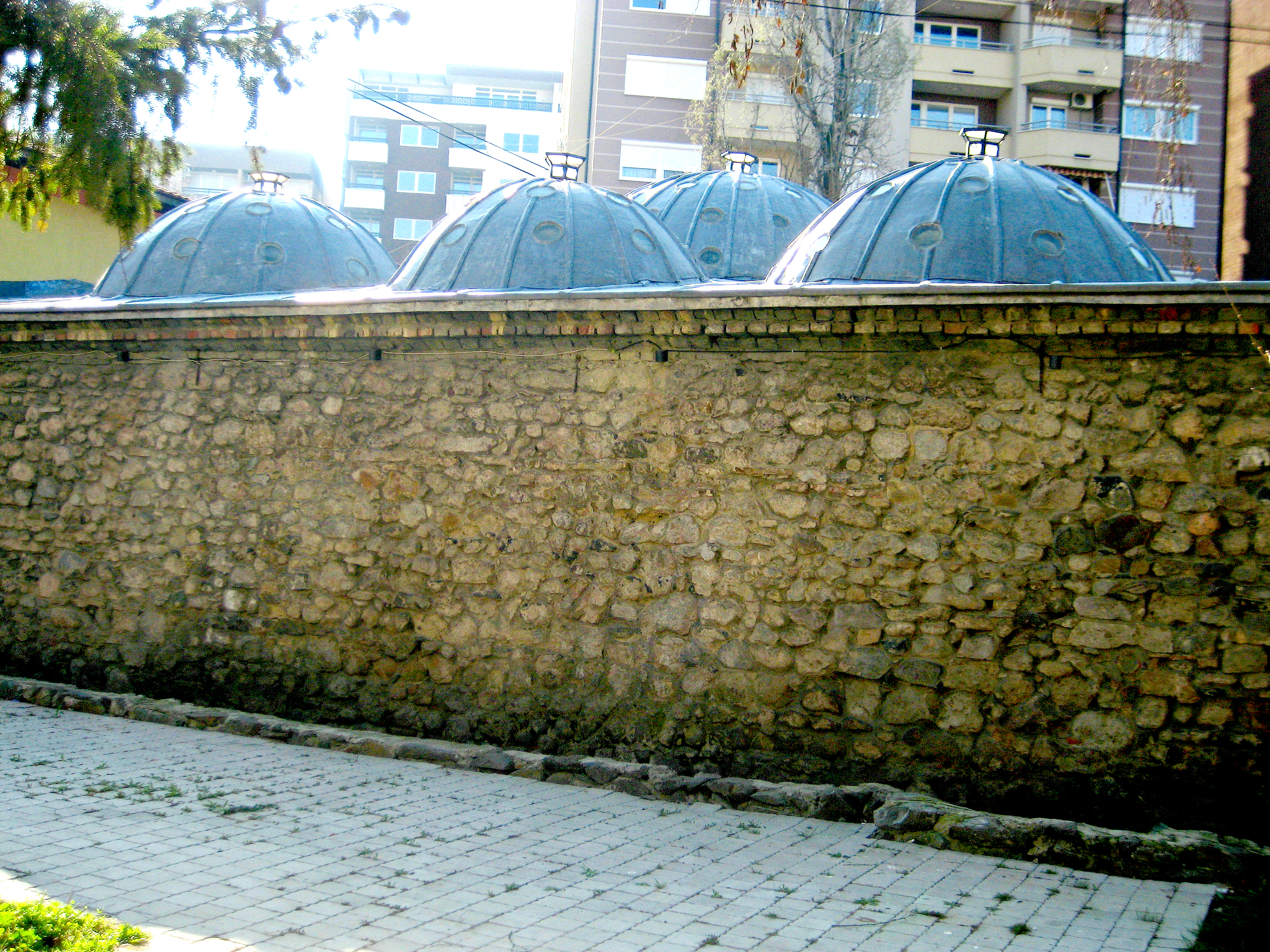
The Building of the Old Hamam in Mitrovica

The Old City Hammam (Turkish bathhouse) building in Mitrovica is representative of the Ottoman architecture in Kosovo. It was constructed in oriental style by Sulejman Pashe Berisha and his nephew Zejnullah Beg Berisha in the 18th century. A right-angled annex, 15 m long and 10 m wide was added at the end of the 19th century. It is the only hammam in Kosovo built with familiar budget and not by the government. The roof of the building has nine domes, one big central dome and eight small domes, covered in lead and zinc. At that time, the Turkish bath was an essential part of the city. The building process took two years. Its walls are made of large stones, and the width of the walls is 80 cm (31 in). The first floor is paved with marble and in the center there is a water fountain. The second floor was used to get undressed before going into the hammam. The main part of the hammam has four rooms. A 40-ton boiler was used to supply the rooms with water. The hammam and the annex cover more than 1200 square meters. This space was used by men and women at different times. Men used the bath in the morning from 7 to 10 am and from 11 am to 5 pm it was used by women. Fridays and Sundays were reserved for men. The hammam was also used for weddings and other celebrations. The hammam was functional until May 1959. The monument represents special oriental architecture value and has been protected since 1957. From 1960 to 2009 the building was used as a regional museum with four sectors: archaeology, ethnology, geology and history. In 2009, the museum moved to an ex-army building. From November 2009, the building was returned to the heir of the ex owner and now a part of it operates as a restaurant.

== Vernacular architecture ==
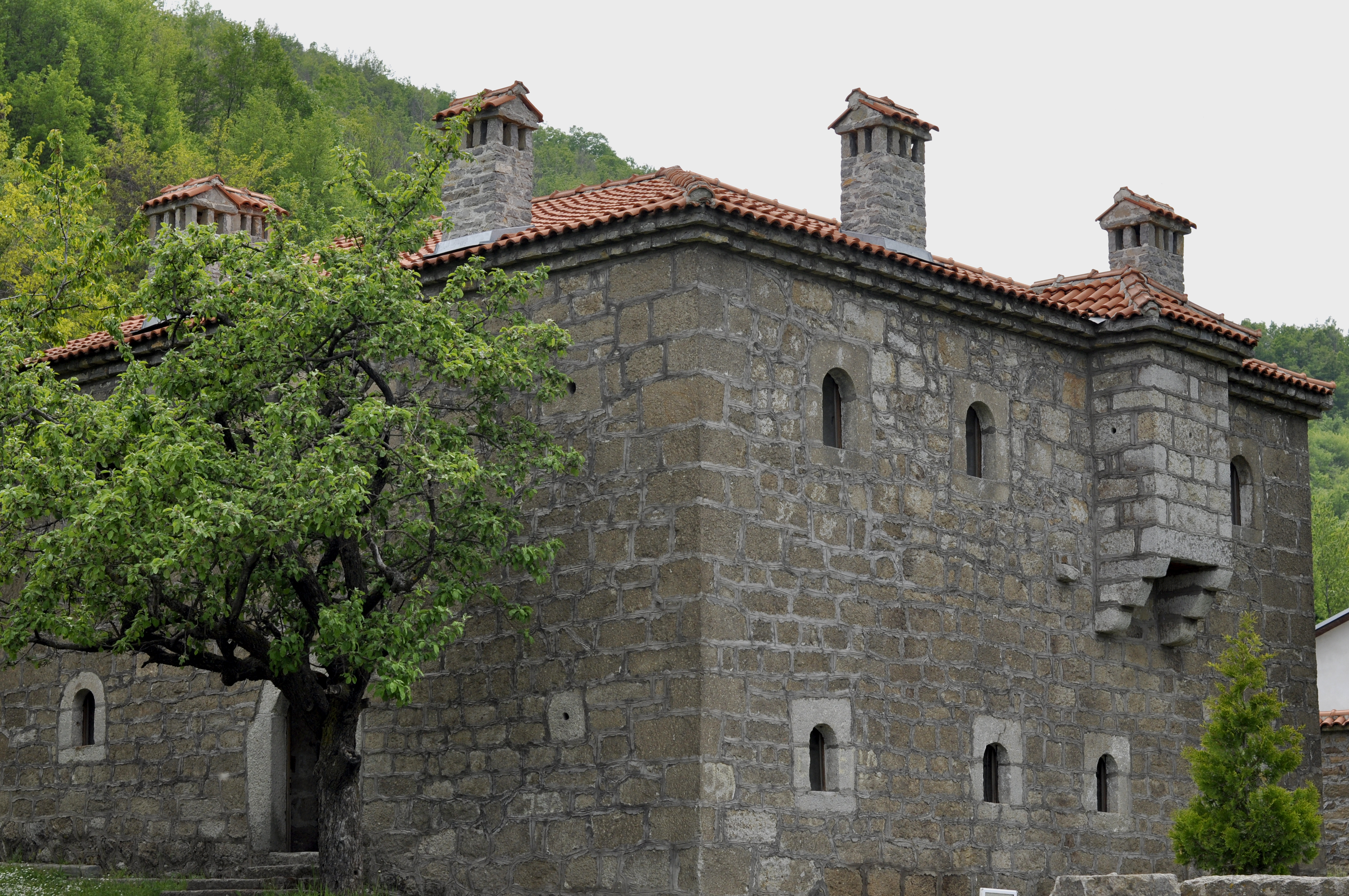
Isa Boletini's tower

=== Isa Boletini towers ===
The two Isa Boletini towers are located in Boletin village. The first tower (men's tower) was built in 1887 by the father of Isa Boletini, Adem Boletini. It was destroyed in 1899 by the Ottoman invaders because Isa had built the first Albanian school on the region. Most of the battles happened in this tower.

The other tower (women's tower) was built in 1912 and is now called the tower of the fire. It was destroyed during the war but in 2004 it was restored inside and outside. The damage on the walls can still be seen. The tower is now used as a museum.

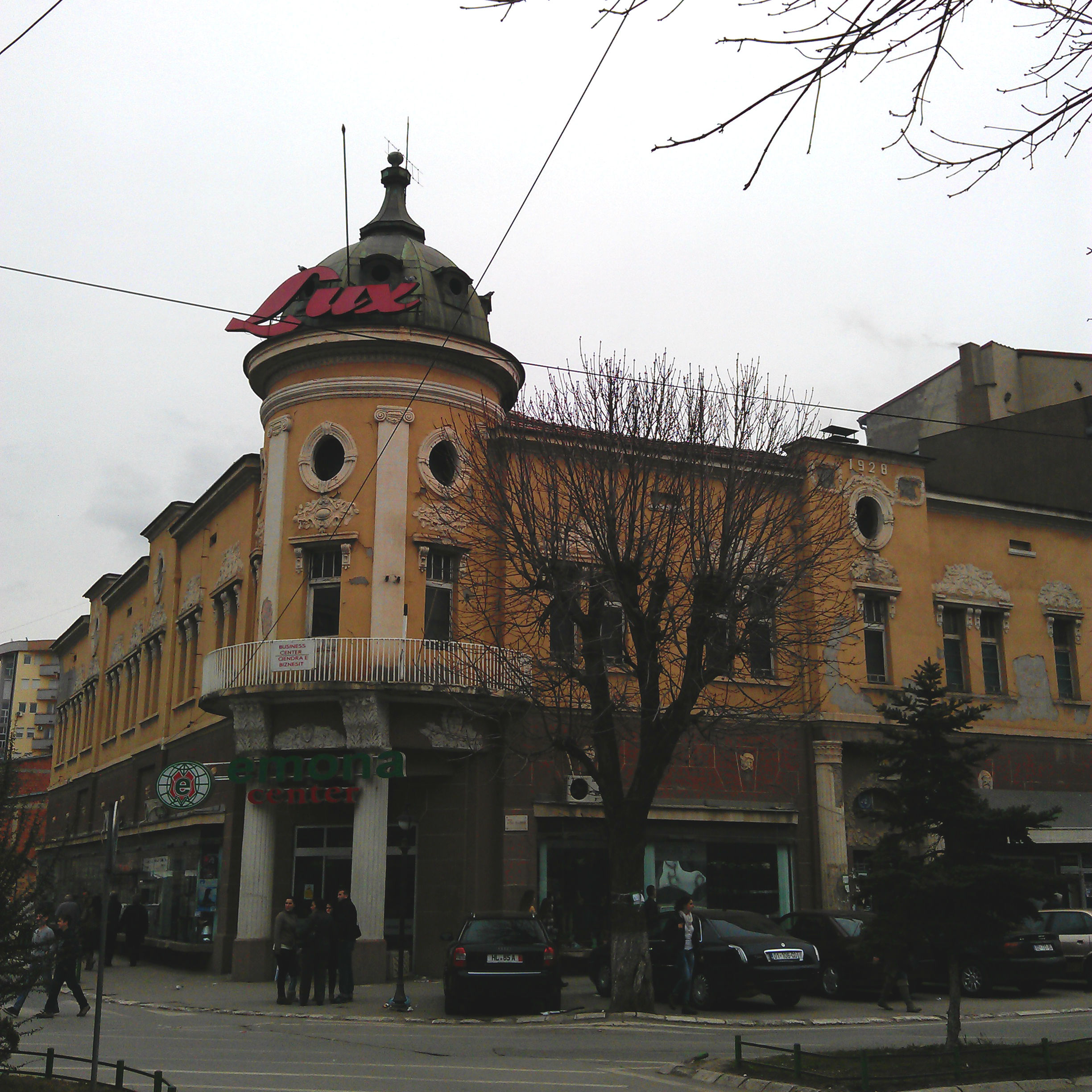
Hotel Jadran building in Mitrovica

=== Former Hotel Jadran building ===
The Hotel Jadran building (which is no longer a hotel) is representative of Mitrovica. It is located in the center of the city, "Adem Jashari" square. This building was built in 1928, an investment of the rich family Žarković from Mitrovica. First, the building operated as a hotel, then as an administrative building of LUX enterprise, and after that as the city library named "Latif Berisha". Today, the building is a private property and the ground floor is used as a grocery store. The building has changed over time and it is in a relatively good condition. This building is very similar to the Hotel Unioni in Pristina.

=== Koroglu family house ===
The traditional Ottoman house of Koroglu (Köroğlu/Qorolli) family is from the mid-19th century. It is located near the old Ottoman city center in the neighborhood that is now known as Kacamak Mahalla. Because of the condition, it is no longer a residence, but the original structure remains. It has been a protected monument since 1978.

=== Xhafer Deva house ===
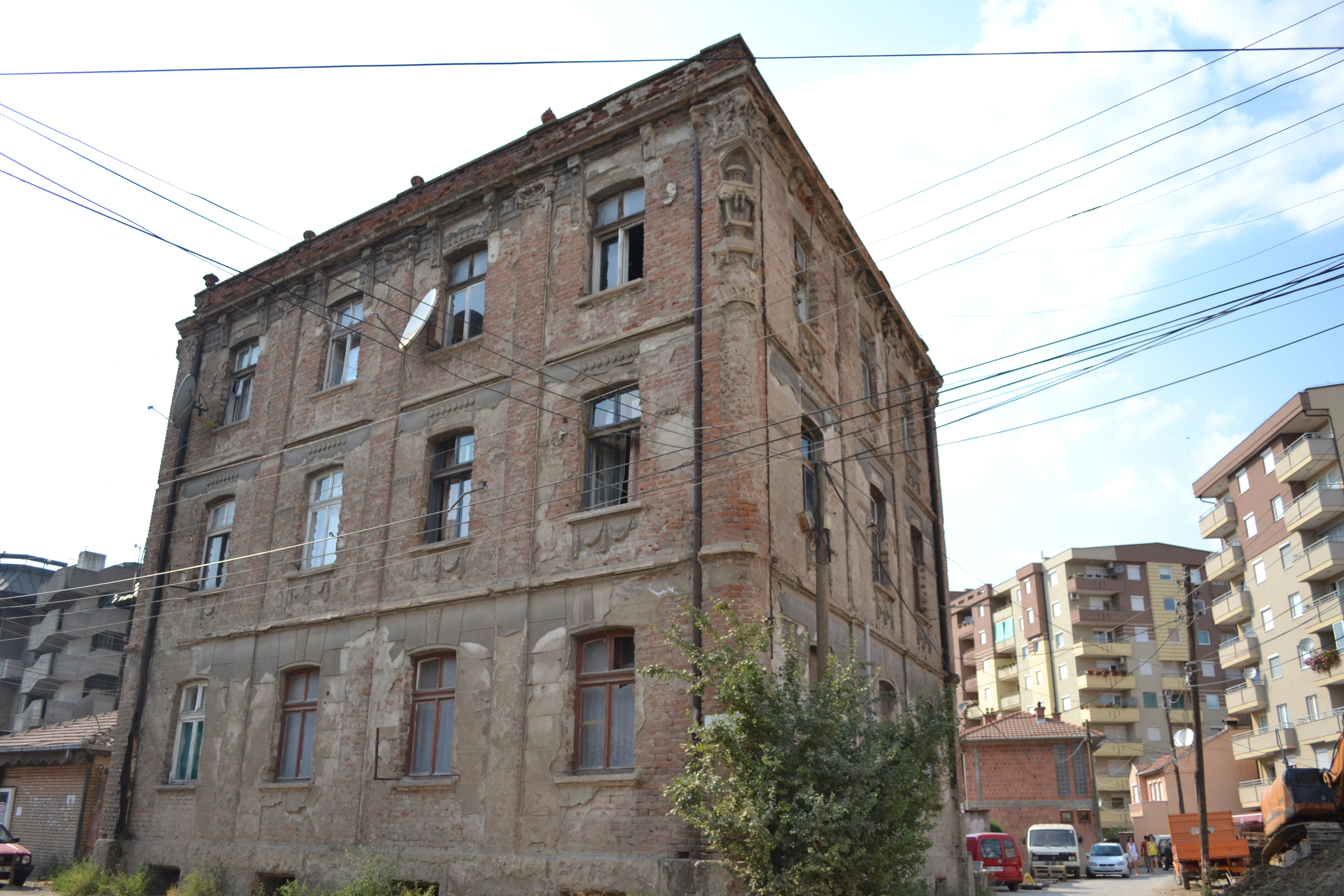
The house of Xhafer Deva (the oldest house in Mitrovica)

Xhafer Deva's house is a building with great architectural and cultural values, it was built in 1930 by Austrian architects and workers. It is a beautiful building. It was owned by Xhafer Deva, the Albanian Minister of Internal Affairs in 1943 and 1944. Until the renovation, the building has been a ruin for decades,

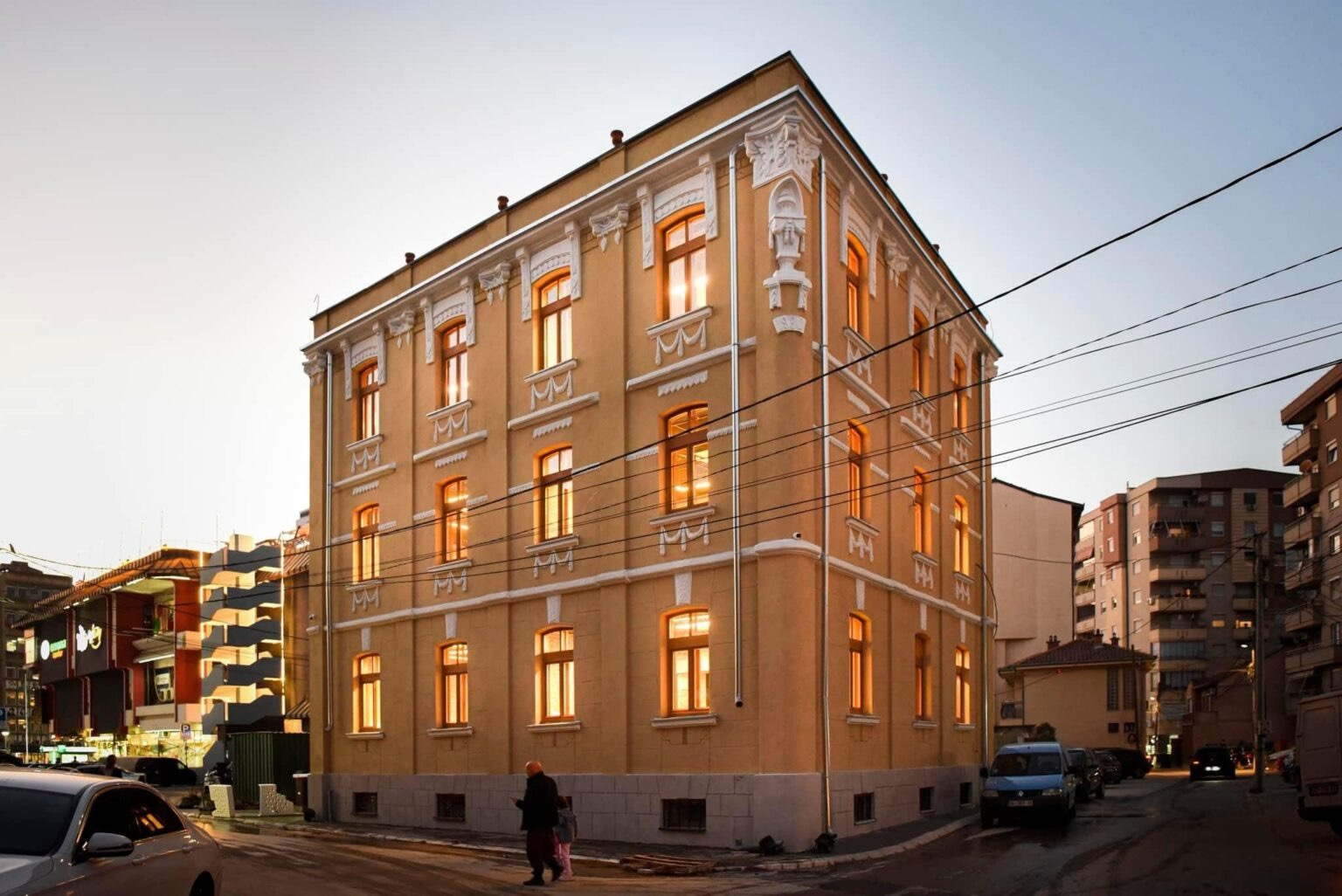
The house of Xhafer Deva after the renovation

Even though it has been declared a cultural monument and despite its architectural and historical value. It was once the pride of Mitrovica. Representatives of the cultural heritage center in Mitrovica plan to restore the building at a cost of about 150,000 euros, after which the cultural heritage center of Mitrovica will be based there, some rooms will turn to a museum for Xhafer Deva and his family, and the municipality will have rooms to host international guests.

The building has been renovated from 2022 to 2024 by the Kurti government at a cost of over half a million euros. Since December 2024, the renovation has been completed and the Minister of Culture Hajrulla Çeku has shared photos on Facebook, presenting the project as one of the successes of the Ministry of Culture, Youth and Sport.

== Modern monuments ==
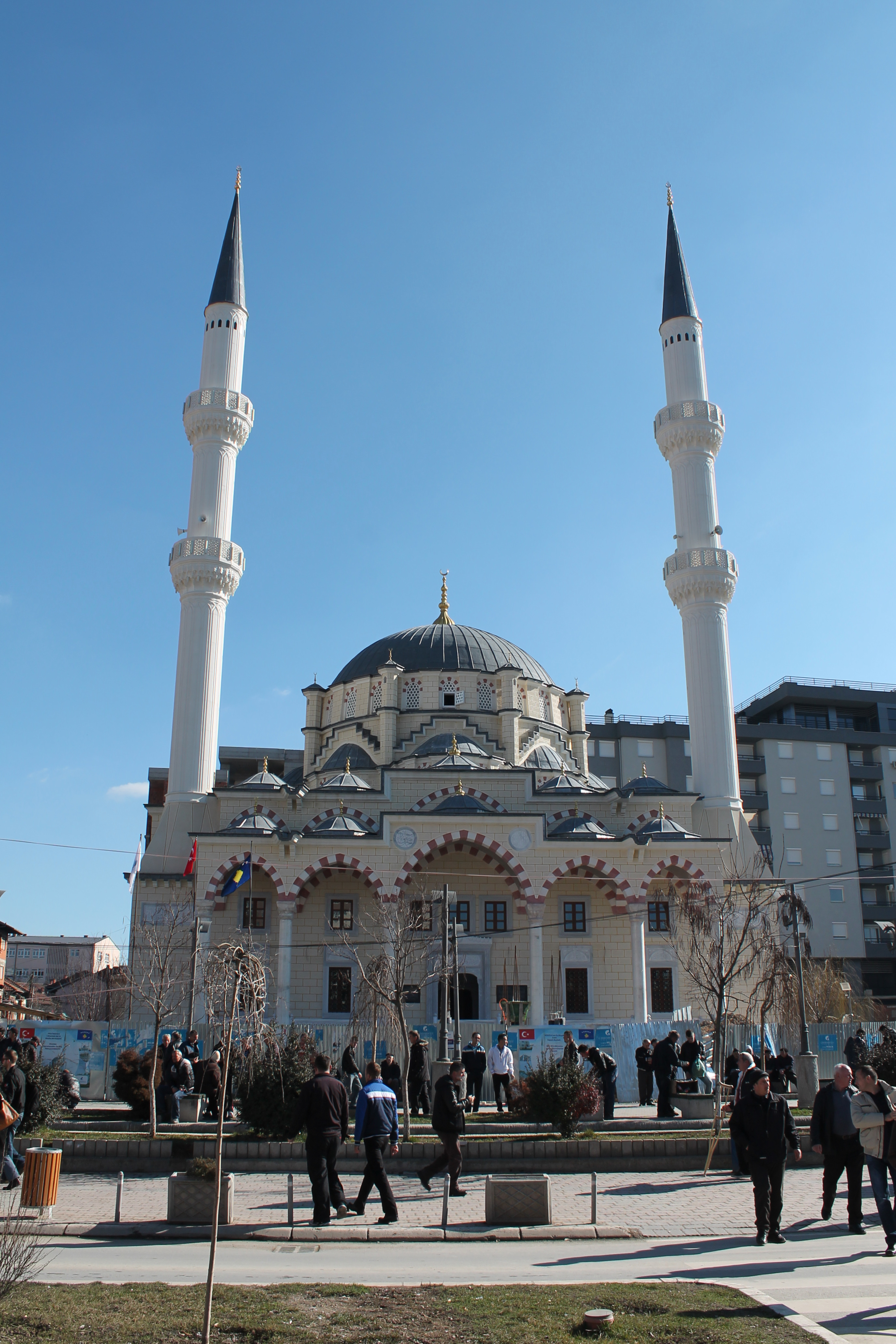
Bayram Paşa Mosque

=== Bajram Pasa Mosque ===
The Bajram Pasa Mosque was donated by the municipality of Bayrampaşa in Istanbul. The mosque is built in the center of the city on the site of the old Isa Beg Mosque, which was in very poor condition after the last war. The mayor of the municipality, Avni Kastrati, gave permission to build the new mosque there. It is the biggest and the most modern mosque in Kosovo. It has 2500 square meters of usable space, including spaces for religious learning.

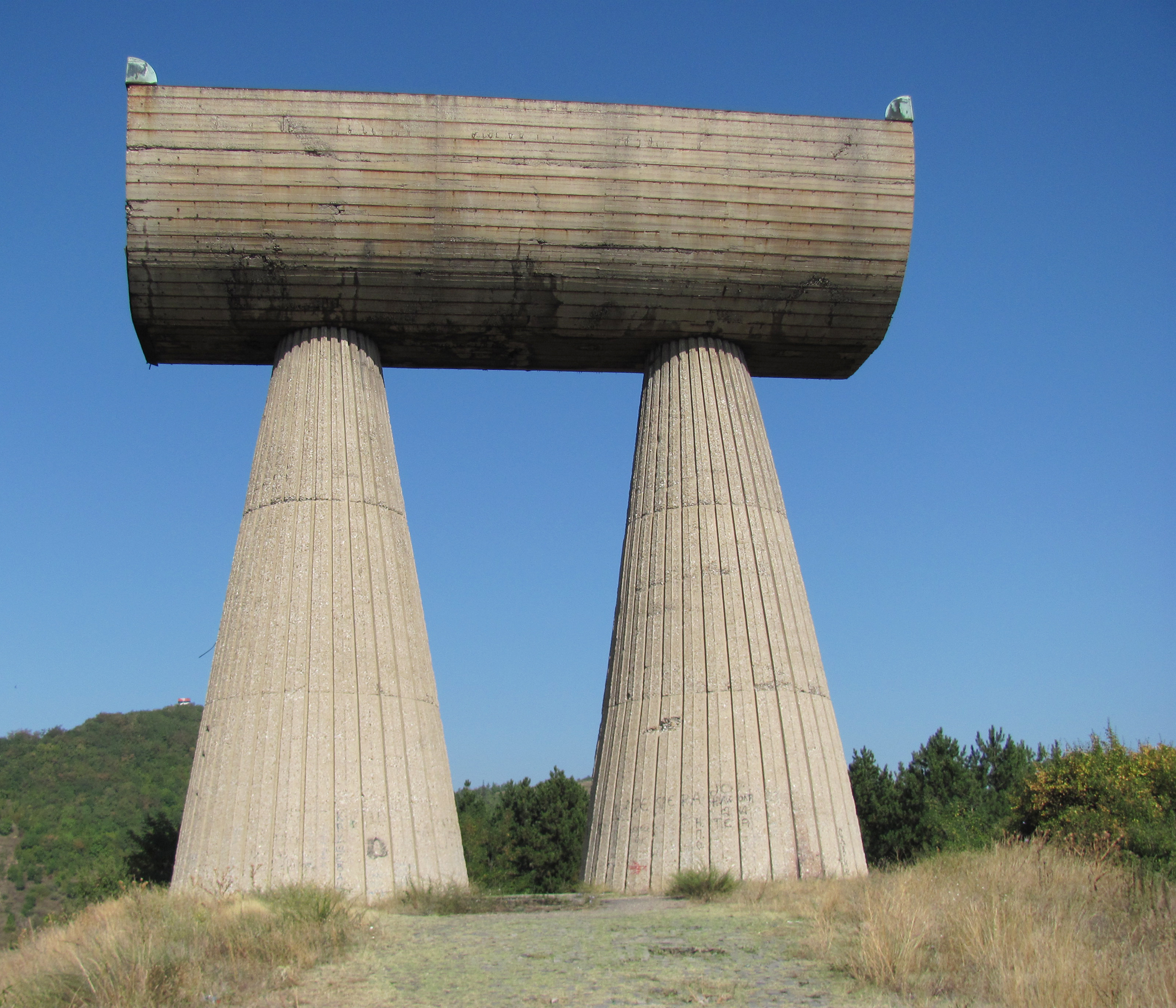
The miners monument

=== Zvecan smelter ===
The smelter was built in 1938 by a British firm Selection Trust Ltd.

=== The miners monument ===
This is the most significant monument in the city. It was built in 1973 by the architect Bogdan Bogdanović. It is perched on the so-called miners hill in northern Mitrovica. Two columns holding a mining cart represent the mining tradition of the city. Mitrovica is well known for its Trepča Mines. The monument was dedicated to the miners of the city (Albanian and Serbian partisans), who lost their lives during World War II. It was designed to represent the overcoming of national divisions between Albanians and Serbs and to bear witness to the peaceful coexistence between the two communities in post-war Yugoslavia. Now the monument has lost its meaning and it can be seen as an object of indifference on both sides of the city.

== Gallery ==
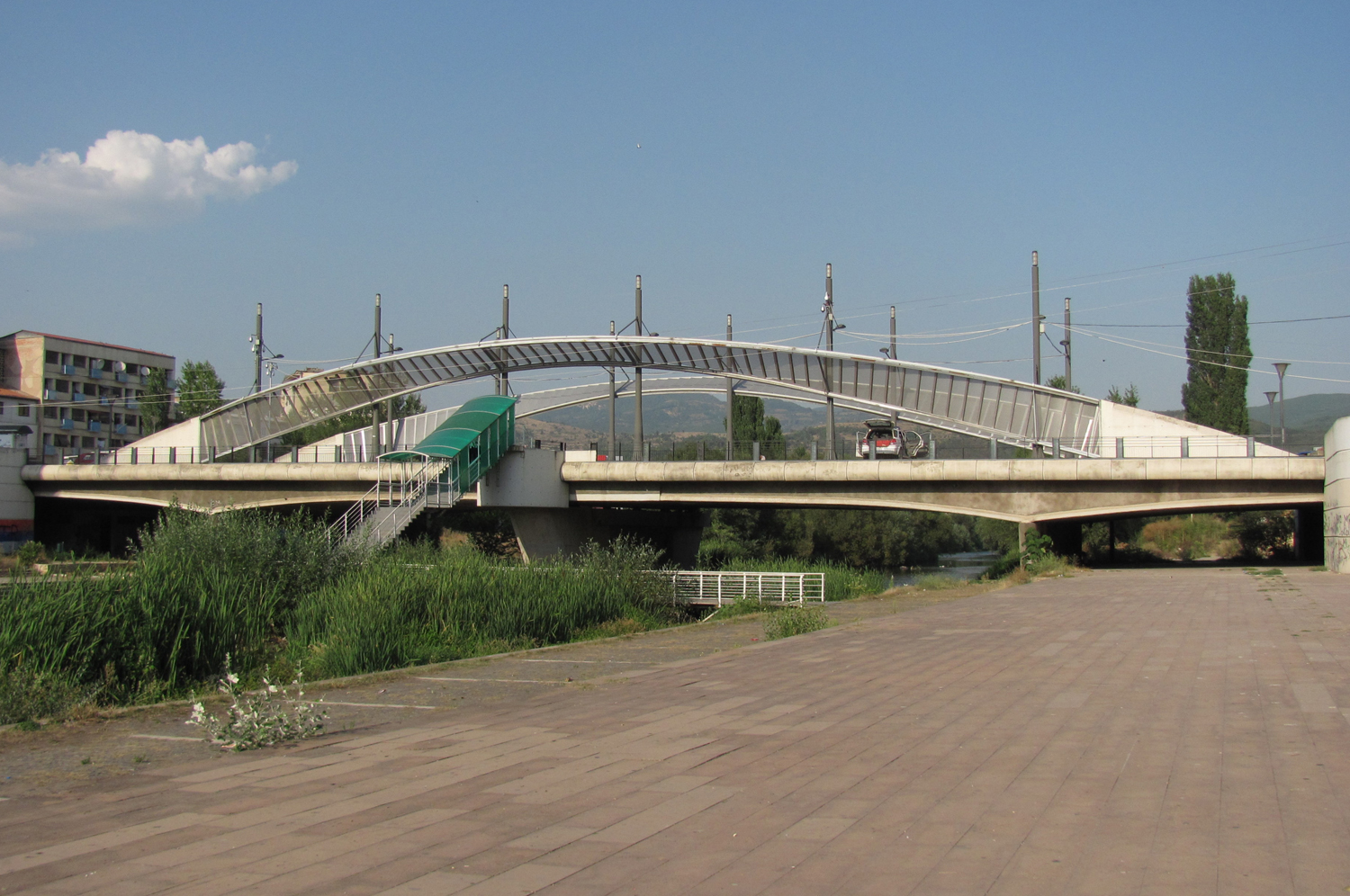
Main bridge in Mitrovica

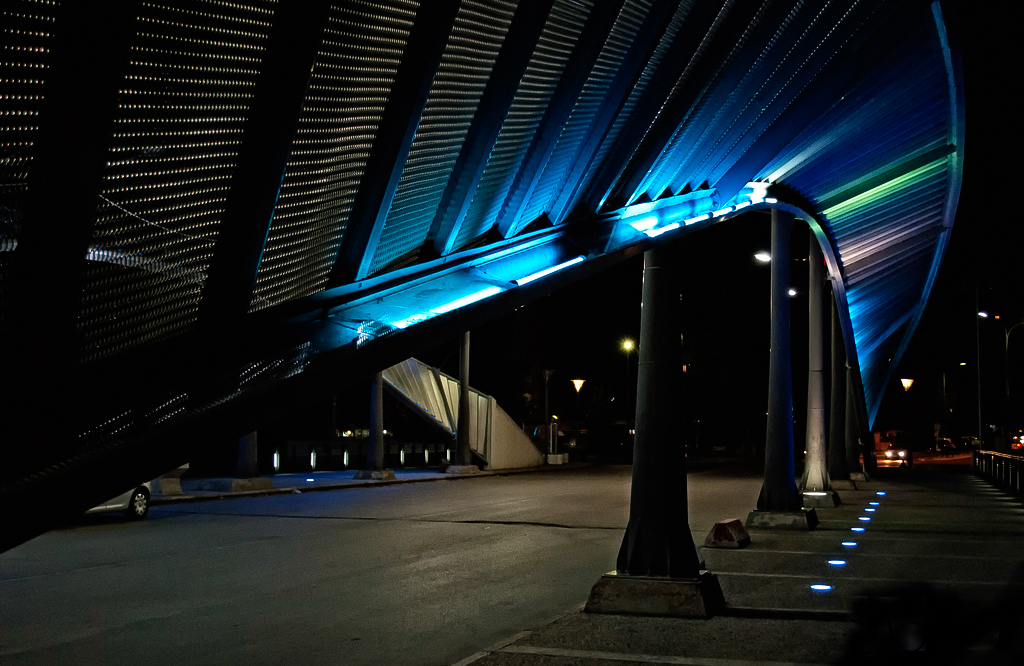
Main bridge over Ibar river

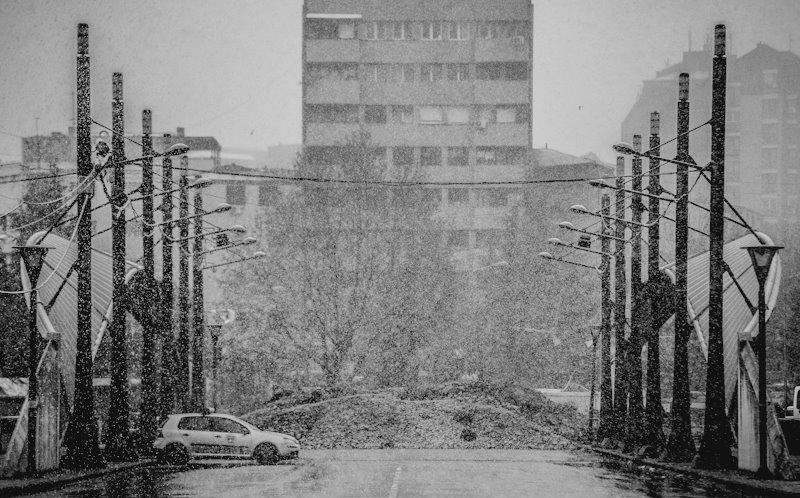
Snow on the main bridge in Mitrovica

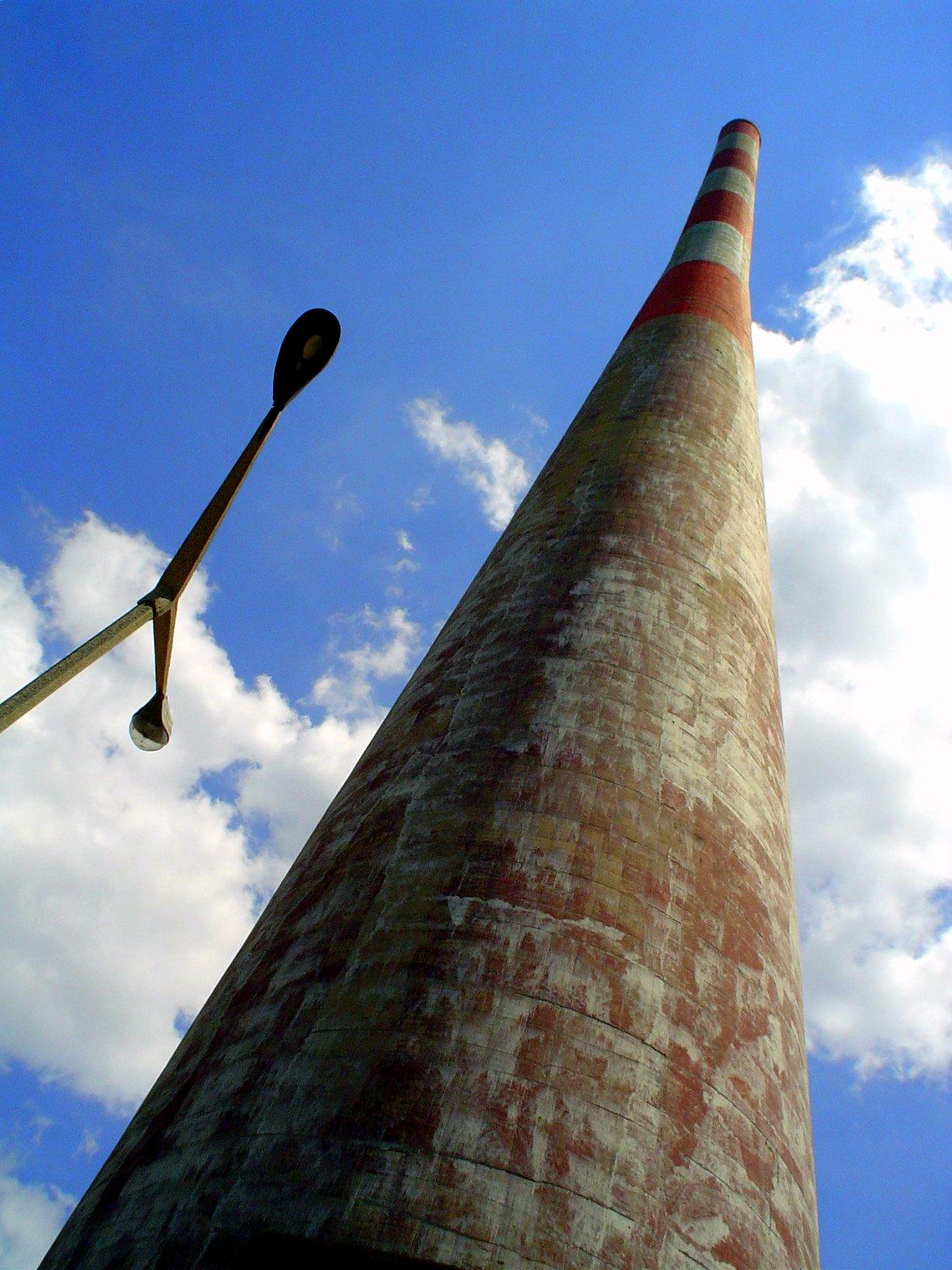
Zvečan lead smelter chimney

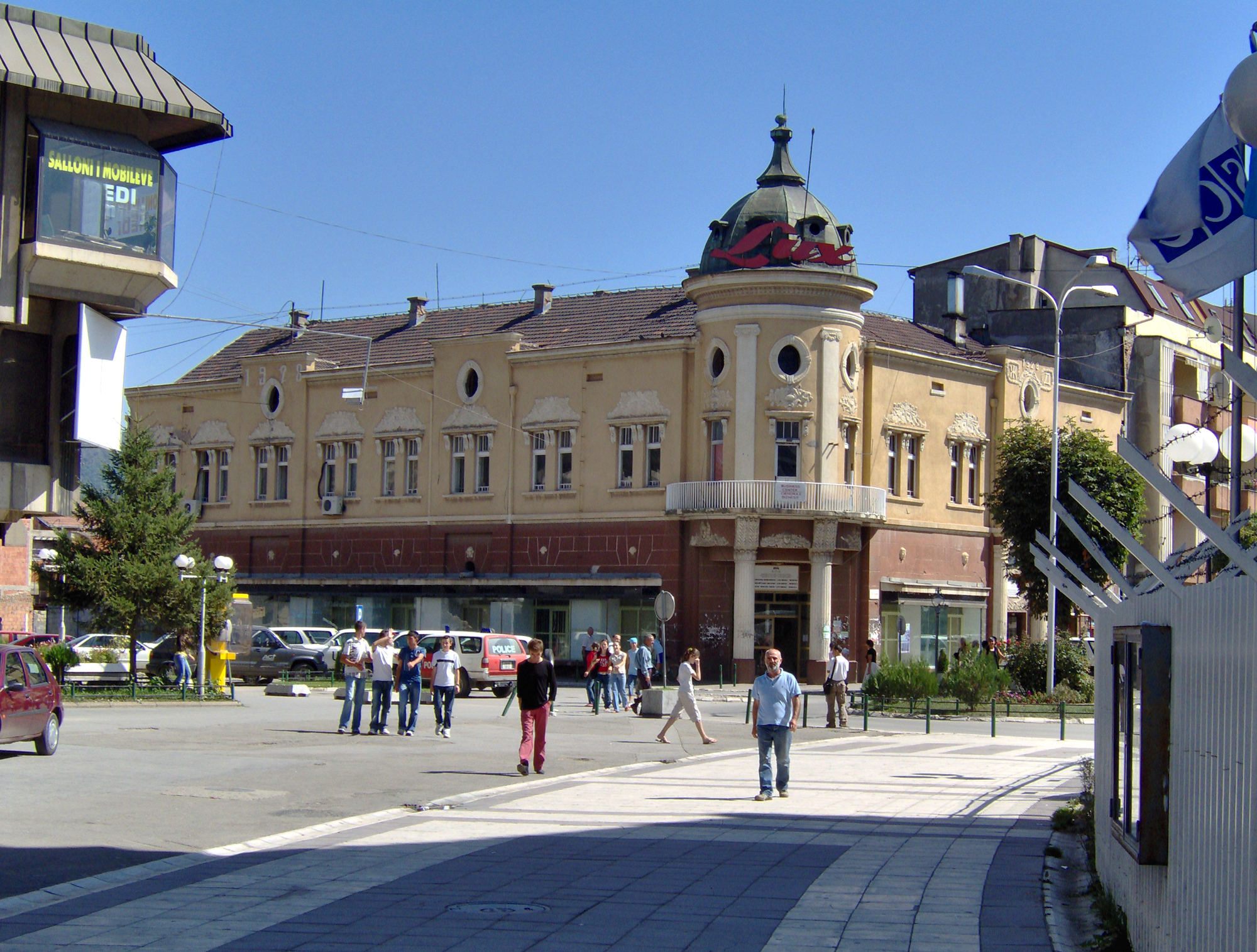
Former Hotel Jadran building

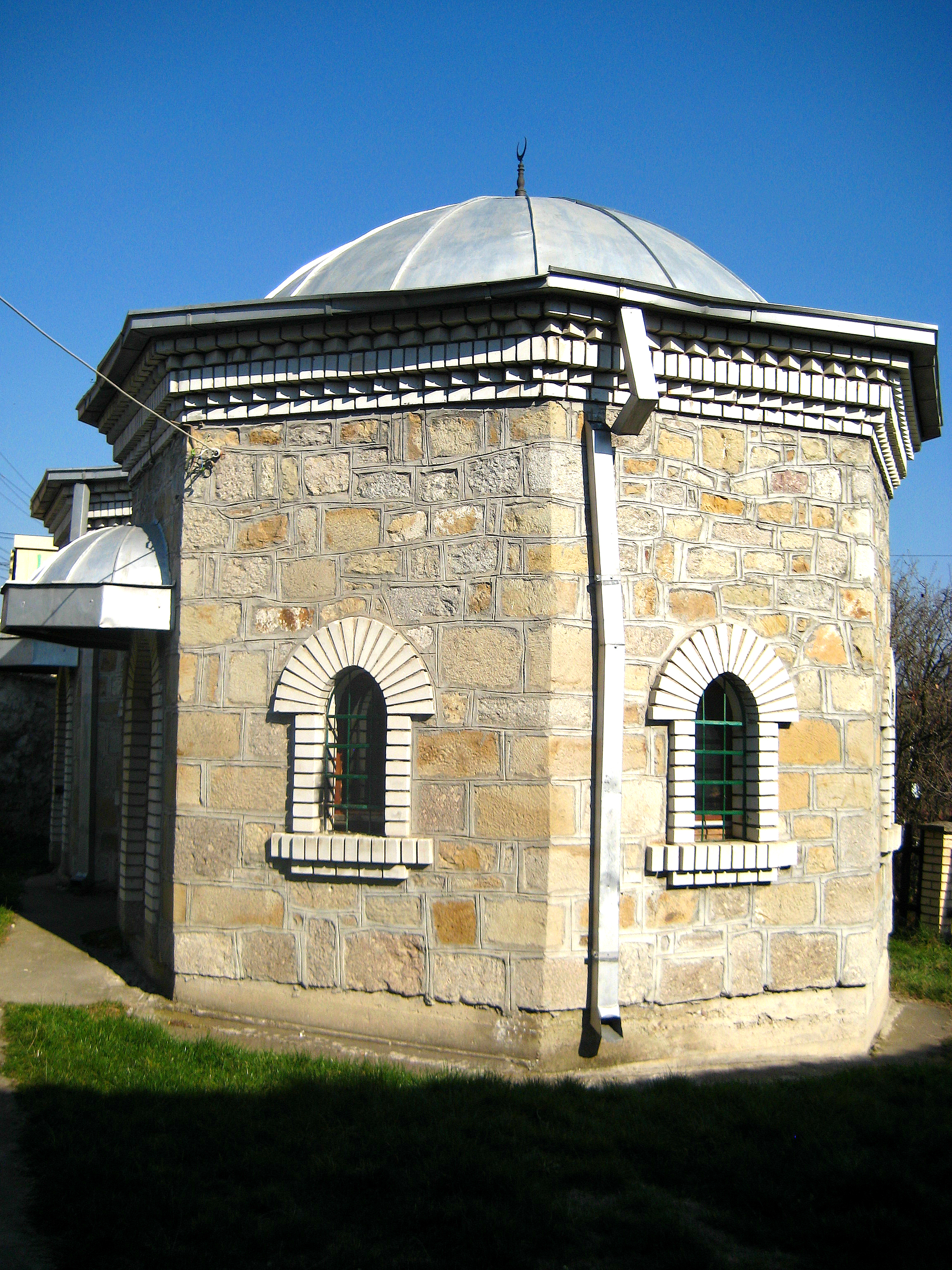
Jonuz Efendi masjid

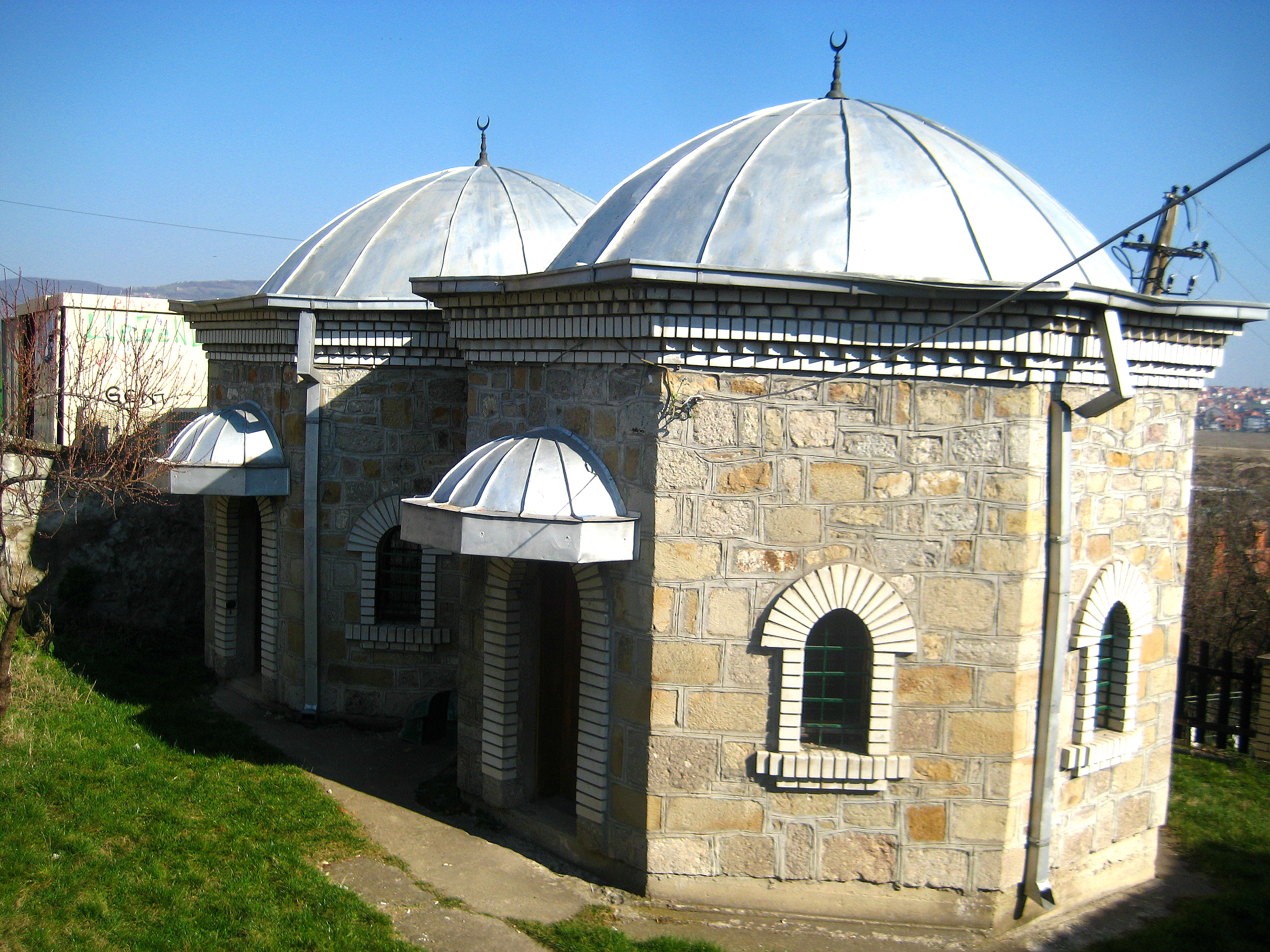
Jonuz Efendi masjid

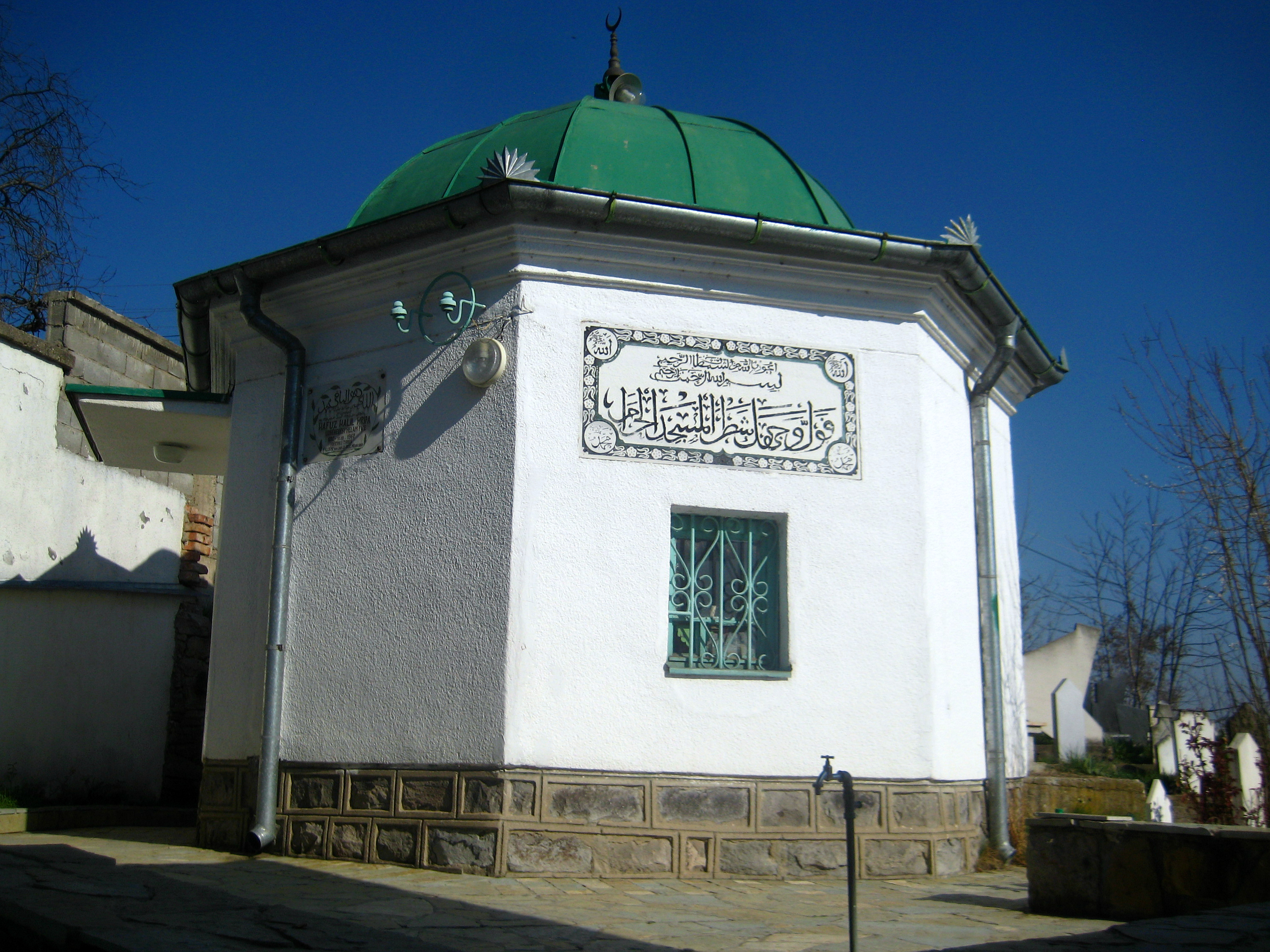
Hafuz Halil Mripa masjid

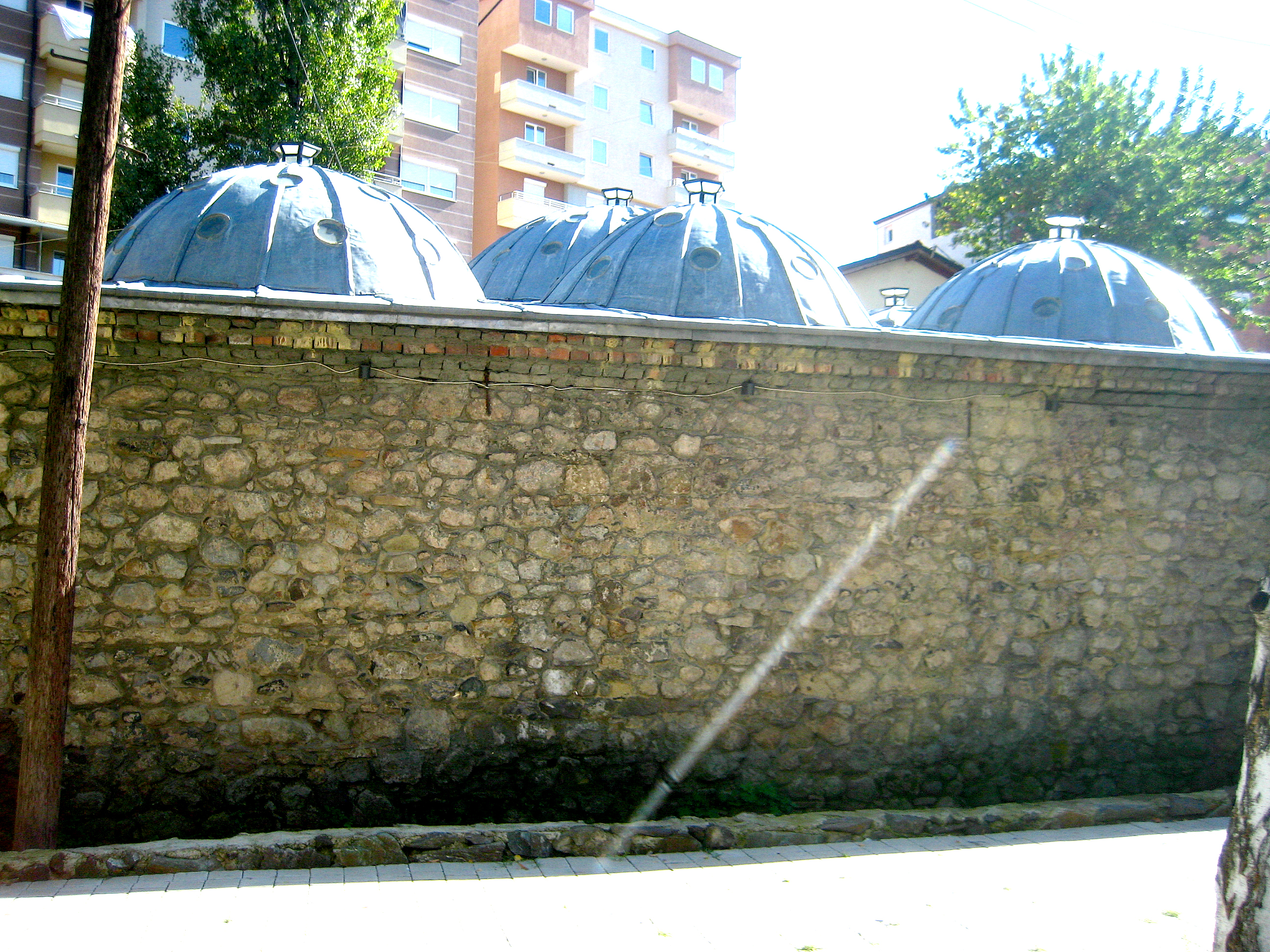
The Building of the Old Hamam in Mitrovica

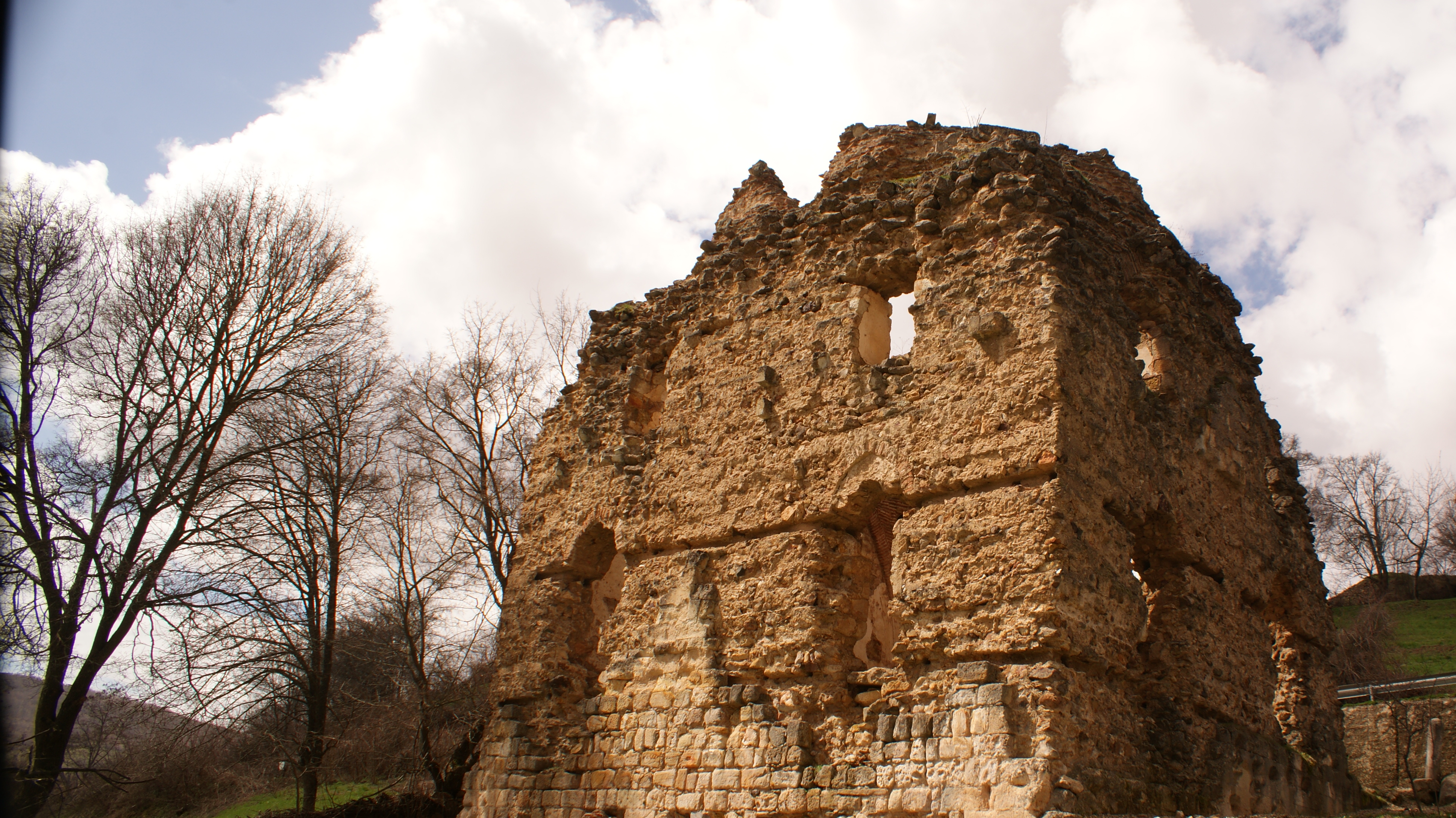
Mazhiqi Mosque.

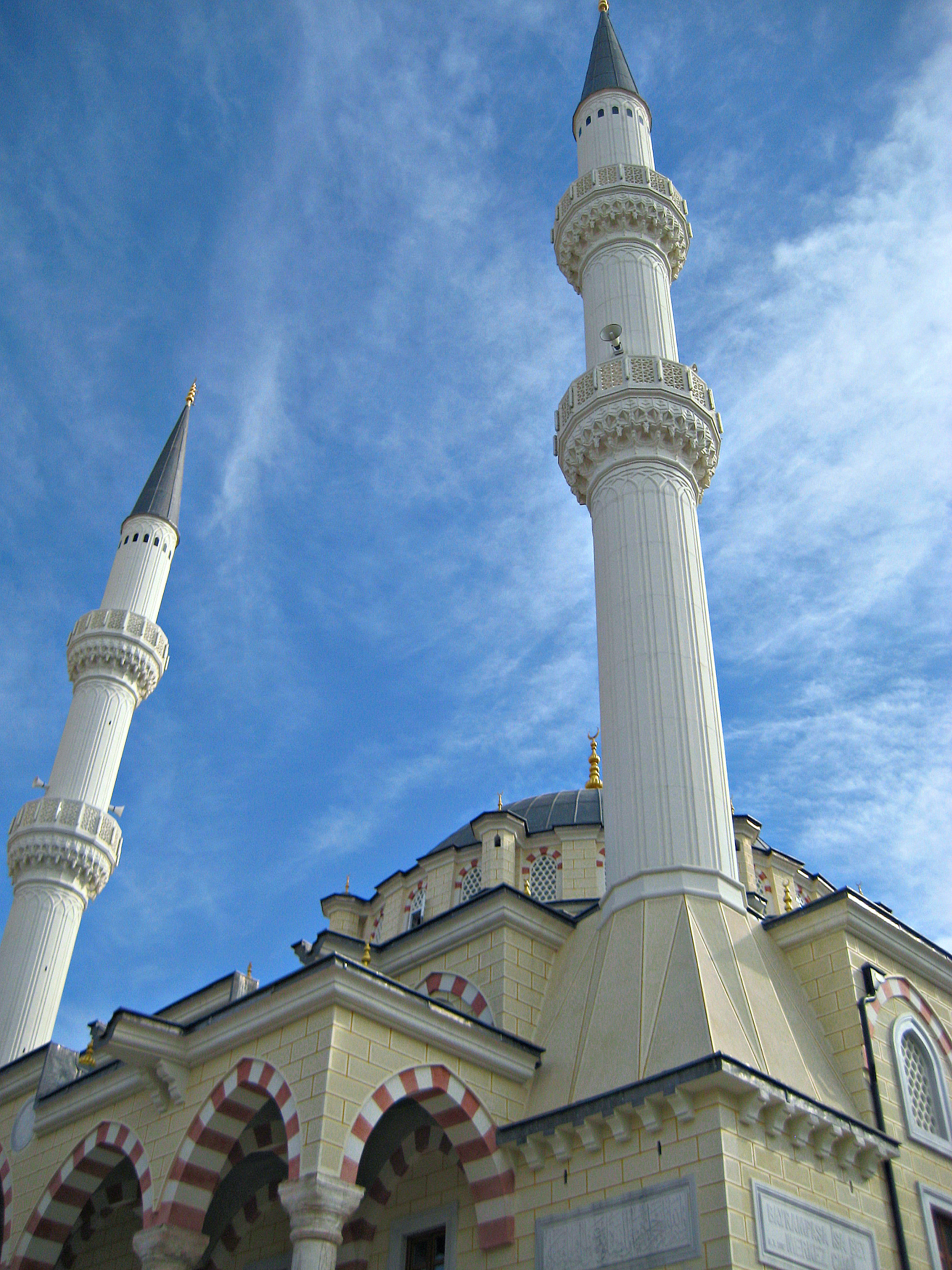
Bajram Pasa Mosque

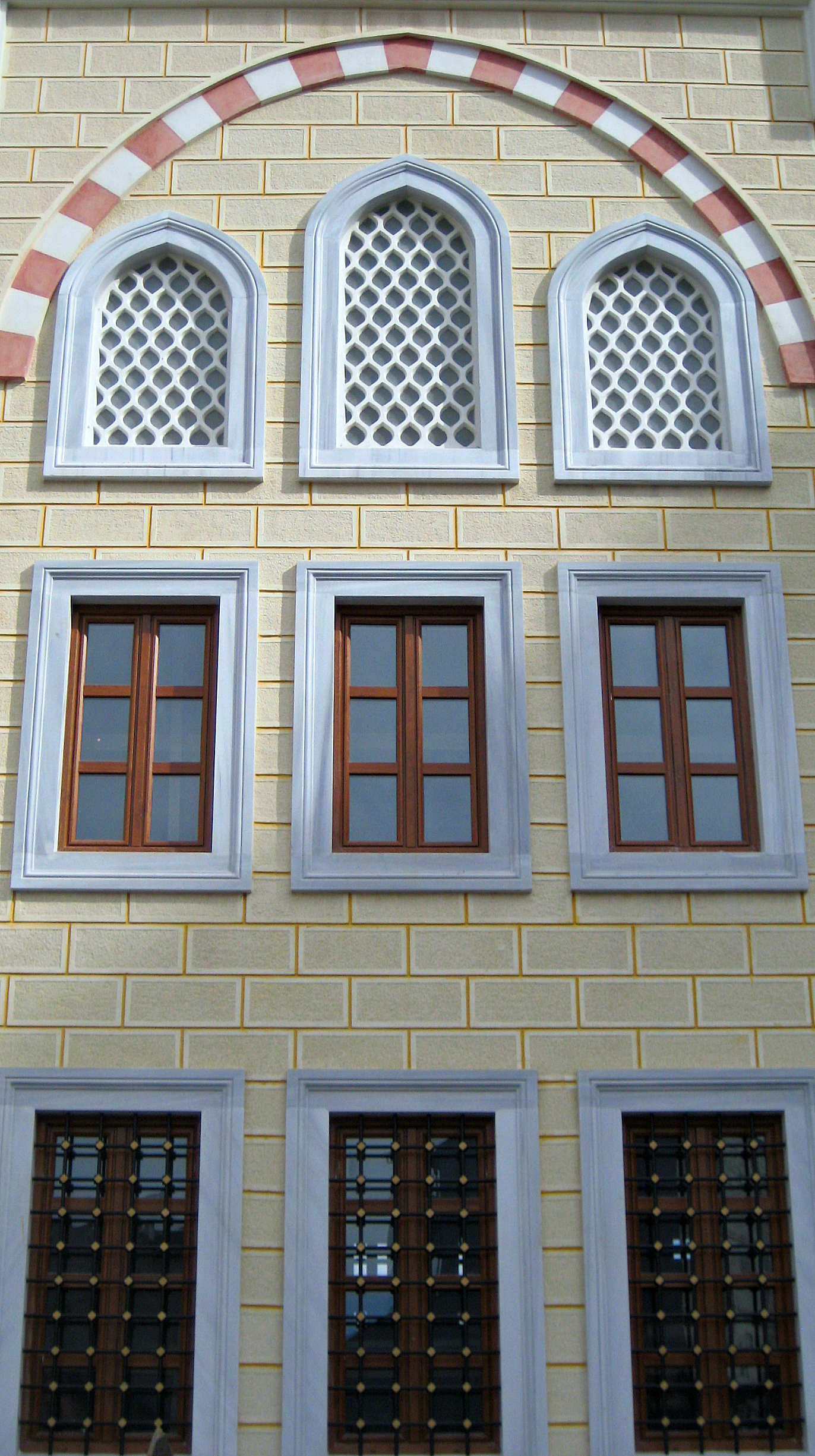
Bajram Pasa Mosque

== See also ==
- Archaeological sites in the District of Mitrovica
