= Xhafer =

Xhafer is an Albanian masculine given name that may refer to

- Xhafer bej Ypi (1880–1940), Albanian politician
- Xhafer Deva (1904–1978), Kosovo Albanian politician
  - Xhafer Deva's house in Kosovo
- Xhafer Sadik (1874–1945), religious leader
- Xhafer Spahiu (1923–1999), Albanian politician
- Xhafer Sylejmani (1879–1953), Albanian physician and politician
- Xhafer Tahiri (born 1983), Kosovo politician
