= Rashan, Kosovo =

Rashan
- Village
- Location in Kosovo
- Coordinates: 42°54′15″N 20°56′32″E
- Location: Kosovo
- District: Mitrovicë
- Municipality: Mitrovicë
- Elevation: 916 m (3,005 ft)

Population (2024)
  - Total: 164
- Time zone: UTC+1 (CET)
  - Summer (DST): UTC+2 (CEST)
- Postal code: 40000
- Area code: +381 28
- Car plates: 02

Rashan (in Albanian) or Rašane (in Serbian) is a village in the municipality of Mitrovica in the District of Mitrovica, Kosovo. According to the 2024 census, it had 164 inhabitants, from whom 164 were Albanian.

== Notable people ==
- Elbasan Rashani, football player

== See also ==
- Rashan Fortress
