= Archaeological sites in the District of Mitrovica =

The strategic position of the region of Mitrovica in the middle of two great rivers Ibar and Sitnica and its mineral wealth in Albanik (Monte Argentarum), made this location populated since the prehistoric period. This region was populated by Illyrians, who were members of the Dardan tribe. The first data for the archaeological sites in the region of Mitrovica, begin with the research of Sir Arthur Evans, who was the first to pinpoint the Roman town of the Municipium Dardanourm. In the archaeological sites of the region of Mitrovica were found traces and objects from different periods such as; Neolithic, Roman, late antiquity and medieval period. Objects and figurines include: fortress vestiges, necropolis, Terpsichore figure, statues, sarcophagus, altar, jewelry, etc.

== Settlements ==
See also: Archaeology of Kosovo

Neolithic Period

- Runik
- Zhitkoc and Karagaç
- Vallaç
- Fafos

Roman Period

- Rashan Fortress
- Municipium Dardanorum
- Pestova

Late Antiquity and Medieval Period

- Stroc Fortress
- Duboc Fortress
- Zveçan Fortress
- Maletaj

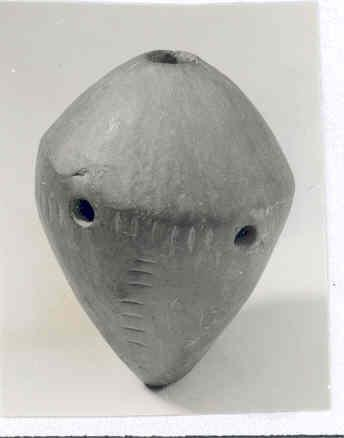
A Neolithic flute-like wind instrument named Runik Ocarina

== Runik ==
Coordinates: 42°47′45″N 20°41′29″E

Runik is a Neolithic archaeological site situated 10 kilometers north-west of the Municipality of Skenderaj, in the Drenica valley. It is typical for the Starcevo Culture, sixth millennium AD, and it is one of the most developed civilizations of this time. The Runik Neolithic site and this area's archaeological findings are considered the most prominent sites discovered in Kosovo. The first archaeological research began in 1966-68 and in 1984, divided into 35 private parcels of the Dardania neighborhood of the Runik village. Fragments of pottery and vast movable material from the Neolithic period were recorded during these researches, evidence Starcevo and Vinca cultures. Advanced research from 2010 included a wider area of this archaeological site, 1000 meters square. This open Neolithic settlement is characterized by huts build by tided wooden beam, without floor levels. The movable archaeological material is dominated by monochrome pottery with red gloss, ceramic pottery painted with geometric and linear motifs, barbotine decorated with impresso technique, anthropomorphic figurines, cult tables, and small altars. From the different dishes discovered in this settlement, the most interesting is a baked clay vase dyed with ocher color, that is decorated in the shape of a spiral with the motive of the palm of the hand painted by dark color. Another interesting artifact discovered in this settlement is a Neolithic flute, which is a unique artifact not only for Kosovo but for the wider region, too. It is a baked clay handcraft creation, it has a height of 8 cm (3 in), with finger holes on the axles and a mouthpiece on the highest ax. It was given the name "Runik ocarina", and it releases sounds and warm vibrations it is the earliest prehistoric musical instrument discovered in Kosovo.

=== Zhitkoc and Karagaç ===
Coordinates: 42.933°N 20.827°E

The archaeological sites of Zhitkoc and Karagaç, are situated in the Municipality of Zveçan. Research in these sites, respectively, Zhitkoc began in 1958, when several test excavations were carried out near the Ibar shore and resulted in discovering remains of a typical Neolithic settlement, of both, Starcevo and Vinca cultures. Researches in the archaeological site of Karagaç were developed during the time frame of 1955 and 1960, the results evidenced a settlement established on the major part consisting of half earth-grounded ellipsoid huts protected with ditches. Inside the dwellings were discovered a considerable amount of Starcevo culture pottery production. Karagaç settlement continued to exist in a later phase, respectively, Vinca culture, whereas;based on the discovered fragments of ceramic and anthropomorphic figurines, and huts that were constructed with intertwined timber beams coated with earth/mud. In this site were discovered also remains and traces of a settlement and cemetery of Bronze and Iron Age, illustrating the life continuation from the prehistoric period.

=== Vallaç ===
Coordinates: 42.949°N 20.834°E

The village of Vallaç is situated north of Zhitkoc-Karagaç, in close vicinity of the Ibar river delta, set on the upraised terrace known as the Vallaç rock, in the Municipality of Zveçan. These archaeological settlements was investigated during 1955 and 1957. Remains of dwellings of this settlement are mainly composed of the huts constructed by timber beams and protected ditches around circular dwellings. The most characteristic objects found in this site belong to the Late Neolithic Vinca Culture and include a considerable amount of the anthropomorphic and zoomorphic figurines, modeled and carefully designed terracotta statues. Below the Neolithic layer of this settlement were discovered some peculiar features such as; fortified traverses that protected the entrance of this settlement, confirming the continuation of this site occupation during the Late Iron Age.

=== Fafos ===
Coordinates: 42.884°N 20.88°E

The archaeological site of Fafos is situated within the industrial quarter of the FAFOS factory (phosphates production), in the suburban area of the Municipality of Mitrovica. The researches in this settlement were developed during the time frame of 1955–1961. The researchers confirmed the presence of two Neolithic settlements (Vinca culture), set apart from one another by approximately 200 meters. In the earlier date settlement or Fafos I, were discovered dwellings of half-buried shelter huts, whereas, in the later date settlement, or Fafos II, were discovered house-huts aligned one aside the other. The unearthed remains of the huts were destroyed in an extensive fire. In both settlements were discovered different objects of everyday use, anthropomorphic figurines, rite vases, terracotta figurines etc. The objects discovered in Fafos I, include a figure of a squatting man, with hands resting on tightly drawn-up knees, a grotesque masked figurine with padded knickers and exposed belly, and altar table in form of an animal-masked woman holding a vessel decorated with meandering bands, and with bull shaped legs. The objects discovered in Fafos II, include a large figure with the upper part wearing a mask and a medallion, a terracotta masked figurine of a nude ithyphallic man in a jumping posture, a terracotta figurine of a bull with human head.

=== Rashan Fortress ===
Coordinates: 42.905°N 20.953°E

Rashan fortress is a late antiquity settlement build by illyrians, respectively dardans in the 4th and 5th centuries AD. It is located in the village of Rashan, approximately 5 kilometers flight distance from the Municipality of Mitrovica. The fortress is built on top of a cliff 80–100 meters from the ground. It has a very favorable position, and together with the Zveçan Fortress they had their role on protecting the mining and mineral wealth of Bajgora Region. It has the shape of the number eight 170–200 meters on the north-south side, and 30–45 meters on the east-west side. The fortress is surrounded by three pairs of walls. The construction of walls is built with well-carved stones, some of the walls have binding material. The walls thickness is approximately 2 meters and the height 2–3 meters. The first pair of walls surrounds the center of the fortress about 300 meters, the second pair of walls surrounds it about 200–250 meters, and the third pair or the inner wall is closer to the center. The Rashan Fortress was protected by four watchtowers, one in the north, two in the west, and another one in the south-east side. The north tower is constructed with stones and binding material. It has the width of 2.50 x 3.80 meters, and the wall thickness of 1.8 meters. From this tower was controlled the road coming from Trepça and the road coming exactly from Rashan north-east of the fortress. In the inner part of the tower, or known as King's Room (Albanian: Dhoma e mbretit) is derived a stair in the form of a guardrail to put things on it. The west side of Rashan Fortress had two watchtowers, and their role was protecting the inner road that led to the inner part of the fortress, by communicating with Cerrnusha and Koder villages located in front of the fortress. The east side watchtower communicated with the Moistir hill while the entire east side starting from the most northern point to the most southern was protected by the nature itself. Another tower of the Rashan Fortress is Donjon, it is located in the center of the castle and it is known as main tower. Based on the toponyms and microponomys around the Rashan village it is stated that this fortress was a branch of Dardan royal dynasty.

=== Municipium Dardanorum ===
Coordinates: 43.317°N 20.483°E

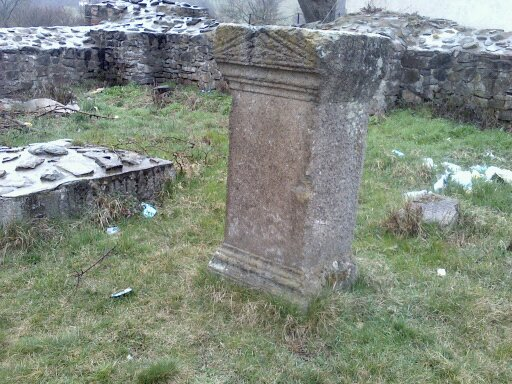
Municipium DD

Municipium Dardanorum or Municipium Dardanicum is an archaeological site situated approximately 27 km (17 mi) in the north of Mitrovica, localized in the village of Soçanica, Municipality of Leposaviç. First researches of this archaeological site began in 1956. The researches were organized by the Museum of Kosovo. After preliminary researches, that were done in 1959 too, began the first diggings in a part of this location. Further researches and diggings continued in the period of 1960–1965. During the researches were included all the parts of the city and two necropolis that were found so far. During 1956 researches, were discovered fragments of the constructive settlement, named "Trojan-grad" or "Anina" that later was verified that actually was part of the forum. Municipium Dardanorum archaeological site stretches approximately 30 hectares, where in the eastern part of this settlement were discovered a forum, horrea, urban basilica, features of the Roman bath, details of auxiliary objects, vessels made of ceramics, and the northern necropolis. The vessels made of ceramics such as plates and pots, have a very rough fracture, with the edges turned sideways. These vessels are decorated with simple waves of lines and fingerprints applied to the cutting bar. The discovered archaeological material and the overall results indicate that, Municipium Dardanorum, primarily existed as a prehistoric settlement, and during the period from the last decades of the 1st century, until the first part of the 4th century AD, continued to develop and become a typical ancient Roman town.

=== Pestova ===
Coordinates: 42.777°N 21.000°E

Pestova village is situated 4 kilometers from the Municipality of Vushtrri. The first archaeological excavations started in 2005, since accidentally were discovered some wall contours during the work in the infrastructure. The archaeological findings resulted on partially unearthing remains of a building, and ruins of a villae rusticae. According to the Roman architecture, villas were complex built structures composed of several accompanied rooms, baths or termae and drinkable water deposits, whereas villas in the towns were known as villae urbana, and villas in the countryside were known as villae rusticae, and to the healthy people they served as places for relaxation. Pestova's villae rusticae most likely belonged to latifondist family, presumably to a very distinguished and rich Furi or Ponti family members from the ancient site of Ulpiana. Parts of villa complex usually are stables for the domestic animals, workshops and storehouses. When analyzing the ancient map Tabvla Imperii Romani, and the site setting of the Pestova villa, it can be argued that most likely, the ancient route that connected Ulpiana with the ancient town of the Municipium DD, passed close or nearby this interesting archaeological site.

=== Stroc Fortress ===
Coordinates: 42.709°N 20.977°E

Stroc village is situated approximately 18 kilometers in the south of the Municipality of Vushtrri. It is known for the existence of a fortress set at the Gradina hill. Based on the construction material and exhibits found here it is a Dardani fortress which was used in continuity since prehistory, Late Antiquity and early medieval period. Based on the terrain configuration and evidenced remains, presumable at this location, in the past, a cult object used to exist and served to the local population. It has a very strategic position, lying on the valley of Sitnica river and Kosovo Valley. The archeological site of Stroc is divided into two parts, Gjytet and Prapshti. Based on the legends Gjyteti was the capital of Artakoll. The Stroc fortress or Gjyteti has two fortified pair of doors. In the top of the fortress are found ruins of a building 25x25 meters, with the walls width of 1,5 meters. Close to this building are some fortified towers. Based on the terrain configuration and evidenced remains, presumable at this location, in the past, a cult object used to exist and served to the local population.

=== Duboc Fortress ===
Coordinates: 42.763°N 20.902°E

Duboc Fortress is situated above the Ceçan, part of the Ciçavica mountain chain, in the village of Duboc, approximately 10–12 km in the south-west of the Municipality of Vushtrri. It is a location of the dardanic cultural group of the 8th and 9th centuries AD Based on the findings of the cultural layers in this location, the discovered archaeological exhibits show about two different civilizations. Civilization A is in the lower layers underneath the civilization B, and the civilization B is in the upper layers. Civilization B or the Duboc Fortress is located in the Mountain of the Town, (alb. "Mali i Gjytetit") from the north-east to the west. The length of the wall of the Duboc fortress is 900 meters, with the width of 2–4 meters, the height it is not known. The town of Duboc had two pairs of doors facing each other. In this fortress were found ceramics with ornaments of the illyrian ethnographic fond, bricks, and marble objects with inscriptions. From the Paleolithic period there were found chisels made of pigs teeth. From the neolithic period were found different types of jewelry: earrings, and coins.

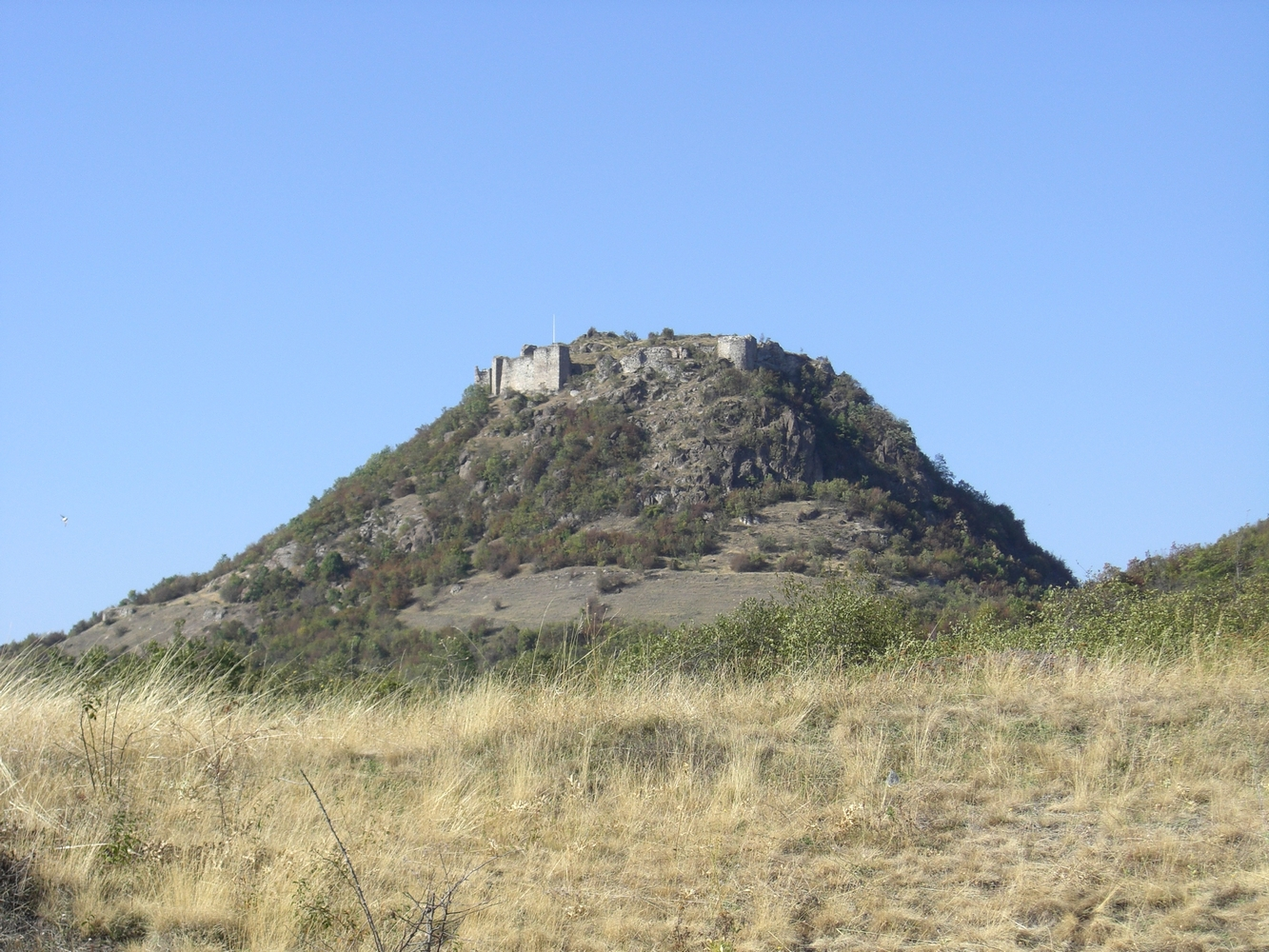
Zvečan Fortress overview

=== Zveçan Fortress ===
Coordinates: 42.904°N 20.847°E

Zvecan fortress is situated approximately 2 kilometers west of the Municipality of Mitrovica. It is located near the Trepça mine, and together with Rashan Fortress they had their role on protecting the mines. First historical written documents about this fortress are by historian Ana Komnena, 1902, and it is classified as a Byzantine castle. Further archaeological researches reflected that Zvecan Fortress it belongs to the Late Antiquity, in respectively 4th century AD. This settlement stands up on a volcanic craggy hill, and it is fortified with stone walls with lime plaster. Inside this archaeological site, respectively fortress are discovered remains of an administration building and a Paleochristian church, but the exact age of these remains it is not defined yet.

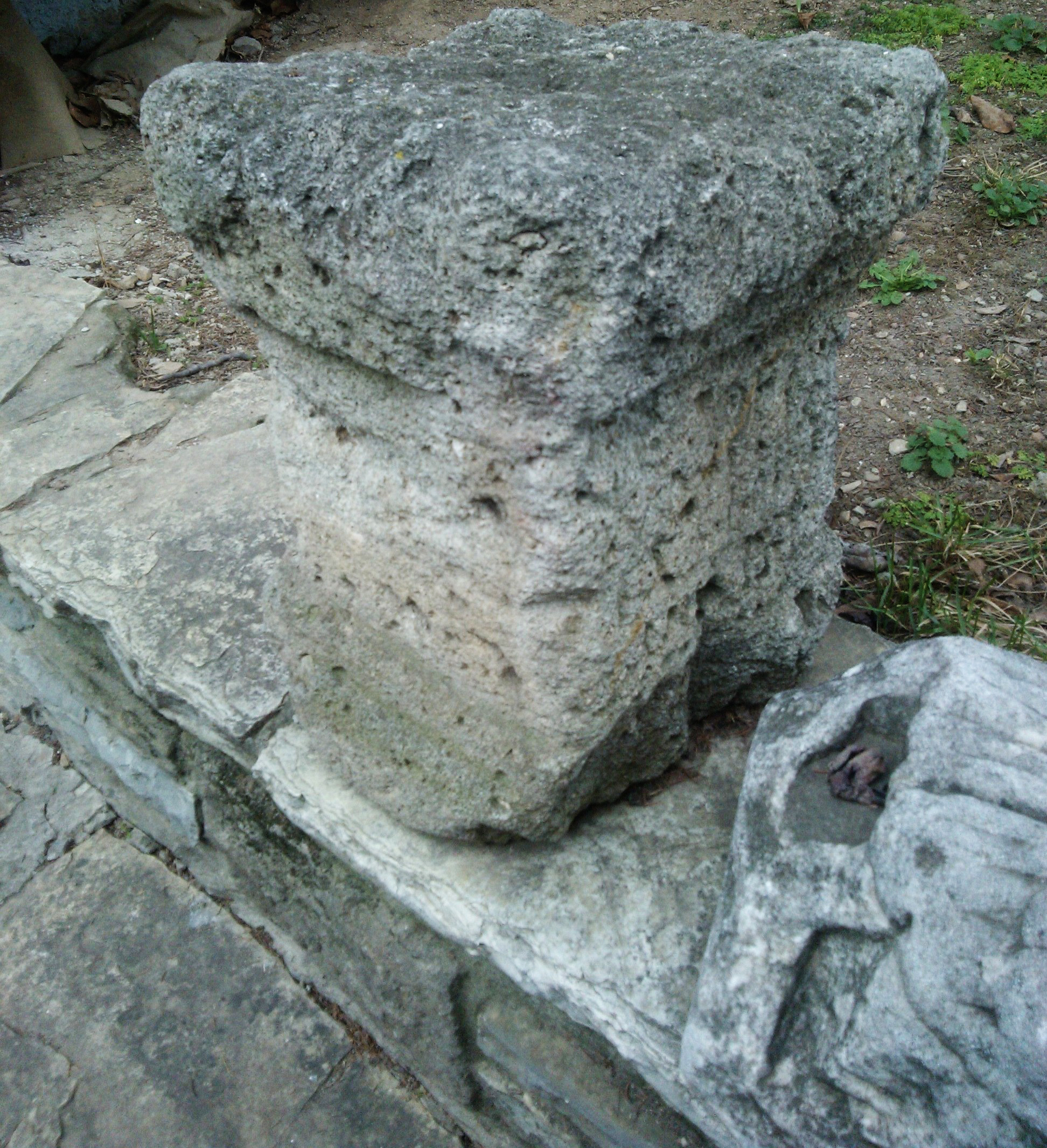
Altar of the Antiquity period, Maletaj, Vushtrri.

=== Maletaj ===
Coordinates: 42.906°N 20.994°E

Maletaj or Gumnishta is situated 18 kilometers in the north-east side of the Municipality of Vushtrri. In this village is found a Dardani location named Katunishte. The substructure of this location is situated in a valley that has the form of the letter T. It has three entrances and it is all enclosed. The main entrance is called "The doors of Katunishta" (Albanian: "Dyert e Katunishtes"). Next to this location is situated "The Hill of Church" where is the groundwork of the church. None of these locations has not been studied yet. In this village was found an altar of the Antiquity period, with inscription that has not been deciphered yet because it is very damaged. Mycrotoponyms in Maletaj: The Crown Mountain, The Goddess Creek, Venc Hill, Creek above Torishta, Fountain of Mata, Fountain of Nika etc.

== See also ==
- Monuments in Mitrovica
