= Koroglu Family House =

Cultural heritage monument of Kosovo

- Shtëpia e Familjes Korogli (Albanian)
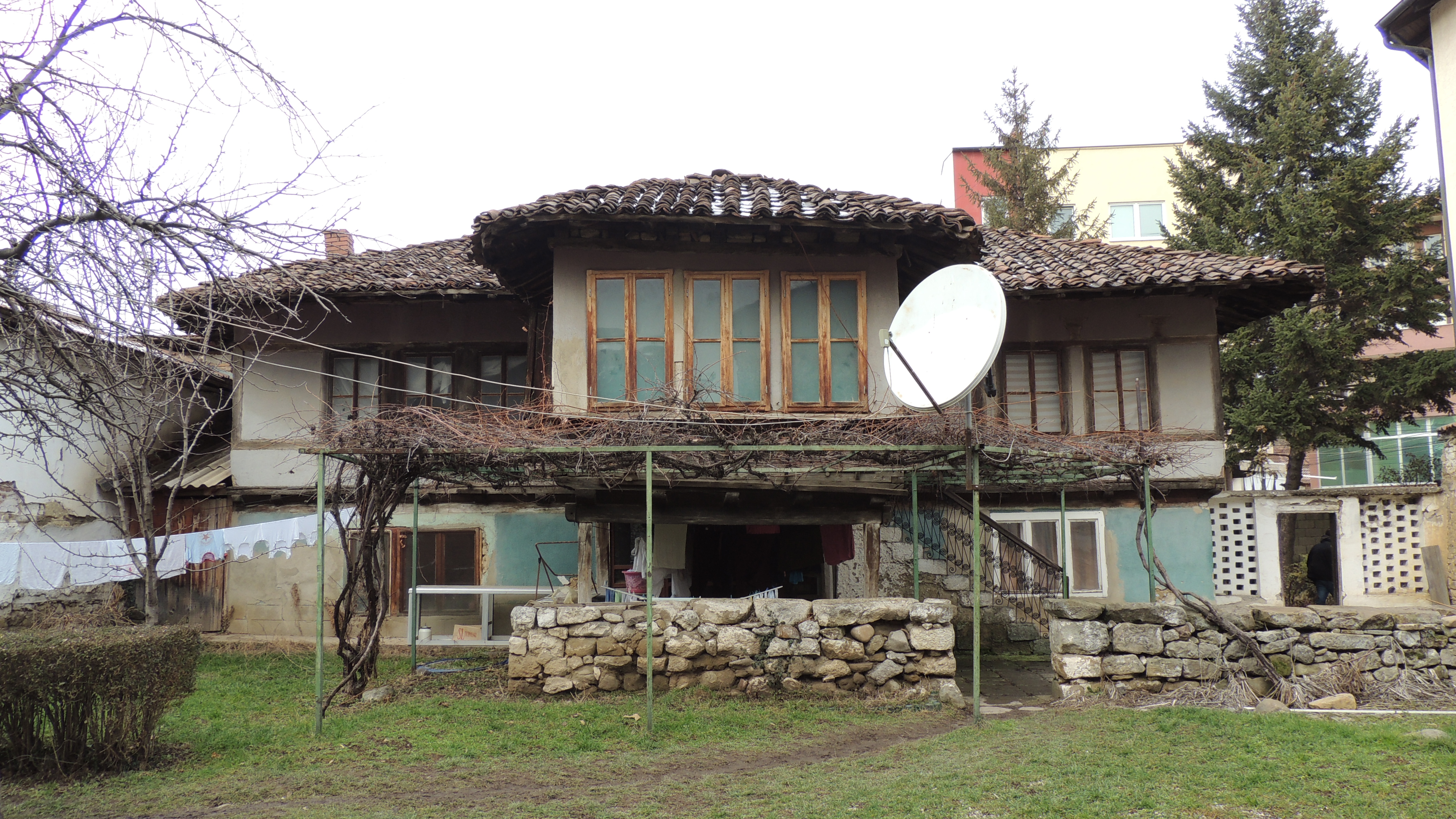
- Location: Mitrovica, Kosovo

History
- Built: 19th century

The Koroglu Family House is a cultural heritage monument in Mitrovica, Kosovo. It was built in the 19th century by the Koroglu (Qorolli) family and is the oldest remaining house in Mitrovica.
