= Xhafer Deva's house =

Building in Mitrovica, Kosovo

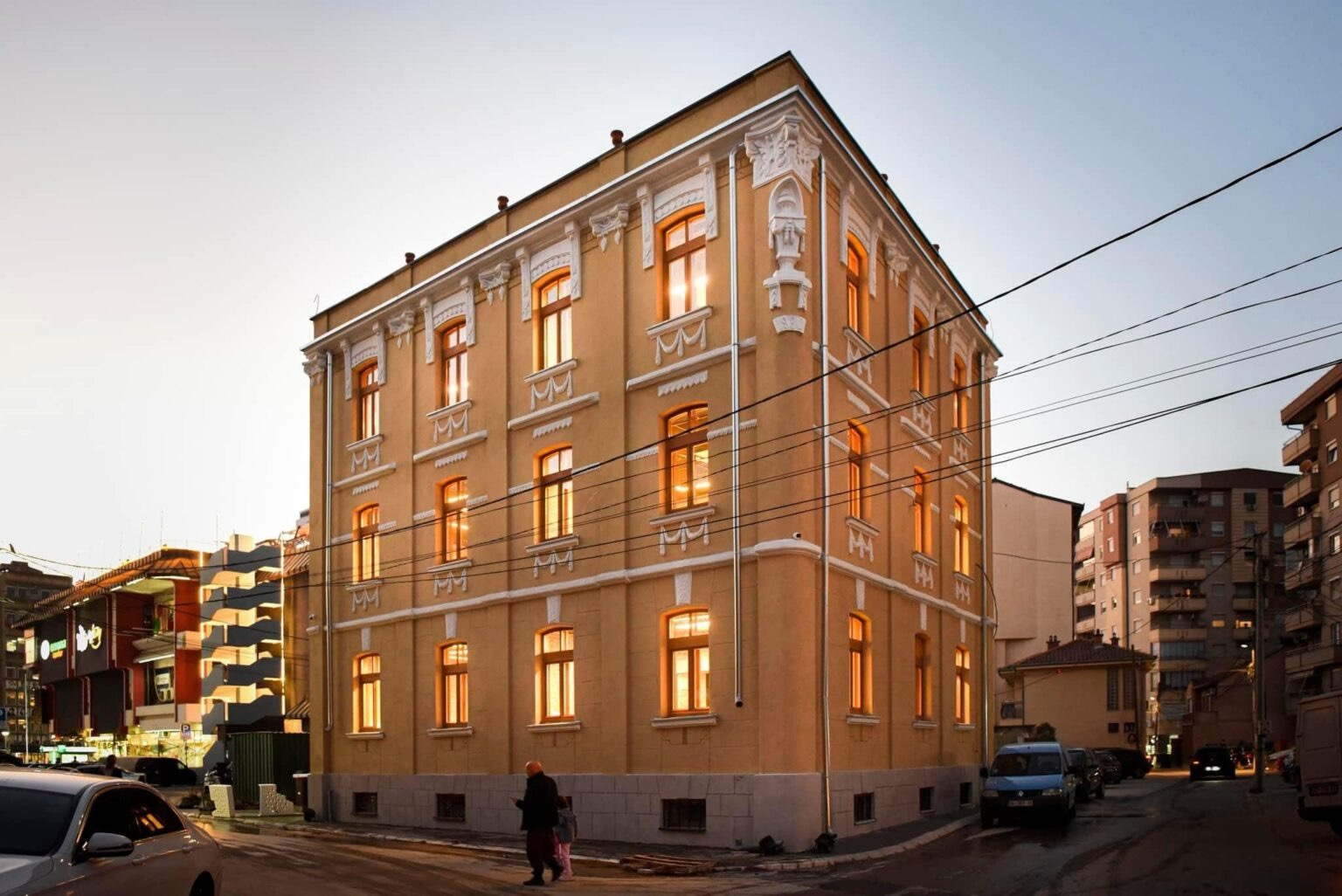
House of Xhafer Deva, 2025

Xhafer Deva's house is a building with great architectural and cultural values which is situated in the city of Mitrovica, Kosovo. It was built in 1930 by Austrian architects and workers. During the Nazi occupation of Albania it was owned by Xhafer Deva, the Albanian Minister of Internal Affairs in 1943 and 1944.

The building has been renovated from 2022 to 2024 by the Kurti government at a cost of over half a million euros, a project that sparked strong public debate both for and against its restoration. In 2021, the EU and the UN initially planned to fund the restoration, but the decision triggered strong criticism from the international community, leading to the funding being halted. Despite the withdrawal of international support, the government decided to proceed with the restoration of Mitrovica’s cultural heritage using its own resources. Since December 2024, the renovation has been completed and the Minister of Culture Hajrulla Çeku has shared photos on Facebook, presenting the project as one of the successes of the Ministry of Culture, Youth and Sport.

== History ==
Even though it has been declared a cultural monument and despite its architectural and historical value, the building was a ruin for decades. It was once the pride of Mitrovica. In 2021, representatives of the cultural heritage center in Mitrovica started planning to restore the building at a cost of about 150,000 euros, after which the cultural heritage center of Mitrovica will be based there, some rooms will turn to a museum for Xhafer Deva and his family, and the municipality will have rooms to host international guests.

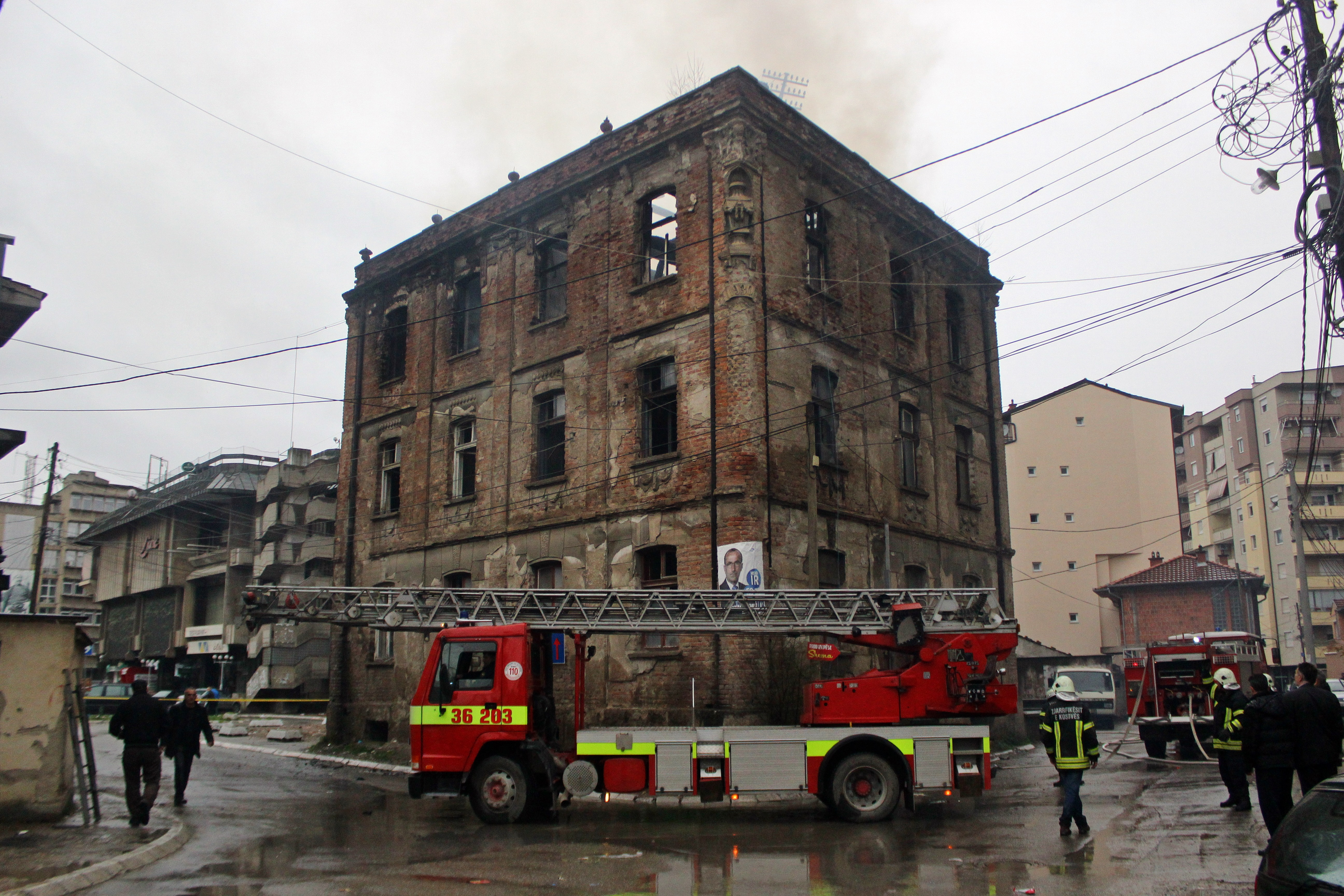
The building after a fire

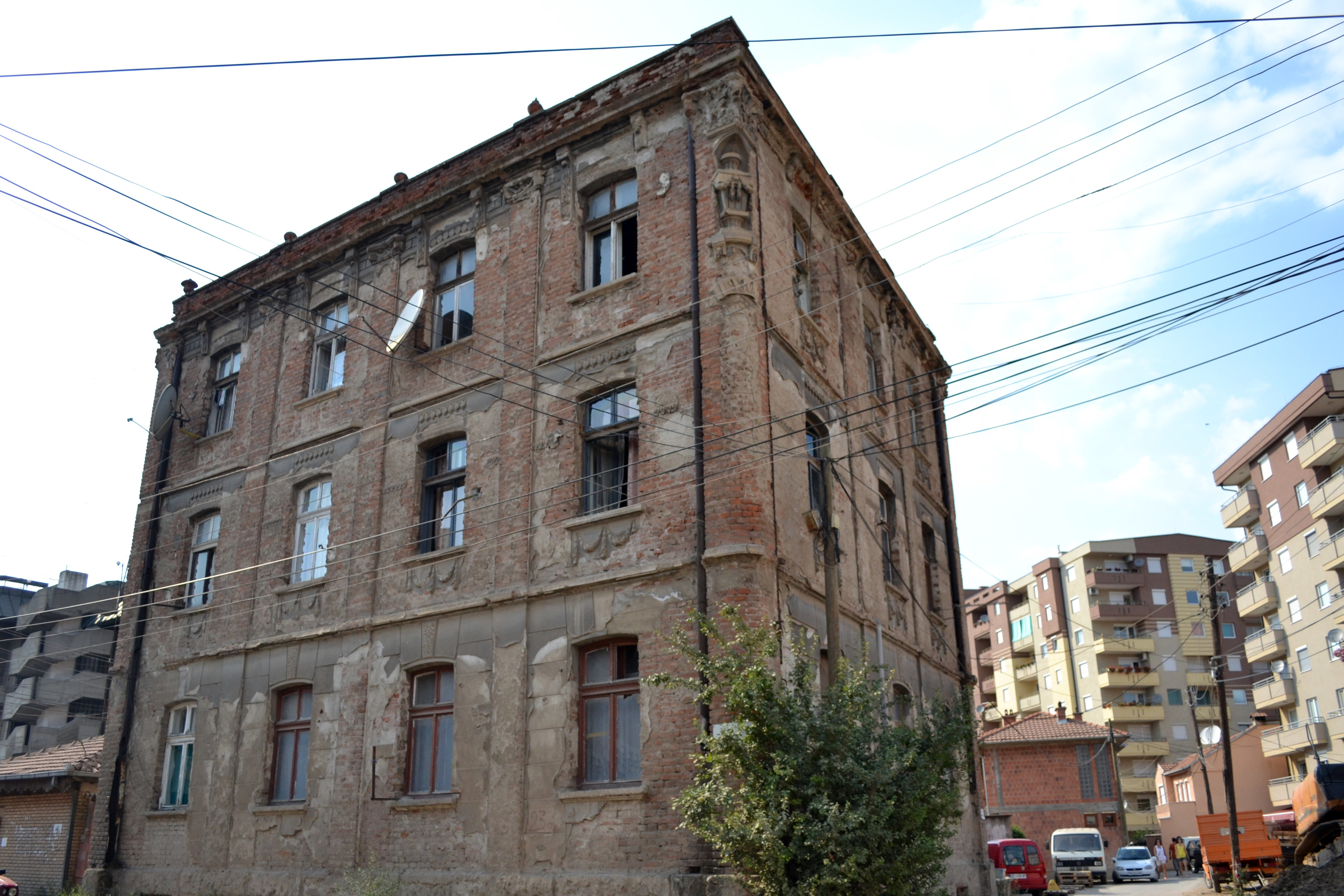
Xhafer Deva´s house before the renovation

The German ambassador to Pristina, Joern Rohde, was one of the first to deliver his criticism of an attempt by the UNDP in Kosovo and European Union Office in Pristina to renovate the property. “Very concerned about restoration plans for Xhafer Deva’s house, a known Nazi collaborator and protagonist of infamous SS Skanderbeg Division,” Rohde wrote on Twitter.

During the war poor, displaced families lived there at risk to their lives and where other people threw their garbage.

== See also ==
- Monuments in Mitrovica
- Xhafer Deva
