= Monument to the Serbian and Albanian Partisans =

- Споменик рударима јунацима из НОБ
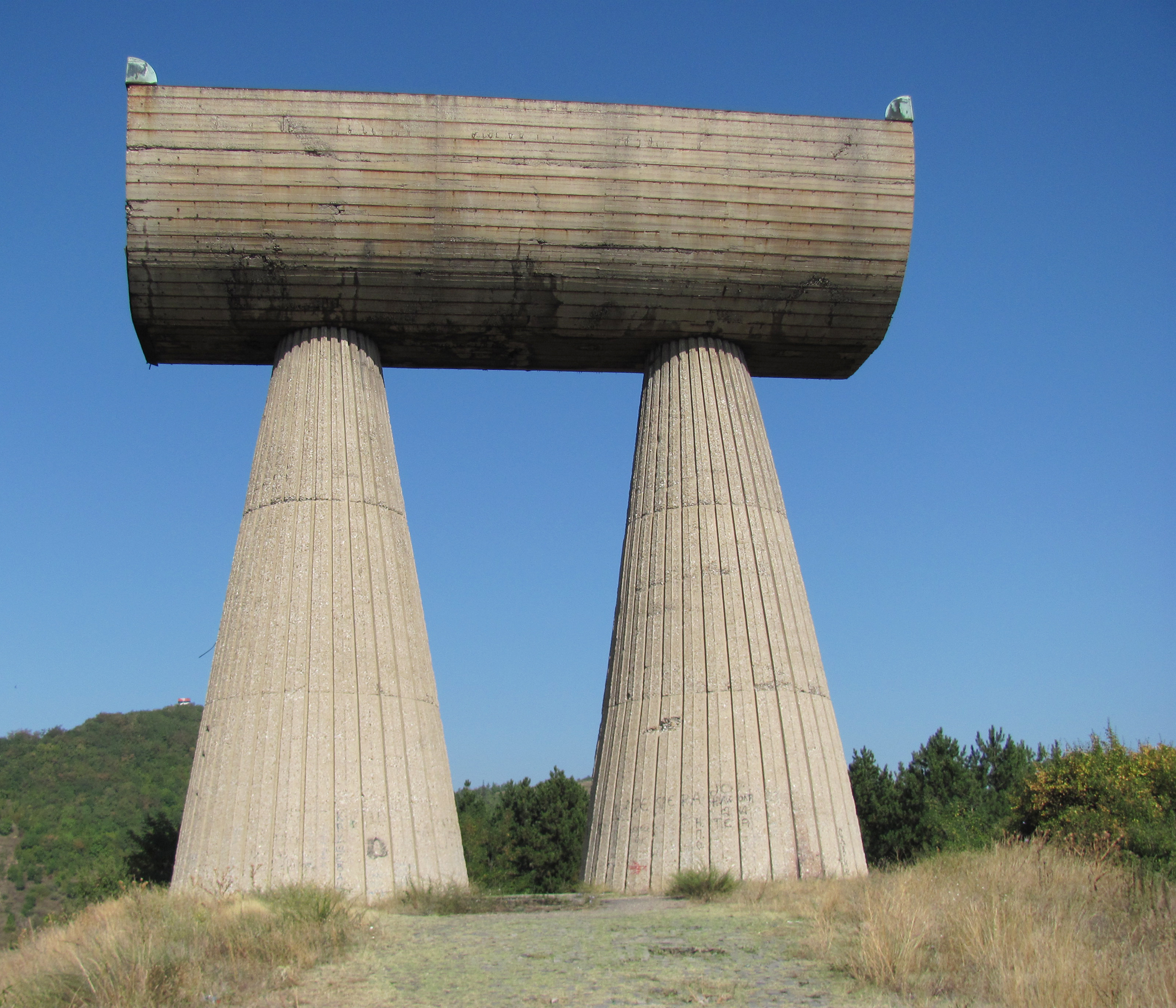
- Monument to the Albanian and Serbian Partisans
- Interactive map of Monument to the Serbian and Albanian Partisans
- Location: near Mitrovica, Kosovo
- Coordinates: 42.8957830°N 20.8602094°E
- Designer: Bogdan Bogdanovich
- Opening date: 1973
- Dedicated to: Albanian and Serbian partisans from the Republic of Kosovo who died in World War II in Yugoslavia

The Monument to the Serbian and Albanian Partisans (also known as the Monument to the Partisans and Miners and the Monument to the Heroes of the National Liberation War) honors the Albanian and Serbian partisans from the Republic of Kosovo who died in World War II in Yugoslavia from 1941–1945. Erected in 1973, the monument is on a promontory named Miner’s Hill, located above Mitrovica, Kosovo. Its creator was architect Bogdan Bogdanović.

== History ==
The idea of building the monument was put forward in 1959 on the day of the 20th anniversary of the Trepch miners' strike. The monument preserves the memory of local partisan fighters of Serbian and Albanian nationalities who formed a partisan mountain company, which fought against the occupying Axis forces, and local collaborators.

== Architecture ==
The 19-meter-high monument resembles a trilithon consisting of three elements: two conical columns and a grooved structure. The sides of the gutter were originally coated with copper, with small decorative elements at each of the four corners. The columns are said to represent the two peoples of Kosovo through their unity during the anti-fascist struggle. Another definition states that the monument is similar to vans carrying ore from a mine to a metallurgical plant.

A large number of bronze plaques are installed at the base of the monument, as well as two symbolic cenotaphs: one in front and one behind the monument. The cenotaph in front of the monument consists of four white tombstones with the names of the killed Albanian and Serbian partisans. The inscriptions are written in Albanian, Serbian, and Latin. The back cenotaph is the same, only nothing is written on it.

The lower part of the columns is covered with graffiti, and most of the copper plates on the sides of the gutters fell off over time due to lack of maintenance and weather conditions.
