= Dejzi =

Kosovo Albanian fashion designer

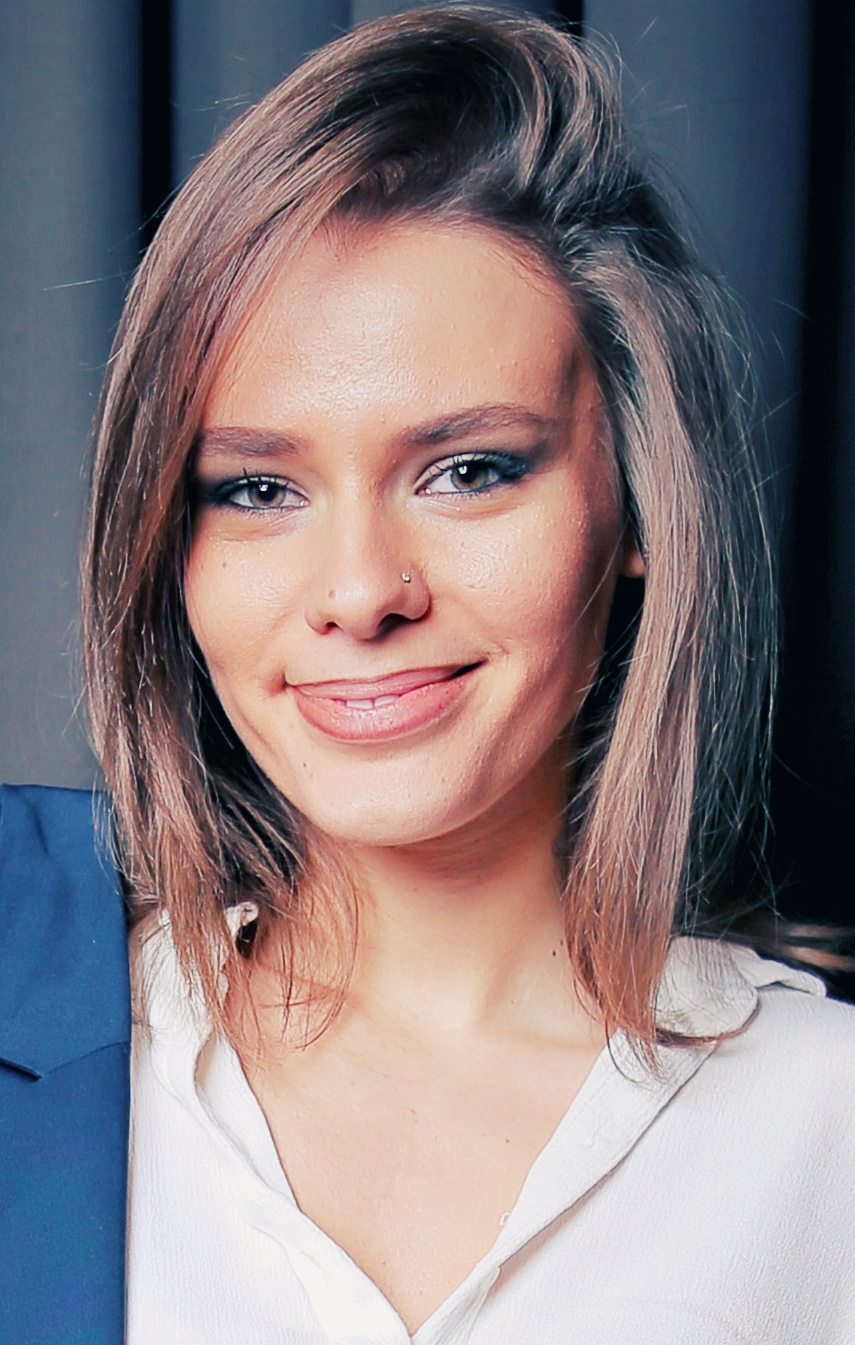
- Dejzi, 2017
- Born: Diellza Krasniqi; 10 September 1993 (age 32); Mitrovica, FR Yugoslavia (now Kosovo)
- Occupation: Fashion designer
- Years active: 2010s–present

Diellza Krasniqi (born 10 September 1993), better known by her artistic name Dejzi, is a fashion designer from Kosovo.

== Early life ==
Diellza Krasniqi was born in Mitrovica, Kosovo. On her teenage years she started developing her passion for sewing and fashion while being influenced by her mother who was a dressmaker at the time. Diellza presented her collection ‘Galaxy’ in Harbin Fashion Week in January 2018. Diellza has worked with international celebrities, such as Nour Al Ghandour, Katja Glieson, Gizele Oliveira, Narin Ammara, and Tayna

== Collections ==
Diellza has presented her work throughout the years through her various collections, such as:

- Pralla, March 2016
- Delphinium, November 2017
- Galaxy, January 2018
- Gradient, May 2018
- By The Way, November 2018
- Éternité, December 2018
- Bloom, April 2019
- Énorme, October 2019.
