= Mitrovica railway station =

Railway station in Kosovo

Mitrovica
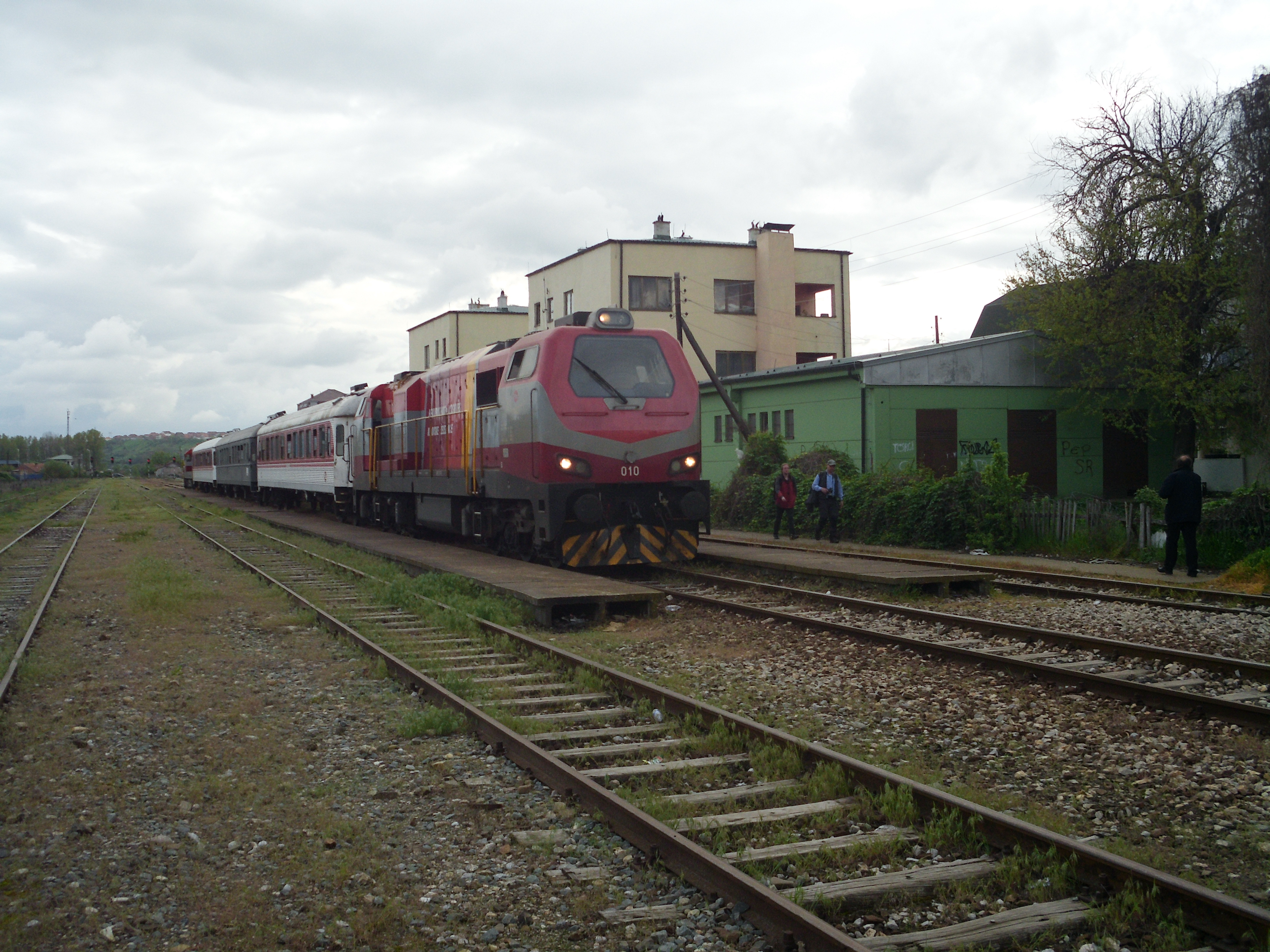
- The station in 2014

General information
- Location: Bislim Bajgora; Mitrovica; Kosovo
- Coordinates: 42.8930°N 20.8748°E
- Platforms: 2
- Tracks: 2

History
- Opened: 1874
Location

Mitrovica railway station (Albanian: Stacioni i trenit në Mitrovicë) is the central railway station in the city of Mitrovica. The station will be rehabilitated.

== History ==
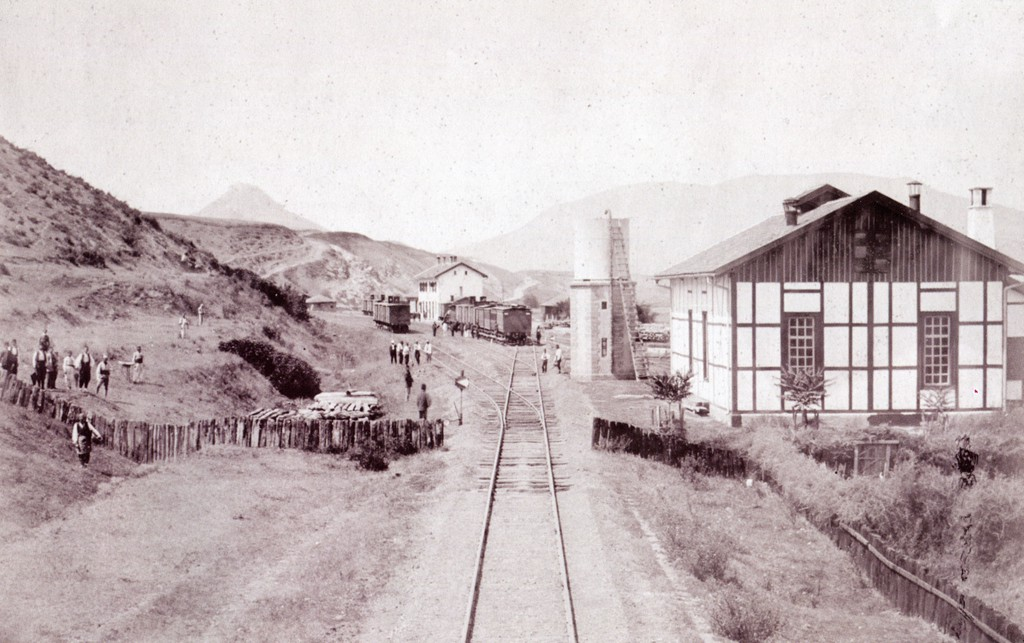
The station in 1894

It was completed in 1874 being one of the oldest railway stations in the region and linked Mitrovica to Skopje and to the port of Thessaloniki. Another line later linked the town to Belgrade and Western Europe.
