= St. Peter's Basilica Church, Stari Trg =

Ruins of a Roman Catholic church near Mitrovica, Kosovo

St. Peter's Basilica Church
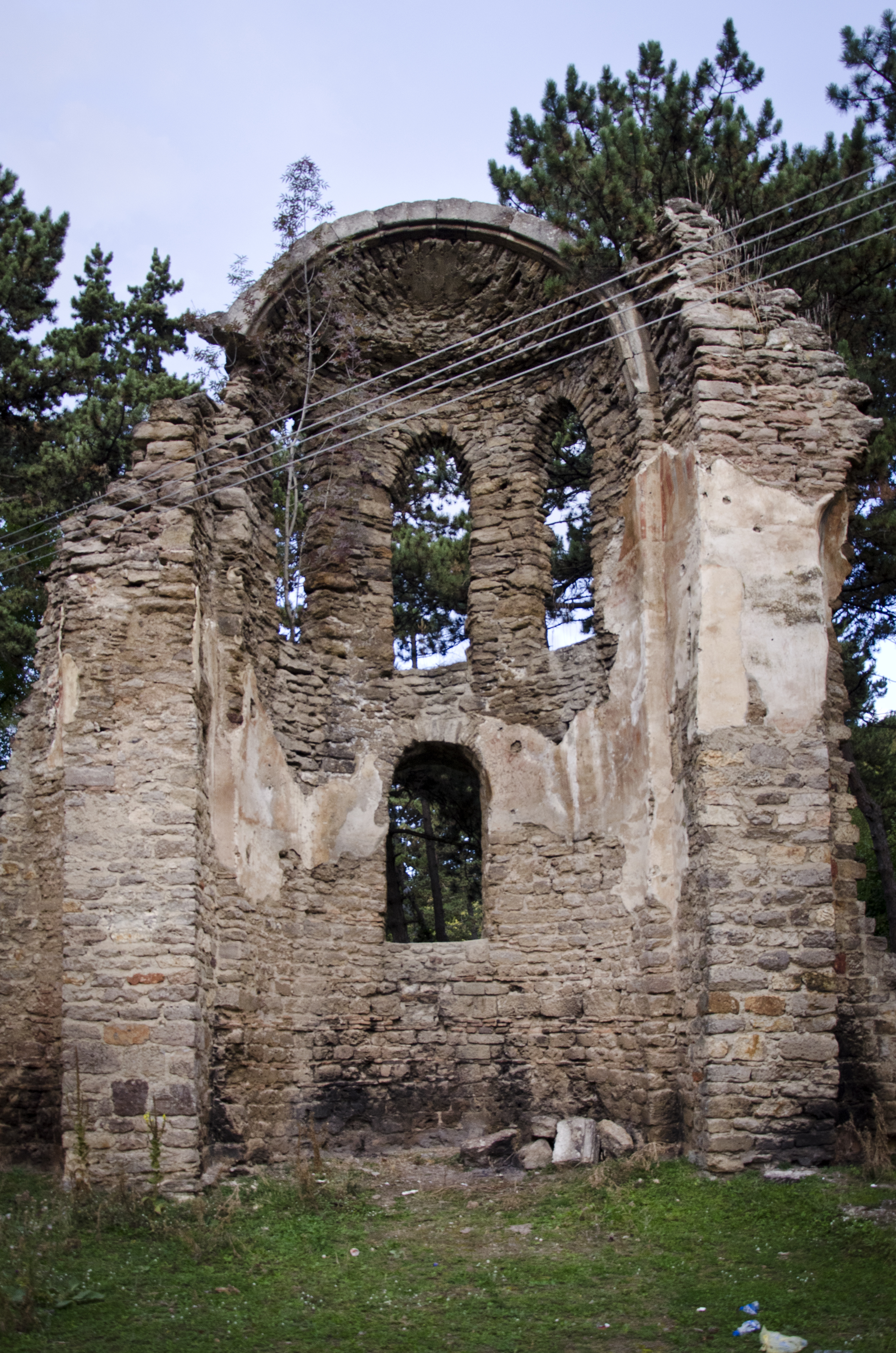
- Ruins of the church's eastern wall

Religion
- Affiliation: Roman Catholic Church
- Diocese: Mitrovica District
- Status: ruin

Location
- Location: Stari Trg, Mitrovica, Kosovo
- Interactive map of St. Peter's Basilica Church

Architecture
- Type: Gothic architecture
- Completed: 1303
- Materials: Stone
- Cultural Heritage under Permanent Protection
- Official name: Gërmadhat e Kishës "Latine / Katolike, Sakse", "Shën Pjetër"
- Type: Archaeological Heritage: Reserves
- Reference no.: 6

St. Peter's Church (Albanian: Kisha e Shën Pjetrit), known as the Latin Church (Serbian Cyrillic: Латинска црква) or the Saxon Church (Сашка црква), is an old Roman Catholic church built in the 13th century, near Mitrovica in Kosovo. It was a Protected Monument of Culture of the Republic of Serbia from 1958, and is protected as a Cultural Heritage by the Republic of Kosovo.

The church was built by Saxon miners and Catholic merchants from the maritime cities during the medieval Kingdom of Serbia. Intended to serve the Catholic community needs, it was firstly mentioned in 1303, in conjunction with the town of Trepça. In the 21st century the church is almost entirely in ruins and only the old part of the perimeter walls remains. The only wall standing is the main part of eastern wall, with three apses. The building is of the basilica type, while the shape and construction of the walls is indicative of Byzantine influence.

== See also ==
- Monuments in Mitrovica
- Stari Trg mine

== Sources ==
- SANU. "Латинска или Сашка црква". Споменици културе у Србији. 164.
- Ministry of Culture of Kosovo, Ruševine Latinsko Katoličke crkve, saksa Sveti Petar (Mitrovica), Ministry of Culture of Kosovo
