= North American Private University =

Private University in Tunisia

Coordinates: 34°50′29.8″N 10°45′20.6″E

- Other name: Université nord-américaine privée
- Motto: Learners today...Leaders tomorrow
- Type: Private university
- Established: 2012
- Founder: Dr Chafik Abid
- Accreditation: ASIIN, Eur-ACE, ISO
- Dean: Dr Chafik Abid
- Director: Louis Boisgibault
- Location: Sfax, Tunisia
- Campus: Sfax North, Sfax South
- Language: French, English
- Website: www.nau.tn

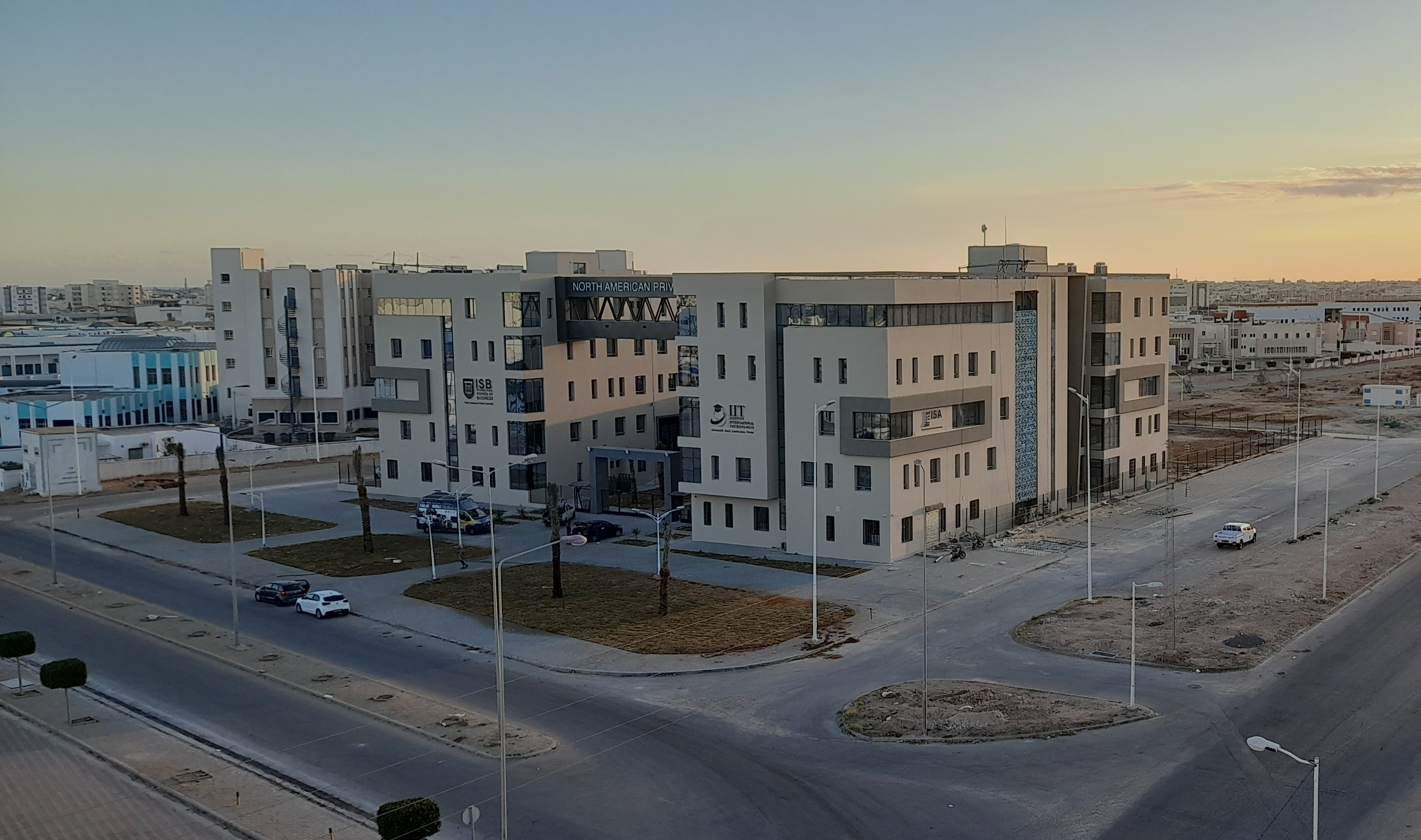

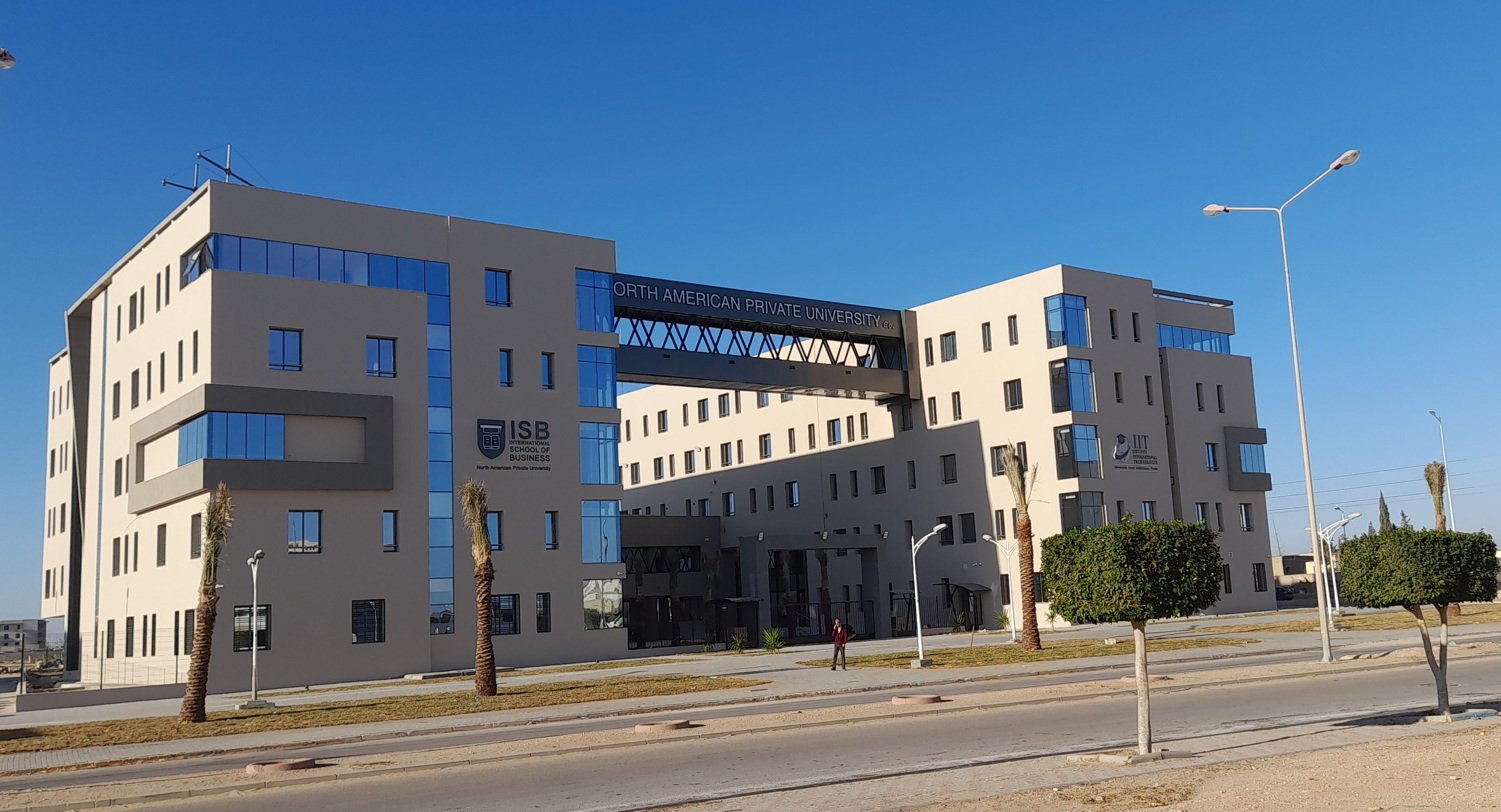

North American Private University (French: Université nord-américaine privée) is a private university with an engineering school (International Institute of Technology – IIT), an architecture school (International School of Architecture, a department of IIT) and a business school (International School of Business), and is based in Sfax, Tunisia. It is accredited by the Ministry of Higher Education and Scientific Research and by the Accreditation Agency for Degree Programs in Engineering, Computer Science, the Natural Sciences and Mathematics (ASIIN). The university has 2 campuses: Sfax North and Sfax South.

== History ==
North American Private University was co-founded in 2012 by Dr Chafik Abid. a Tunisia born academic who obtained a PhD from Laval University in Quebec and then the Canadian citizenship. The aim of the university is to train future engineers, architects, and managers in Tunisia by providing them with solid national and international educational frameworks, as well as a diversity of academic backgrounds that combine theory and practice. The University is led by its co-founder, Dr Chafik Abid, who has recruited additional faculty and administrative staff over the years. The university has signed partnerships with many international universities and companies to enable students to pursue studies and experiences abroad. With over 1200 students in 2022, the university has built a new campus in the technopole of Sfax North in one year, and held a ceremony to celebrate its completion in January 2023. It welcomes an increasing number of international students, especially from West and Central Africa.

== Diplomas ==
North American Private University offers several undergraduate and graduate courses in engineering, architecture and business administration.

→ International Institute of Technology (IIT):

- Preparatory cycle for engineering studies.
- Undergraduate tracks leading to License in Computer engineering and in Industrial engineering.
- Graduate tracks leading to the National Diploma of Engineer in Computer engineering, Industrial engineering, Civil engineering, Mechanical engineering, Process engineering

→ International School of Architecture (ISA), a department of IIT:

- Undergraduate and graduate courses leading to the National Diploma of Architecture.

→ International School of Business (ISB):

- Undergraduate programs in Business Administration (License Nationale de Gestion, License of Business Administration).
- Graduate programs in Business Administration, including a 2-year MBA 100% in English and Specialized Master Programs in different fields such as in Digital Marketing, Financial Engineering and Accounting.

North American Private University is well ranked among its peers.

== Faculty & research ==
North American Private University has a faculty of more than 30 permanent professors, most of them holding a PhD from a Tunisian or an international university. Among the permanent professors:

- Dr Chafik Abid.
- Louis Boisgibault

International Institute of Technology (IIT) has won two Erasmus+ research projects:

→ ENHANCE targets constructive objectives which are crucial for the development and the modernization of both Tunisian and Moroccan industry.

→ INTESA aims to provide a complete definition and evaluation of good greenhouse production practices used in Mediterranean climatic zones.
