= Fafos =

Archaeological site in Kosovo

- Cultures: Vinča culture
- Location: Mitrovica, Kosovo

History
- Built: Neolithic period

Site notes
- Excavation dates: From 1955 to 1961

Fafos is a Neolithic archaeological site in Mitrovica, Kosovo.

== Location ==
The archaeological site of Fafos is situated in the suburban area of Mitrovica, set within the industrial quarter of a phosphates production factory.

== Overview ==
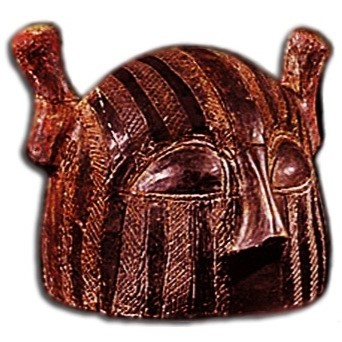
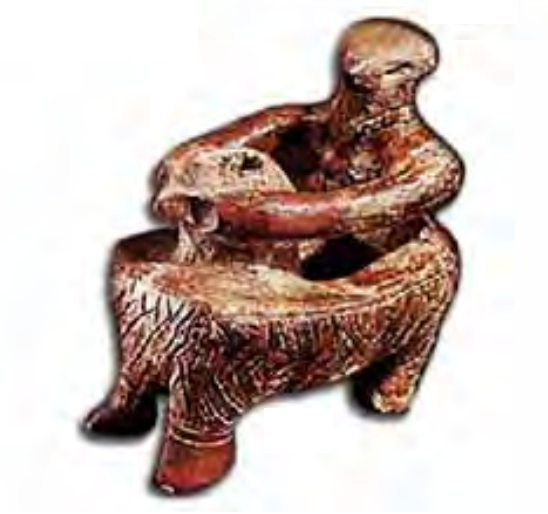
The prosopomorphic lid (left) and the centaur figurine (right) found in the Fafos archeological site

The site was explored between 1955 and 1961, covering an area of approximately 1,200 square meters. The excavations confirmed the existence of two distinct Neolithic settlements (Vinča culture), separated by around 200 meters. The earlier settlement (Fafos I) featured semi-subterranean shelter huts, while the later settlement (Fafos II) had house-huts arranged side by side. Archaeological research revealed that most of the huts were destroyed in a large fire. Artifacts found in both settlements include everyday objects, cult items, ritual vases, and anthropomorphic figurines.

== See also ==
- Archaeological sites in the District of Mitrovica
- Neolithic sites in Kosovo
- Archaeology of Kosovo
