= Louis Boisgibault =

Ministerial advisor,academic director, professor and author

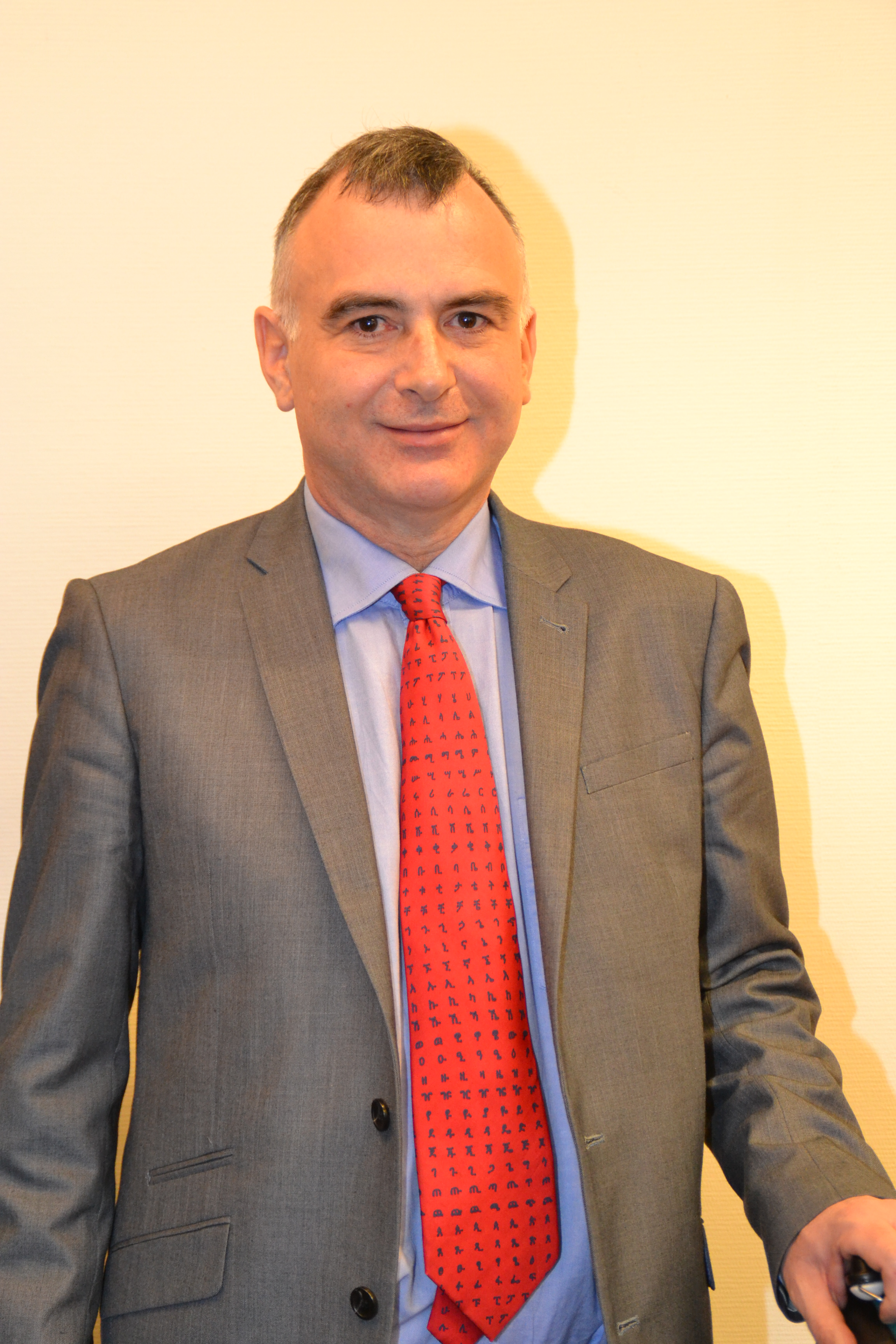
- Born: 30 June 1962; Neuilly-sur-Seine, France
- Occupations: Geoeconomist, ministerial advisor, academic director, professor, author

Academic background
- Education: Sorbonne Université, HEC Paris, Wharton School, Université Paris-Dauphine

Academic work
- Institutions: Paris, Sfax, Mitrovica
- Main interests: Renewable energy, climate, corporate governance
- Notable works: "Energy Transition in Metropolises, Rural Areas and Deserts".

Louis Boisgibault is a French geoeconomist, ministerial advisor, academic director, researcher and author known for his work on energy transition in the EMEA Region. He currently serves as an expert advisor to the Minister of Economy of the Republic of Kosovo and as professor elected to the Steering Council of the public International Business College - Mitrovica in Kosovo.

== Early life and education ==
Boisgibault was born in Neuilly-sur-Seine. He completed his schooling at Lycée Saint-Louis-de-Gonzague in Paris. He graduated in 1984 with a master's degree in economics and management from Université Paris-Dauphine. He received an MBA from HEC Paris in 1990 with an exchange program at the Wharton School. In September 2016, he defended successfully a PhD thesis at Sorbonne Université in geography.

== Early career ==
After eight years at BNP-Paribas in Paris and Amsterdam, Boisgibault worked for Electricité de France and Engie Group in Paris and London, as executive director and Board member for energy projects. In 2006, he co-founded and led VALMERE, a consulting firm specialized in energy transition, which was later dissolved during the Covid crisis in 2021.

== Academic career ==
Boisgibault started lecturing at the Master Energy Finance Carbon program at Paris-Dauphine University in 2007. He published his first book on solar energy, L'énergie solaire après Fukushima, in 2011. In 2013, he enrolled at Sorbonne University, graduating with a PhD in 2016 after defending a thesis on territory and energy transition. He has authored 18 academic papers, including the co-authored book Energy Transition in Metropolises, Rural Areas and Deserts, published by ISTE-Wiley and held part-time roles as a Senior Lecturer and contractual professor, notably at HEC Paris.

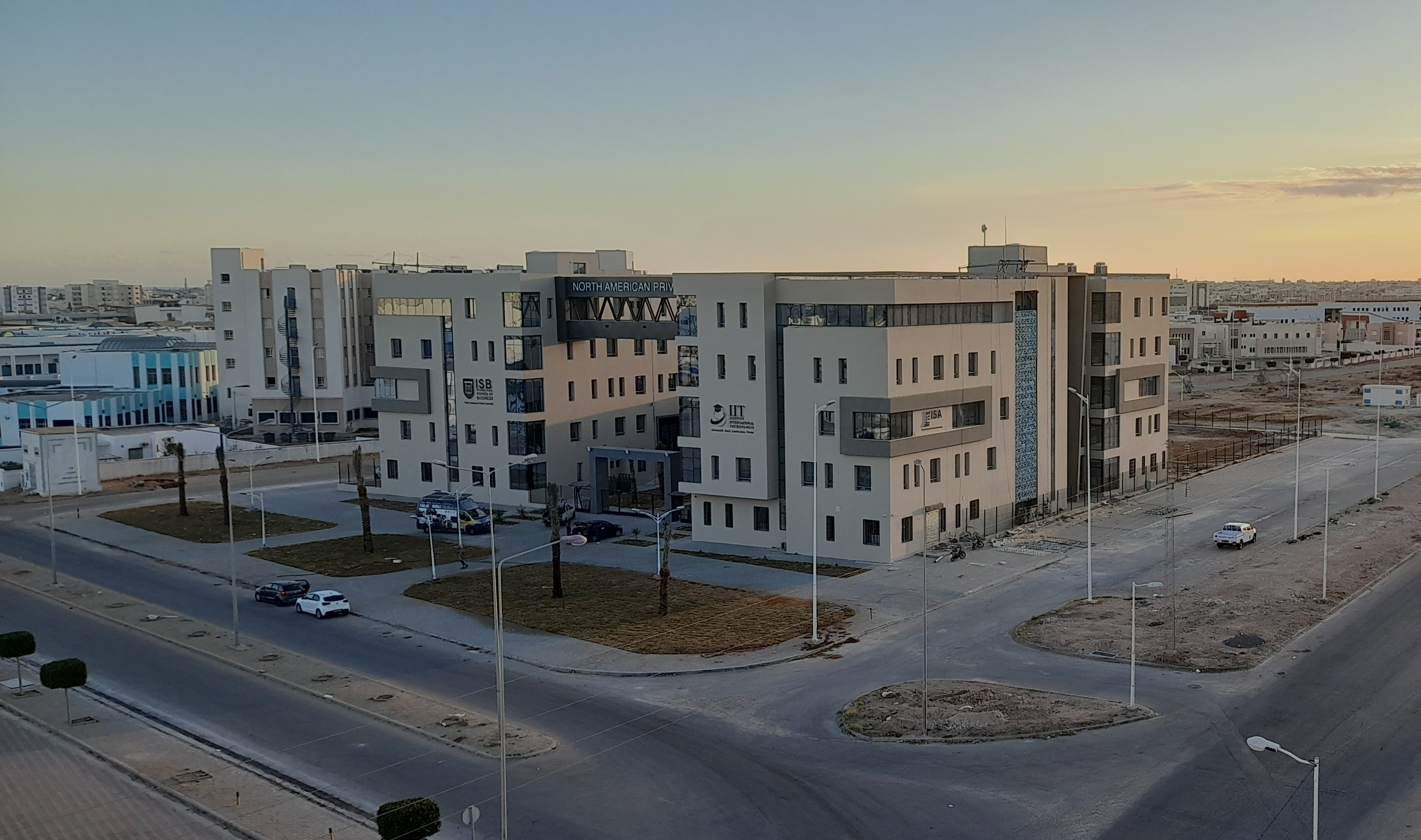

In March 2022, Boisgibault was appointed as Director of Development and Cooperations and full-time faculty member at North American Private University in Sfax, Tunisia and took part in the opening of the new campus.

In september 2023, he was interviewed live on BFM TV regarding the geopolitical implications of irregular migration from Sfax to Lampedusa. and moved to Kosovo in 2024.

== Roles in Kosovo ==
In August 2024, he joined Expertise France to be deployed as Expert & Technical Advisor to the Minister of Economy of the Republic of Kosovo, Artane Rizvanolli, in the Minister's cabinet in Pristina, to advise on energy transition.

In November 2024, he was elected by the Academic Council as international Professor to the Steering Council of the International Business College - Mitrovica (IBC-M) for 5 years (2024 - 2029), in Northern Kosovo, in addition to his diplomatic role in Minister's Cabinet.

On April 7, 2025, Boisgibault was auditioned by 4 parliamentarians of the French National Assembly's Foreign Affairs Committee for the Information Report 1889 for a possible peace agreement between Kosovo and Serbia.

== Publications ==
=== Books and book chapters ===
- Energy Transition in Metropolises, Rural Areas and Deserts. With Fahad Al Kabbani and foreword by Jean Girardon. Wiley, 246 pages, 2020, Energy series, 9781786304995.
- Transition énergétique dans les métropoles, la ruralité et le désert. Avec Dr Fahad Al Kabbani et préface de Prof. Dr. Jean Girardon. ISTE editions, 236 pages, 2019, collection énergie, 9781784056025.
- L'énergie solaire après Fukushima, la nouvelle. With foreword by Prof. Dr. Patrice Geoffron. Medicilline, 154 pages, 2011, Clés de l'énergie, 9782915220377.
- Energies. Géographie des mers et des océans, Sous la direction de Prof. Dr. Raymond Woessner. Atlande, 2014, 9782350302751.
- Carbon Constraint in the Mediterranean: Differentiated Impacts and Policies for Carbon Reduction in the Euro-Mediterranean Region, Report IPEMED, with Morgan Mozas, 54 pages, September 2012
- Etre executive director à Londres. Avec HEC Alumni. Témoignage dans le livre collectif : 100+ témoignages sur la gouvernance d'entreprise. Plus de 100 diplômés HEC de tous horizons partagent leur expérience des conseils d'administration., Les Ozalids d'Humensis, 2020, 978-2380210101.

=== Conference papers ===
- Changement climatique en Afrique subsaharienne, de la vulnérabilité à l'adaptation. Avec Prof. Dr. Pauline Dibi-Anoh. Douzièmes Journées Géographiques de Côte d'Ivoire (JGCI - 2020), Association des géographes de Côte d'Ivoire (AGCI), Feb 2020, Grand-Bassam, Côte d'Ivoire.
- Les énergies renouvelables, l’expérience du Pays de Fayence. Fête de la Science, Ministère de l’Enseignement supérieur, de la Recherche et de l’Innovation, Oct 2018, Saint-Raphaël, France.
- How could the EU benefit from the COP 21 agreement?. Avec Prof. Dr. Catalin N. Lungu. International conference on energy performance of buildings, Faculty for building services engineering (FII - UTCB), Jun 2016, Bucarest, Romania. pp. 3.
- Vision prospective de la transition énergétique dans les territoires. Réussir la transition énergétique, quelles dynamiques de changement., UFR Géographie et aménagement Lille, Jan 2015, UFR Géographie et aménagement Lille, France. pp. 610.
- COP21 objectives: towards a joint energy transition in the Mediterranean ?. COP21, IPEMED, Nov 2015, Le Bourget, France.
- Au-delà des discours et des intentions, comment dynamiser le cadre réglementaire et institutionnel pour développer les énergies renouvelables dans l’UEMOA ? : Le Maroc peut-il servir d’exemple à l’UEMOA pour la bonne territorialisation de l’énergie solaire ?. Africa Power Forum 2014, I Conferences, Jun 2014, Dakar, Sénégal.
- La croissance verte, quels défis pour les pays de l'UEMOA ?. Forum du quarantenaire, BOAD, Nov 2013, Lomé, Togo. p9.
- Poster, Industrialisation of village in Southern France by solar energy: How energy transition can dynamize a territory?. Annual Research Conference - 2014 (ARC'14), Nov 2014, Doha, United Arab Emirates. Qatar Foundation, Energy & Environment (EEPP0277), pp.Ref. 10.5339/qfarc.2014, 2014, Proceedings volume 1.
