= Mitrovica, Kosovo =

City and municipality in Kosovo

Mitrovica: Mitrovica or Mitrovicë (Albanian) Mitrovica or Митровица (Serbian)
- City and municipality
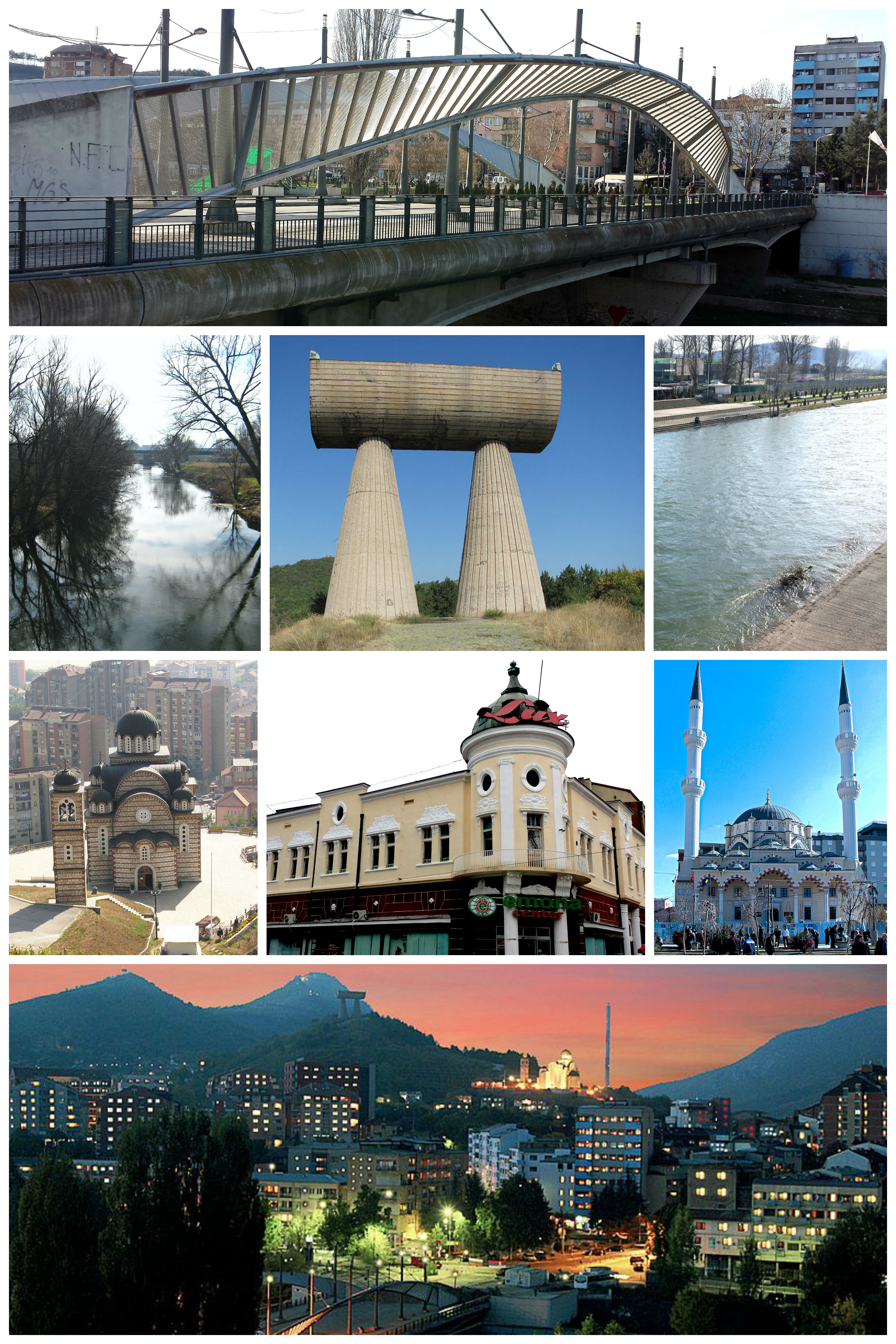
- Ibar Bridge, Sitnica River, Miners Monument, Ibar River, St. Dimitri Orthodox Church, Former Jadran Hotel, Sand's Mosque, Mitrovica at night panoramic view.

- Emblem
- Interactive map of Mitrovica
- Location within Kosovo
- Coordinates: 42°53′N 20°52′E
- Country: Kosovo

Government
  - Mayor: Faton Peci (LVV/Guxo)

Area
  - Municipality: 331 km^{2} (128 sq mi)
  - Urban: 54.983 km^{2} (21.229 sq mi)
  - Rank: 17th in Kosovo
- Elevation: 500 m (1,600 ft)

Population (2024)
  - Municipality: 72,662
  - Density: 220/km^{2} (569/sq mi)
- Demonym(s): Albanian: Mitrovicas (m), Mitrovicase (f); Gheg dialect: Mitrovicali (m); Mitrovicalike (f)
- Time zone: UTC+1 (CET)
  - Summer (DST): UTC+2 (CEST)
- Postal code: 40000
- Area code: +383 28
- Vehicle registration: 02
- Website: Official site

Mitrovica (Note: Albanian indefinite form: Mitrovicë; Serbian Cyrillic: Митровица) or Kosovska Mitrovica, (Note: Serbian Cyrillic: Косовска Митровица; Albanian: Mitrovica e Kosovës) also referred to as South Mitrovica (Note: Albanian: Mitrovicë Jugore, definite form: Mitrovica e Jugut; Serbian: Јужна Митровица / Južna Mitrovica) or South Kosovska Mitrovica, (Note: Serbian: Јужна Косовска Митровица / Južna Kosovska Mitrovica) is a city in northern Kosovo and administrative center of the district of Mitrovica. In 2013, the city was split into two municipalities, South Mitrovica and North Mitrovica. Settled 10 km (6.2 mi) from Ujmani/Gazivoda Lake, on the confluence of the rivers Ibër, Sitnica, Lushta, and Trepça, the city is surrounded by the mountains of Kopaonik, Rogozna, Mokna, and Čičavica. According to the 2024 census, the municipality had 72,662 inhabitants of which 64,742 reside in southern Mitrovica and 7,920 in northern Mitrovica.

The history of Mitrovica is rooted in antiquity, with evidence of early settlements of Neolithic and Roman-era artifacts discovered in the region. During the Middle Ages, the area played an important role in the Byzantine and Serbian Empires, while the modern city was founded during the rule of the Ottoman Empire. Its strategic location along trade routes made it an important center for commerce and cultural exchange during this time. These influences have contributed to the diverse heritage and cultural mosaic of Mitrovica, which continues to be a notable aspect of the city's identity.

In the modern era, Mitrovica's history has been marked by various events, including the industrial development of Trepça Mines, a major mining and metallurgy complex, during the Yugoslav period; the Kosovo War and the ethnic divisions that emerged in its aftermath in 1999. In 2013, following the North Kosovo crisis, the city was divided by the Ibar River into two separate municipalities, South Mitrovica with an ethnic Albanian majority and North Mitrovica with an ethnic Serb majority.

Following the Kosovo War in 1999 and the city's ethnic division, Mitrovica suffered economic collapse, turning from the economic center of Kosovo before 1999 to the poorest region in Kosovo after. According to the Kosovo Statistics Agency, of all urban municipalities in Kosovo, Mitrovica has the highest unemployment rate and the highest number of dependents from state transfers.

Mitrovica is also an important university center with the University of Mitrovica "Isa Boletini" in the south, and University of Pristina who operate in Serbian system in the north and several private universities.

== Etymology ==
The name of Mitrovica derives from the name Demetrius. It was most probably named after the 8th century Byzantine church St. Demetrius which was built near Zvečan Fortress, just above the modern Mitrovica, in honor of Saint Demetrius of Thessaloniki.

The earliest evidence of the name of this city dates back to 1430 when it was mentioned in a Roman document as 'Dimitrovica.' In the Republic of Ragusa, in the documents 'Lamenta de foris' from 1446, the city was referred to as De Dimitruic. Throughout the late Middle Ages and Ottoman era, various travelers documented the name of the city. The German traveler Arnold von Harff mentioned Mitrovica in 1499 as Mitrix, while Benedikt Kuripečič, in 1530, referred to the city as Bazar Mitrovica. In 1660, the Ottoman explorer Evliya Çelebi mentioned the city with the name Mitrovica for the first time. From 1878 to 1890, the city was known as Mitrovica of Bazar, most probably due to the fact that it was under the Sanjak of Novi Pazar (Jenipazar)".

After President Tito's death in 1980, each of the constituent parts of Yugoslavia had to have one place named with the word "Tito" (or "Tito's") included, the city was then known as Titova Mitrovica (Титова Митровица) in Serbian or Mitrovica e Titos in Albanian, until 1991.

The official name of the city in the Republic of Kosovo is Mitrovicë or Mitrovica (in Albanian) and Mitrovica (in Serbian), reflecting its bilingual character and regional context. In Serbian context, the name is Kosovska Mitrovica (Serbian Cyrillic: Косовска Митровица) is used to distinguish it from Sremska Mitrovica, a city in Vojvodina, Serbia. In Turkish, the city is called Mitroviça.

Since the split of the Municipality of Mitrovica into two municipalities in 2013, with the creation of Serb-majority municipality in the northern side, the official names of the municipalities have changed. The original Municipality of Mitrovica is now officially known as South Mitrovica (Albanian: Mitrovica e Jugut; Serbian: Јужна Митровица, romanized: Južna Mitrovica) while the newly formed municipality is North Mitrovica (Albanian: Mitrovica e Veriut; Serbian: Ceвepнa Митровица, romanized: Severna Mitrovica).

== History ==
=== Prehistory & Antiquity ===
There is archaeological evidence that proves the region of Mitrovica has been inhabited since the Neolithic era. The oldest settlements discovered in the area are the archeological sites of Zhitkoc, Karagaç and Vallaç, near Zvecan (around 5 km (3.1 mi) north of Mitrovica) and archaeological site of Fafos which is situated in the suburban area of Mitrovica.

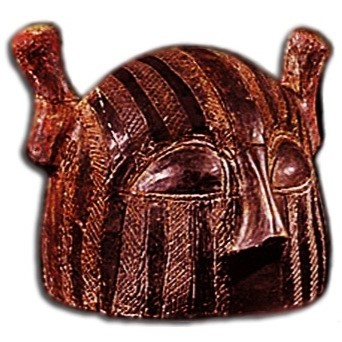
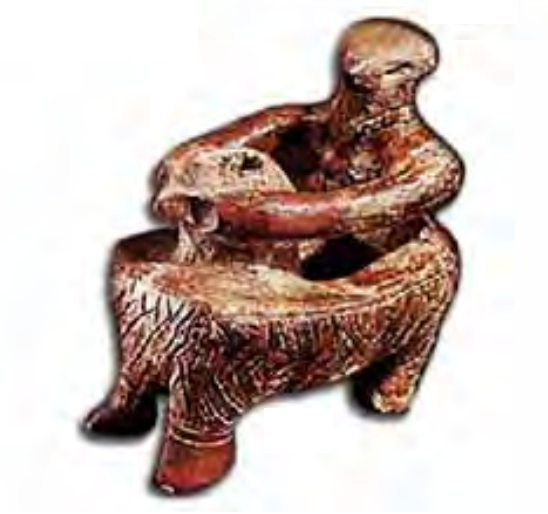
The prosopomorphic lid (left) and the centaur figurine (right) found in the Fafos archeological site

The archaeological site of Fafos is located in the suburban area of Mitrovica, within the industrial zone adjacent to the a phosphates production factory. This site underwent excavation between 1955 and 1961, covering a total area of approximately 1,200 square meters. The findings confirmed the presence of two separate Neolithic settlements associated with the Vinča culture, situated about 200 meters apart from each other. The earlier settlement, referred to as Fafos I, consisted of characteristic semi-subterranean huts used for shelter. In contrast, the later settlement, known as Fafos II, featured house-huts arranged in a row. Notably, archaeological research indicated that a significant portion of the huts in both settlements had been destroyed by an extensive fire. Artifacts discovered in these settlements included various everyday objects such as cult items, ritual vases, and anthropomorphic figurines.

The Neolithic site of Zhitkoc, situated approximately 3 km (1.9 mi) north of Zveçan, is positioned on a plateau near the Zhitkoc train station. In 1958, a series of preliminary excavations were conducted near the banks of the Ibar River, revealing the remains of a typical Neolithic settlement that belonged to both the earlier Starčevo culture and the later Vinča culture.

The adjacent archaeological site of Karagaç is found on a lower terrace along the riverbank and was investigated between 1955 and 1960. The archaeological findings indicated occupation during the middle Neolithic period. The settlement mainly consisted of semi-subterranean, elliptical huts, protected by ditches. Inside these dwellings, a significant amount of pottery associated with the Starcevo culture was uncovered. Furthermore, the settlement persisted into a later phase, with huts constructed from interwoven timber beams coated with earth/mud. Evidence from ceramic fragments and anthropomorphic figurines suggests that this settlement was also inhabited during the earlier stage of the Late Neolithic, specifically the Vinca culture. In addition to Neolithic artifacts, traces of a settlement and cemetery from the Bronze and Iron Ages were discovered in the same area, underscoring the continuity of human habitation from prehistoric times.

=== Middle Ages ===
While there is limited historical evidence regarding the early Middle Ages when the region was under Byzantine rule, the period between the 9th and 15th centuries witnessed a series of significant events that made the area a focal point for conflicts involving the Byzantine Empire, the Medieval Kingdom of Serbia, the Bulgarian Empire and Ottoman Empire, being ruled by each of them in different periods.

During this time, the fortified settlement of Zvečan emerged as a key location, playing a pivotal role in the expansion and development of the Kingdom of Serbia under Nemanjić rule. Its strategic position made it a center of power in the region.

Simultaneously, the settlement of Trepca began to evolve into a thriving mining town. The development of mining activities and trade significantly contributed to the region's significance and economic growth.

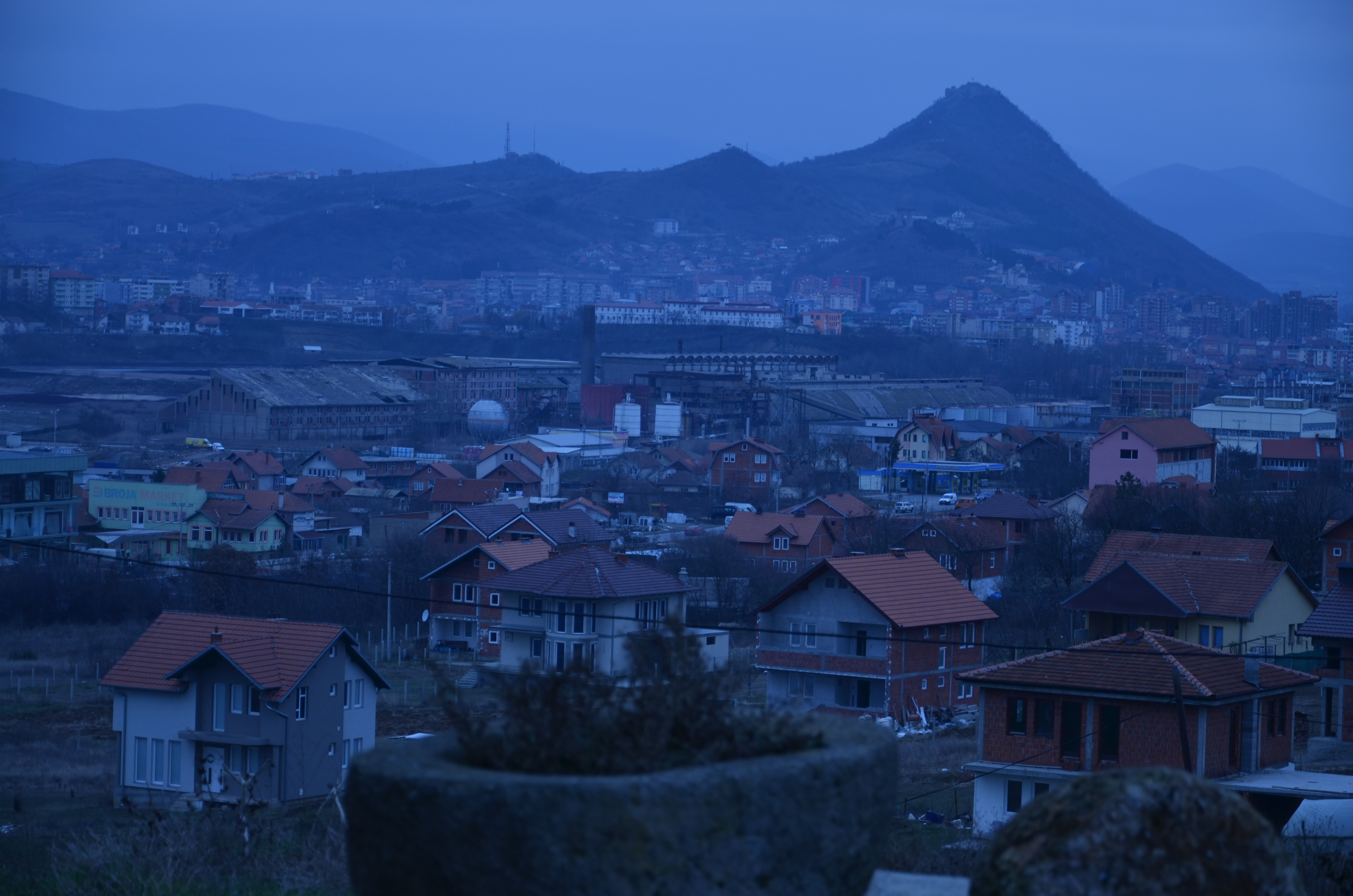
The Zvecan Fortress overlooking the modern Mitrovica from the top of the extinct volcano vent

Notable structures were constructed during this era, including the Banjska Monastery, Sokolica Monastery, and the Saxon St. Peter's Basilica Church, Stari Trg. The Saxon Church in Stan Terg, built by Saxons, underlines the importance of the mining industry during this period in the region.

With the Ottoman occupation in 1389, after the Battle of Kosovo, the fortified town of Zvecan turned into an active military site well into the 18th century, after which it was abandoned. During this time the population settled along the valley of Ibar and Sitnica, founding this way the modern settlement of Mitrovica. Mitrovica probably got the name after the 8th century Byzantine church St. Demetrius which was built near Zvečan Fortress, just above the modern Mitrovica, in honor of Saint Demetrius of Thessaloniki.

Several Roman and Ragusian documents mention the city respectively as Dimitrovica in 1430 and 'De Dimitruic' 1446, while the German traveler Arnold von Harff mentioned the city in 1499 as 'Mitrix.

=== Ottoman Empire ===
Several neighborhoods in the area of Trepča according to the Ottoman defter of the 16th century were Islamised and the other neighborhoods contained people with a mixture of Christian, Albanian and Slavic names. According to Selami Pulaha, the Ottoman defters of 1591 indicate that the area of Trepča in the 16th century had a significant Albanian population, with some Albanian names being combined with other Christian or Slavic names.

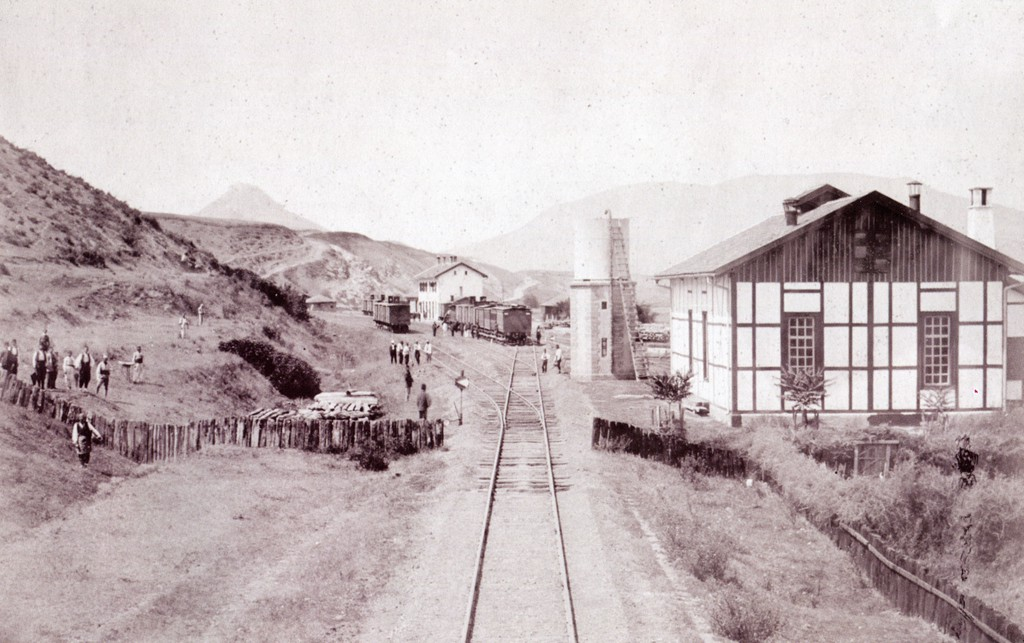
Mitrovica train station in the late 19th century Ottoman Empire

Under Ottoman rule Mitrovica was a small city typical to the region. Rapid development came in the 19th century after lead ore was discovered and mined in the region, providing what has historically been one of Kosovo's largest industries.

It became an industrial town, formerly the economic centre of Kosovo because of the nearby Trepça Mines. It grew in size as a centre of trade and industry with the completion of the railway line to Skopje in 1873–1878, which linked Mitrovica to the port of Thessaloniki. Another line later linked the town to Belgrade and Western Europe.

By 1890, Mitrovica had a population of 7,000 and it had a strategic importance. For this reason, Russian Empire and Austria-Hungary opened consulates in the town.

=== World War II ===
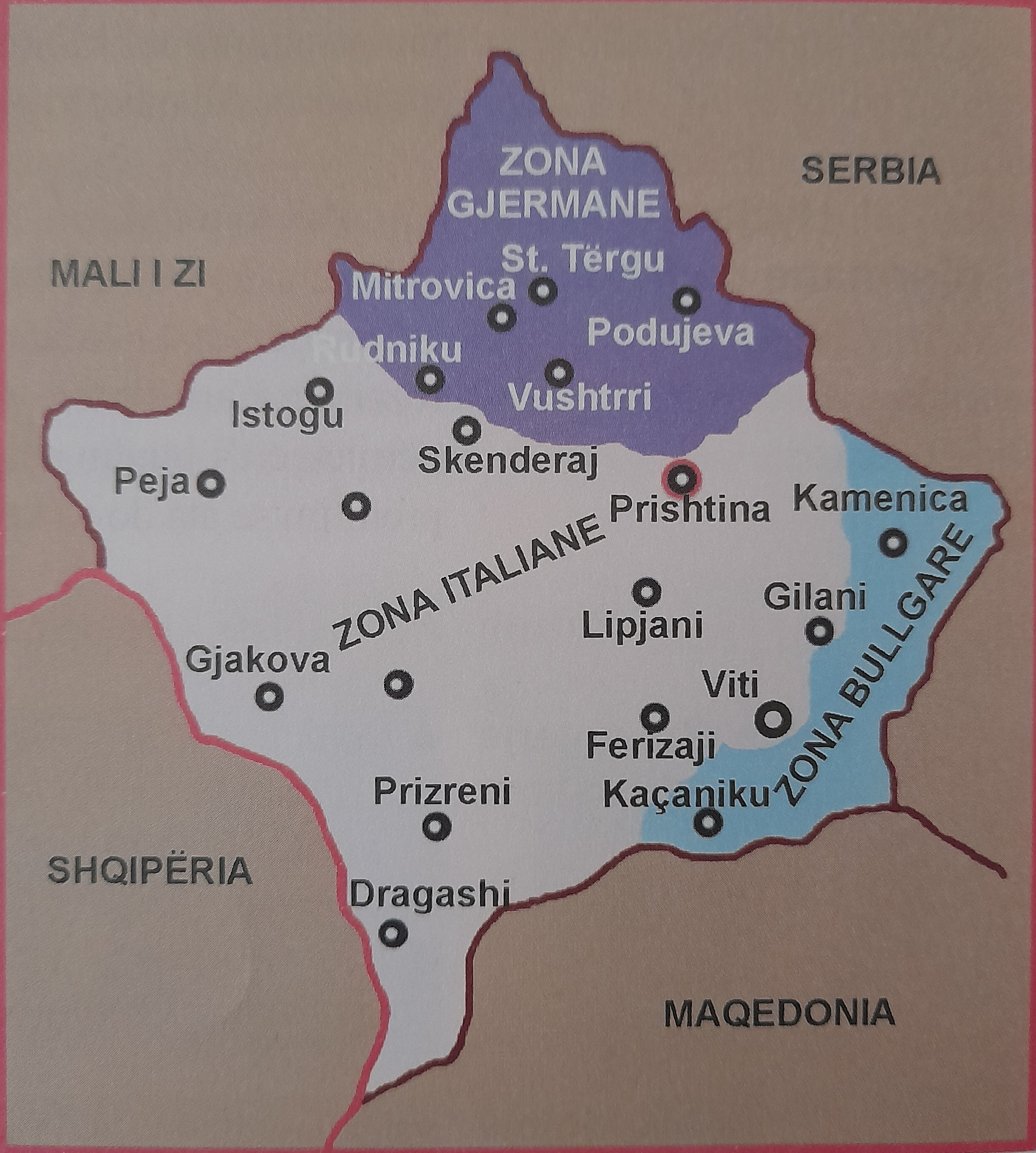
During World War II, Mitrovica was part of the German occupation zone.

During World War II, it took the Germans one week to conquer the whole of Kosovo. Kosovo was then divided into three occupation zones specifically into the German, Italian and Bulgarian zones. The Germans, however, reserved the right to control the mines in Mitrovica, namely the Trepça Mines, and the railway line passing through Kosovo. Mitrovica became the head of an Austrian infantry division. The city was part of Territory of the Military Commander in Serbia. In 1948, Mitrovica had a population of 13,901 and in the early 1990s of about 75,000.

=== Kosovo war and city division ===
Both the town and municipality were badly affected by the 1999 Kosovo War. According to the Organization for Security and Cooperation in Europe (OSCE), the area had been the scene of guerrilla activity by the Kosovo Liberation Army (KLA) prior to the war. It came under the command of NATO's French sector; by the end of October 1999, 2,949 French KFOR personnel were deployed in the municipality of Mitrovica. The larger northern sector contingent numbered 9,208 KFOR troops formed around a base of French troops, but also included contingents from Belgium, Denmark, the United Arab Emirates and Russia.

Most of the approximately 6,000 Roma fled to Serbia, or were relocated to one of two resettlement camps, Cesmin Lug, or Osterode, in North Mitrovica. Almost all of the Serbs living on the south bank were displaced to North Mitrovica after the Kosovo War.

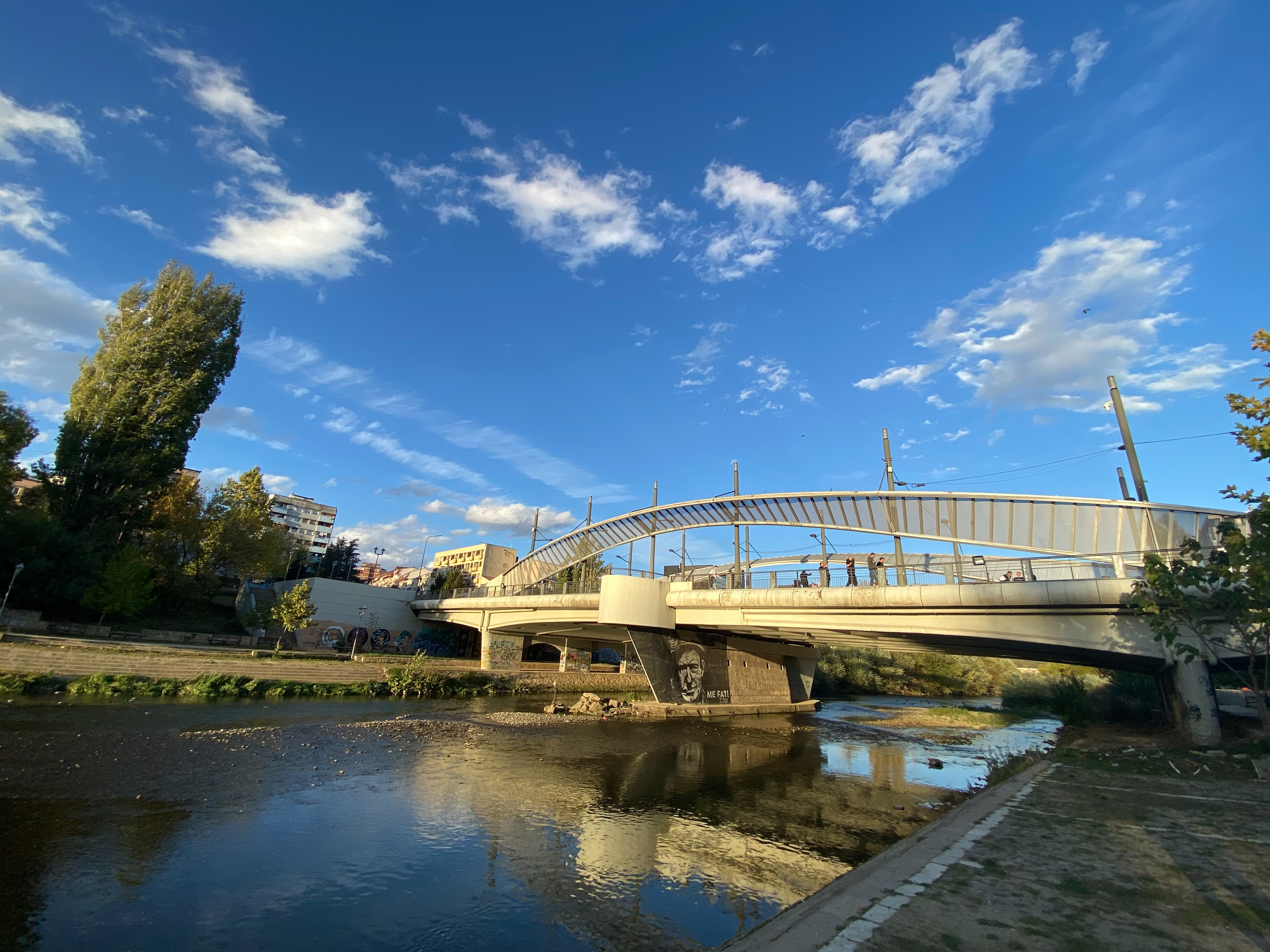
Bridge over the Ibar, which connects the city's north and south municipalities (2023)

Mitrovica became the focus for ethnic clashes between the two communities, exacerbated by the presence of nationalist extremists on both sides. The bridges linking the two sides of the town were guarded by armed groups determined to prevent incursions by the other side. Because of the tense situation in the town, KFOR troops and the United Nations Interim Administration Mission in Kosovo (UNMIK) police reinforced their presence there. However, violence and harassment was often directed against members of the "wrong" ethnic community on both sides of the river, necessitating the presence of troops and police checkpoints around individual areas of the city and even in front of individual buildings.

On 17 March 2004, the drowning of three Albanian children in the river prompted major ethnic violence in the town and a Serbian teenager was killed. Demonstrations by thousands of angry Albanians and Serbs mobilised to stop them crossing the river degenerated into rioting and gunfire, leaving at least eight Albanians dead and at least 300 injured. The bloodshed sparked off the worst unrest in Kosovo seen since the end of the 1999 war (in which 16 Serbs were killed). The local prison was the scene of an international incident on 18 April 2004 when a Jordanian policeman working as a UN prison guard opened fire on a group of UN police officers leaving a class, killing three.

=== After Kosovo's independence ===
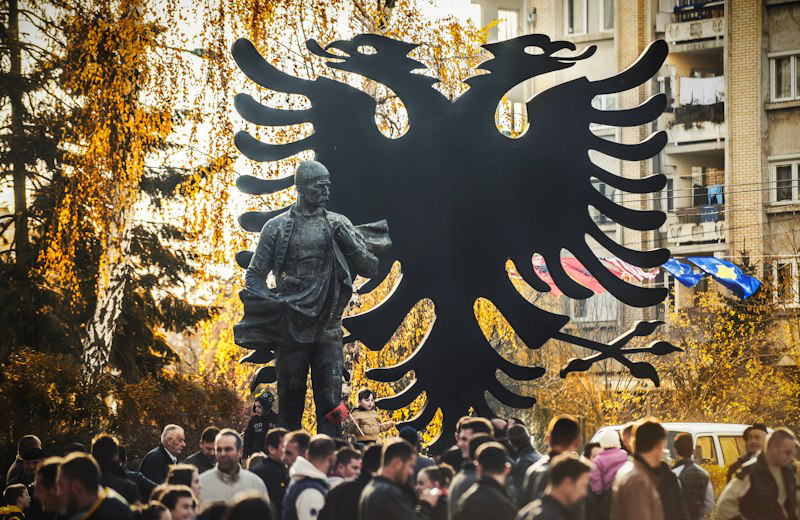
Isa Boletini statue in the centre of Mitrovica inaugurated during the 100th anniversary of the independence of Albania.

Tensions rose considerably in the city of Mitrovica after Kosovo declared independence on 17 February 2008. Some 150 Kosovo Serb police officers refused to take orders from the ethnic Albanian authorities and were suspended. Serb protesters prevented ethnic Albanian court employees from crossing the bridge over the Ibar River. UN police raided and seized the courthouse on 14 March using tear gas against Serbs and leaving some of them wounded. The explosion of a hand-grenade injured several UN and NATO staff on 17 March; UN forces were later withdrawn from the northern part of Mitrovica.

The Serbian minority initially formed the Community Assembly of Kosovo and Metohija in the city, but it has no police force. Serbs refused to accept the jurisdiction of Kosovo courts.

Kosovar leaders have expressed concern over the future of the region, stating their commitment to keep Mitrovica part of Kosovo and prevent crime or war there. With the 2013 Brussels Agreement Kosovo Serbs accepted the Pristina-run police force and courts and vote on ballots with republic of Kosovo logos. Elected Serbs swear oaths to Republic of Kosovo.

Since 2012 the northern and the southern part of the city, and in particular the New Bridge over the Ibar River are patrolled 24/7 by Italian Carabinieri from KFOR-MSU.

== Demography ==
Historical population
Year	Pop.	±%
1948	32,800	—
1953	38,716	+18.0%
1961	50,747	+31.1%
1971	71,357	+40.6%
1981	87,531	+22.7%
1991	104,885	+19.8%
2011	84,235	−19.7%
2024	72,662	−13.7%

The city of Mitrovica in 2024 had 72,662 inhabitants, 64,742 of which were living in the southern municipality, while 7,920 in North Mitrovica municipality. Kosovo Agency of Statistics, in cooperation with international experts, has evaluated the population in the four Serb-majority municipalities of North Kosovo. This assessment was necessary due to a significant boycott of the census, driven by calls from Serbian political entities. Based on this evaluation, North of Mitrovica in 2024 had 7,920 inhabitants.

According to KAS, in 2011, 58,458 inhabitants were living in the urban area of the city: 46,132 of them in southern municipality, 12,326 in the north.

The Kosovo war and post-war conflicts, the destruction of economy, especially the operating stoppage of industrial sector, as well as other socio-economic factors, have influenced high emigration (both internal and external). After 1948 (32,800 inhabitants) the city had continual high population growth tripling by 1991 to 104,885 inhabitants, but in 2011 only 84,235 inhabitants were living in Mitrovica, a decrease of 19.29% from 1991.

In 2015, a wave of mass migration of approximately 100,000 Kosovo people occurred towards Western Europe with the total population of Kosovo declining by almost 5%. During this period, 4,889 people fled south Mitrovica, which resulted in a population decline to 68,400 inhabitants. By 2015 the population of North Mitrovica municipality slightly increased to 12,223 inhabitants. In total, according to Kosovo Agency of Statistics estimation, at the end of 2015, 80,623 people were living in the city of Mitrovica.

=== Ethnic groups ===
Mitrovica as a whole is characterized with a large ethnic diversity, dominated by Albanians and followed by Serbs, Ashkali, Bosniaks, Roma, Turks, and other ethnic groups. In 2024 census conducted by Kosovo Agency of Statistics, in both municipalities of Mitrovica live 72,662 inhabitants.

According to 2024 census, in south municipality of Mitrovica, of 64,742 inhabitants Albanians made 96.8%, while other ethnic groups were Ashkali, Roma, Bosniaks Turks, Egyptians, Serbs, Gorani and others. Only 18 Serbs lived in south Mitrovica municipality in 2024.

Based on the evaluation of the population in the four Serb-majority municipalities of North Kosovo, North of Mitrovica in 2024 had 7,920 inhabitants, of which, 5,594 were Serbian, 1,489 were Albanian, 360 Bosniaks, 104 Gorani, 85 Turks, 29 Ashkali, 1 Roma, and 221 others.

Ethnic composition in South Mitrovica, 2024
Group	Population	Percentage
Albanians	62,693	96.8%
Ashkali	1,012	1.56%
Roma	372	0.57%
Bosniaks	278	0.42%
Turks	257	0.39%
Egyptians	47	0.07%
Serbs	18	0.02%
Gorani	10	0.01%
Other (specify)	43	0.06%
Prefer not to answer	12	0.01%
Total	64,742	100%

Ethnic composition in North Mitrovica, 2024
Group	Population	Percentage
Serbs	5,594	70.6%
Albanians	1,489	18.8%
Bosniaks	360	4.54%
Gorani	104	1.31%
Turks	85	1.07%
Ashkali	29	0.36%
Roma	1	0.01%
Other (specify)	221	2.79%
Prefer not to answer	37	0.46%
Total	7,920	100%

=== Religion ===
The main religious group is Muslim. Small numbers of Serbian Orthodox and Roman Catholics exist in the city. Albanians, Bosniaks, Turks, Roma and other smaller ethnic groups are mainly Muslim.

In the results of 2024 census, 64,187 people of 64,742 or 99.14%% of total population of southern municipality of Mitrovica, were Muslims. Catholic Christians comprised 54 or 0.083% of total population of municipality, while Orthodox Christians comprised 17 or 0.026%.

The 2024 population of North Mitrovica is only generally estimated by the Kosovo Agency of Statistics, as most residents did not participate in the census. For religious affiliation, however, the Agency notes that the northern municipalities (Leposaviq, Zveçan, Zubin Potok, and North Mitrovica) were not included in the published data, so no official municipal-level statistics are available.

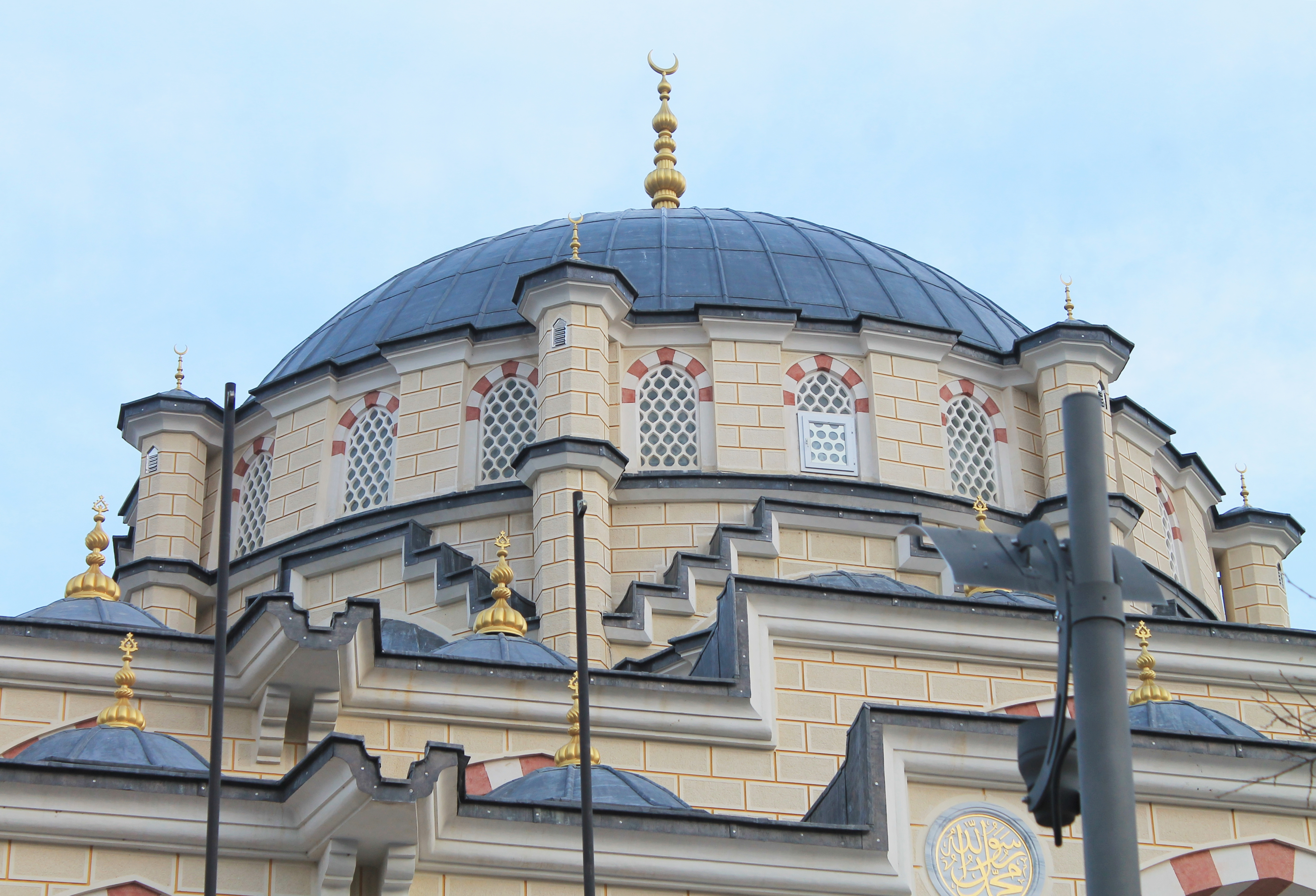
Isa Beg's Mosque (locally known as Sand's Mosque) in South Mitrovica

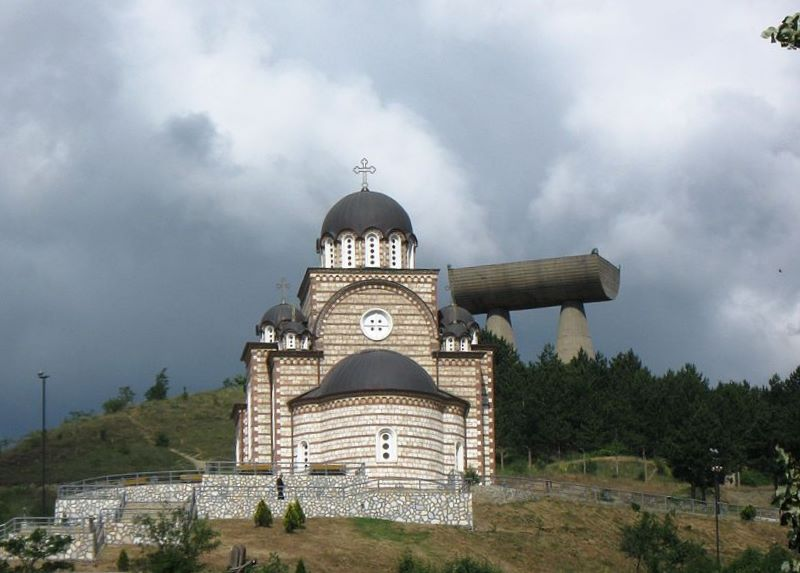
St. Demetrius Serbian Orthodox Church in North Mitrovica

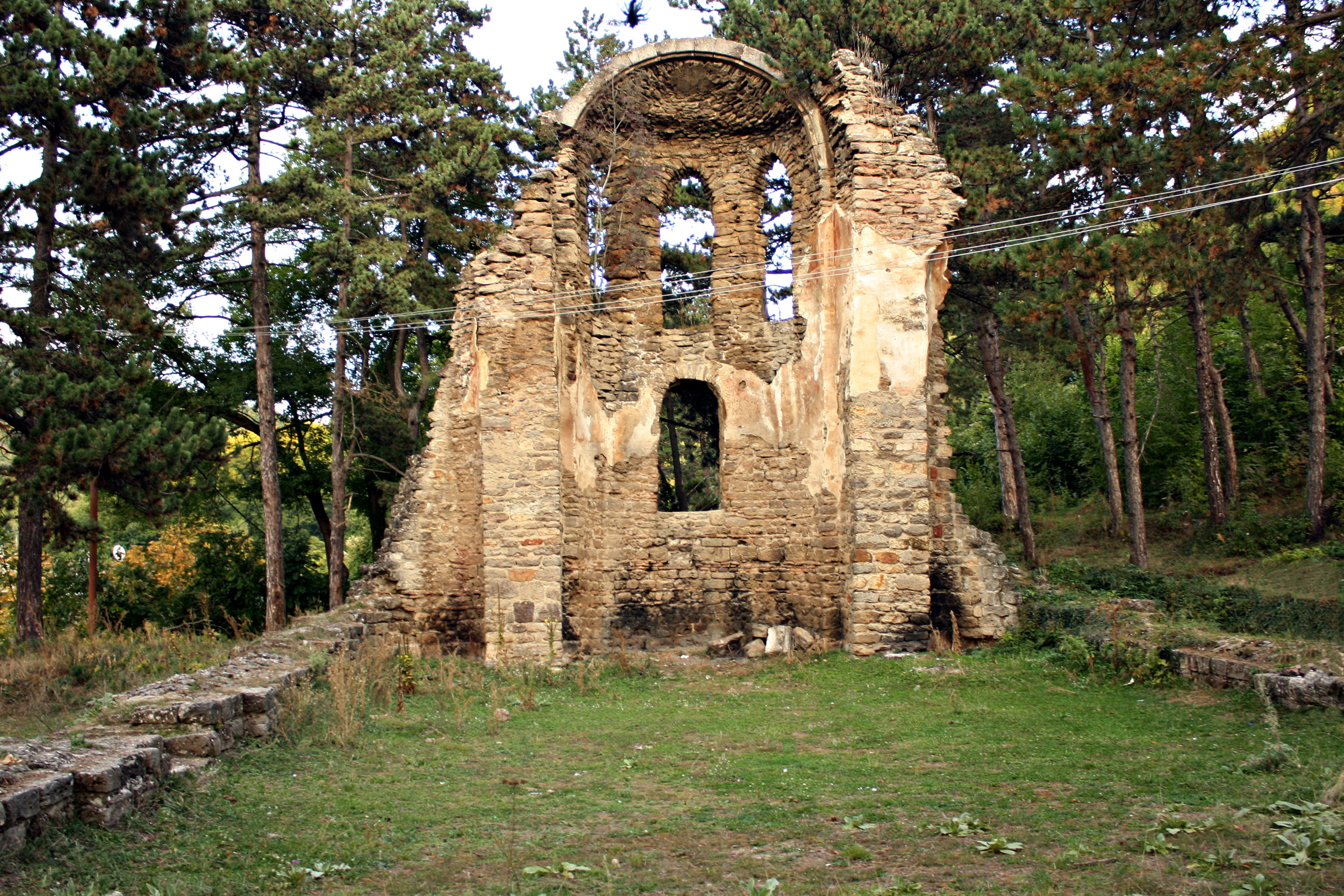
Ruins of St. Peter's Basilica Church near Mitrovica

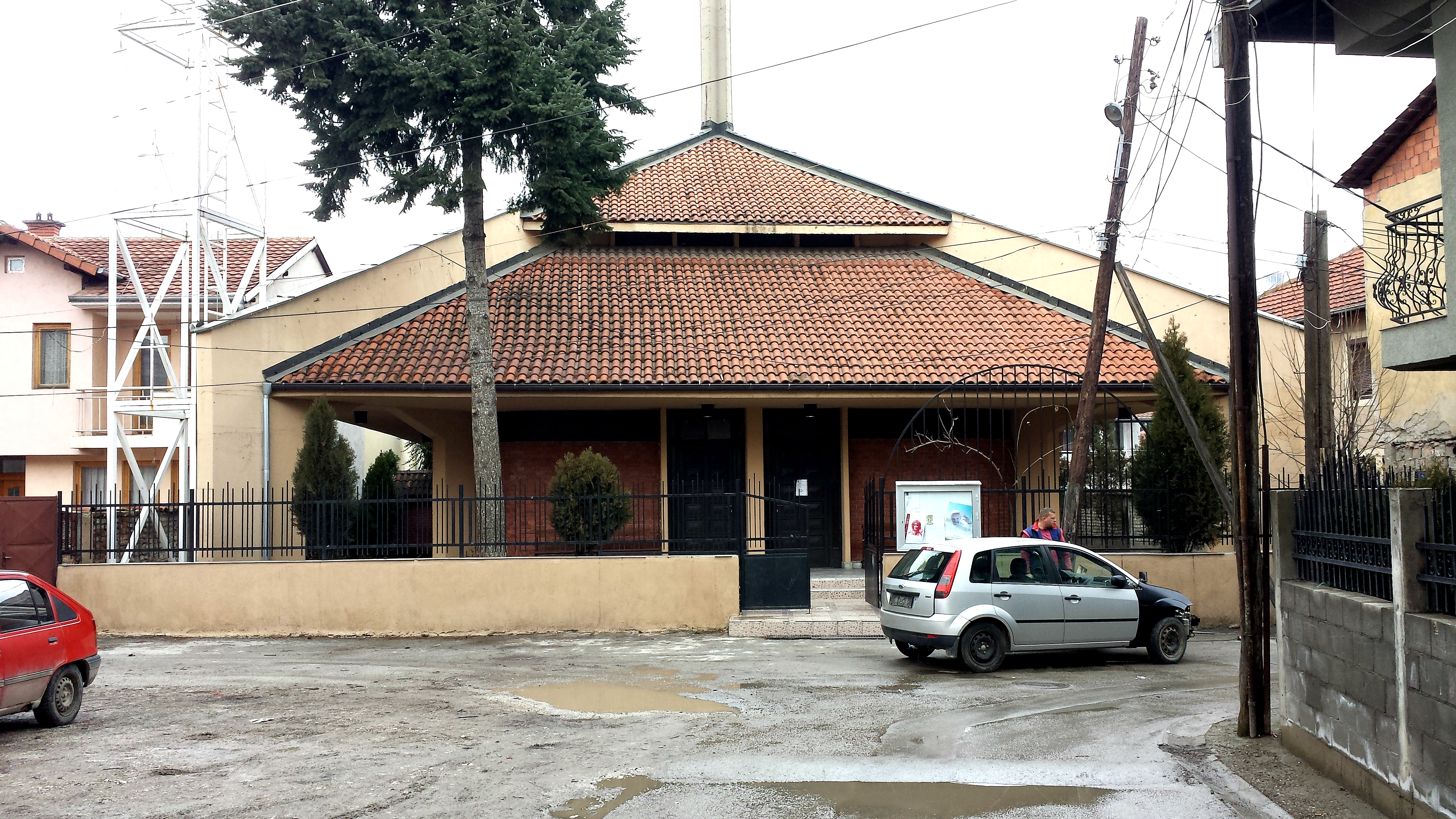
Albanian Catholic Church in southern part of Mitrovica

== Economy ==
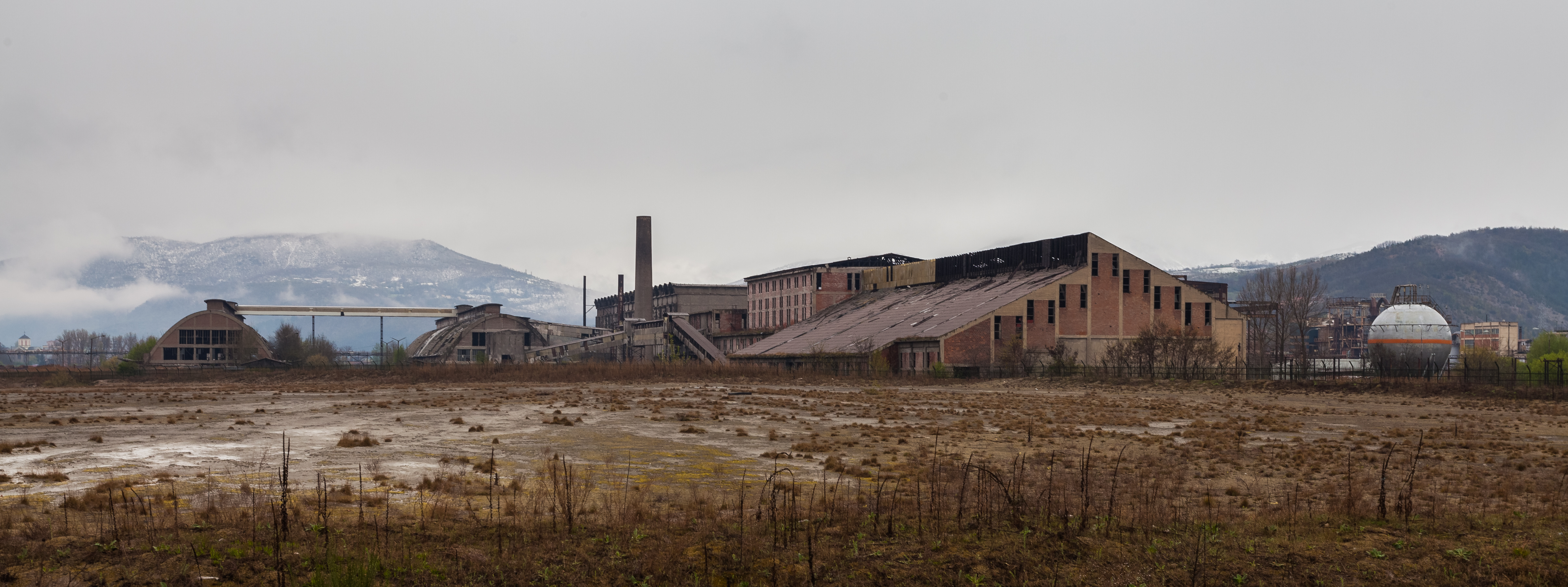
Abandoned factory in Mitrovica.

The Trepça Mines are located in Mitrovica. Once one of Europe's largest mines, its production has since dwindled and most of its operations closed off following the war. Due to Mitrovica's political instability and divisions between the Albanian and Serb communities, the city's unemployment rate is 65%. Publicly owned enterprises and local administration is largely responsible for the functioning of the economy, along with Serbian government assistance and EU donations.

== Infrastructure ==
=== Education ===
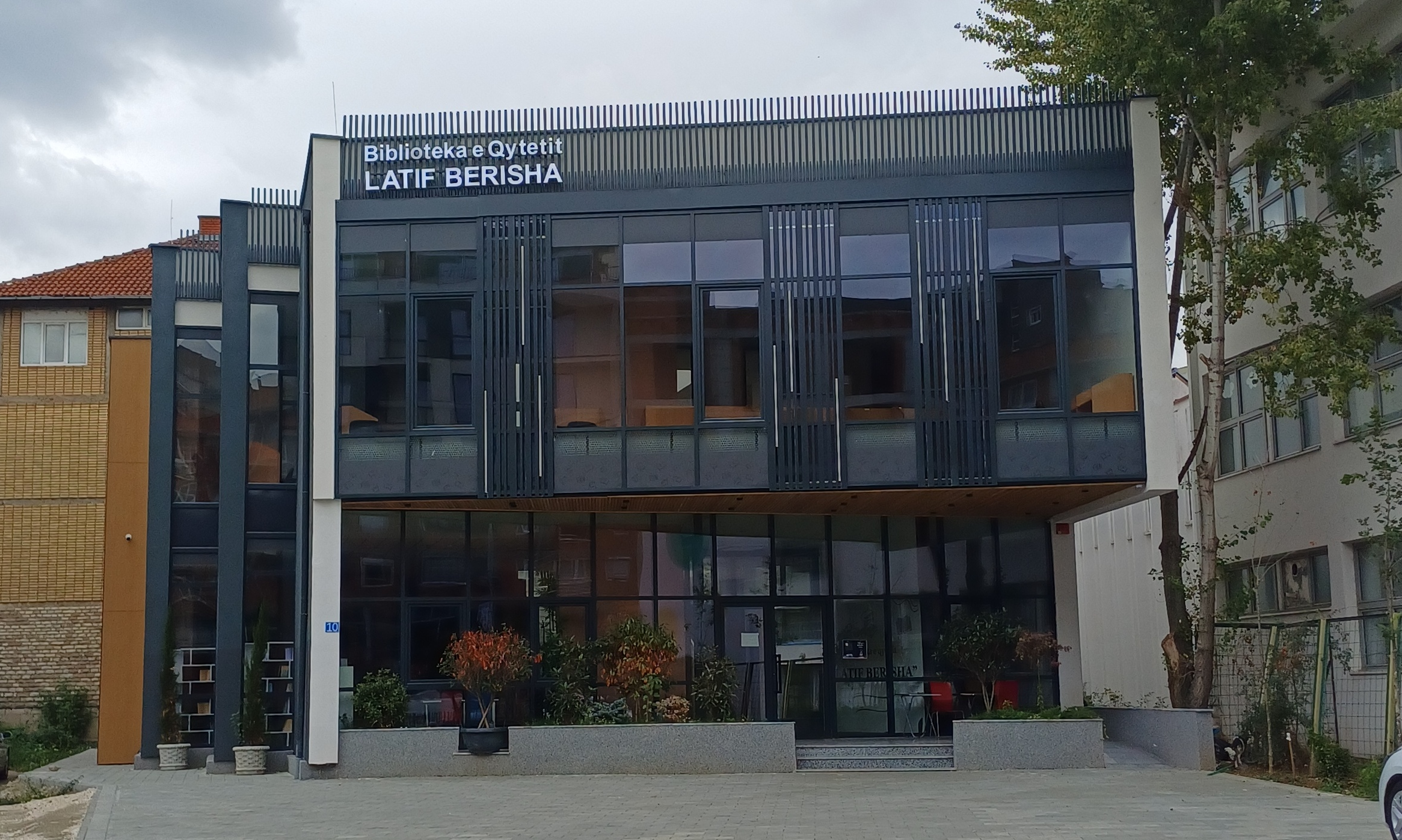
City's library "Latif Berisha"

In the southern municipality of Mitrovica there are 31 primary and lower secondary schools, which, since some of the schools function in separate parallels in different areas, operate in 42 educational facilities. In the southern municipality exists also 5 upper secondary schools. Although there is only one kindergarten, it has a large capacity, available for 300 kids. The higher education is also provided through the Public University of Mitrovica "Isa Boletini" and University of Applied Sciences. In North Mitrovica there are 11 primary schools, four secondary schools and one kindergarten.

Regarding the higher education institutions:

• The public University of Pristina is functional. It hold the name University of Priština after the Serbian faculties of the University of Pristina were relocated from Pristina to North Mitrovica after the Kosovo War. However, many institutions refer to it as University of Mitrovica, including UNMIK and EUA.
• The public International Business College Mitrovica (IBC-M) with 2 campuses, in both municipalities of Mitrovica. IBC-M was founded in 2010 and became public in July 2023 after the formal ratification of its new status by the Kosovo Parliament.
• The private college "Fama" in South-Mitrovica.

=== Energy ===
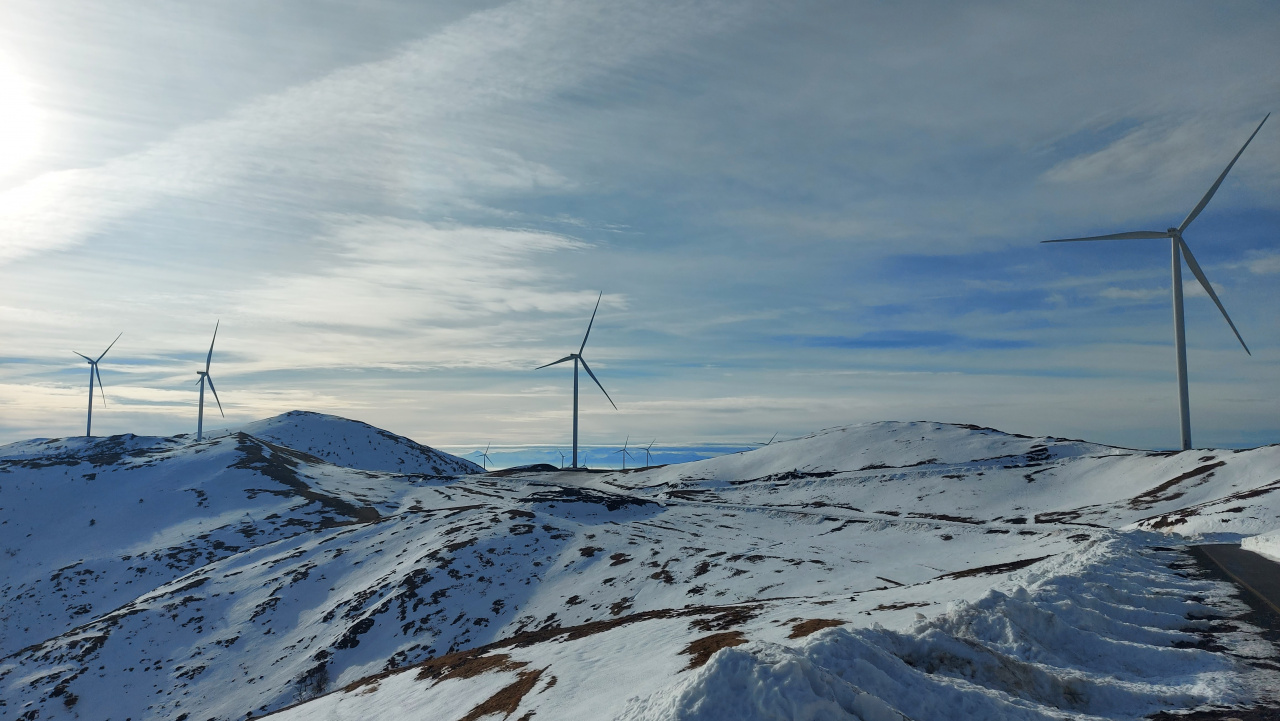
A few of the 27 wind turbines of the Bajgora Wind Farm located in the Shala e Bajgorës.

The Bajgora Wind Farm is located in the village of Bajgorë in Mitrovica. It is the largest wind farm in Kosovo consisting of 27 turbines, with a total installed capacity of 102.6 MW. The wind farm produces approximately 320 GWh of electricity annually and it costed around €157 million.

== Culture ==
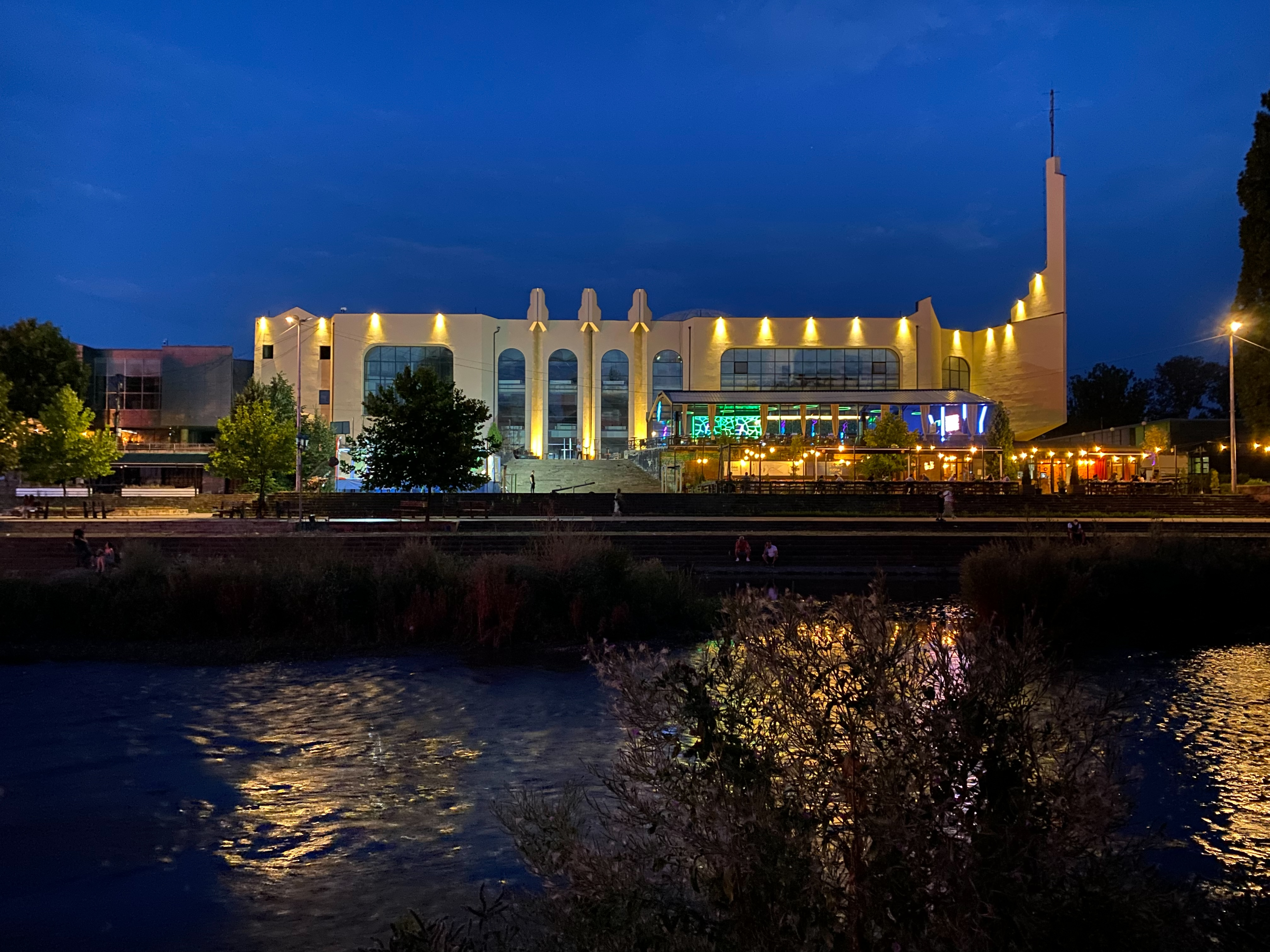
Culture Center "Rexhep Mitrovica"

Mitrovica is one of the most important cultural centers in Kosovo. The city has the Cultural Center "Rexhep Mitrovica", City Library "Latif Berisha",City Museum of Mitrovica, the Professional City Theater, various ensembles, several galleries, and alternative social/cultural spaces. Additionally, it is home to many sports clubs and venues, including the Adem Jashari Olympic Stadium, Riza Lushta Stadium, Fatime Xhaka Stadium, Minatori Sports Hall and Omni Sports Center.

In the village of Stantërg, the National Museum of Crystals and Minerals is located with over 2000 exhibits of various types of crystals from the mines of the area.

The municipality of Mitrovica has seven public libraries with a collection of 152,858 books. The main library of Mitrovica has collections of 111,546, while the branch libraries have 41,312 books. The war and violent Serbian measures during the 1990s have damaged the libraries of this city in Bare, Vllahi, Banjë and Ibër with 27,061 books.

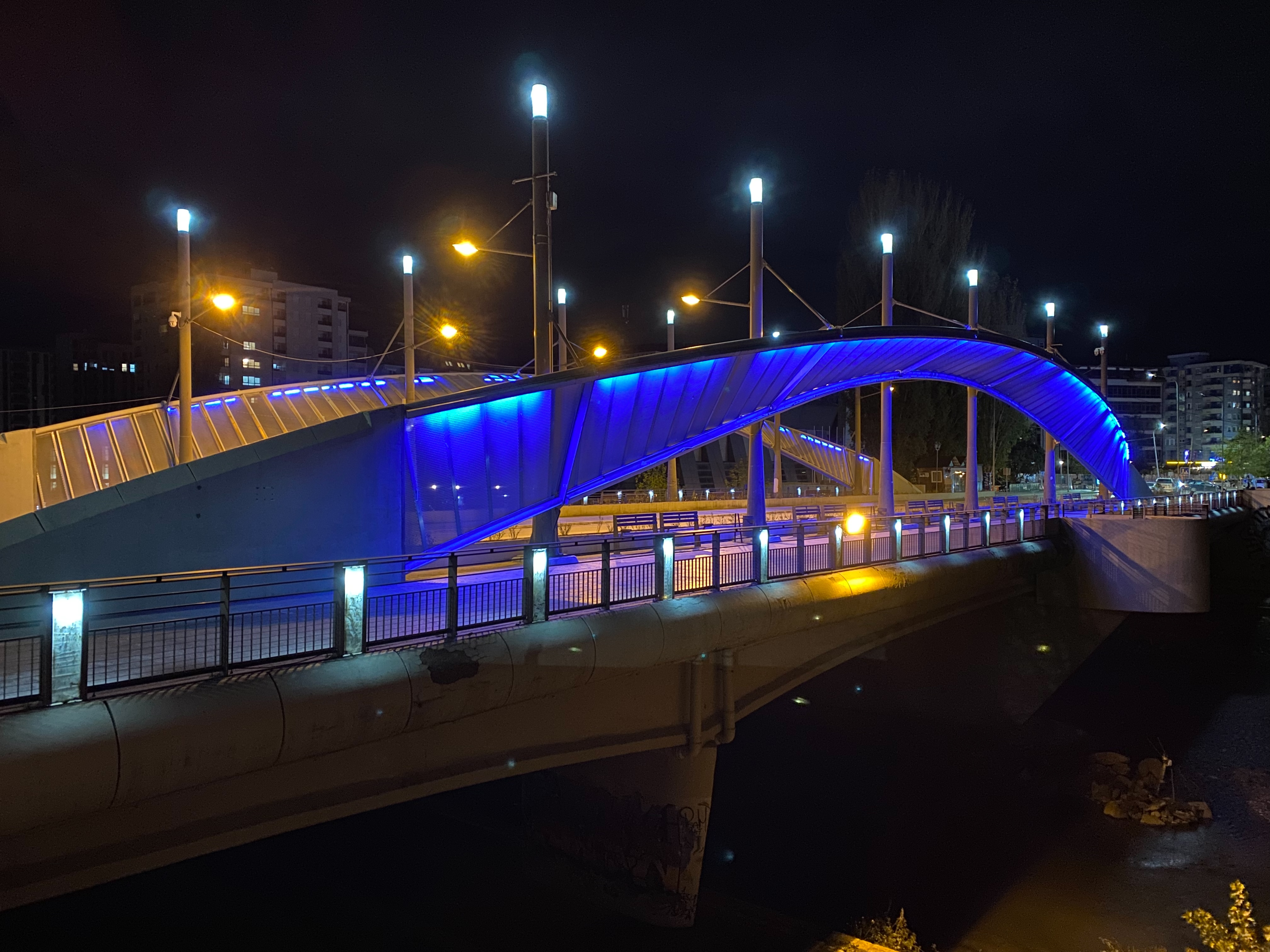
Nightview of Mitrovica Bridge, that has become a symbol of division

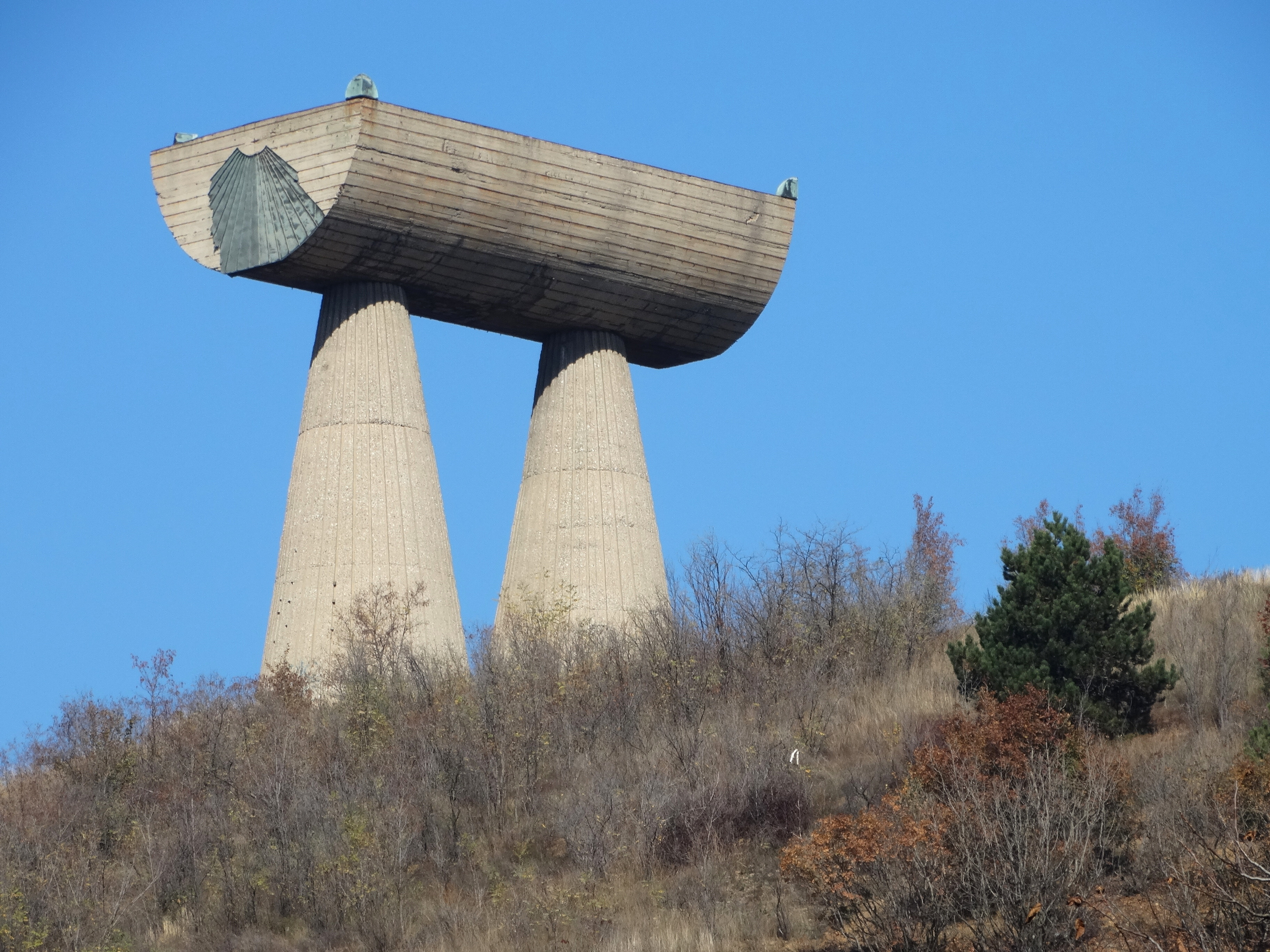
WWII Miners Monument

Among the most important historical monuments in the region are the 13th century remains of St. Peter's Catholic Church, the 14th century monasteries of Banjska and Sokolica, and the mosque of Mazhiq, Zveçan Fortress and Rashan and Isa Boletini Towers Complex, all located outside of the city. In the city several buildings from the past few centuries have remained, such as the former Jadran Hotel building, the house of Xhafer Deva, the Ottoman period city hamam, the house of Koroglu Family, several house buildings of Xhafer Deva, the former Jadran Hotel, the cultural house, and the Miners Monument.Ura e Ibrit has become a symbol of division and the city's main landmark.

=== Sights ===
The strategic position of the region of Mitrovica in the middle of two great rivers Ibar and Sitnica and its mineral wealth in Albanik (Monte Argentarum), made this location populated since prehistoric period. This region was populated by Illyrians, respectively Dardan tribe. The first data for the archaeological sites in the region of Mitrovica, begin with the researches of Sir Arthur John Evans, who was the first to pinpoint the Roman town of the Municipium Dardanorum.

In the archaeological sites of the region of Mitrovica were found traces and objects from different periods such as; Neolithic, Roman, late antiquity and medieval period. Objects and figurines include: fortress vestiges, necropolis, Terpsichore figure, statues, sarcophagus, altar, jewellery, etc.

=== Sports ===
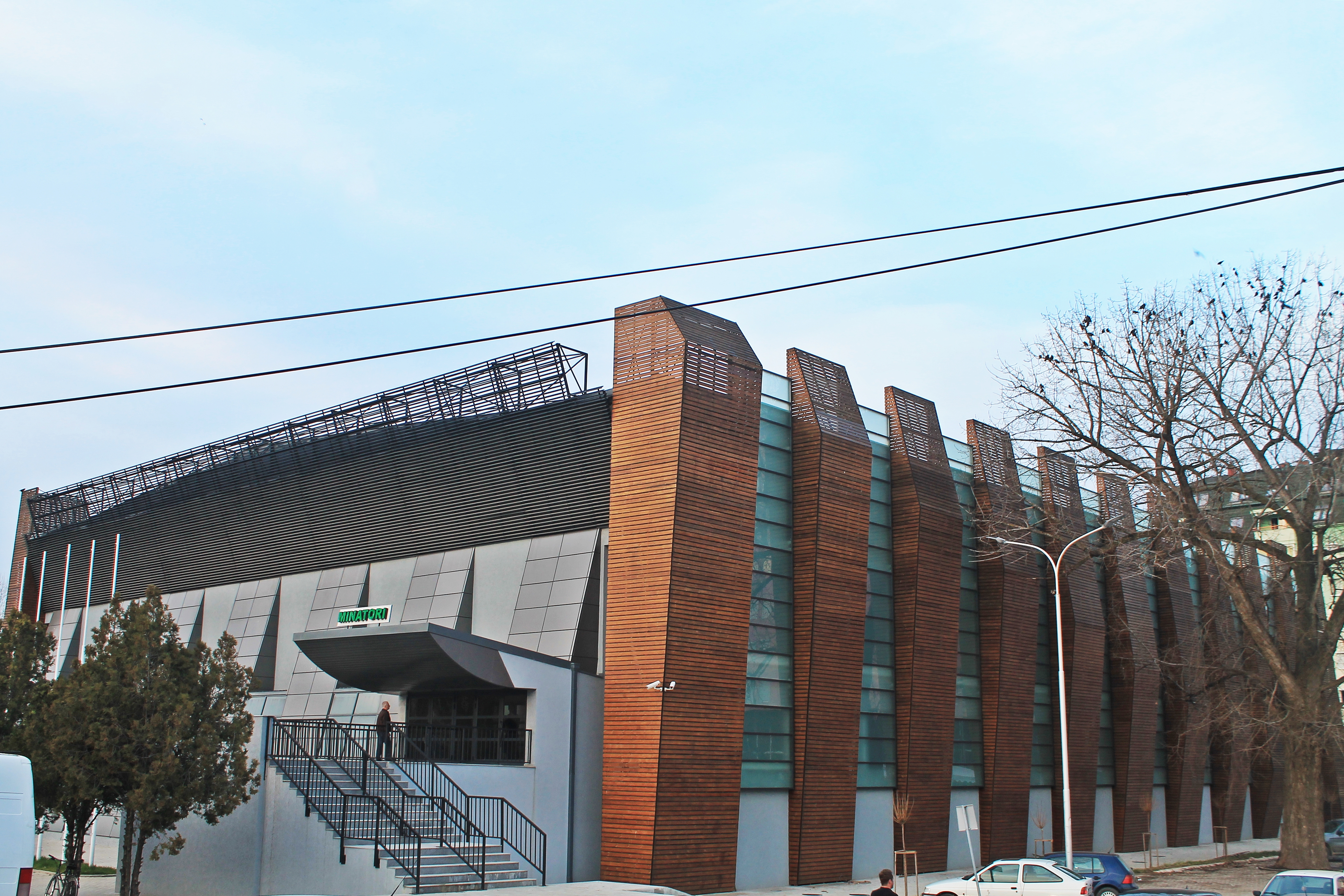
Minatori Sports Hall

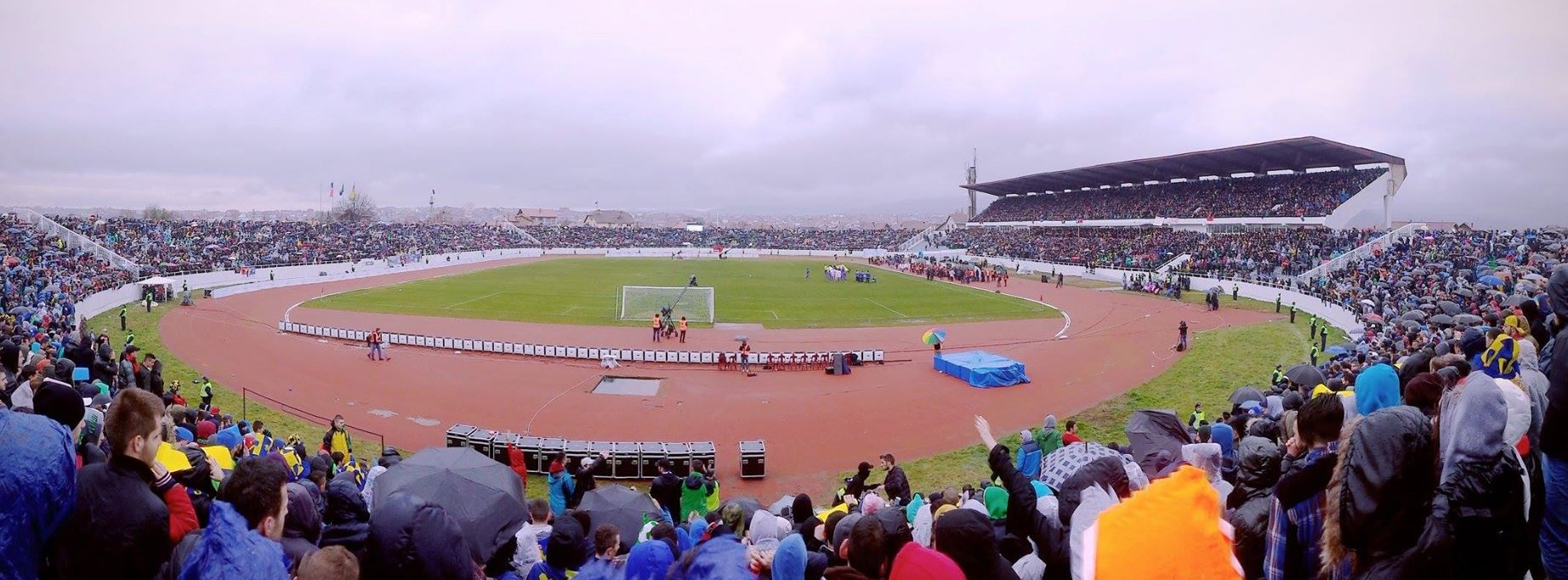
Adem Jashari Olympic Stadium

Mitrovica is the home to several sports club while the most known and most successful clubs are those representing Trepça.

Basketball is the most popular popular sport in the city and is represented by KB Trepça which is one of the top clubs in Kosovo, winning the championship regularly, as well as competing in European Competitions. KF Trepça and KF Trepça'89 (Minatori 89) the two southern club's play in the Football Superleague of Kosovo and won many titles being part of best clubs in the country. KF Trepça plays at the Adem Jashari Olympic Stadium, which hosted Kosovo's first FIFA-recognized friendly international football match on 5 March 2014, playing 0–0 against Haiti. Other active football clubs are KF Mitrovica or KF Bardhi while KF Remonti, KF Shala, KF Bashkimi Shipol, KF Elektroliza or KF Birliku are defunct clubs. The football women's club is called KFF Mitrovica and is the most successful club in the country. Handball is the third sport of Mitrovica and it's represented by KH Trepça.

== Notable people ==
- Adnan Dibrani, Albanian-Swedish politician and elected member of European Parliament
- Aleksandar Čanović, former Serbian footballer
- Alban Meha, former Albanian footballer
- Ali Shukrija, former Chairman of the Executive Council of SAP Kosovo
- Arbnor Muja, Albanian footballer
- Bajram Rexhepi, former Prime Minister of Kosovo
- Bekim Bejta, poet and translator
- Louis Boisgibault, International Professor elected to the Steering Council of International Business College - Mitrovica
- Borislav Stevanović, former Serbian footballer
- Dejzi, Albanian fashion designer
- Diana Avdiu, Miss Kosovo Universe 2012, model
- Dušan Miletić (born 1998), Serbian basketball player for Hapoel Jerusalem of the Israeli Basketball Premier League
- Enis Alushi, Albanian former footballer
- Erton Fejzullahu, former Albanian footballer
- Goran Rakić, Serbian politician, former Kosovo Deputy PM and Mayor of North Mitrovica
- Harun Beka, KLA fighter, Hero of Kosovo (posthumously)
- Ilija Vakić, former Chairman of the Executive Council of SAP Kosovo
- Isa Boletini, figure in the Albanian National Awakening
- Kadri Veseli, Albanian politician and commander, former Kosovo Assembly Speaker, former PDK leader, and one of the founders and commanders of the KLA
- MC Kresha, Albanian rapper, influential in modern music
- Milan Biševac, former Serbian footballer
- Miloš Krasić, former Serbian footballer
- Muharrem Qena, actor, musician, and cultural figure
- Musa Hoti, Albanian activist
- Nevena Božović, Serbian pop singer and Serbia's multiple-time Eurovision participant
- Nexhip Draga, Albanian nationalist and political leader
- Nikola Lazetić, former Serbian footballer
- Ramadan Çitaku, founding member of the Party of Labour of Albania
- Rexhep Mitrovica, former Prime Minister of Albania
- Riza Lushta, former Albanian footballer
- Rona Nishliu, musician, represented Albania at the Eurovision Song Contest 2012
- Shemsi Ahmeti, former KLA commander
- Stevan Stojanović, former Serbian footballer
- Sulejman Ugljanin, Bosniak political leader
- Vahedin Ajeti, Albanian former footballer
- Valdet Rama, Albanian footballer
- Valon Behrami, Albanian former footballer
- Vjosa Osmani, former President of Kosovo
- Xhafer Deva, former Minister of the Interior of Albania
- Xhevat Prekazi, former Albanian footballer
- Žarko Lazetić, former Serbian footballer

== Twin towns – sister cities ==
Mitrovica is twinned with:

- İnegöl, Turkey
- Korçë, Albania

== See also ==
- Monuments in Mitrovica
