= Narin Ammara =

Syrian YouTuber and Social media influencer

- Born: Narin Ammara; April 15, 2000 (age 26); Syria
- Other name: Narins Beauty
- Occupations: Blogger; YouTube personality

YouTube information
- Channel: Narobeauty
- Years active: 2014–present
- Genres: Beauty, Fashion
- Subscribers: 16.5 million
- Views: 2.68 billion
- Last updated: October 3, 2025

Narin Ammara (Arabic: نارين عمارة), better known as Narins Beauty, is a Swedish-Syrian YouTuber and Social media influencer based in Dubai. Narin is known for her lifestyle, fashion, beauty, and DIY content on social media.

She is also the founder of the beauty brand 'Narins Beauty'.

== Early life ==
Narin Ammara was born to Syrian parents and raised in Sweden. Narin has two older brothers and two younger sisters.

== Career ==
Narin Ammara established her YouTube channel 'Narins Beauty' 2014, mostly concentrating on cosmetic lessons and advice regarding fashion and DIY products. The hobby account turned into a job and Ammara expanded her content to include funny vlogs, viral challenges, product reviews, and lifestyle tips.

In 2025, Narin Ammara introduced her own beauty brand named 'Narins Beauty'.

== Personal life ==
In April 2025, Narin Ammara married Rami Elias Samo, an investment banker and managing director of PJT Partners, based in Dubai. Rami proposed to Narin in an official engagement celebration with close family members on November 15th, 2023.

== Awards ==
- Female Influencer of the Year 2025 at the Joy Awards in the Kingdom of Saudi Arabia
- Beauty Influencer of The Year at 2024 Emigala Awards
