= Kołoniec =

- Village
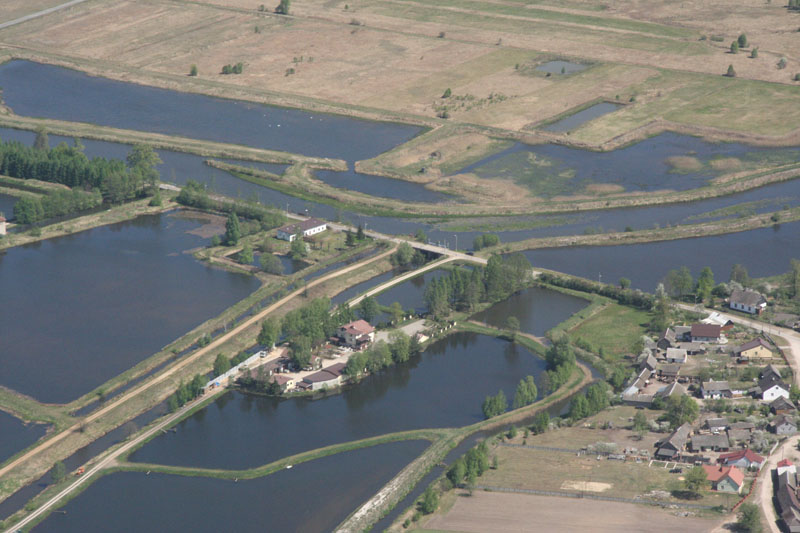

- Location within Poland
- Coordinates: 51°10′44″N 20°8′41″E
- Country: Poland
- Voivodeship: Świętokrzyskie
- County: Końskie
- Gmina: Ruda Maleniecka
- Population: 220

Kołoniec [kɔˈwɔɲɛt͡s] is a village in the administrative district of Gmina Ruda Maleniecka, within Końskie County, Świętokrzyskie Voivodeship, in south-central Poland. It lies approximately 7 km (4 mi) north-west of Ruda Maleniecka, 20 km (12 mi) west of Końskie, and 47 km (29 mi) north-west of the regional capital Kielce.
