= Strzęboszów =

- Village
- Location within Poland
- Coordinates: 51°9′11″N 20°16′39″E
- Country: Poland
- Voivodeship: Świętokrzyskie
- County: Końskie
- Gmina: Ruda Maleniecka
- Population: 90

Strzęboszów [stʂɛmˈbɔʂuf] is a village in the administrative district of Gmina Ruda Maleniecka, within Końskie County, Świętokrzyskie Voivodeship, in south-central Poland. It lies approximately 4 km (2 mi) east of Ruda Maleniecka, 12 km (7 mi) south-west of Końskie, and 39 km (24 mi) north-west of the regional capital Kielce. The village has only about 90 people, which makes it a very small rural village in Poland.
