= Wyszyna Fałkowska =

- Village
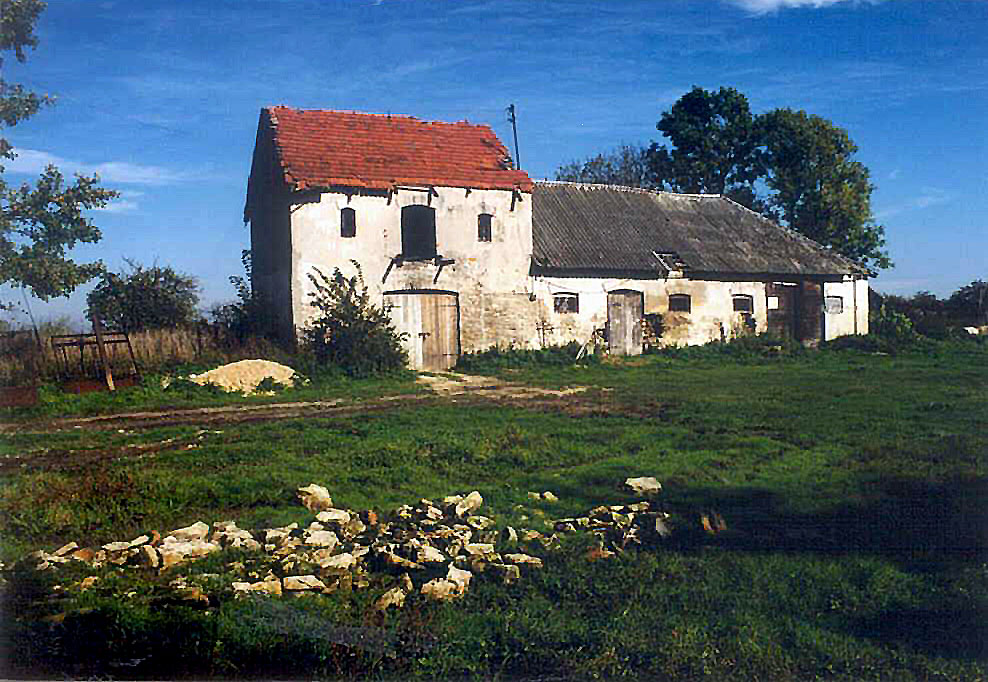

- Location within Poland
- Coordinates: 51°9′27″N 20°9′50″E
- Country: Poland
- Voivodeship: Świętokrzyskie
- County: Końskie
- Gmina: Ruda Maleniecka
- Population: 180

Wyszyna Fałkowska [vɨˈʂɨna fau̯ˈkɔfska] is a village in the administrative district of Gmina Ruda Maleniecka, within Końskie County, Świętokrzyskie Voivodeship, in south-central Poland. It lies approximately 5 km (3 mi) west of Ruda Maleniecka, 19 km (12 mi) west of Końskie, and 44 km (27 mi) north-west of the regional capital Kielce.
