= Cieklińsko =

- Village
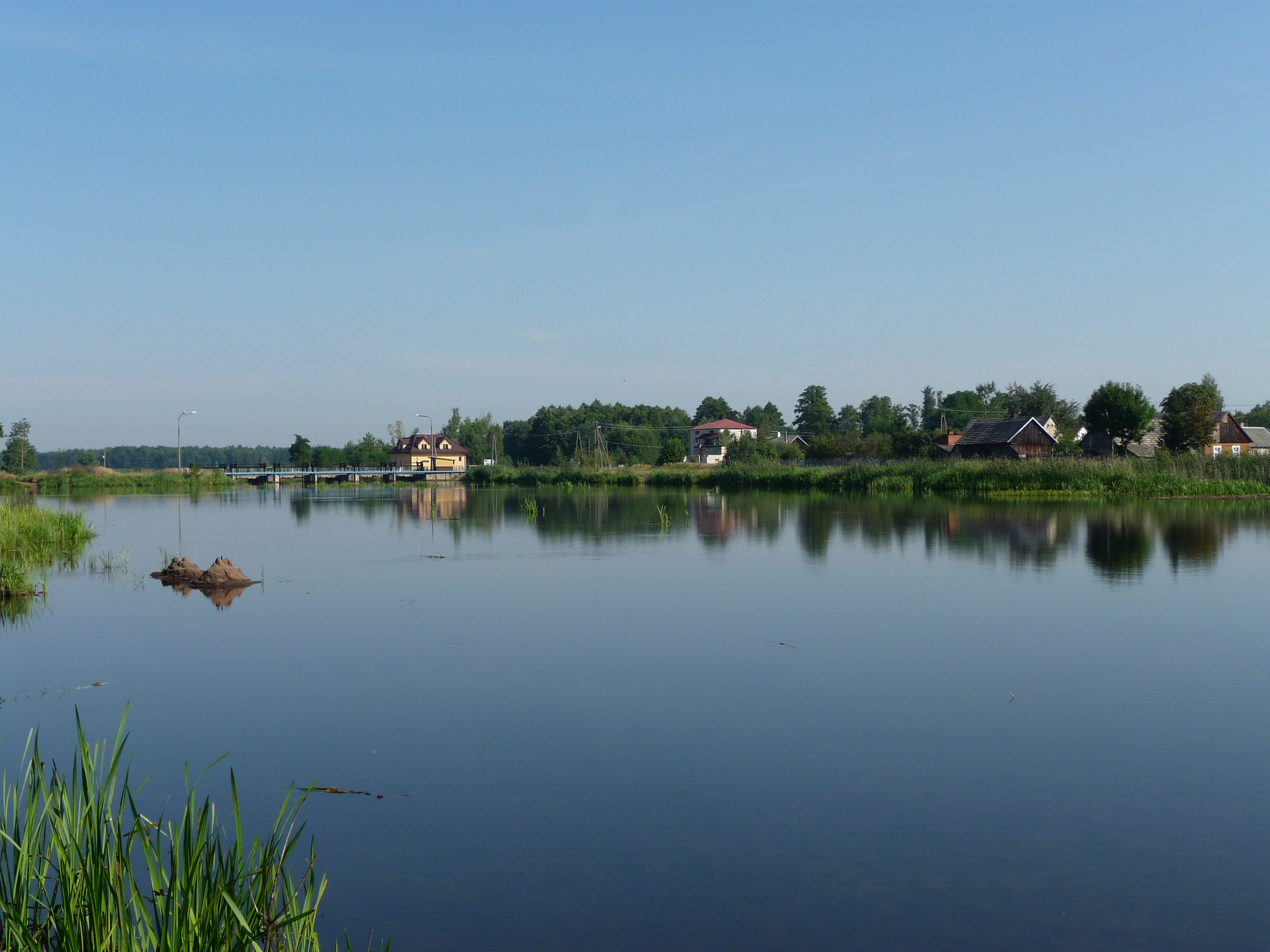

- Location within Poland
- Coordinates: 51°7′50″N 20°14′14″E
- Country: Poland
- Voivodeship: Świętokrzyskie
- County: Końskie
- Gmina: Ruda Maleniecka
- Population: 130

Cieklińsko [t͡ɕɛˈkliɲskɔ] is a village in the administrative district of Gmina Ruda Maleniecka, within Końskie County, Świętokrzyskie Voivodeship, in south-central Poland. It lies approximately 2 km (1 mi) south-east of Ruda Maleniecka, 15 km (9 mi) south-west of Końskie, and 39 km (24 mi) north-west of the regional capital Kielce.
