= Szkucin =

- Village
- Location within Poland
- Coordinates: 51°6′33″N 20°8′48″E
- Country: Poland
- Voivodeship: Świętokrzyskie
- County: Końskie
- Gmina: Ruda Maleniecka
- Population: 250

Szkucin [ˈʂkut͡ɕin] is a village in the administrative district of Gmina Ruda Maleniecka, within Końskie County, Świętokrzyskie Voivodeship, in south-central Poland. It lies approximately 7 km (4 mi) south-west of Ruda Maleniecka, 22 km (14 mi) south-west of Końskie, and 42 km (26 mi) north-west of the regional capital Kielce.
