= Hucisko, Gmina Ruda Maleniecka =

Hucisko
- Village
- Location within Poland
- Coordinates: 51°5′46″N 20°9′6″E
- Country: Poland
- Voivodeship: Świętokrzyskie
- County: Końskie
- Gmina: Ruda Maleniecka
- Population: 160

Hucisko [xuˈt͡ɕiskɔ] is a village in the administrative district of Gmina Ruda Maleniecka, within Końskie County, Świętokrzyskie Voivodeship, in south-central Poland. It lies approximately 8 km (5 mi) south-west of Ruda Maleniecka, 22 km (14 mi) south-west of Końskie, and 41 km (25 mi) north-west of the regional capital Kielce.
