= Cis, Świętokrzyskie Voivodeship =

Cis
- Village
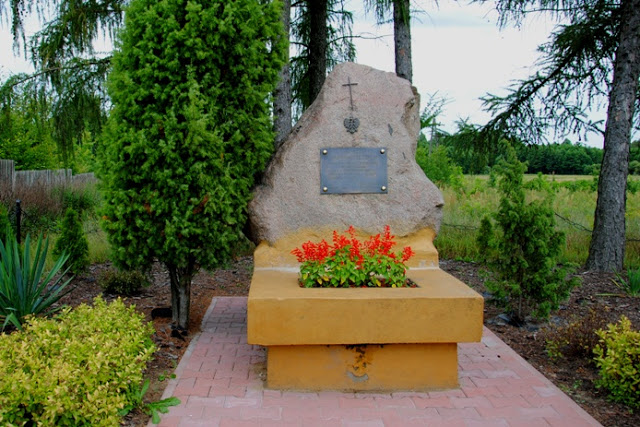

- Location within Poland
- Coordinates: 51°6′12″N 20°12′1″E
- Country: Poland
- Voivodeship: Świętokrzyskie
- County: Końskie
- Gmina: Ruda Maleniecka
- Population: 90

Cis [t͡ɕis] is a village in the administrative district of Gmina Ruda Maleniecka, within Końskie County, Świętokrzyskie Voivodeship, in south-central Poland. It lies approximately 5 km (3 mi) south of Ruda Maleniecka, 19 km (12 mi) south-west of Końskie, and 39 km (24 mi) north-west of the regional capital Kielce.
