= Młotkowice =

- Village
- Location within Poland
- Coordinates: 51°7′29″N 20°12′20″E
- Country: Poland
- Voivodeship: Świętokrzyskie
- County: Końskie
- Gmina: Ruda Maleniecka
- Population: 440

Młotkowice [mwɔtkɔˈvit͡sɛ] is a village in the administrative district of Gmina Ruda Maleniecka, within Końskie County, Świętokrzyskie Voivodeship, in south-central Poland. It lies approximately 3 km (2 mi) south-west of Ruda Maleniecka, 17 km (11 mi) south-west of Końskie, and 40 km (25 mi) north-west of the regional capital Kielce.
