= Tama, Świętokrzyskie Voivodeship =

Tama
- Village
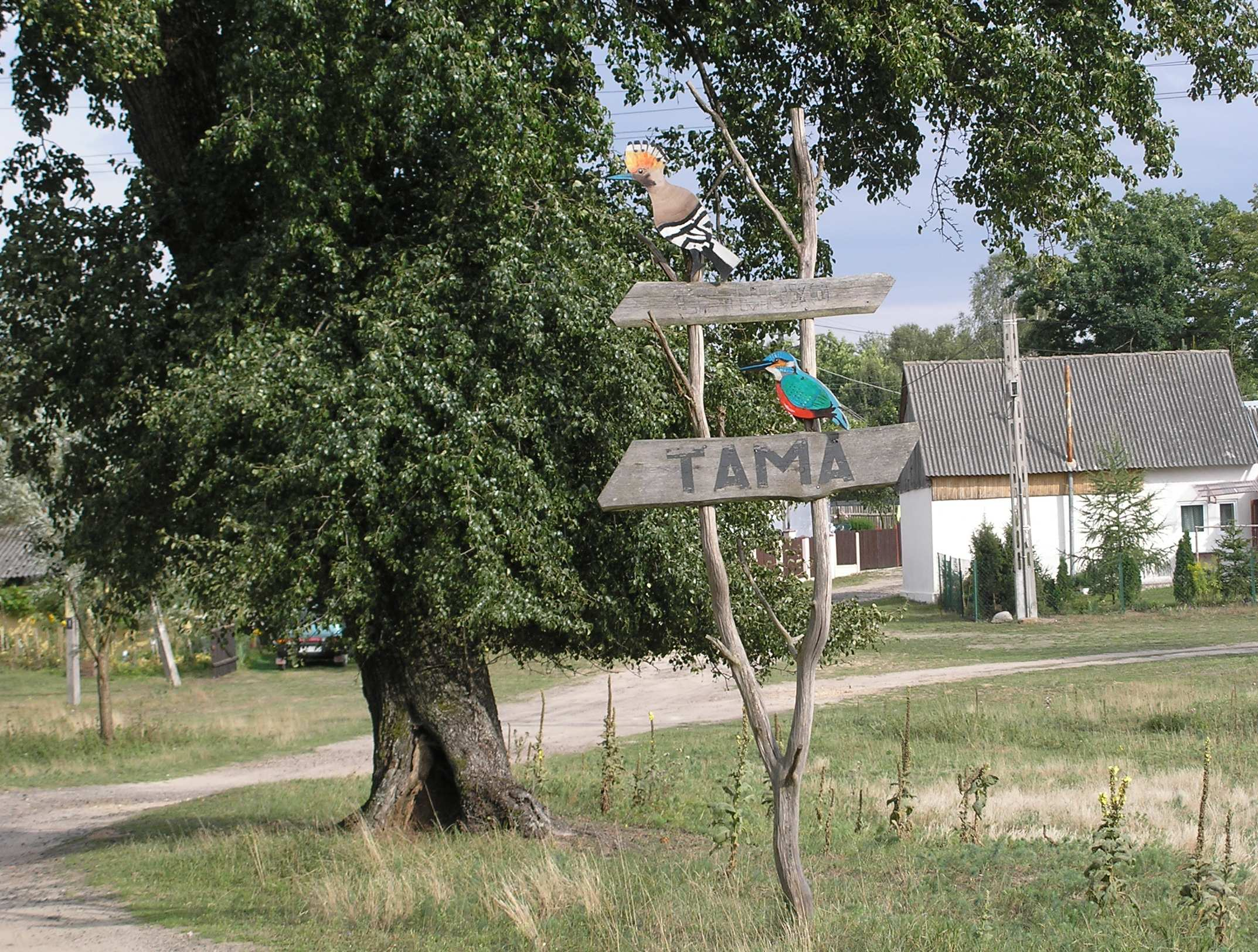

- Location within Poland
- Coordinates: 51°10′50″N 20°10′30″E
- Country: Poland
- Voivodeship: Świętokrzyskie
- County: Końskie
- Gmina: Ruda Maleniecka

Tama [ˈtama] is a village in the administrative district of Gmina Ruda Maleniecka, within Końskie County, Świętokrzyskie Voivodeship, in south-central Poland. It lies approximately 6 km (4 mi) north-west of Ruda Maleniecka, 17 km (11 mi) west of Końskie, and 46 km (29 mi) north-west of the regional capital Kielce.
