= Machory =

- Village
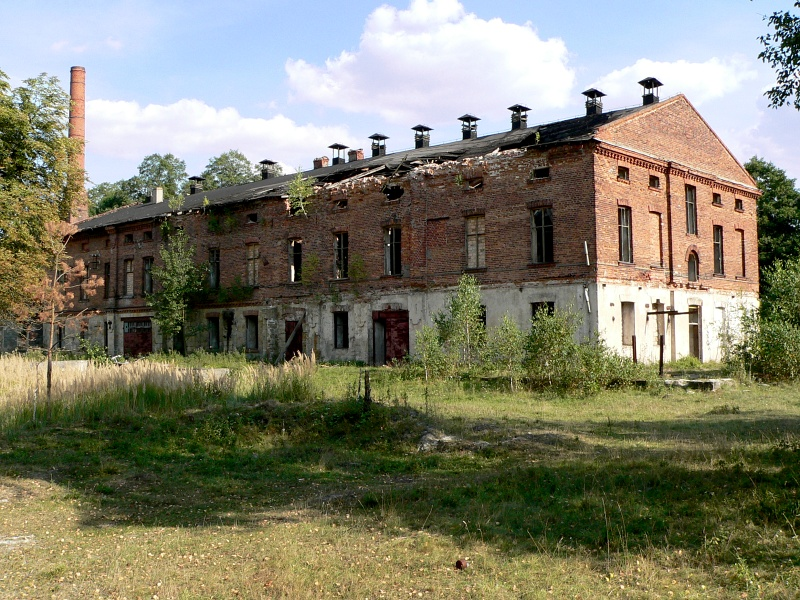

- Location within Poland
- Coordinates: 51°10′59″N 20°9′39″E
- Country: Poland
- Voivodeship: Świętokrzyskie
- County: Końskie
- Gmina: Ruda Maleniecka
- Population: 150

Machory [maˈxɔrɨ] is a village in the administrative district of Gmina Ruda Maleniecka, within Końskie County, Świętokrzyskie Voivodeship, in south-central Poland. It lies approximately 7 km (4 mi) north-west of Ruda Maleniecka, 18 km (11 mi) west of Końskie, and 47 km (29 mi) north-west of the regional capital Kielce.
