= Wyszyna Machorowska =

- Village
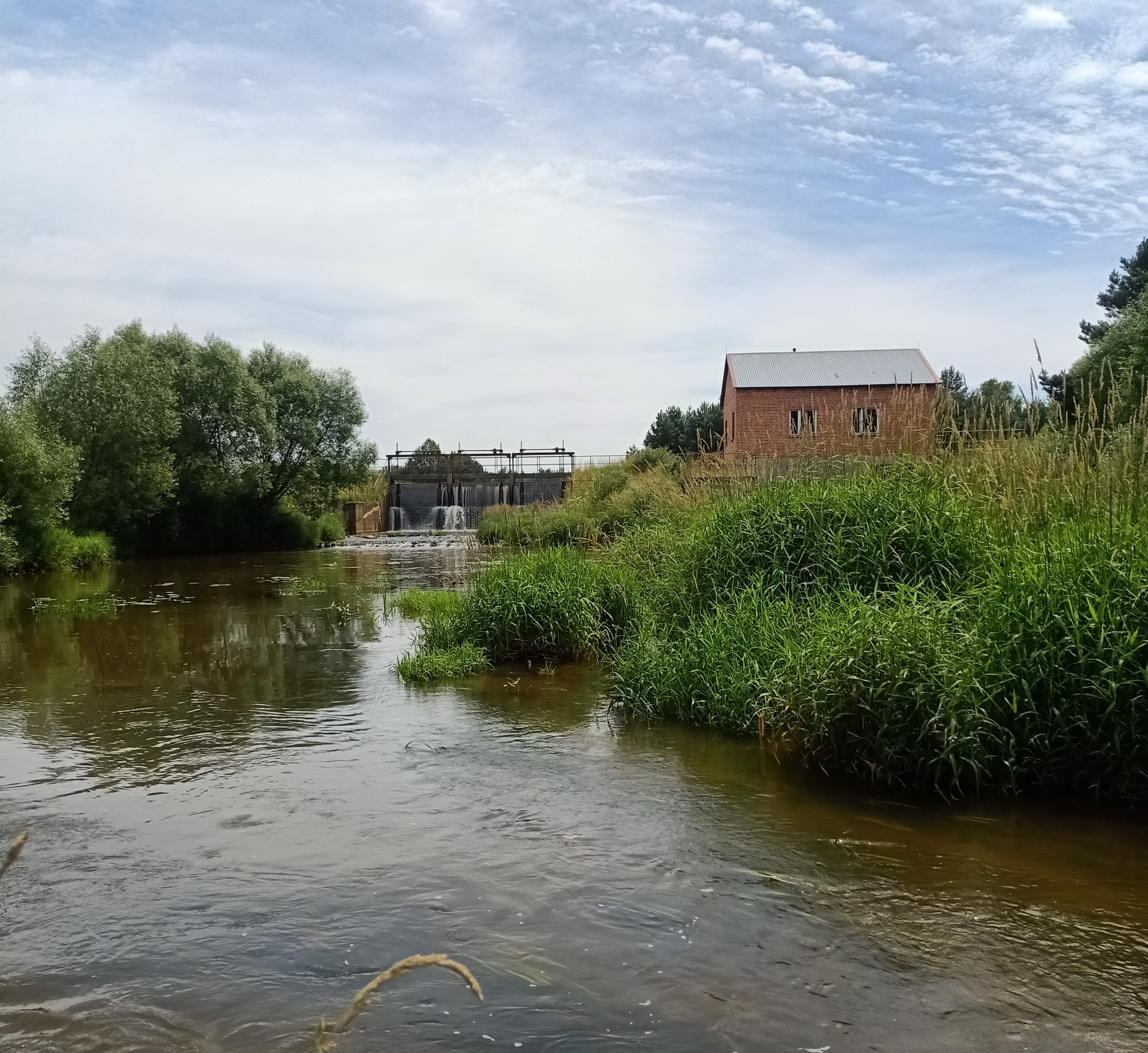
- Hydroelectric power plant

- Location within Poland
- Coordinates: 51°9′38″N 20°10′52″E
- Country: Poland
- Voivodeship: Świętokrzyskie
- County: Końskie
- Gmina: Ruda Maleniecka
- Population: 110

Wyszyna Machorowska [vɨˈʂɨna maxɔˈrɔfska] is a village in the administrative district of Gmina Ruda Maleniecka, within Końskie County, Świętokrzyskie Voivodeship, in south-central Poland. It lies approximately 4 km (2 mi) north-west of Ruda Maleniecka, 18 km (11 mi) west of Końskie, and 44 km (27 mi) north-west of the regional capital Kielce.
