= Wyszyna Rudzka =

- Village
- Location within Poland
- Coordinates: 51°9′0″N 20°11′54″E
- Country: Poland
- Voivodeship: Świętokrzyskie
- County: Końskie
- Gmina: Ruda Maleniecka
- Population: 120

Wyszyna Rudzka [vɨˈʂɨna ˈrut͡ska] is a village in the administrative district of Gmina Ruda Maleniecka, within Końskie County, Świętokrzyskie Voivodeship, in south-central Poland. It lies approximately 2 km (1 mi) west of Ruda Maleniecka, 17 km (11 mi) west of Końskie, and 42 km (26 mi) north-west of the regional capital Kielce.
