= Dęba, Świętokrzyskie Voivodeship =

Dęba
- Village
- Location within Poland
- Coordinates: 51°9′39″N 20°15′48″E
- Country: Poland
- Voivodeship: Świętokrzyskie
- County: Końskie
- Gmina: Ruda Maleniecka
- Elevation: 340 m (1,120 ft)

Dęba [ˈdɛmba] is a village in the administrative district of Gmina Ruda Maleniecka, within Końskie County, Świętokrzyskie Voivodeship, in south-central Poland. It lies approximately 4 km (2 mi) north-east of Ruda Maleniecka, 12 km (7 mi) west of Końskie, and 40 km (25 mi) north-west of the regional capital Kielce.
