= Lipa, Końskie County =

Lipa
- Village
- Location within Poland
- Coordinates: 51°6′42″N 20°10′28″E
- Country: Poland
- Voivodeship: Świętokrzyskie
- County: Końskie
- Gmina: Ruda Maleniecka
- Population: 380

Lipa [ˈlipa] is a village in the administrative district of Gmina Ruda Maleniecka, within Końskie County, Świętokrzyskie Voivodeship, in south-central Poland. It lies approximately 6 km (4 mi) south-west of Ruda Maleniecka, 20 km (12 mi) south-west of Końskie, and 41 km (25 mi) north-west of the regional capital Kielce.
