= Yisrael Kristal =

Polish-Israeli supercentenarian (1903–2017)

- ישראל קרישטל
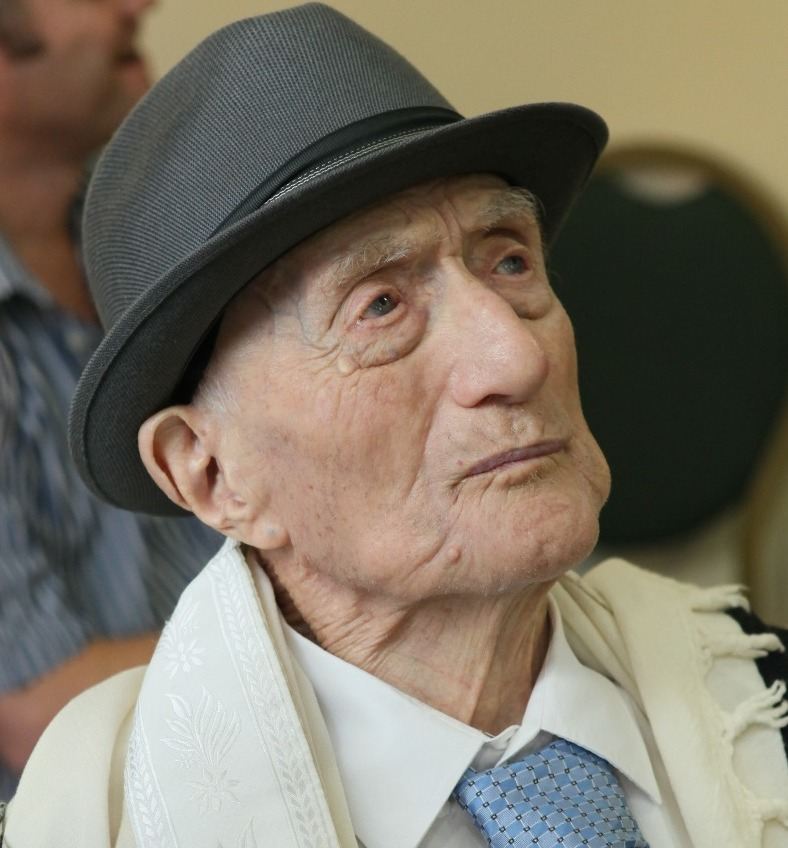
- Kristal in 2016
- Born: Izrael Icek Kryształ; 15 September 1903; Maleniec, Końskie County, Poland, Russian Empire
- Died: 11 August 2017 (aged 113 years, 330 days); Haifa, Israel
- Known for: Oldest living man (18 January 2016 – 11 August 2017); Oldest survivor of the Holocaust
- Spouse: Chaja Feige Frucht (m. 1928; died 1944) Batsheva Kristal (m. 1947; died 1993)
- Children: 4

Yisrael Kristal (or Israel Kristal; born Izrael Icek Kryształ; Hebrew: ישראל קרישטל; 15 September 1903 – 11 August 2017) was a Polish-Israeli supercentenarian recognized in 2014 as the oldest living Holocaust survivor. After the death of Yasutaro Koide, of Japan, on 18 January 2016, (Note: Yasutaro Koide died on 19 January 2016 12:17 a.m. JST. However, in Israel, where Kristal lived, the date was still 18 January 2016 (IST).) he was also recognized as the oldest living man.

Born in 1903 to religious parents in Maleniec, near Żarnów, then part of Poland of the Russian Empire, Kristal remained religiously observant all his life.

A confectioner by profession, he experienced World War I as an early teen, and World War II as an adult. After surviving the Holocaust, he emigrated to Israel.

== Early life ==
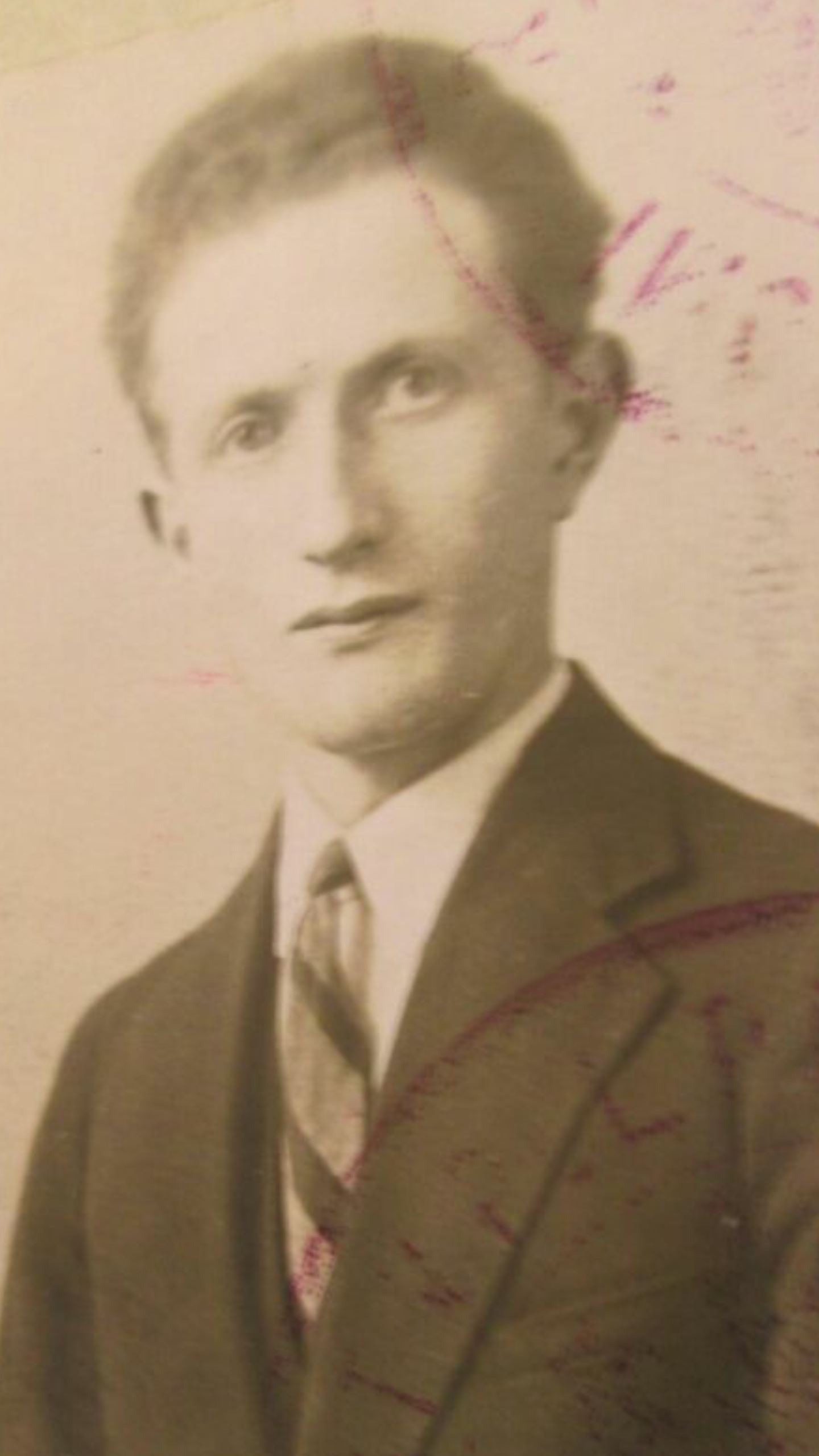
Yisrael Kristal in Poland 1931, aged 28

Kristal was born to a religious Jewish family in Maleniec, Końskie County, near Żarnów, then part of Congress Poland of the Russian Empire, on 15 September 1903. His father was a Torah scholar who ensured his son had a religious education, and Kristal would remain religiously observant all his life. He attended a cheder at age three, where he studied Judaism and Hebrew. He learned the Hebrew Bible at four and the Mishnah at six. In a 2012 interview, he recalled his father waking him at five in the morning to begin his religious instruction.

His mother died in 1913 when he was ten years old. After World War I broke out in 1914, he saw Kaiser Franz Joseph in person when the monarch rode through his town in a car, and recalled sweets being thrown as he passed. His father was drafted into the Imperial Russian Army, was taken prisoner and died soon after the war. Meanwhile, Kristal moved in with his uncles.

In 1920, at age 17, he moved to Łódź. After briefly laboring as a metalworker, he opened a candy store with an uncle. While initially working as a physical laborer, he later became a renowned expert candy-maker. He married Chaja Feige Frucht in 1928, and they had two children.

== Holocaust survival ==
In 1940, after the Germans had taken over Poland during World War II, Kristal continued to manufacture candy, at times secretly and at other times with the encouragement of the heads of the ghetto, among them head of the Łódź Ghetto Judenrat Chaim Rumkowski. His two children died in the ghetto, while Kristal and his wife were deported to Auschwitz concentration camp during the liquidation of the ghetto in August 1944.

Kristal's wife was murdered in Auschwitz; he worked as a forced laborer and survived. When the camp was liberated by the Red Army, Kristal weighed 82 pounds (37 kg). He was taken to the hospital, where he returned to his profession and made candies for Soviet soldiers, before returning to Łódź, where he rebuilt his destroyed candy shop and met his second wife, Batsheva. They married in 1947. The couple had a son, Chaim, who was born in Poland, and a daughter, Shula, who was born in Israel.

== Life in Israel ==
In 1950, the family immigrated to Israel on the ship Komemiyut and settled in Haifa. He initially worked at the Palata candy factory, where he was considered an expert and taught the owners to make an entire production line of sweets. He then became self-employed, making boutique sweets at home and selling them at a Haifa kiosk. Among the sweets he produced were tiny liquor bottles made of chocolate wrapped in colored foil, jam made from carob, and chocolate-covered orange peels. In 1952, he began manufacturing his candies at the Sar and Kristal Factory on Shivat Zion Street. After the factory closed in 1970, he returned to making his candies at home before retiring.

Kristal had nine grandchildren. He also had great-grandchildren, but his family preferred not to state his exact number of descendants for fear of the "evil eye".

Having been unable to do so at the age of 13 due to World War I, Kristal celebrated his bar mitzvah a century later, in September 2016, at the age of 113. Kristal died at his home in Haifa on 11 August 2017, at age 113 years, 10 months.

== Oldest living man ==
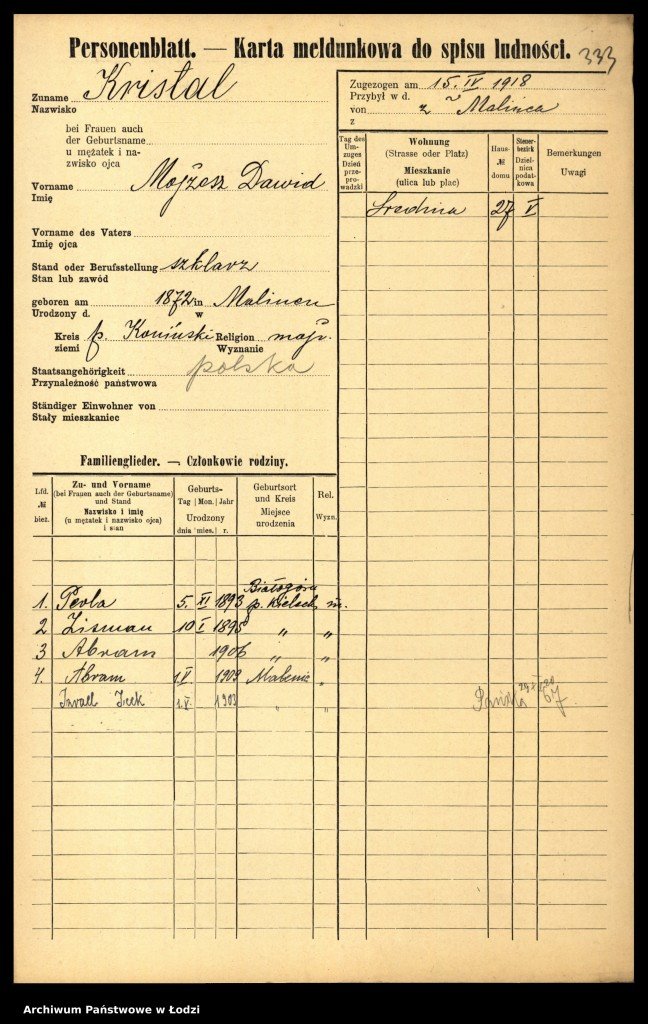
Kristal's name and date of birth on a 1918 record

Following the death of 110-year-old Alice Herz-Sommer in London on 23 February 2014, Kristal became recognized as the world's oldest known Holocaust survivor (though he was actually a few months older than she was). He became the world's oldest living man on 18 January 2016, after the death of Japanese supercentenarian Yasutaro Koide.

On 11 March 2016, Kristal was officially recognized as the world's oldest man by Guinness World Records. His status was verified after documents confirming his age were uncovered in Poland (formerly, the family's oldest document was from his wedding at age 25, but Guinness regulations require documentation from the first 20 years of a person's life to claim the record; the newly found documents were discovered by Jewish Records Indexing – Poland).

== See also ==
- List of the oldest people by country
- List of the verified oldest people
- Yehuda Aharon Vidovsky, another male Polish Jewish (later Israeli Jewish) Holocaust survivor from the Lodz Ghetto who also lived to age 107+
