= Koliszowy =

- Village
- Location within Poland
- Coordinates: 51°10′43″N 20°13′47″E
- Country: Poland
- Voivodeship: Świętokrzyskie
- County: Końskie
- Gmina: Ruda Maleniecka
- Population: 360

Koliszowy [kɔliˈʂɔvɨ] is a village in the administrative district of Gmina Ruda Maleniecka, within Końskie County, Świętokrzyskie Voivodeship, in south-central Poland. It lies approximately 4 km (2 mi) north of Ruda Maleniecka, 14 km (9 mi) west of Końskie, and 43 km (27 mi) north-west of the regional capital Kielce.
