= Maleniec, Końskie County =

Maleniec
- Village
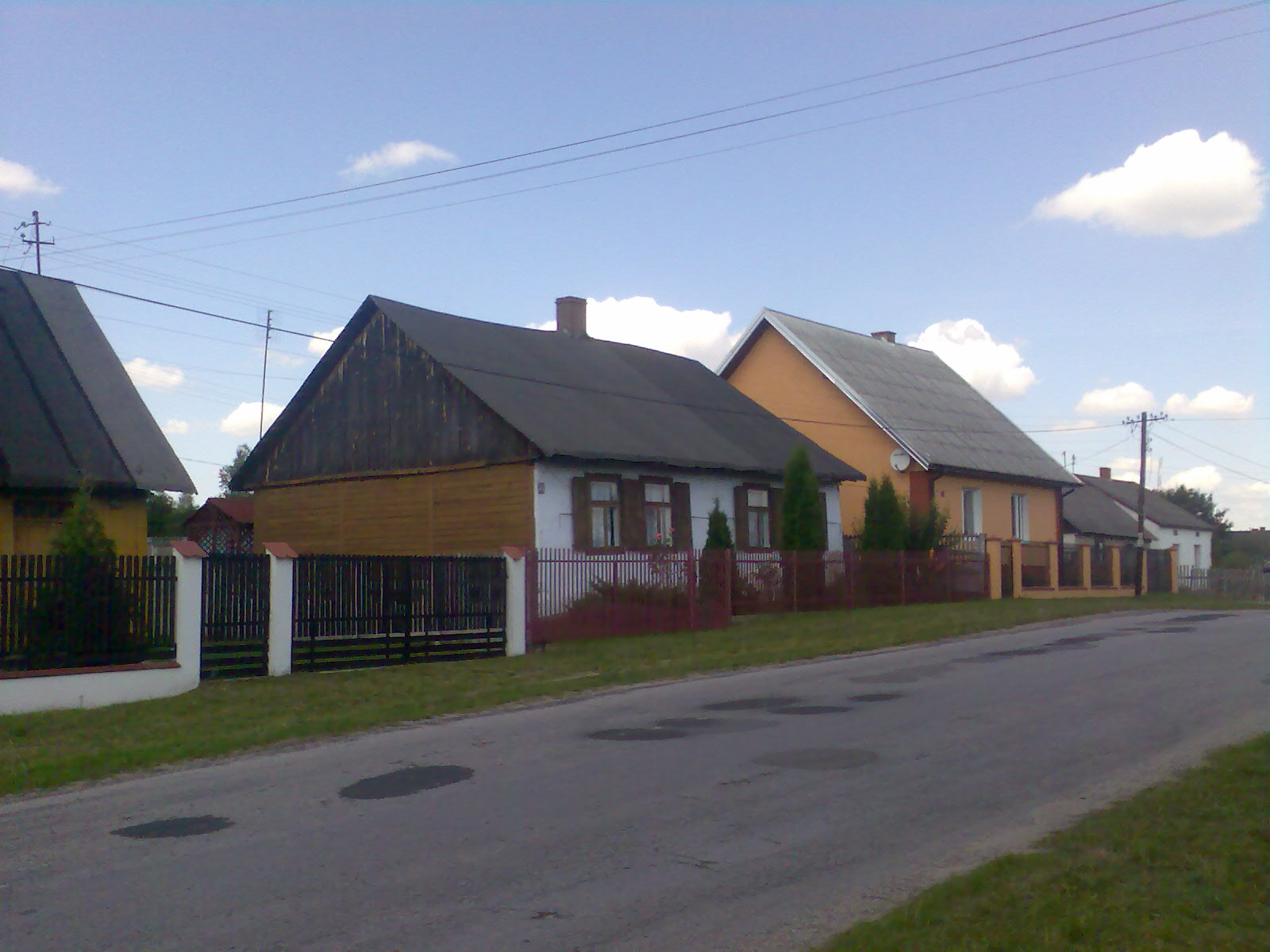

- Location within Poland
- Coordinates: 51°11′14″N 20°11′1″E
- Country: Poland
- Voivodeship: Świętokrzyskie
- County: Końskie
- Gmina: Ruda Maleniecka
- Population: 150

Maleniec [maˈlɛɲɛt͡s] is a village in the administrative district of Gmina Ruda Maleniecka, within Końskie County, Świętokrzyskie Voivodeship, in south-central Poland. It lies approximately 6 km (4 mi) north-west of Ruda Maleniecka, 17 km (11 mi) west of Końskie, and 46 km (29 mi) north-west of the regional capital Kielce.

== Notable people ==
- Yisrael Kristal (1903–2017), Polish-Israeli supercentenarian, former oldest living man in the world and former oldest Holocaust survivor
