= Dęba Kolonia =

- Village
- Location within Poland
- Coordinates: 51°9′54″N 20°14′43″E
- Country: Poland
- Voivodeship: Świętokrzyskie
- County: Końskie
- Gmina: Ruda Maleniecka
- Population: 110

Dęba Kolonia [ˈdɛmba kɔˈlɔɲa] is a village in the administrative district of Gmina Ruda Maleniecka, within Końskie County, Świętokrzyskie Voivodeship, in south-central Poland. It lies approximately 3 km (2 mi) north-east of Ruda Maleniecka, 13 km (8 mi) west of Końskie, and 41 km (25 mi) north-west of the regional capital Kielce.
