= Gmina Ruda Maleniecka =

Gmina Ruda Maleniecka Ruda Maleniecka Commune
- Gmina
- Flag Coat of arms
- Interactive map of Gmina Ruda Maleniecka
- Coordinates (Ruda Maleniecka): 51°8′45″N 20°13′25″E
- Country: Poland
- Voivodeship: Świętokrzyskie
- County: Końskie
- Seat: Ruda Maleniecka

Area
  - Total: 110.03 km^{2} (42.48 sq mi)

Population (2006)
  - Total: 3,364
  - Density: 30.57/km^{2} (79.18/sq mi)
- Website: http://www.rudamaleniecka.pl/

Gmina Ruda Maleniecka (Polish pronunciation: [ˈɾuda malɛˈɲɛt͡ska]) is a rural gmina (administrative district) in Końskie County, Świętokrzyskie Voivodeship, in south-central Poland. Its seat is the village of Ruda Maleniecka, which is located 15 kilometres (9 mi) south-west of Końskie and 41 km (25 mi) north-west of the regional capital Kielce.

The gmina covers an area of 110.03 square kilometres (42.5 sq mi), and as of 2006 its total population is 3,364.

== Villages ==
Gmina Ruda Maleniecka encompasses the villages and settlements of Cieklińsko, Cis, Dęba, Dęba Kolonia, Hucisko, Koliszowy, Kołoniec, Lipa, Machory, Maleniec, Młotkowice, Ruda Maleniecka, Strzęboszów, Szkucin, Tama, Wyszyna Fałkowska, Wyszyna Machorowska and Wyszyna Rudzka.

== Neighbouring gminas ==
Gmina Ruda Maleniecka is bordered by the gminas of Fałków, Końskie, Radoszyce, Słupia and Żarnów.
