= Sacred herb =

Herbs considered sacred in some religions

Sacred herbs are those that are used in the service or worship of a deity in some faiths. Herbs such as myrrh (Commiphora myrrha), ague root (Aletris farinosa), and frankincense (Boswellia spp) in Christianity, Nine Herbs Charm in the partially Christianized Anglo-Saxon pagan, and a form of basil called tulsi—revered as a Hindu goddess for its medicinal value—are utilized in their rites and rituals.

== Europe ==
18th century painting of a druid with mistletoe

Herbs were also considered sacred in European pagan beliefs.

The best known example is the mistletoe. The European mistletoe, Viscum album, figured prominently in Greek mythology, and is believed to be The Golden Bough of Aeneas, ancestor of the Romans. The Norse god Baldr was killed with mistletoe.

Mistletoe bears fruit at the time of the Winter Solstice, the birth of the new year, and may have been used in solstitial rites in Druidic Britain as a symbol of immortality. In Celtic mythology and in druid rituals, it was considered a remedy for barrenness in animals and an antidote to poison, although the fruits of many mistletoes are actually poisonous if ingested as they contain viscotoxins.

Verbena or Vervain has long been associated with divine and other supernatural forces. It was called "tears of Isis" in ancient Egypt, and later on "Juno's tears". In ancient Greece, it was dedicated to Eos Erigineia. In the early Christian era, folk legend stated that Common Vervain (V. officinalis) was used to staunch Jesus' wounds after his removal from the cross. It was consequently called "Holy Herb" or (e.g. in Wales) "Devil's bane". The generic name is the ancient Roman term for sacrificial herbs considered very powerful. Pliny the Elder describes verbena presented on Jupiter altars; It is not entirely clear if this referred to a Verbena rather than the general term for prime sacrificial herbs.

Hazlitt's Faiths and Folklore (1905) quotes Aubrey's Miscellanies (1721), to wit:

"Vervain and Dill / Hinder witches from their will."

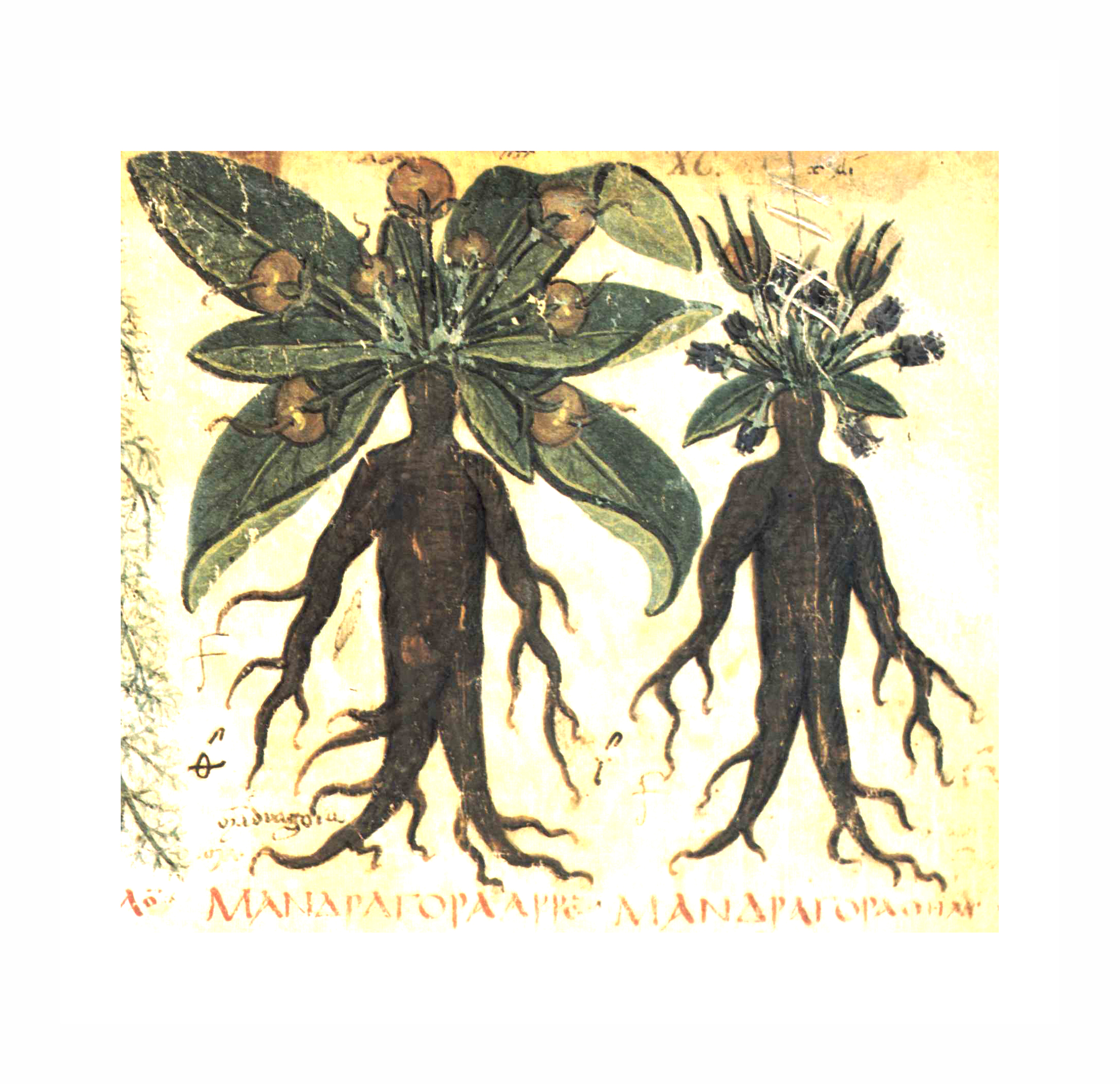
Mandragora roots

Vervain flowers are engraved on cimaruta, Italian anti-stregheria charms. In the 1870 The History and Practice of Magic by "Paul Christian" (Jean-Baptiste Pitois) it is employed in the preparation of a mandragora charm:

Would you like to make a Mandragora, as powerful as the homunculus (little man in a bottle) so praised by Paracelsus? Then find a root of the plant called bryony. Take it out of the ground on a Monday (the day of the moon), a little time after the vernal equinox. Cut off the ends of the root and bury it at night in some country churchyard in a dead man's grave. For thirty days water it with cow's milk in which three bats have been drowned. When the thirty-first day arrives, take out the root in the middle of the night and dry it in an oven heated with branches of verbena; then wrap it up in a piece of a dead man's winding-sheet and carry it with you everywhere.

Other examples of sacred herbs include valerian, yarrow, hemp, and mugwort.

== Americas ==
Sacred non-psychoactive plants widely used in Native American rituals include sweetgrass, and white sage.

== In popular culture ==
In the series of young adult novels The Vampire Diaries, author L. J. Smith uses vervain to protect humans from vampires, in an extension of vervain's fabled magic-suppression powers against witches. In The Struggle, Volume II, the vampire Stefan instructs the human Elena that vervain can "protect you against bewitchment, and it can keep your mind clear if someone is using Powers against you." He tells her how it is prepared and used, "Once I've extracted the oil from the seeds, you can rub it into your skin, or add it to a bath. And you can make the dried leaves into a sachet and carry it with you, or put it under your pillow at night", but gives her an unprepared sprig for protection in the meantime.

== See also ==
- Trees in mythology
- Nine Herbs Charm
