= Cornicello =

Italian amulet or talisman worn to protect against the evil eye

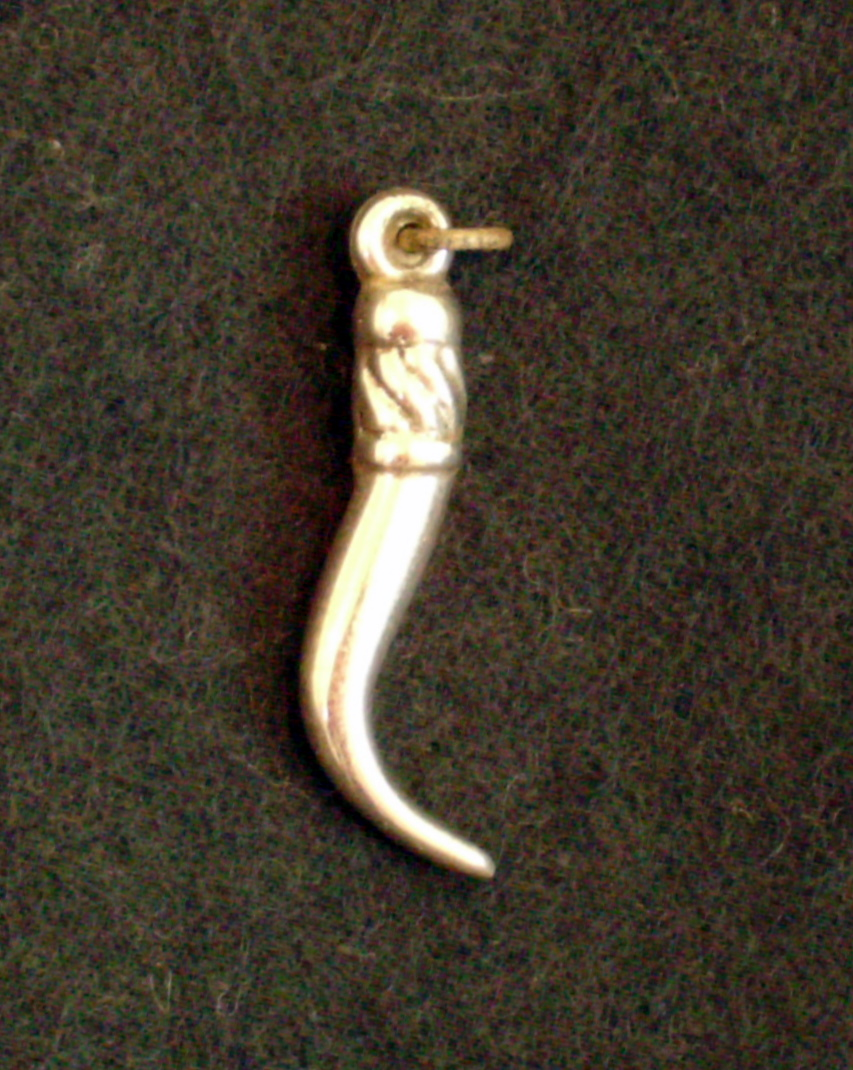
A silver cornicello charm.

A cornicello (Italian pronunciation: [korniˈtʃɛllo]), cornetto (Italian for 'little horn' / 'hornlet'; [korˈnetto]), corno (Italian for 'horn"'), or corno portafortuna (Italian for 'horn that brings luck') is an Italian amulet or talisman worn to protect against the evil eye (or malocchio [maˈlɔkkjo] in Italian) and bad luck in general, and, historically, to promote fertility and virility. In Neapolitan, it is called curniciello or variants thereof. The amulet is also sometimes referred to as the Italian horn.

== Origins and styles ==
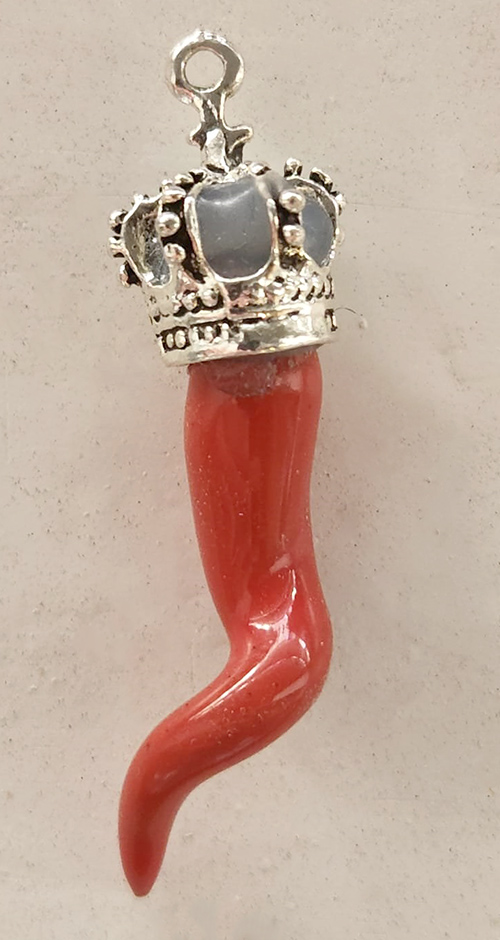
Red cornicello

A cornicello is a twisted horn-shaped charm often made of gold, silver, plastic, bone, terracotta, or red coral. Cornicelli are thought to be modeled after an eland horn, to represent fertility, virility, and strength. The shape and colour of the red cornicelli are reminiscent of a chili pepper. Because chili peppers reached Europe only after the Columbian exchange, this resemblance postdates the amulet, whose horn shape is far older. Dried chili peppers are themselves hung in some Southern Italian homes as a charm against the malocchio. The evil eye is believed to harm nursing mothers and their babies, bearing fruit trees, milking animals, and the sperm of men—‌the forces of generation. In addition to being worn as jewelry, cornicelli are sometimes hung from the rearview mirrors of cars (based on the older custom of using them to protect draft horses), and in houses.

The cornicello is also linked to Greek and Roman mythology. The cornucopia became a symbol of fertility and the earth after Zeus broke a horn from a goat. He filled it with fruit and flowers and gave it to his caretaker. The coral of which it is often made is sacred to Venus, goddess of love, fertility, sex, and prosperity. Silver, of which it is also often made, is sacred to Luna, goddess of the moon. The phallic shape and red color is also a reference to Priapus, a male fertility god.

A regionally popular amulet, they are most often worn by those in Southern Italy, especially in Abruzzo, Apulia, Basilicata, Calabria, Campania, Lazio, Marche, Molise, Sardinia and Sicily, but also in Friuli-Venezia Giulia and Lombardy. It can also be found among descendants of Italian immigrants in other countries.

== Related ==
Possibly related to the corno is the mano cornuta or "horned hand." This is an Italian hand gesture (or an amulet imitative of the gesture) to ward off the evil eye. Mano means "hand" and corno means "horn." This gesture is performed with the hand levelled or pointing down, or at least slightly downward, usually with a swivelling or oscillating motion.
