= Evil eye =

Curse brought by a malevolent glare

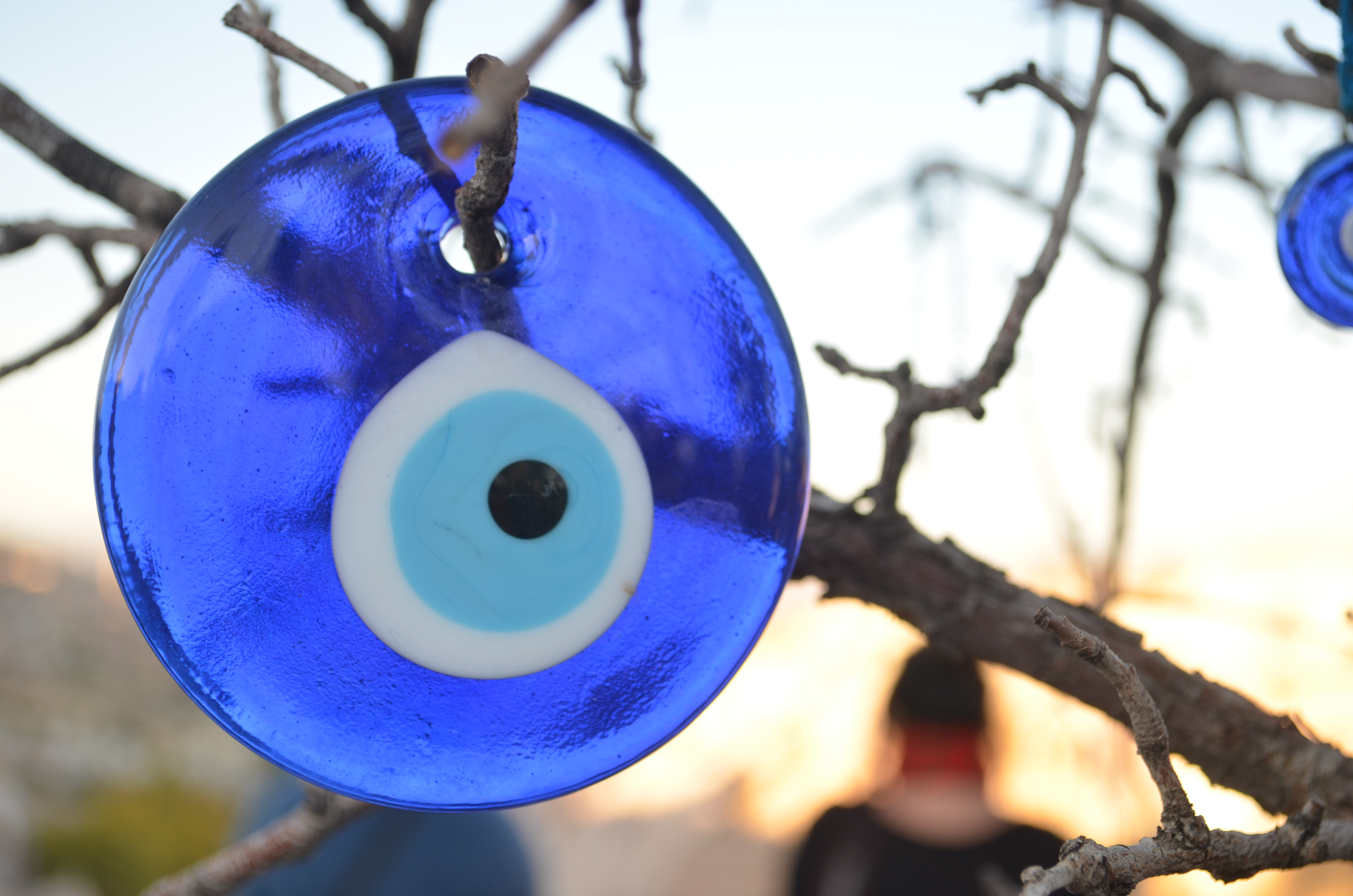
Eye beads are one of many popular amulets and talismans used to ward off the evil eye.

The evil eye is a supernatural belief in a curse brought about by a malevolent glare, usually inspired by envy. Amulets to protect against it have been found dating to around 5,000 years ago. It is found in many cultures in the Mediterranean region, the Balkans, Caucasus, Eastern Europe, West Asia, Central Asia, South Asia, Africa, the Caribbean, and Latin America, with such cultures often believing that receiving the evil eye will cause misfortune or injury, while others believe it to be a kind of supernatural force that casts or reflects a malevolent gaze back upon those who wish harm upon others (especially innocents). The idea also appears multiple times in Jewish rabbinic literature.

Colonia Aurelia Cibalae 3rd century ring with an evil eye talisman. City Museum of Vinkovci, Croatia

Different cultures have pursued measures to protect against the evil eye. Some of the most famous talismans against the evil eye include the nazar amulet, itself a representation of an eye, and the hamsa, a hand-shaped amulet. Older iterations of the symbol were often made of ceramic or clay; however, following the production of glass beads in the Mediterranean region in approximately 1500 BC, evil eye beads were popularised with the Indians, Phoenicians, Persians, Arabs, Greeks, Romans and Ottomans. Illyrians used objects with the shape of phallus, hand, leg, and animal teeth against the evil eye. Ancient Romans used representations of phallus, such as the fascinus, to protect against the evil eye. In modern-day Southern Italy, a variety of amulets and gestures are used for protection, including the cornicello, the cimaruta, and the sign of the horns.

In different cultures, the evil eye can be fought against with yet other methods – in Arab culture, saying the phrase "Masha'Allah" (ما شاء الله) ("God has willed it") alongside a compliment prevents the compliment from attracting the evil eye, whereas in some countries, such as Palestine and Iran, certain specific plants – such as rue – are considered prone to protecting against the evil eye.

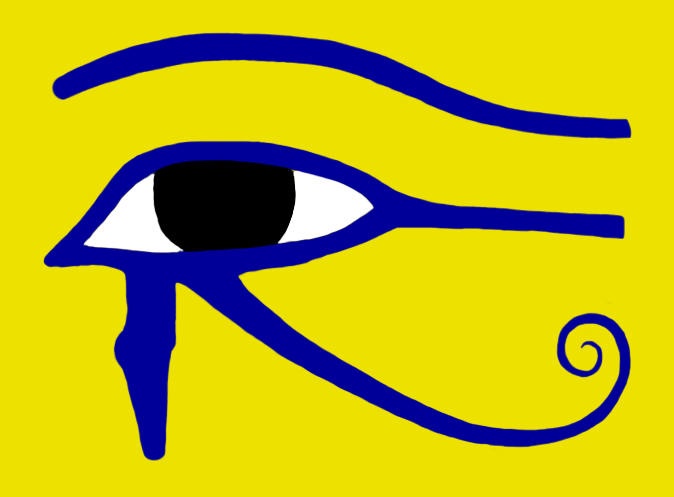
Eye of Horus

== History ==
Early evidence excavated from various ancient cities includes alabaster idols with incised eyes found in Tell Brak, one of Mesopotamia's oldest cities. Texts from ancient Ugarit, a port city in what is now Syria, attest to the concept of the 'evil eye' – the city existed until about 1180 BC, during the late Bronze Age collapse. In Greek Classical antiquity, the 'evil eye' is referenced by Hesiod, Callimachus, Plato, Diodorus Siculus, Theocritus, Plutarch, Heliodorus, Pliny the Elder, and Aulus Gellius. Peter Walcot's Envy and the Greeks (1978) listed more than one hundred works by these and other authors mentioning the evil eye. Ancient Greek authors frequently mentioned the ὀφθαλμὸς βάσκανος (ophthalmòs báskanos; evil eye).

As widely documented in archaeological findings and in ancient literature, the Illyrians believed in the force of spells and the evil eye, in the magic power of protective and beneficial amulets which could avert the evil eye or the bad intentions of enemies. Such amulets included objects with the shape of phallus, hand, leg, and animal teeth.

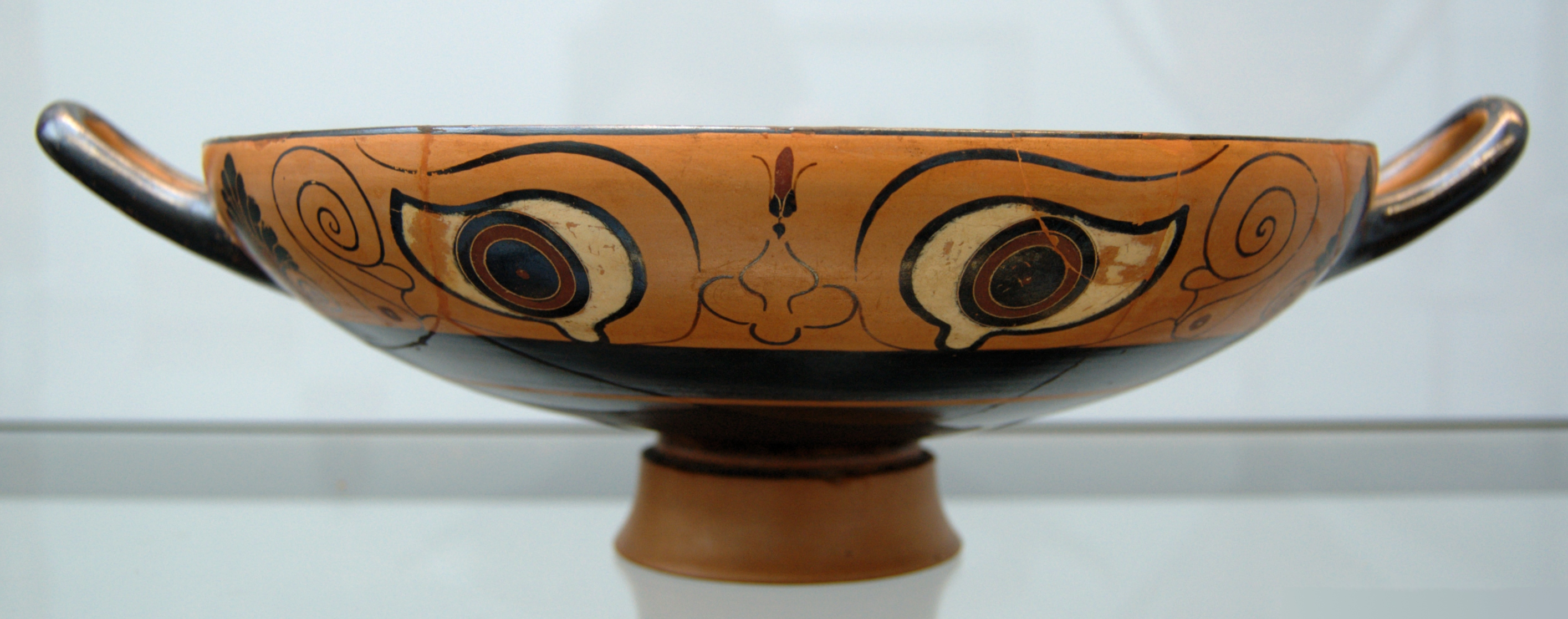
Kylix eye cup (530–520 BC), inscribed with Chalcidian text. It features an eye motif, likely to ward off the evil eye.

Classical authors attempted both to describe and to explain the function of the evil eye. Plutarch in his work entitled Symposium has a separate chapter describing such beliefs. In his scientific explanation, he stated that the eyes were the chief, if not sole, source of the deadly rays that were supposed to spring up like poisoned darts from the inner recesses of a person possessing the evil eye. Plutarch treated the phenomenon of the evil eye as something seemingly inexplicable that is a source of wonder and cause of incredulity. (Note: Plutarch, Moralia, Book VII) Pliny the Elder described the ability of certain African enchanters to have the "power of fascination with the eyes and can even kill those on whom they fix their gaze". (Note: Pliny the Elder, Natural History, VII.2)

The idea of the evil eye appears in the poetry of Virgil in a conversation between the shepherds Menalcas and Damoetas. (Note: Virgil, Eclogues, III.1.103) In the passage, Menalcas is lamenting the poor health of his stock: "What eye is it that has fascinated my tender lambs?".

Ancient Greeks and Romans believed that the evil eye could affect both humans and animals, for example cattle.

=== Protection from the eye ===
Belief in the evil eye during antiquity varied across different regions and periods. The evil eye was not feared with equal intensity in every corner of the Roman Empire. There were places in which people felt more conscious of the danger of the evil eye. In Roman times, not only were individuals considered to possess the power of the evil eye but whole tribes, especially those of Pontus and Scythia, were believed to be transmitters of the evil eye.

Many different objects and charms were used for protection from fascination. The protective items referred to by the Greeks with a variety of names such as apotropaia, probaskania, periammata, periapta, profylaktika and phylaktiria. Greeks placed talismans in their houses and wore amulets to protect them from the evil eye, in addition they attached charms on the animals. Peisistratus hung the figure of a kind of grasshopper before the Acropolis of Athens for protection.

The fascinus or fascinum, from the Latin verb fascinare "to cast a spell" (the origin of the English word "fascinate"), is one example of an apotropaic object used against the evil eye. They have been found throughout Europe and into the Middle East from contexts dating from the first century BC to the fourth century AD. The phallic charms were often objects of personal adornment (such as pendants and finger rings), but also appeared as stone carvings on buildings, mosaics, and wind-chimes (tintinnabula). Examples of stone phallic carvings, such as from Leptis Magna, depict a disembodied phallus attacking an evil eye by ejaculating towards it. In describing their ability to deflect the evil eye, Ralph Merrifield described the Roman phallic charm as a "kind of lightning conductor for good luck".

Another way for protection from fascination used by the ancient Greeks and Romans was by spitting into the folds of the clothes.

Ancient Greeks also had an old custom of dressing boys as girls in order to avert the evil eye.

=== Protective talismans and cures ===
The hamsa, a charm made to ward off the evil eye

Attempts to ward off the curse of the evil eye have resulted in a number of talismans in many cultures. As a class, they are called "apotropaic" (Greek for "prophylactic", "apotraiptic" / προφυλακτικός, αποτρεπτικός or "protective" or "determent", literally: "turns away") talismans, meaning that they turn away or turn back harm.

Disks or balls, consisting of concentric blue and white circles (usually, from inside to outside, dark blue, light blue, white, and dark blue) representing an evil eye are common apotropaic talismans in West Asia and the Balkans, found on the prows of boats and elsewhere; in some forms of the folklore, the staring eyes are supposed to bend the malicious gaze back to the sorcerer.

Known as nazar (Turkish: nazar boncuğu or nazarlık), this talisman is most frequently seen in Turkey, found in or on houses and vehicles or worn as beads.

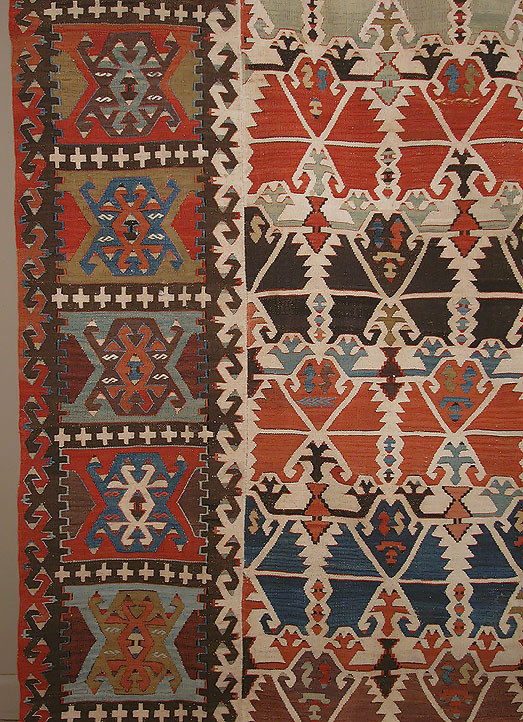
Detail of a 19th-century Anatolian kilim, with rows of crosses (Turkish: Haç) and scattered S-shaped hooks (Turkish: Çengel), both to ward off the evil eye

The word hamsa, also spelled khamsa, means "five" referring to the fingers of the hand. In the Levantine Christian culture is called the Hand of Mary, in some Muslim and Balkan cultures, the Hand of Fatima. It is condemned as superstition by doctrinaire Muslims. To many individuals, though, the hamsa or nazar are simply used as decoration.

A variety of motifs to ward off the evil eye are commonly woven into tribal kilim rugs. Such motifs include a cross (Turkish: Haç) to divide the evil eye into four, a hook (Turkish: Çengel) to destroy the evil eye, or a human eye (Turkish: Göz) to avert the evil gaze. The shape of a lucky amulet (Turkish: Muska; often, a triangular package containing a sacred verse) is often woven into kilims for the same reason.

While the Egyptian Eye of Horus is a similar symbol of protection and good health and luck, the Greek evil eye talisman specifically protects against malevolent gazes. Similarly, the Eye-Idols (c. 8700–3500 BC) excavated at the Tell Brak Eye Temple are believed to have been figurines offered to the gods, and according to the Metropolitan Museum of Art, are unrelated to a belief in the evil eye.

== Around the world ==
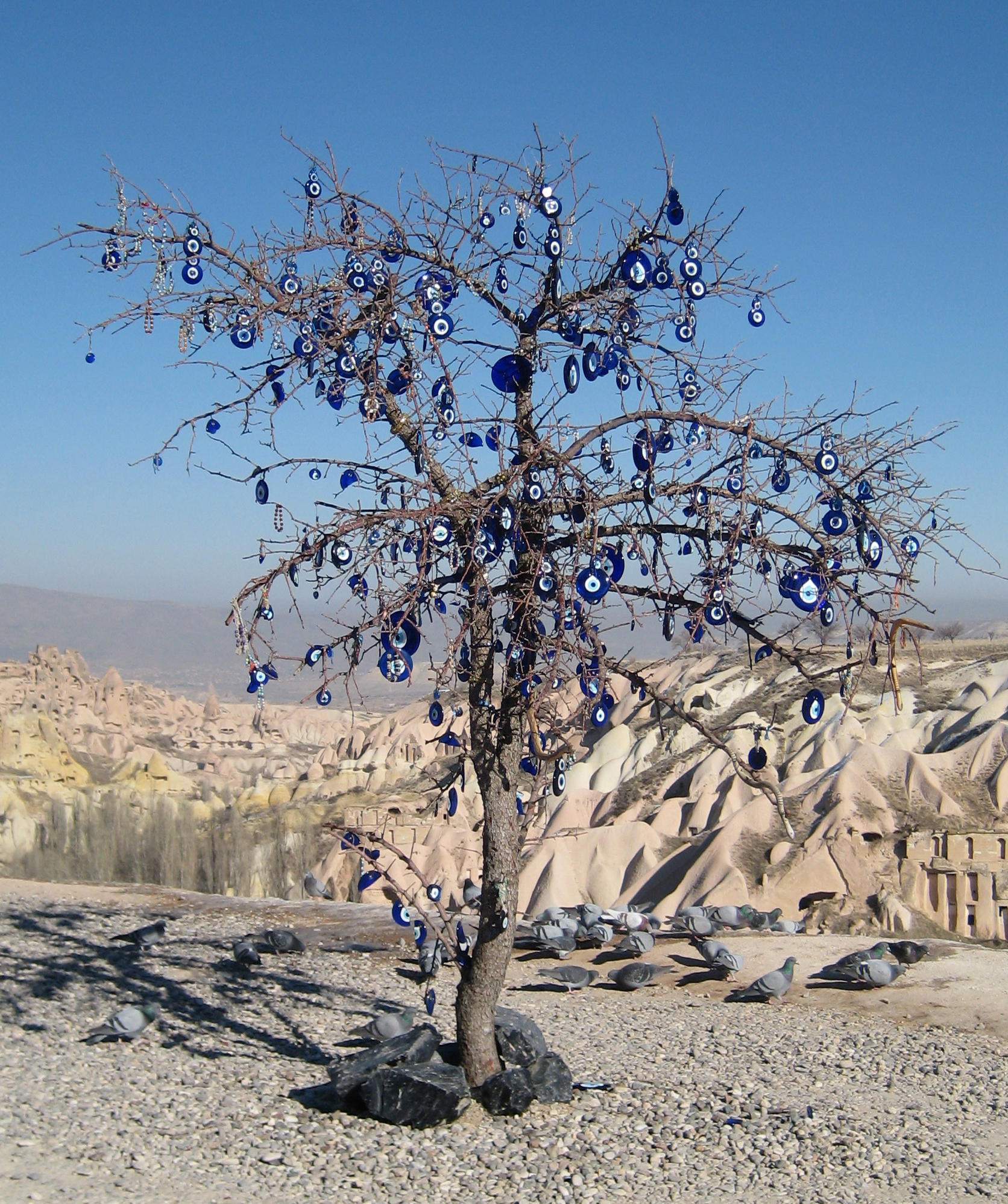
Tree with nazars in Cappadocia, Turkey

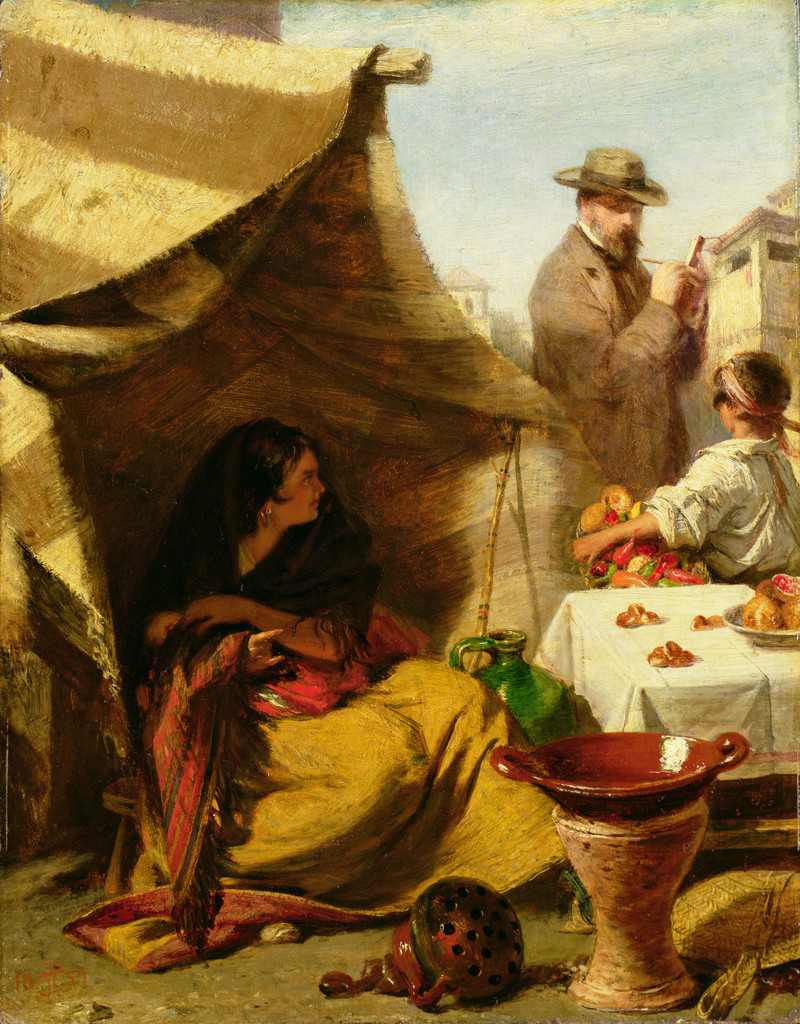
John Phillip, The Evil Eye (1859), a self-portrait depicting the artist sketching a Spanish Romani woman who thinks she is being given the evil eye.

Belief in the evil eye likely originated within Indo-European, Mediterranean, and West Asian cultures. Probably starting in Sumeria, it spread through the Greco-Roman world, India, Portugal, Spain, northern Europe and North Africa. It has, however, not been found in the original folklore traditions of Asia, Sub-Saharan Africa and Native America. Only with the arrival of Spanish colonies in the New World, did the belief spread there in particular.

Belief in the evil eye is found in the Islamic doctrine, based upon the statement of the Islamic prophet Muhammad, "The influence of an evil eye is a fact..." [Sahih Muslim, Book 26, Number 5427]. Authentic practices of warding off the evil eye are also commonly practiced by Muslims: rather than directly expressing appreciation of, for example, a child's beauty, it is customary to say Masha'Allah, that is, "God has willed it", or invoking God's blessings upon the object or person who is being admired. A 2012 Pew Research Survey found belief in the Evil Eye is still very common in many Muslim majority countries, with majorities in 20 out of the 39 countries surveyed.

In the Aegean Region and other areas where light-colored eyes are relatively rare, people with green eyes, and especially blue eyes, are thought to bestow the curse, intentionally or unintentionally. Thus, in Greece and Turkey amulets against the evil eye take the form of eyes looking back at someone. These amulets are known as Greek eyes or Turkish eyes, depending on the region.

A 2015 Pew Research Survey in Central and Eastern Europe found a Median of 48% of adults reported believing in the Evil Eye, with majorities in Greece (66%), Latvia (66%), Ukraine (60%), Armenia (59%), Moldova (57%), Russia (56%), Bulgaria (55%), Georgia (52%), and Lithuania (51%).

In the painting The Evil Eye by Scottish painter John Phillip, we witness the culture clash experienced by a woman who suspects that the artist's gaze implies that he is looking at her with the evil eye.

Among those who do not take the evil eye literally, either by reason of the culture in which they were raised or because they simply do not believe it, the phrase, "to give someone the evil eye" usually means simply to glare at the person in anger or disgust. In such context could also simply be used to express jealousy, envy or admiration, especially in a hyperbolic manner. The term has entered into common usage within the English language. Within the broadcasting industry, it refers to when a presenter signals to the interviewee or co-presenter to stop talking due to a shortage of time.

=== By religion ===
==== In Judaism ====
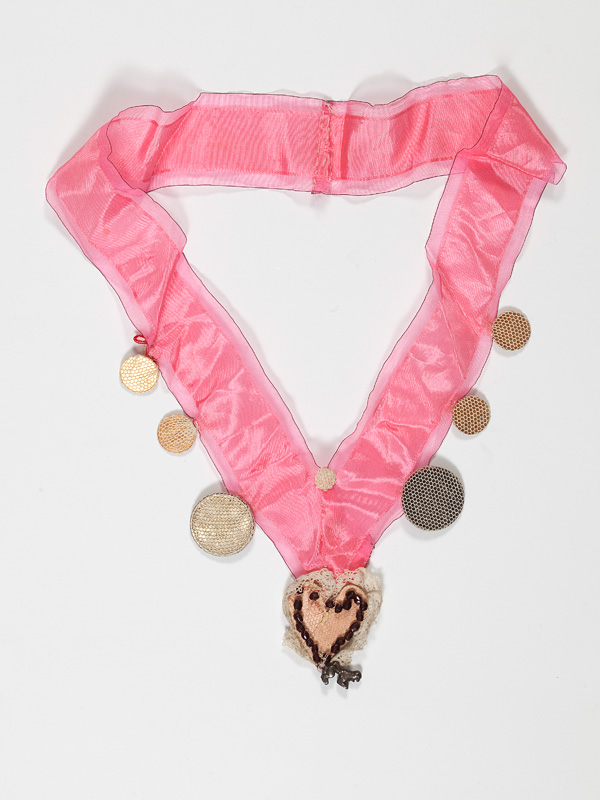
Pink protective neckband with a heart-shaped pendant and coins designed to distract the evil eye, 1944, Basel. In the Jewish Museum of Switzerland's collection.

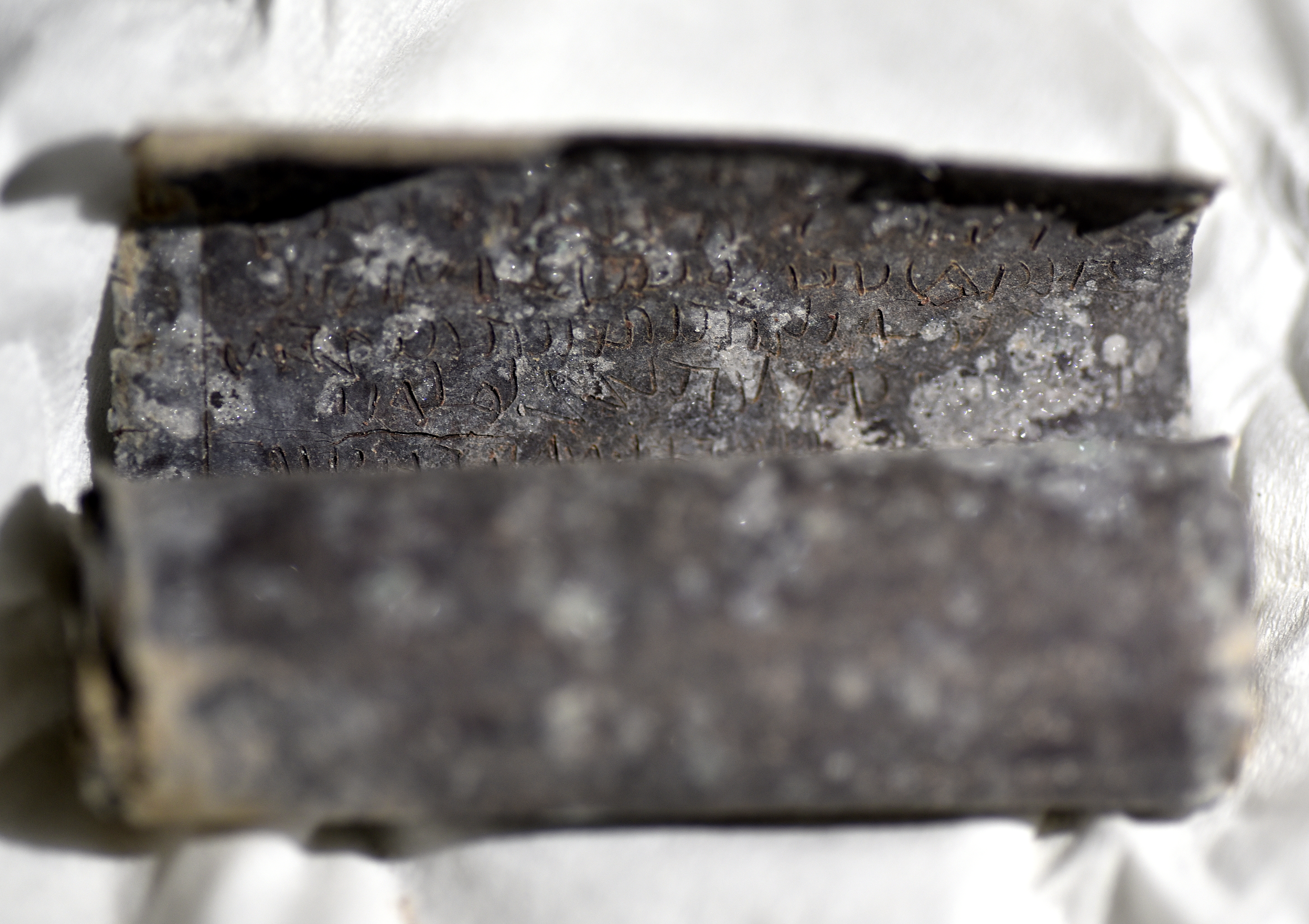
A tiny lead scroll about 200 years old inscribed with a Hebrew text for prayer and warding off evils. The scroll was inserted into some form of silver accessory (Kurdish: لوله و زه نجير, lit. 'bar and chain'), wrapped with a piece of cotton, to be hung on the chest. Kurd's Heritage Museum, Sulaymaniyah, Iraq.

The evil eye is mentioned several times in the classic Pirkei Avot (Ethics of Our Fathers). In Chapter II, five disciples of Rabbi Yochanan ben Zakai give advice on how to follow the good path in life and avoid the bad. Rabbi Eliezer says an evil eye is worse than a bad friend, a bad neighbor, or an evil heart.

Talmudic exegete, Rashi, says in the wake of the words of Israel's Sages that when the ten sons of Jacob went down into Egypt to buy provisions, they made themselves inconspicuous by each entering into a separate gate, so that they would not be gazed upon by the local Egyptians and, thereby, trigger a malevolent response (the Evil eye) by their onlookers, seeing that they were all handsome and of brave and manly dispositions.

Some Jews believe that a "good eye" designates an attitude of goodwill and kindness towards others. Someone who has this attitude in life will rejoice when his fellow man prospers; he will wish everyone well. An "evil eye" denotes the opposite attitude. A man with "an evil eye" will not only feel no joy but experience actual distress when others prosper and will rejoice when others suffer. A person of this character represents a great danger to moral purity, according to some Jews.

Rabbi Abraham Isaac Kook explained that the evil eye is "an example of how one soul may affect another through unseen connections between them. We are all influenced by our environment [...] The evil eye is the venomous impact from malignant feelings of jealousy and envy of those around us."

In Jewish religious law, it is forbidden for a person to stand and gaze at another's field of ripening grain, for fear that his stares will do harm to that field and its produce. Likewise, the rabbis caution a person not to buy a field that borders a city, unless he were to first build a fence around the field, in order to prevent the bad effects of the evil eye of passers-by.

Many observant Jews avoid talking about valuable items they own, good luck that has come to them and, in particular, their children. If any of these are mentioned, the speaker and/or listener will say b'li ayin hara (Hebrew: בלי עין הרע), meaning "without an evil eye", or keyn eyn-hore (Yiddish: קיין עין־הרע; often shortened to kinehore, קינעהאָרע), "no evil eye". Another way to ward off the evil eye is to spit three times (or pretend to). Romans call this custom "despuere malum," to spit at evil.

Rituals surrounding birth and young children are often centred around protection from the evil eye. An example of this is the textile neckbands worn by boys for their brit milah, especially in the regions of Alsace, Southern Germany and Switzerland. The neckbands often had a central coin or colourful coral, designed to draw the evil eye away from the boy and thus protect him during circumcision.

==== In Islam ====
In Islam, the evil eye, or al-ʽayn (Arabic: العين, also عين الحسودة), is a common belief that individuals have the power to cause harm to people, animals or objects, by looking at them in a way that indicates jealousy. Although envy activates the evil eye, this happens (or usually happens) unconsciously, and the person who casts it is not responsible (or usually not responsible) for it.

The evil eye causes its victim to become unwell the next day, unless a protective phrase such as "with the will of God" (mashallah in Arabic) or “May Allah Bless You” (Alhumma Barik) is recited.

Among the rituals to ward off the evil eye are to say "TabarakAllah" (تبارك الله) ("Blessings of God") or "Masha'Allah" (ما شاء الله) ("God has willed it") if a compliment is to be made.

==== In Hinduism ====
Although Śrauta traditions do not have a concept of evil, it has been incorporated as a mainstream practice within modern Hinduism. For example, when a mother observes that her child is being excessively complimented, it is common for the mother to attempt to neutralize the effects of the evil eye (nazar utarna, drushti teeta or drushti tegeyodu). A common example of a neutralizing ritual involves holding red chilies in one hand and circling the child's head a few times, then burning the chilies.

Another Hindu ritual called the oucchay is also employed to heal nazar, though this might also be incorrectly interchangeably called a jharay. Ingredients such as onion skin, salt, cobweb, hot pepper or mustard seeds, piece of a cocoyea broom, a lock of the victim's hair (in the case of children, it is a lock of the mother's hair) are wrapped in a tissue or newspaper. The officiant will circle the wrapped objects around the victim's body before burning them all. It is believed that if the items create a large, crackling flame and a foul stench, it is an indication that the victim had a severe case of nazar. At the end of the ritual, the victim may be asked to walk away without looking back while the objects burn.

=== By geographic region ===
==== Africa ====
===== Ethiopia =====
Belief in the evil eye, also known as buda or bouda, is widespread in Ethiopia. Buda is generally believed to be a power held and wielded by those in a different social group, for example among the metalworkers. Some Ethiopian Christians carry an amulet or talisman, known as a kitab, or will invoke God's name, to ward off the ill effects of buda. A debtera, who is either an unordained priest or educated layperson, will create these protective amulets or talismans.

===== Senegal =====
The equivalent of the evil eye in Wolof would be the "thiat". It is believed that beautiful objects may break if enviously stared at by others. To repel the effect of the evil eye, Senegalese people may wear cowrie shell bracelets. The sea shells are said to absorb the negative energy of the thiat, and gradually darken until the bracelet breaks. It is also common for superstitious people to wear "gris-gris" made by a marabout to avoid misfortune.

==== Asia ====
===== Assyrians =====
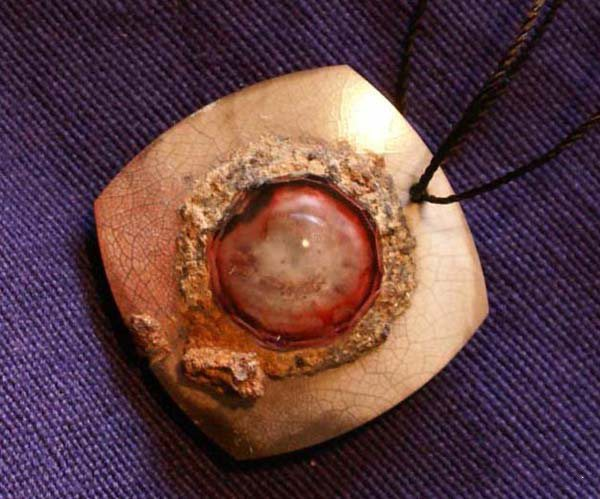
A ruby eye pendant from an ancient civilization in Mesopotamia was possibly used as an amulet to protect against the evil eyes. Adilnor Collection.

The belief of the evil eye is strong in Assyrians. A blue/turquoise bead with two, seven or nine small holes resembling eyes around a necklace is often worn and is said to be protection from the evil eye. Some may also spit three times without saliva. It is said that people with green or blue eyes are more prone to the evil eye effect.

===== India =====
In Andhra Pradesh and Telangana, people call it as disti or drusti, while people of Tamil Nadu call it drishti or kannu (formally kan, meaning "the eye"). The people of Kerala also call it drishti or kannu, the latter of which is Malayalam for "eye". The people of Karnataka call it drushti, similar to other southern Indian languages. To remove drishti, people follow several methods based on their culture/area. Items often used are either rock salt, red chilies, white pumpkins, oiled cloth, or lemons coated with kumkuma. People remove drishti by rotating any one of these items around the affected person. The person who removes it will then burn the item, or discard it in a place where others are not likely to stamp on these items. People hang pictures of fierce and scary ogres called drishti bommai in their homes or vehicles, to ward off the evil eye.

Indians often leave small patches of rock salt outside their homes, and hang arrangements of green chilies, neem leaves, and lemons on their stoop. The belief is that this will ward away the evil eye cast on families by detractors.

===== Pakistan =====
In Pakistan, the evil eye is called Nazar (نظر). People usually may resort to reading the last three chapters of the Quran, namely Sura Ikhlas, Sura Al-Falaq and Sura Al-Nas. The phrase masha'Allah (Arabic: ما شاء الله, meaning "God has willed it") is commonly said to ward off the evil eye. Understanding of the evil eye varies by the level of education. Some perceive the use of black color to be useful in protecting from the evil eye. Others use ta'awiz to ward off the evil eye. Truck owners and other public transport vehicles may commonly be seen using a small black cloth on the bumpers to prevent the evil eye.

===== Turkey =====
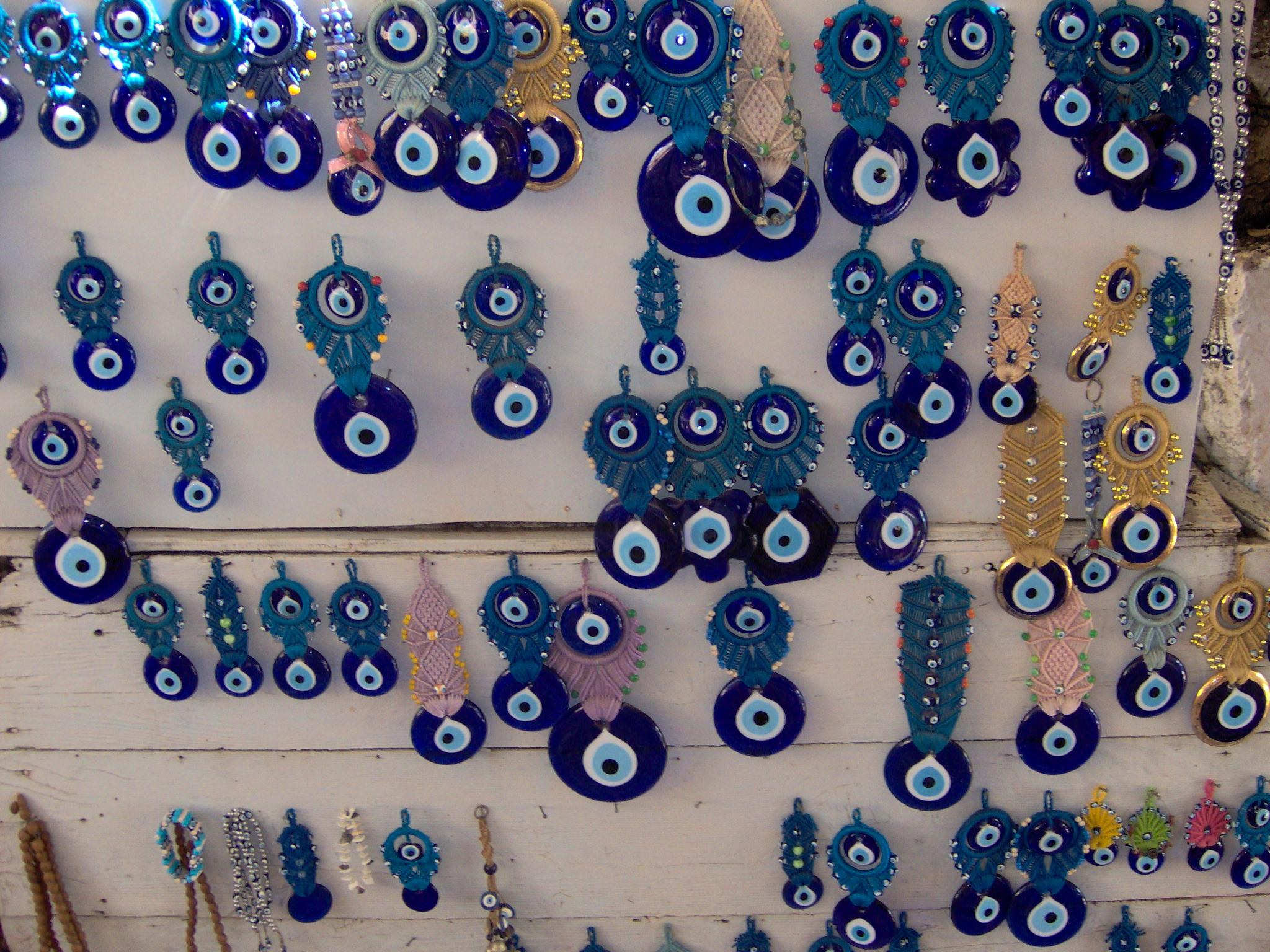
Traditionally shaped nazar ornaments

A typical nazar is made of handmade glass featuring concentric circles or teardrop shapes in dark blue, white, light blue, and black, occasionally with a yellow/gold edge. Each color of the nazar has a specific meaning, symbolizing various aspects of protection and luck.

Cultures that have nazars or some variation include Turkey, Romania, Albania, North Macedonia, Bosnia and Herzegovina, Bulgaria, Greece, Cyprus, Syria, Lebanon, Jordan, Israel, Palestine, Egypt, Armenia, Iran, India, Pakistan, Uzbekistan, Afghanistan, Türkmenistan, Iraq and Azerbaijan, where the nazar is often hung in homes, offices, cars, children's clothing, or incorporated in jewellery and ornaments.

They are a popular choice of souvenir with tourists.

==== Caribbean ====
In Trinidad and Tobago, the evil eye is called bad eye, maljo (from French Creole mal yeux, literally meaning 'bad eye') and najar by the Indo-Trinidadians. The term is used in the infinitive (to maljo) and as a noun (to have/get maljo) referring to persons who have been afflicted. Maljo may be passed on inadvertently, but is believed to be more severe when coming from an envious person or one with bad intentions. It is thought to happen more readily when a person is stared at–especially while eating food. A person who has been taken by the ‘bad eye’ may experience unexplained illness or misfortune. In traditional rural legends, "[t]he general belief is that doctors cannot cure maljo—only people who know prayers can 'cut' the maljo and thus cure the victim".

In non-religious respects, there is a strong cultural association between the evil eye and the color blue. It is believed to ward off maljo when worn as clothing or accessories, so much so that some striking shades are referred to as maljo blue. Blue ornaments may be used to protect a household, and blue bottles from Milk of Magnesia have been hung on trees or placed in the yard surrounding a property.

Jumbie beads are the poisonous seeds of the Rosary Pea tree which are used to make jewelry that also wards off maljo and evil spirits.

Maljo believers are particularly concerned with safeguarding babies and children, who are considered to be most vulnerable to its effects. It may be ‘caused by someone born with a "blight" in the eye when such a person looks admiringly at a child. It can also occur with a pat on the head, or with just a glance. Whether it is intended or not, compliments (...) can cause maljo. It can be caused by a stranger, a member of the child's immediate family, or by another relative.’ It may even be passed on by a parent who is obsessed with their own child. A baby with maljo ‘refuses to eat or drink, cries continually, and "pines away.". It may have an "attack of fever".’

A jharay may focus on a specific point of affliction or pain (head, hair, back, feet and so on). It is not unusual for a jharay ceremony to be carried out on children and babies. People believe that najar can cause death. Two types were reported: the "dragging" kind, where the baby gets smaller and smaller and goes through all of the symptoms mentioned above, before withering and dying; the "twenty-four hour" maljo, said to kill in just twenty-four hours if effective help is not obtained.’

In the Afro-Caribbean Spiritual Baptist and Orisha-Shango traditions, a special piece of jewelry called a 'guard' will be blessed by an elder, who invokes its protection on the wearer. It may be a waist bead, anklet, bracelet, or necklace. For babies, a large safety pin might be used as a guard.

==== Europe ====
===== Albania =====
The evil eye (Albanian: syri i keq) is a folk belief widespread among all Albanians. Objects that are traditionally used by Albanians for prevention, protection, and healing from the evil eye are: fire (zjarri), smoke, ashes and embers, and fire related metallic objects; serpent/snake (symbolism, as well as amulets with snakeskin and snake head); garlic; house carvings and house dolls (dordolec in human shape or kukull in animal shape); amulets or pendants made with thunderstones (kokrra e rrufesë or guri i rejës), wolf teeth, seashells; etc.

In order to contrast or avert the evil eye, several rituals with fire, smoke, ashes and embers are practiced. A typical ritual performed by the oldest woman of the family consists in taking a bunch of dry grass and burning it somewhere near the cloth that is being woven, so that the smoke goes towards it. If the grass crackled during the burning, even the evil eye would explode and not be able to do any harm, granting the good luck of the cloth. Ashes and embers are believed to have protective and healing properties, especially for children. In order to get protection against the evil eye, the face of a child is covered with ashes. When children have been taken by the evil eye, they are washed on the ashes. Other Albanian rituals to avert evil, illness and harm in general are performed with fire (zjarri), seeking assistance from its supernatural power.

Albanians traditionally believed in the supreme powers of thunder-stones, which were believed to be formed during lightning strikes and to be fallen from the sky (qielli). Thunder-stones were preserved in family life as important cult objects. It was believed that bringing them inside the house could bring good fortune, prosperity and progress in people, in livestock and in agriculture, or that rifle bullets would not hit the owners of the thunder-stones. A common practice was to hung a thunder-stone pendant on the body of the cattle or on the pregnant woman for good luck and to contrast the evil eye.

===== Finland =====
In Finland, the evil eye is known as paha silmä. The act of causing harm by means of the evil eye is designated by verbs including: silmätä (Eastern Finland), pahentaa (Western Finland), and äkätä (South Karelia and Ingria). Varying constructions involving the verb katsoa 'to look' have been attested in all of Finland.

===== Greece =====
In modern Greece, the evil eye is known as kako mati (Greek: κακό μάτι) or simply as mati (μάτι), "eye". It is cast away through the process of xematiasma (ξεμάτιασμα), whereby the healer silently recites a secret prayer passed over from an older relative of the opposite sex, usually a grandparent. Such prayers are revealed only under specific circumstances, as according to their customs those who reveal them indiscriminately lose their ability to cast off the evil eye. There are several regional versions of the prayer in question, a common one being: "Holy Virgin, Our Lady, if [insert name of the victim] is suffering of the evil eye, release him/her of it." Evil repeated three times. According to custom, if one is indeed afflicted with the evil eye, both victim and healer then start yawning profusely. The healer then performs the sign of the cross three times, and emits spitting-like sounds in the air three times.

Another "test" used to check if the evil eye was cast is that of the oil: under normal conditions, olive oil floats in water, as it is less dense than water. The test of the oil is performed by placing one drop of olive oil in a glass of water, typically holy water. If the drop floats, the test concludes there is no evil eye involved. If the drop sinks, then it is asserted that the evil eye is cast indeed. Another form of the test is to place two drops of olive oil into a glass of water. If the drops remain separated, the test concludes there is no evil eye, but if they merge, there is. There is also a third form where in a plate full of water the "healer" places three or nine drops of oil. If the oil drops become larger and eventually dissolve in the water there is an evil eye. If the drops remain separated from water in a form of a small circle there is not. The first drops are the most important and the number of drops that dissolve in water indicates the strength of the evil eye. Note that a secret chant is spoken when these tests are conducted. The words of the chant are closed practiced and can only be passed from man to woman, or woman to man.

There is another form of the "test" where the healer prepares a few cloves by piercing each one with a pin. Then she lights a candle and grabs a pinned clove with a pair of scissors. She then uses it to do the sign of the cross over the afflicted whilst the afflicted is asked to think of a person who may have given him the evil eye. Then the healer holds the clove over the flame. If the clove burns silently, there is no evil eye present; however, if the clove explodes or burns noisily, that means the person in the thoughts of the afflicted is the one who has cast the evil eye. As the clove explodes, the evil eye is released from the afflicted. Cloves that burn with some noise are considered to be words (λόγια) someone foul-mouthing you that you ought to be wary of. The burned cloves are extinguished into a glass of water and are later buried in the garden along with the pins as they are considered to be contaminated. Greek people will also ward off the evil eye by saying "I spit so that I won't give you the evil eye" (φτου να μη σε ματιάξω!). Contrary to popular belief, the evil eye is not necessarily given by someone wishing you ill, but it stems from admiration - if one considers admiration to be a compelled emotion of astonishment at a rival's success over one's evil plan. Since it is technically possible to give yourself the evil eye, it is advised to be humble.

The Greek church fathers treated envy as a serious spiritual malady, but rejected the ability of an evil eye to harm others remotely. John Chrysostom, in his commentary on Galatians 3:1, explicitly rejects the idea that the eye has any natural power to injure, interpreting the "evil eye" chiefly as jealousy or envy, though in the same passage he also associates such malice with demonic activity. Basil of Caesarea's homily Concerning Envy likewise describes envy primarily as a passion that harms the envious person rather than its target. Nevertheless, prayers against vaskania appear in Greek Euchologia and Books of Needs; modern official guidance in the Greek Orthodox Archdiocese of America acknowledges such prayers, but considers them an aspect of exorcism against specifically demonic attacks and injuries, which can only be administered by a priest, and not through rites and rituals.

===== Italy =====
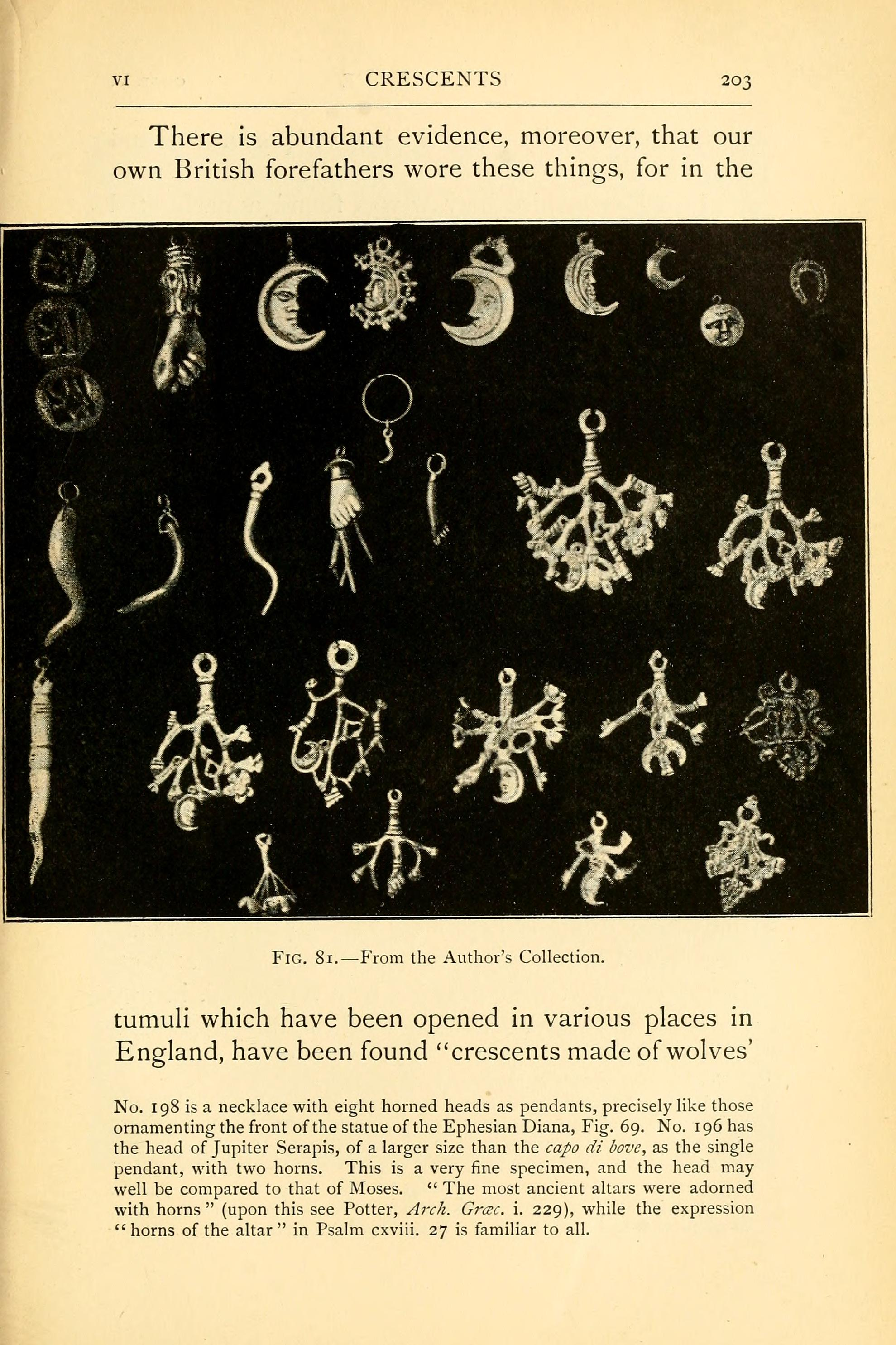
Various evil eye amulets from Italy such as the cornicello, cimaruta, and lunula (1895)

The cornicello ("little horn"), also called the cornetto ("little horn", plural cornetti), is a long, gently twisted horn-shaped amulet. Cornicelli are usually carved out of red coral or made from gold or silver. The type of horn they are intended to copy is not a curled-over sheep horn or goat horn but rather like the twisted horn of an African eland or a chili pepper. A tooth or tuft of fur of the Italian wolf was worn as a talisman against the evil eye.

One idea that the ribald suggestions made by sexual symbols distract the witch from the mental effort needed to successfully bestow the curse. Another is that since the effect of the eye was to dry up liquids, the drying of the phallus (resulting in male impotence) would be averted by seeking refuge in the moist female genitals. Among the ancient Romans and their cultural descendants in the Mediterranean nations, those who were not fortified with phallic charms had to make use of sexual gestures to avoid the eye. Such gestures include scratching one's testicles (for men), as well as the mano cornuta gesture and the fig sign; a fist with the thumb pressed between the index and middle fingers, representing the phallus within the vagina. In addition to the phallic talismans, statues of hands in these gestures, or covered with magical symbols, were carried by the Romans as talismans.

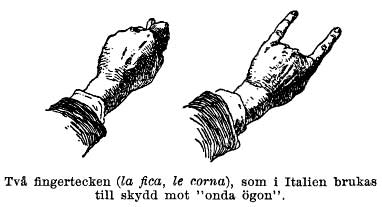
Two handsigns (fig sign and horned sign) used in Italy against the evil eye (1914)

The wielder of the evil eye, called the jettatore, is described as having a striking facial appearance, high arching brows with a stark stare that leaps from his eyes. He often has a reputation for clandestine involvement with dark powers and is the object of gossip about dealings in magic and other forbidden practices. Successful men having tremendous personal magnetism quickly gain notoriety as jettatori. Pope Pius IX was dreaded for his evil eye, and a whole cycle of stories about the disasters that happened in his wake were current in Rome during the latter decades of the 19th century. Public figures of every type, from poets to gangsters, have had their specialized abilities attributed to the power of their eyes.

===== Malta =====
The symbol of the eye, known as l-għajn, is common on traditional fishing boats which are known as luzzu. They are said to protect fishermen from storms and malicious intentions.

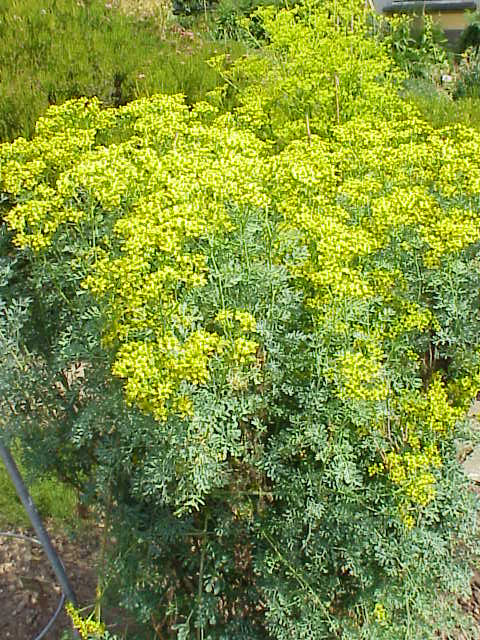
In Brazil, a number of plants are traditionally said to protect against the evil eye, most notably the rue (the Ruta family – arruda in Portuguese).

==== Spain and Latin America ====
The evil eye (Spanish: mal de ojo) has been deeply embedded in Spanish popular culture throughout its history and Spain is the origin of this superstition in Latin America.

In Mexico and Central America, infants are considered at special risk for the evil eye and are often given an amulet bracelet as protection, typically with an eye-like spot painted on the amulet. Another preventive measure is allowing admirers to touch the infant or child; in a similar manner, a person wearing an item of clothing that might induce envy may suggest to others that they touch it or some other way dispel envy.

One traditional cure in Latin America involves a curandero (folk healer) sweeping a raw chicken egg over the body of a victim to absorb the power of the person with the evil eye. The egg is later broken into a glass with water and placed under the bed of the patient near the head. Sometimes it is checked immediately because the egg appears as if it has been cooked. When this happens it means that the patient did have an evil eye. Somehow the evil eye has transferred to the egg and the patient immediately gets well. Fever, pain and diarrhea, nausea/vomiting goes away instantly. In the traditional Hispanic culture of the Southwestern United States and some parts of Latin America, the egg may be passed over the patient in a cross-shaped pattern all over the body, while reciting The Lord's Prayer. The egg is also placed in a glass with water, under the bed and near the head, sometimes it is examined right away or in the morning and if the egg looks like it has been cooked then it means that they did have an evil eye and the patient will start feeling better. Sometimes if the patient starts getting ill and someone knows that they had stared at the patient, usually a child, if the person who stared goes to the child and touches them, the child's illness goes away immediately so the evil eye energy is released.

In some parts of South America the act of ojear ('to give someone the evil eye') is an involuntary act. Someone may ojear babies, animals and inanimate objects just by staring and admiring them. This may produce illness, discomfort or possibly death on babies or animals and failures on inanimate objects like cars or houses. It is a common belief that since this is an involuntary act made by people with the heavy look, the proper way of protection is by attaching a red ribbon to the animal, baby or object, in order to attract the gaze to the ribbon rather than to the object intended to be protected.

===== Mexico =====
Evidence from the colonial period in Mexico is lackluster, causing contrary details of origins and roots. For example, historian Alfredo López Austin notes that it appears nonviable to determine if there are Indigenous or Spanish influences to mal de ojo. The Spanish, possibly out of unfamiliarity with Nahua beliefs or a dismissive attitude toward them, misunderstood and misrepresented Indigenous rituals related to witchcraft. Of all these practices, the only one that bears a faint resemblance to the European idea of the evil eye is the notion of envy and the damage it can cause. Differently from other cultures, in Mexico it is believed that the mal de ojo ("evil eye"; literally, "evil of the eye" or "illness of the eye") can be caused by someone's glance even without any jealousy, envy or evil intention on said person's part. The idea of mal de ojo is therefore connected to other traditional beliefs in the country regarding a supposed underlying sense of insecurity and relative vulnerability to powerful, hostile forces in the environment.

In a study of medical attitudes in the Santa Clara Valley of California, which has many Mexican-descent inhabitants, Margaret Clark arrives at essentially the same conclusion: "Among the Spanish-speaking folk of Sal si Puedes, the patient is regarded as a passive and innocent victim of malevolent forces in his environment. These forces may be witches, evil spirits, the consequences of poverty, or virulent bacteria that invade his body. The scapegoat may be a visiting social worker who unwittingly 'cast the evil eye' ... Mexican folk concepts of disease are based in part on the notion that people can be victimized by the careless or malicious behavior of others".

Another aspect of the mal de ojo syndrome in Ixtepeji is a disturbance of the hot-cold equilibrium in the victim. According to folk belief, the bad effects of an attack result from the "hot" force of the aggressor entering the child's body and throwing it out of balance. Currier has shown how the Mexican hot-cold system is an unconscious folk model of social relations upon which social anxieties are projected. According to Currier, "the nature of Mexican peasant society is such that each individual must continuously attempt to achieve a balance between two opposing social forces: the tendency toward intimacy and that toward withdrawal. [It is therefore proposed] that the individual's continuous preoccupation with achieving a balance between 'heat' and 'cold' is a way of reenacting, in symbolic terms, a fundamental activity in social relations."

As stated by ethnologist and historian Noemí Quezada, adolescents are prioritized when treating mal de ojo. In records from the Mexican and Spanish Inquisitions, it is noted that healers, or curanderos, often focused their treatments on children, as their fragile and still-developing bodies were seen as particularly vulnerable to this affliction.

===== Puerto Rico =====
In Puerto Rico, mal de ojo is believed to be caused when someone gives a wicked glare of jealousy to someone, usually when the person receiving the glare is unaware. The jealousy can be disguised into a positive aspect such as compliments or admiration. mal de ojo is considered a curse and illness. It is believed that without proper protection, bad luck, injury, and illness are expected to follow. Mal de ojo impact is believed to affect speech, relationships, work, family and most notably, health. Since mal de ojo centers around envy and compliments, it creates fear of interacting with people that are outside of their culture. Indirect harm could be brought to them or their family. Environmental symptoms can include financial, family, and personal problems as simple as a car breaking down. It is important for those who believe to be aware of anything that has gone wrong because it may be linked to mal de ojo.

When it comes to children, they are considered to be more susceptible to mal de ojo and it is believed that it can weaken them, leading to illness. As a child grows every effort is taken to protect them. When diagnosing mal de ojo, it is important to notice the symptoms. Physical symptoms can include: loss of appetite, body weakness, stomach ache, insomnia, fever, nausea, eye infections, lack of energy, and temperament. Methods to indicate whether a child has been affected by mal de ojo in Puerto Rico include the use of oil dripped into warm water. A positive sign that the child has fallen victim to mal de ojo includes the oil dissolving.

While mal de ojo is associated with physical symptoms that are often treated with traditional remedies, there is limited scientific evidence supporting the effectiveness of these treatments from a biomedical perspective. However, the use of ethnomedicine—such as addressing symptoms like phlegm in children with asthma—may offer both cultural relevance and perceived physical relief.

Puerto Ricans are protected through the use of Azabache bracelets. Mal de ojo can also be avoided by touching an infant when giving admiration. The most common practice of protection in Puerto Rico is the use of Azabache bracelets. These bracelets traditionally have a black or red coral amulet attached. The amulet is in the shape of a fist with a protruding index finger knuckle.

Eggs are the most common method to cure mal de ojo. The red string and oils also used are more common in other cultures but still used in Puerto Rico depending on the Healer, or the person who is believed to have the ability to cure those who have been targeted. Ultimately, the act of giving someone the "Evil Eye" is a rather simple process and is practiced throughout the world.

===== Brazil =====
Brazilian people generally associate mau-olhado ("act of giving a bad look") or olho gordo (lit. 'fat eye', i.e. "gluttonous eye") with envy or jealousy on domestic and garden plants (that, after months or years of health and beauty, will suddenly weaken, wither and die, with no apparent signs of pest, after the visitation of a certain friend or relative), attractive hair and less often economic or romantic success and family harmony.

Unlike in most cultures mau-olhado is not seen to be something that risks young babies. "Pagans" or non-baptized children are instead assumed to be at risk from bruxas (witches), that have malignant intention themselves rather than just mau-olhado. It probably reflects the Galician folktales about the meigas (witches), as Colonial Brazil was primarily settled by Portuguese people, in numbers greater than all Europeans to settle pre-independence United States. These witches are interpreted to have taken the form of moths, often very dark, that disturb children at night and take away their energy. For that reason, Christian Brazilians often have amulets in the form of crucifixes around, beside or inside beds where children sleep.

Nevertheless, older children, especially boys, who rather fulfill the cultural ideals of good behavior quite well (for example, having no problems whatsoever in eating well a great variety of foods, being obedient and respectful toward adults, kind, polite, studious, and demonstrating no bad blood with other children or their siblings) but yet unexpectedly turn into problematic adolescents or adults (for example lacking good health habits, extreme laziness or lacking motivation towards their life goals, having eating disorders, or being prone to delinquency), are said to have been victims of mau-olhado coming from parents of children whose behavior was not as admirable.

Amulets that protect against mau-olhado tend to be generally resistant, mildly to strongly toxic and dark plants in specific and strategic places of a garden or the entry to a house. Those include: the common rue, chili peppers, Dieffenbachia seguine, Sansevieria trifasciata, and Petiveria alliacea. For those lacking in space or wanting to "sanitize" specific places, they may all be planted together in a single sete ervas ("seven [lucky] herbs") pot, that will also include basil and rosemary. It is, however, said that, when used in a home or any other place for protecting against the evil eye, these plants should not also be used for their culinary purposes.

Other popular amulets used in Brazilian folk traditions against evil eye include: the use of mirrors, on the outside of your home's front door, or also inside your home facing your front door; an elephant figurine with its back to the front door; and coarse salt, placed in specific places at home.

==== United States ====
In 1946, the American occultist Henri Gamache published a text called Terrors of the Evil Eye Exposed! (later reprinted as Protection against Evil), which offers directions to defend oneself against the evil eye.

== See also ==
=== Amulets and other protections ===
- Eyespot (mimicry) – as found in living organisms
- Fatima's hand – a palm-shaped amulet popular throughout North Africa and in the Middle East and commonly used in jewellery and wall hangings. Depicting the open right hand, an image recognized and used as a sign of protection in many times throughout history, Fatima's hand (a.k.a. Hamsa) has been traditionally believed to provide defence against the evil eye.
- Harmal – plant used as protection against the evil eye
- Mirror armour – believed to protect not only from cold steel and arrows, but also from the evil eye
- Red string (Kabbalah) – a bracelet in Judaism worn to ward off the evil eye
- Jumbie beads – poisonous seeds of the Rosary Pea tree which are used to make jewelry that wards off maljo (bad eye) and evil spirits in Trinbagonian tradition
- The color blue – in Trinidad and Tobago is believed to ward off the evil eye, particularly when worn as garments or accessories, as well as in indigo dye

=== Creatures ===
- Balor – a character in Irish legend
- Basilisk – a legendary reptile said to cause death to those who look into its eyes
- Beholder (Dungeons & Dragons) – modern invention; uses its large central eye to cast powerful spells
- Cockatrice – a mythical beast said to be able to kill people by looking at them
- Medusa and Gorgon – petrification glance, picture also used as protection from the evil eye
- Petrifaction in mythology and fiction

=== Concepts ===
- Eye of Providence – a symbol showing an eye surrounded by rays of light or a glory, and usually enclosed by a triangle
- Lashon hara – Jewish concept of the "evil tongue"
- Matthew 6:23 "If thine eye be evil" – the evil eye as ungenerosity of spirit, hence darkness/blindness/evil itself
- Rule of Three
- Scopophobia – fear of being stared at
- Tall poppy syndrome – aversion to the success of one's peers
- Usog – a Filipino version
