= Drishti bommai =

South Indian talisman

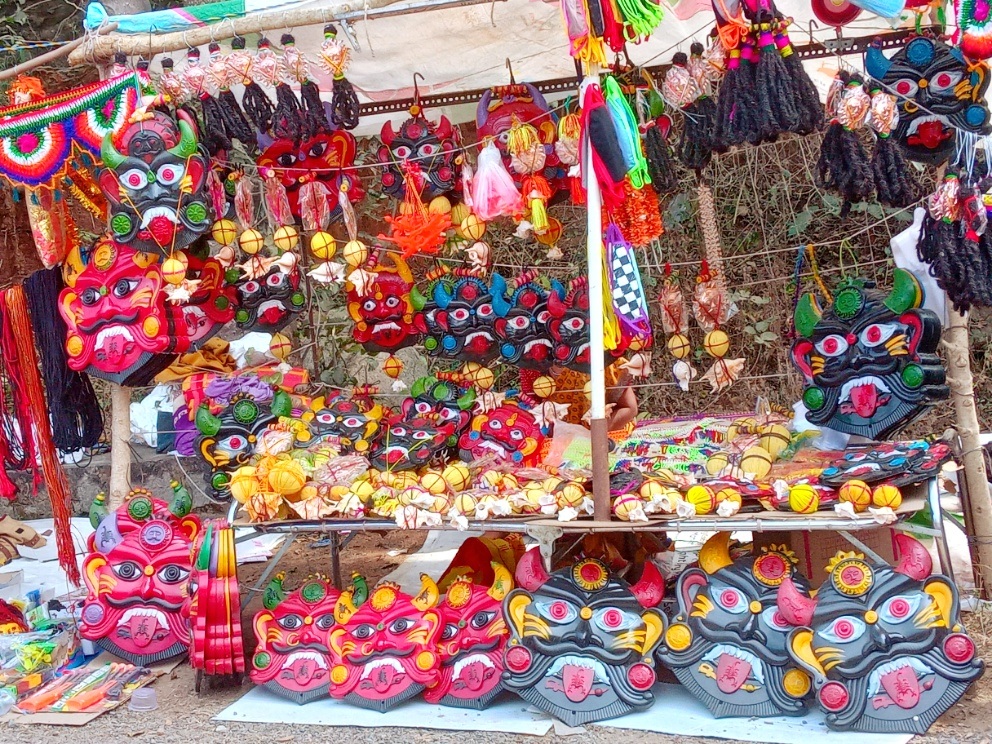
A stall selling drishti bommai.

A drishti bommai (Tamil), drishti gombe (Kannada) or drishti bomma (Telugu) is a talisman represented as a doll, predominantly found in South India. Regarded to possess apotropaic properties, these dolls are prominently hung at construction sites, houses, residential buildings, and trucks, intended to ward off evil. They are regarded to be benevolent asuras, featured as intimidating in appearance to frighten malicious forces. Similar to the Gorgoneion heads of ancient Greece, the decorative wide-eyed, often red, yellow, or green moustached masks and can be seen in the Indian states of Tamil Nadu, Karnataka, Telangana, and Andhra Pradesh, and the union territory of Puducherry.

== Semiotic significance ==
Drishti Bommai refers to a traditional practice in southern India, where a fearsome-looking doll or another object is used as a protective measure against the evil eye. This practice is deeply rooted in local beliefs and superstitions concerning the evil eye, which is thought to bring harm, misfortune, or destruction through a malevolent gaze.

=== Concept of the evil eye ===
The evil eye stems from the belief that thoughts, particularly negative ones like jealousy or envy, can be transmitted telepathically through a person's gaze, specifically from the area between the brows. This belief holds that a person’s intent, whether good or bad, can be transmitted through a glance, and thus, the evil eye can diminish one’s success, possessions, or well-being.

To counteract this, many in southern India use a "drishti absorbent" – an object or image placed prominently in their environment to absorb or deflect the negative energy associated with the evil eye. The belief is that these objects, due to their distinct characteristics, will be the first thing an onlooker notices, thereby protecting the person or space from harm.

=== Semiotic elements of Drishti Bommai ===
- Iconography: The Drishti Bommai often features exaggerated facial features such as bulging eyes, sharp fangs, and a fierce expression. These characteristics are reminiscent of demonic figures from Hindu mythology, like Kali or Bhairava, who are viewed as protectors. The alignment with such divine figures enhances the doll's perceived effectiveness in warding off evil.
- Color symbolism: Bold colors like deep red, black, and bright white are commonly used in the Drishti Bommai. In Indian culture, red symbolizes protection and power, black is believed to absorb or block negative energies, and white often represents purity or divinity.
- Material and placement: Traditionally, Drishti Bommai are made from durable materials like clay, wood, or metal. They are placed in locations such as rooftops, entrances of homes, vehicles, or fields. The semiotic principle of metonymy is at play here, where the protection offered by the doll is believed to extend to the entire space it guards.
- Exaggeration as symbolism: The grotesque features of the Drishti Bommai serve not just to shock but to symbolically amplify its repelling power. For instance, the oversized eyes of the doll symbolize vigilance and the power to confront the evil eye directly.

=== Different forms of Drishti ===
In addition to the Drishti Bommai, several other practices are used to ward off the evil eye:

1. Lemon and Chili Garland: A garland made of lemons and green chilies is hung at the entrance of homes, shops, or on vehicles. The sharpness of the chilies and the sourness of the lemon are believed to repel negative energies.
2. Burning of Camphor: Camphor is burned as part of a ritual, often accompanied by prayers. The smoke is believed to cleanse the area of negative energies.
3. Salt and Mustard Seeds: A mixture of rock salt and mustard seeds is rotated around a person or object and then discarded, absorbing and removing negative energies.
4. Rolling of Coconut: A coconut is rotated around a person or object while prayers are recited, and then smashed to remove drishti.
5. Burning Red Chilies and Camphor: Red chilies are burned with camphor to ward off the evil eye and cleanse the space.
6. Applying Kaal Tikli (Black Dot): A small black dot is applied to a person's forehead, cheek, or behind the ear, believed to distract the evil eye.
7. Alangaram (Garlands and Clothes): Special garlands or new clothes are offered to deities to transfer and neutralize drishti.
8. Use of Ghee Lamps: A ghee lamp is lit and rotated around a person or space while prayers are recited, believed to cleanse and remove negative influences.
9. Hanging of Drishti Bommai: The Drishti Bommai is placed on rooftops or at entrances to scare away negative energies.
10. Burning Turmeric: Turmeric is burned or sprinkled to purify and remove drishti.
11. Use of Kumkum (Vermilion): A red mark made from kumkum is placed on the forehead or at the entrance of homes to attract positive energy.
12. Rice and Pepper Ritual: A mixture of rice and black pepper is rotated around a person and then thrown outside, believed to remove negative energies.
13. Puja and Mantra Chanting: Special worship rituals and mantras are conducted to invoke divine protection and purify spaces from negative influences.
14. Drawing Kolam or Rangoli: Elaborate patterns are drawn at the entrance of homes to welcome positive energies and ward off the evil eye.
