= Cimaruta =

Italian folk charm

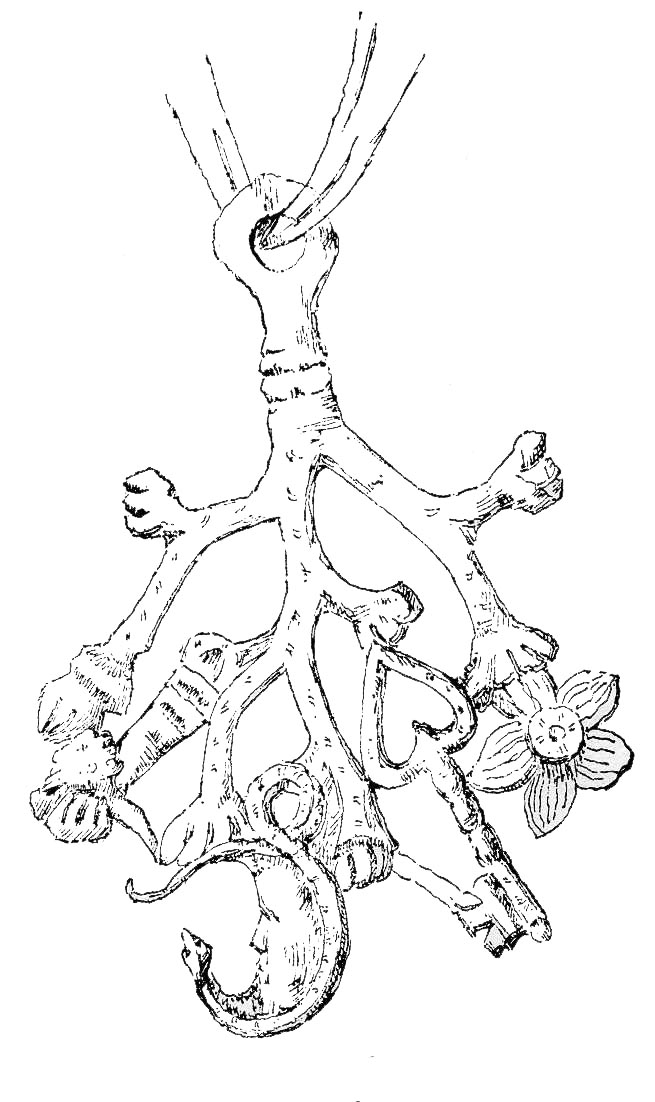
Engraving of a cimaruta (1895)

The cimaruta ("chee-mah-roo-tah"; plural cimarute) is an Italian folk amulet or talisman, traditionally worn around the neck or hung above an infant's bed to ward off the evil eye (Italian: mal'occhio). Commonly made of silver, the amulet itself consists of several small apotropaic charms (some of which draw upon Christian symbolism), with each individual piece attached to what is supposed to represent a branch of rue—the flowering medicinal herb for which the whole talisman is named, "cimaruta" being a Neapolitan form of cima di ruta: Italian for "sprig of rue".

The component parts of the cimarute, which are particularly associated with Southern Italy, may differ by region of origin. From out of a central stalk of rue serving as its base, there radiate multiple branches which appear to blossom into various designs; the divergent branches "sprout" at their extremities such magical symbols as: a rose; a hand holding either a wand or a sword; a flaming heart; a fish; a crescent moon; a snake; an owl; a plumed medieval helmet; a vervain blossom; a dolphin; a cock; and an eagle. One cimaruta, for example, might bear the collective imagery of a key, dagger, blossom and moon. Most are double-sided and fairly large—some almost four inches in width.

== In Neopaganism ==
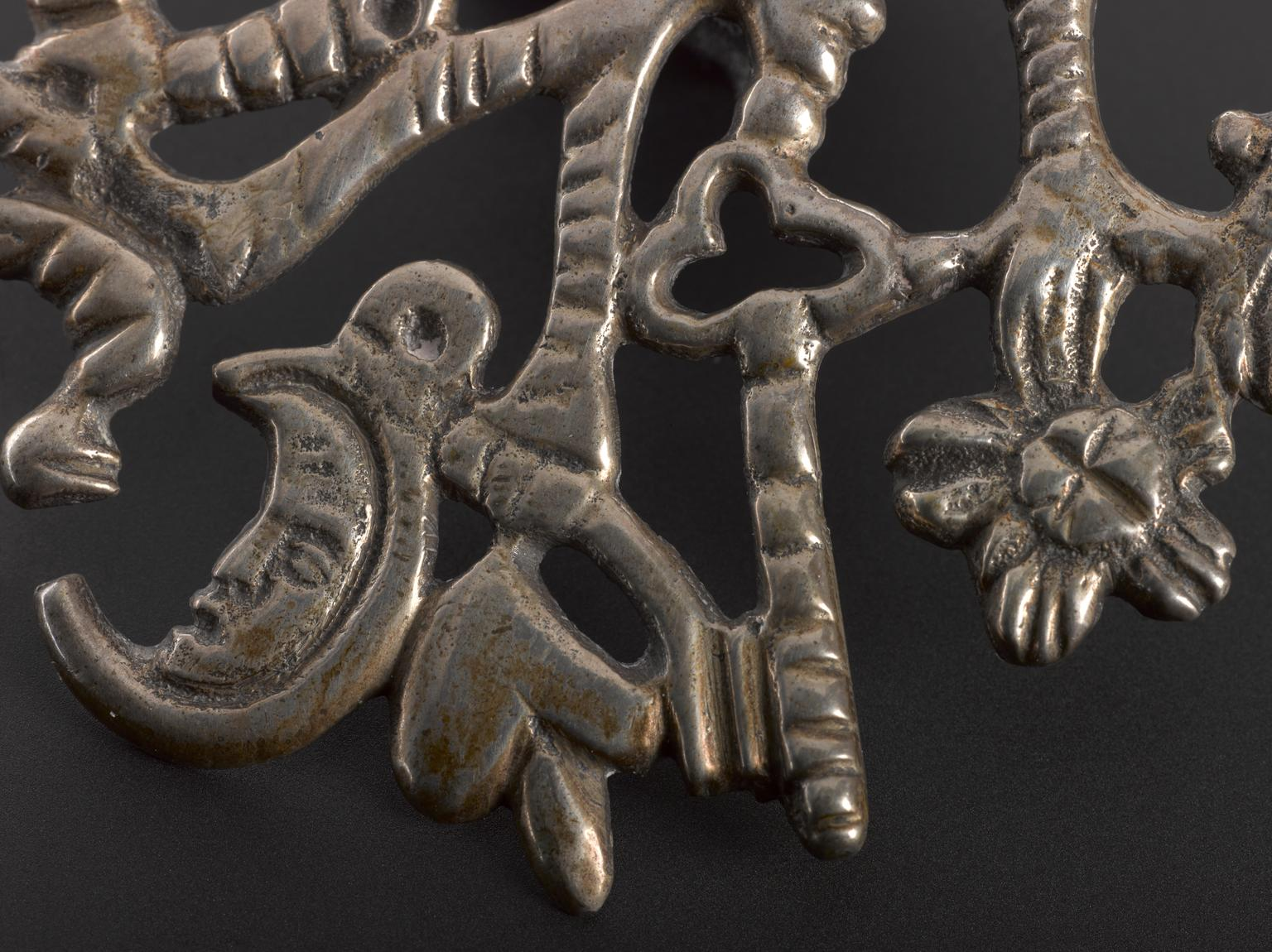
Branches of a cimaruta

Along with various other documented elements of regional magic traditions, the cimaruta is (alleged to be) in borrowed use amongst self-identified Italian-American witches. Some practitioners of the neopagan "religion of witchcraft" Stregoneria (or "Streghe") may consider it a remnant of a more ancient Italian magic tradition, such as that detailed by Charles Leland in his 1899 text Aradia, or the Gospel of the Witches (which—apart from directly influencing the development of Stregheria—claimed the existence of an insular pagan witch-cult active in Italy).

Some modern versions of the cimaruta are cast in bronze or pewter.

Author Raven Grimassi in his book The Cimaruta: And Other Magical Charms From Old Italy (2012) discusses the charm as a sign of membership in the "Society of Diana" which he refers to as an organization of witches. Grimassi argues that the Cimaruta was originally a witchcraft charm used by witches that was later arrogated by Italian Folk Magic, and that Christian symbols were then added to the original Pagan symbols.

== See also ==
- Homeopathic or imitative magic
