= Cocoyea =

Shaft of a coconut tree leaf

The cocoyea is a traditional hand broom made from the dried midribs of coconut palm fronds after the leaflets have been removed. It is commonly used for sweeping hard floors, yards, and removing cobwebs. Similar brooms have long been used across West Africa, where they are known by various local names, including ìgbálẹ̀ in Yoruba and azịza in Igbo.

In many West African cultures, the broom has cultural and symbolic significance beyond its practical use. It is often associated with cleanliness, discipline, and domestic order, and in some communities it features in traditional beliefs and customs. These include taboos discouraging sweeping at night, which is believed in some traditions to bring misfortune or disturb ancestral blessings. The cocoyea broom became widespread throughout the Caribbean, particularly in Trinidad and Tobago, where it was introduced during the transatlantic slave trade through the knowledge and cultural practices of enslaved Africans. It remains a familiar household tool and is recognized as part of the region’s African cultural heritage.
