= Ruda Maleniecka =

- Village
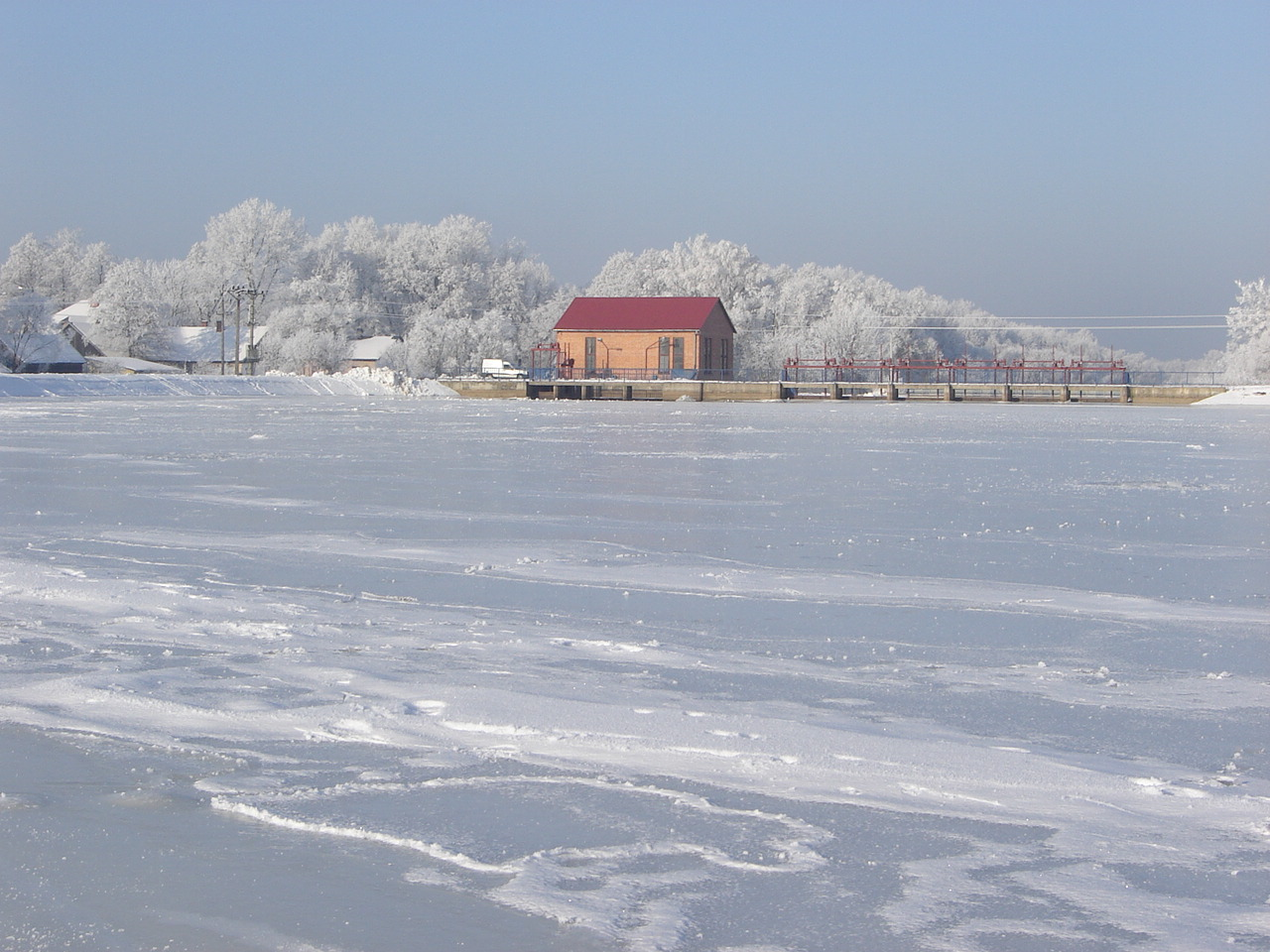
- Hydroelectric power plant

- Coat of arms

- Location within Poland
- Coordinates: 51°8′45″N 20°13′25″E
- Country: Poland
- Voivodeship: Świętokrzyskie
- County: Końskie
- Gmina: Ruda Maleniecka
- Population: 610

Ruda Maleniecka [ˈruda malɛˈɲɛt͡ska] is a village in Końskie County, Świętokrzyskie Voivodeship, in south-central Poland. It is the seat of the gmina (administrative district) called Gmina Ruda Maleniecka. It lies approximately 15 km (9 mi) south-west of Końskie and 41 km (25 mi) north-west of the regional capital Kielce.
