= Lipa =

Lipa, LipA, or LIPA (Cyrillic: Липа) may refer to:

== Acronym ==
- Liquid Isopropyl alcohol
- League for Independent Political Action, a former American progressive political organization
- Liverpool Institute for Performing Arts, a performing arts school in Liverpool, England
- Long Island Power Authority, a municipal subdivision of the State of New York
- Aviano Air Base (ICAO:LIPA), a NATO base in Italy
- Lysosomal lipase, an enzyme encoded by the gene LIPA
- Lipoyl synthase, an enzyme sometimes called LipA

== Places ==
=== Asia ===
- Lipa, Iran, Gilan Province, Iran
- Lipa, Batangas, a city in the Philippines
  - Archdiocese of Lipa

=== Europe ===
==== Bosnia and Herzegovina ====
- Lipa, Kreševo, a settlement in Kreševo
- Lipa, Livno, a village
- Lipa, Tomislavgrad, a village

==== Croatia ====
- Lipa, Karlovac County, a village near Generalski Stol, Croatia
- Lipa, Primorje-Gorski Kotar County, a village near Matulji, Croatia

==== Czech Republic ====
- Lípa (Havlíčkův Brod District), a municipality and village in the Vysočina Region
- Lípa (Zlín District), a municipality and village in the Zlín Region
- Lípa nad Orlicí, a municipality and village in the Hradec Králové Region
- Česká Lípa, a town in the Liberec Region
- Krásná Lípa, a town in the Ústí nad Labem Region
- Lípa, a village and part of Merklín (Karlovy Vary District) in the Karlovy Vary Region
- Lipá, a village and part of Třebenice (Litoměřice District) in the Ústí nad Labem Region
- Lípa, a village and part of Úněšov in the Plzeň Region
- Lípa, a village and part of Všestary (Hradec Králové District) in the Hradec Králové Region

==== Poland ====
- Lipa, Jawor County, Lower Silesian Voivodeship
- Lipa, Ząbkowice County, Lower Silesian Voivodeship
- Lipa, Łódź Voivodeship
- Lipa, Przemyśl County, Subcarpathian Voivodeship
- Lipa, Jędrzejów County, Świętokrzyskie Voivodeship
- Lipa, Końskie County, Świętokrzyskie Voivodeship
- Lipa, Stalowa Wola County, Subcarpathian Voivodeship
- Lipa, Ciechanów County, Masovian Voivodeship
- Lipa, Gostynin County, Masovian Voivodeship
- Lipa, Kozienice County, Masovian Voivodeship
- Lipa, Płońsk County, Masovian Voivodeship
- Lipa, Przasnysz County, Masovian Voivodeship
- Lipa, Pułtusk County, Masovian Voivodeship
- Lipa, Chodzież County, Greater Poland Voivodeship
- Lipa, Oborniki County, Greater Poland Voivodeship
- Lipa, Pomeranian Voivodeship

==== Slovenia ====
- Lipa, Beltinci, Municipality of Beltinci
- Lipa, Dobrepolje, Municipality of Dobrepolje
- Lipa, Lukovica, Municipality of Lukovica
- Lipa, Miren-Kostanjevica, Municipality of Miren-Kostanjevica
- Lipa, Zreče, Municipality of Zreče
- Lipa pri Frankolovem, Municipality of Vojnik

==== Other places in Europe ====
- Lipa, Estonia, a village in Rapla Parish
- Lipa, North Macedonia, a village in Negotino Municipality, North Macedonia

== Other uses ==
- Lipa (name)
  - Dua Lipa (born 1995), English singer and songwriter
    - Dua Lipa (album), 2017
- Lepa (ship) (also known as lipa), traditional houseboats of the Sama-Bajau people
- Lipa (political party), a political party in Slovenia
- The one-hundredth part of the Croatian kuna
- Lipa, a diminutive form of Lipman
- Lipa, a Slavic word for the European linden tree (Tilia spp.)
- League for Independent Political Action
- Lipa Schmeltzer (born 1978), American Hasidic singer

== See also ==
- Lippa (disambiguation)
- Lypa (disambiguation)
- Nova Lipa (disambiguation)
- Stara Lipa (disambiguation)
- Lipova (disambiguation)
- Leepa Valley, Azad Kahmir, Pakistan
  - Leepa, village
