= Lipova =

Lipova or Lipová may refer to places:

== Czech Republic ==
- Lipová (Cheb District), a municipality and village in the Karlovy Vary Region
- Lipová (Děčín District), a municipality and village in the Ústí nad Labem Region
- Lipová (Přerov District), a municipality and village in the Olomouc Region
- Lipová (Prostějov District), a municipality and village in the Olomouc Region
- Lipová (Zlín District), a municipality and village in the Zlín Region
- Lipová-lázně, a municipality and village in the Olomouc Region
- Lipová, a village and part of Chuderov in the Ústí nad Labem Region
- Lipová, a village and part of Volfířov in the South Bohemian Region

== Romania ==
- Lipova, Arad, a town in Arad County
- Lipova, Bacău, a commune in Bacău County
- Lipova (river), a river

== Slovakia ==
- Lipová, Nitra Region, a municipality and village in the Nitra Region
- Lipová, Prešov Region, a municipality and village in the Prešov Region

== Serbia ==
- Lipova (Vrnjačka Banja)

== See also ==
- Lipa (disambiguation)
- Lippa (disambiguation)
- Lipovica (disambiguation)
- Lipovice (disambiguation)
