= Řečice =

Řečice may refer to places in the Czech Republic:

- Řečice (Pelhřimov District), a municipality and village in the Vysočina Region
- Řečice (Žďár nad Sázavou District), a municipality and village in the Vysočina Region
- Řečice, a village and part of Blatná in the South Bohemian Region
- Řečice, a village and part of Volfířov in the South Bohemian Region
- Řečice, a village and part of Zábřezí-Řečice in the Hradec Králové Region
- Červená Řečice, a municipality and village in the Vysočina Region
- Kardašova Řečice, a municipality and village in the South Bohemian Region
