= Lippa =

Lippa may refer to:

- Lippa (sport) a game played in southern Europe and the Indian subcontinent
- Lippa, Ioannina (Greek: Λίππα), Ioannina, Greece
- Hungarian name for Lipova, a town in Arad County, Romania
- Kislippa, the Hungarian name for Lipa, Beltinci, Slovenia
- Lippa, Kinnaur, a village in Himachal Pradesh, India

== People with the surname ==
- Andrew Lippa, composer/lyricist
- Jeffrey Lippa, American actor

== See also ==
- Talpanas lippa (Kaua'i mole duck), an extinct species of duck
- Lipa (disambiguation)
- Lipovica (disambiguation)
- Lipovice (disambiguation), Czech Republic
- Lipowice, Poland
- Lippia, a genus of flowering plants in the verbena family
