= Lipovica =

Lipovica (Serbian Cyrillic: Липовица) is a Serbian toponym. It may refer to:

- Lipovica, Despotovac, a village in Serbia
- Lipovica, Lebane, a village in Serbia
- Lipovica, Leskovac, a village in Serbia
- Lipovica, Vlasotince, a village in Serbia
- Lipovica Hill, an elevation near Čokešina Monastery in Serbia, significant in the 1804 Battle of Čokešina
- Lipovica, Lipjan, a village in central Kosovo
- Lipovica, Leposavić, a locality in northern Kosovo
- Lipovica (peak in Kosovo), mountain peak in Kosovo

== See also ==
- Lipovička šuma, a forest near Belgrade, Serbia
- Lipovice (disambiguation)
- Lipovača (disambiguation)
- Lipovci, Slovenia
