= Muchówek =

- Village
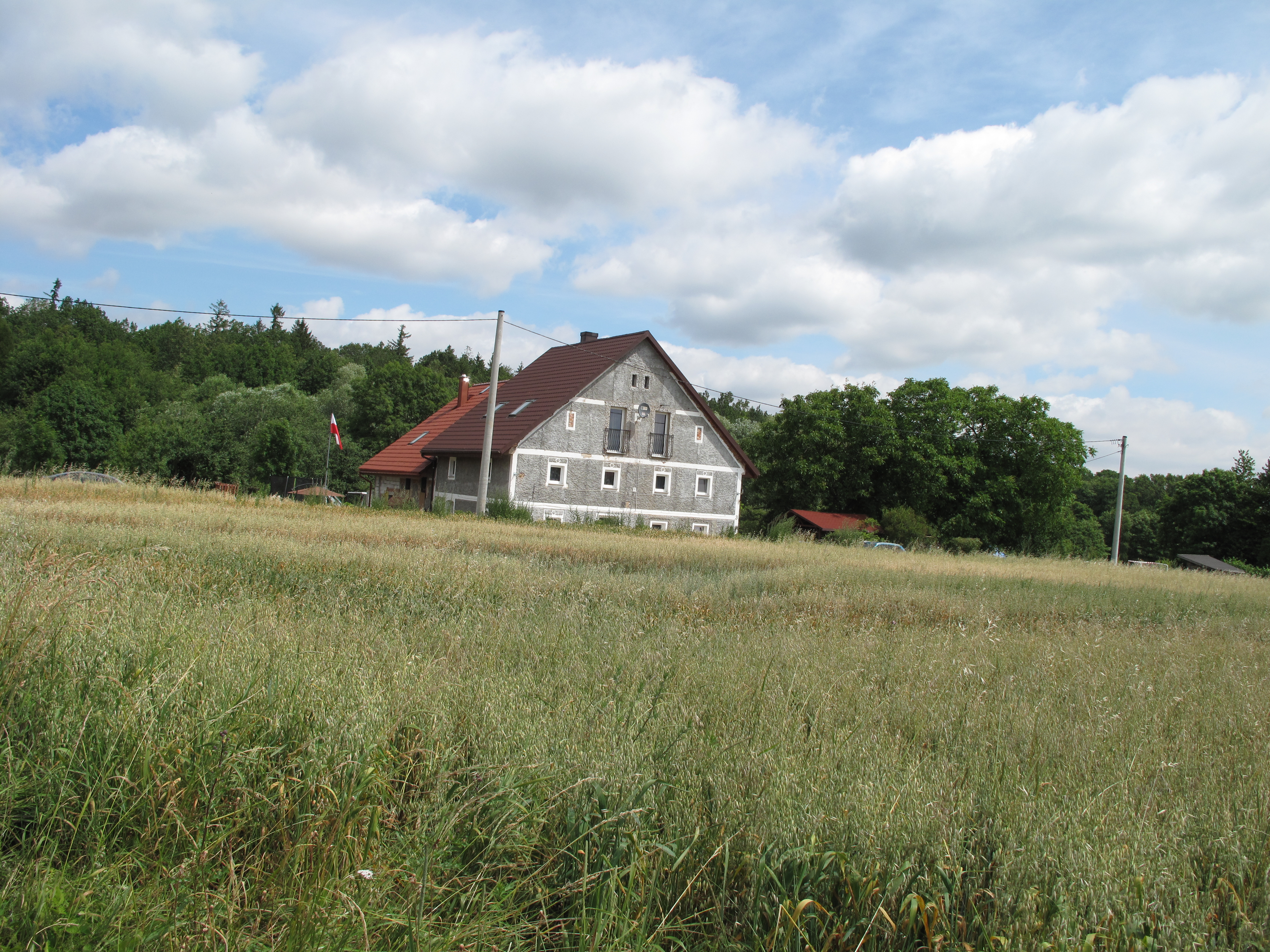
- House

- Location within Poland
- Coordinates: 50°59′N 16°00′E
- Country: Poland
- Voivodeship: Lower Silesian
- County: Jawor
- Gmina: Bolków
- Sołectwo: Lipa
- Population: 14
- Postal code: 59–420

Muchówek is a village in Gmina Bolków, Jawor County, Lower Silesian Voivodeship, in south-western Poland.

From 1975 to 1998 the village was in Jelenia Góra Voivodeship.

== Gallery ==
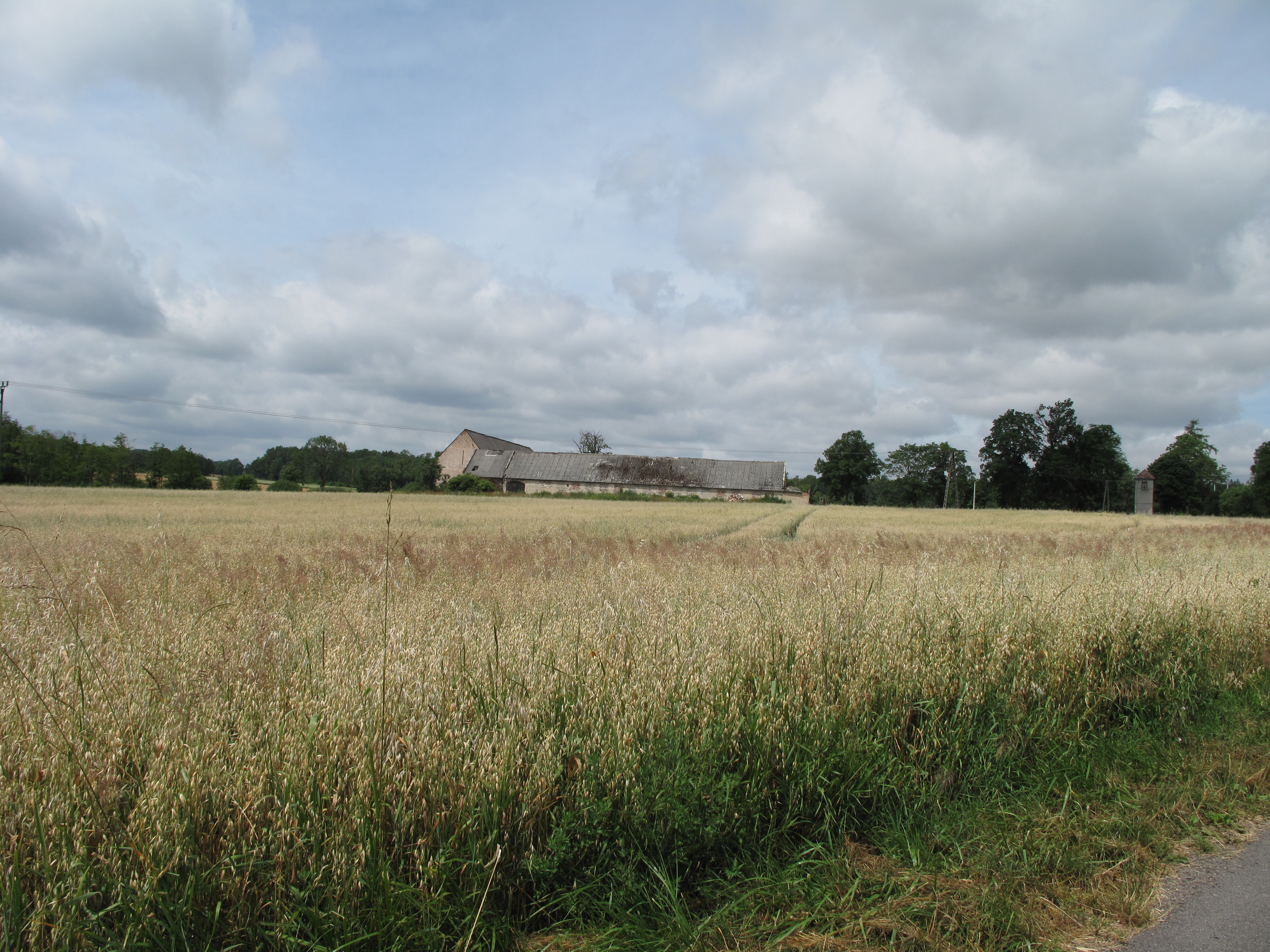
Farm from the distance

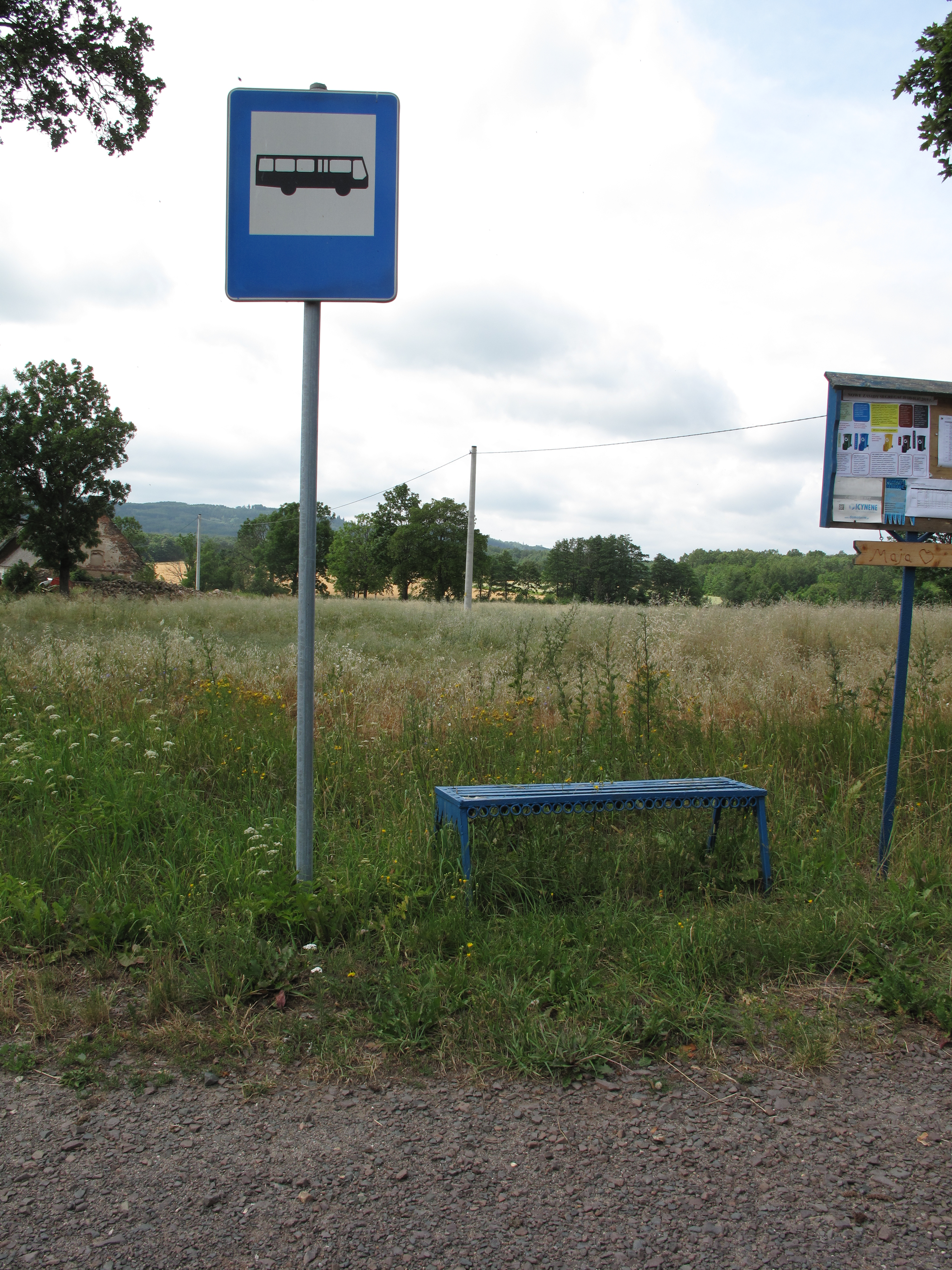
Bus stop

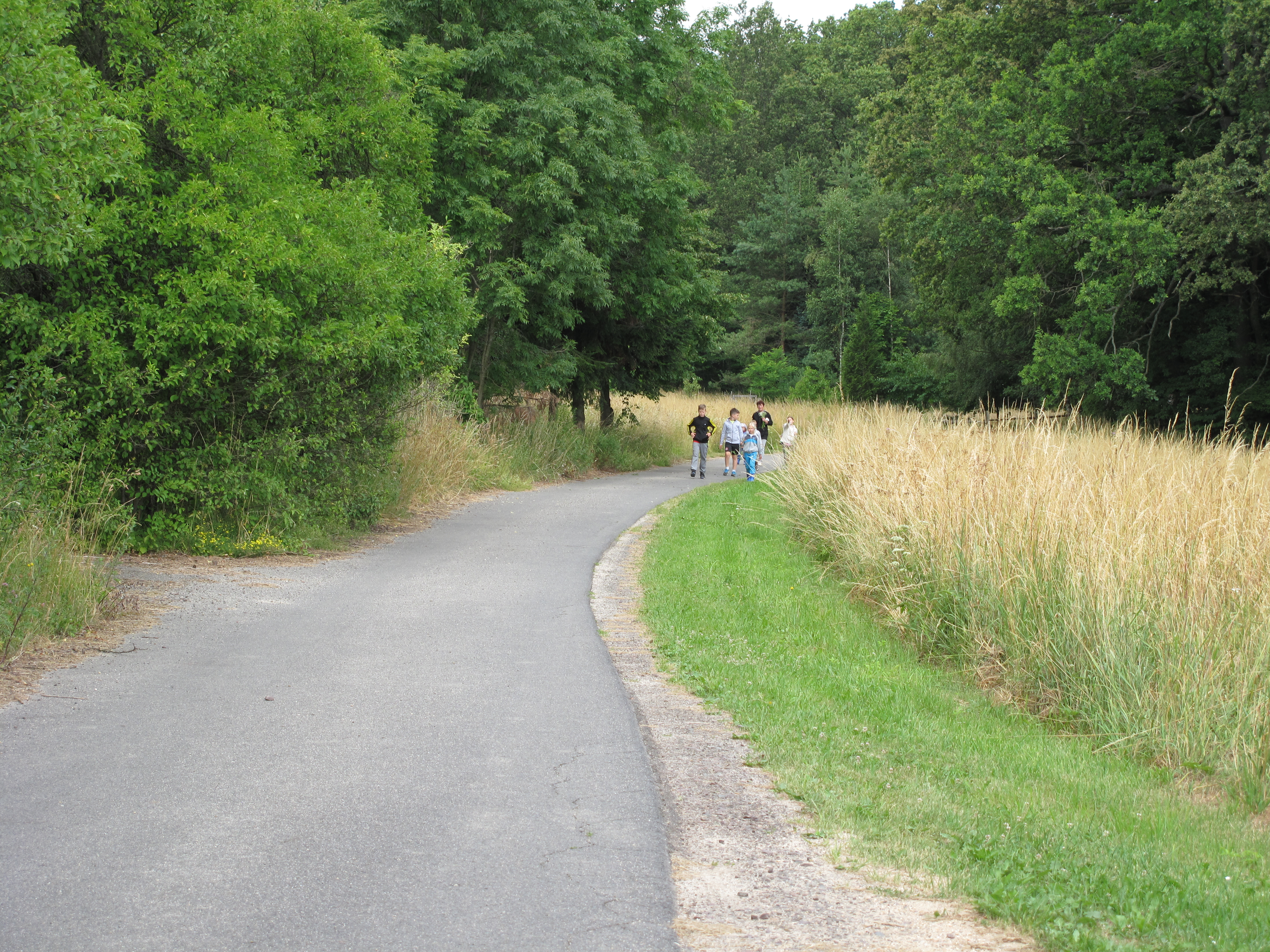
Children on the road

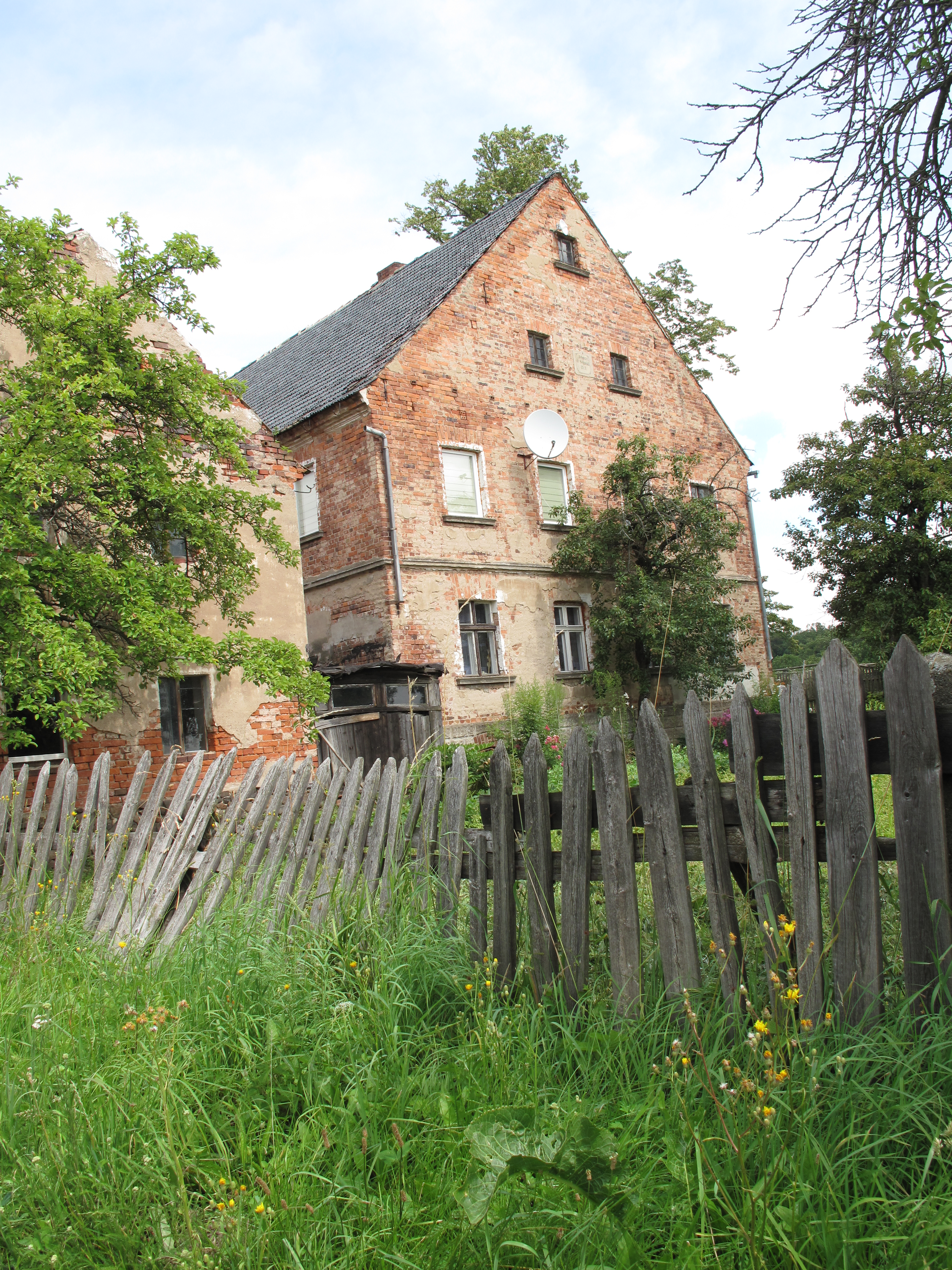
House
