= Lipovice =

Lipovice, or Lipovicë may refer to:

- Lipovice, Lopare, Bosnia and Herzegovina
- Lipovice (Kalesija), Bosnia and Herzegovina
- Lipovice (Prachatice District), Czech Republic
- Lipovicë, Lipjan, Kosovo
- Lipovicë, Gjilan, Kosovo
- Lipovica, Zvečan, Kosovo
- Lipovica, Leposavić, Kosovo

or:

- Lipovica (peak in Kosovo)

== See also ==
- Lipovica (disambiguation)
