= Ribar i Madh =

Ribar i Madh: Ribar i Madh (Albanian); Велико Рибаре/Veliko Ribare (Serbian)
- Village
- Location within Kosovo
- Coordinates: 42.509754°N 21.040340°E
- Location: Kosovo
- District: Prishtinë
- Municipality: Lipjan

Population (2024)
  - Total: 1,839
- Time zone: UTC+1 (CET)
  - Summer (DST): UTC+2 (CEST)

Ribar i Madh (Albanian: Ribar i Madh, Serbian Cyrillic: Велико Рибаре/Veliko Ribare) is a village in Lipjan municipality.
