= American Pop =

1981 film by Ralph Bakshi

- Theatrical release poster
- Directed by: Ralph Bakshi
- Written by: Ronni Kern
- Produced by: Ralph Bakshi; Martin Ransohoff
- Starring: Ron Thompson; Lisa Jane Persky; Jeffrey Lippa; Richard Singer; Marya Small
- Edited by: David Ramirez
- Music by: Lee Holdridge
- Production company: Bakshi Productions
- Distributed by: Columbia Pictures
- Release date: February 13, 1981
- Running time: 96 minutes
- Country: United States
- Language: English
- Budget: $5 million
- Box office: $6 million

American Pop is a 1981 American adult animated epic jukebox musical drama film starring Ron Thompson and produced and directed by Ralph Bakshi. It was the fourth animated feature film to be presented in Dolby sound. The film tells the story of four generations of the Belinskys, an immigrant family of musicians whose careers parallel the history of American popular music in the 20th century.

The majority of the film's animation was completed through rotoscoping, a process in which live actors are filmed and the subsequent footage is used for animators to draw over. However, the film also uses a variety of other media including water-colors, live-action shots, and archival footage.

== Plot ==
In Imperial Russia in about 1905, a rabbi's wife and her young son Zalmie escape to America while the rabbi is killed by the Cossacks. Shortly after their arrival in New York City, Zalmie is recruited by Louie, a performer at a burlesque house, to hand out chorus slips (sheets of paper with song chorus lyrics, used to enable audience members to sing along). As Zalmie grows into adolescence, he spends more time with Louie backstage at burlesque shows. When Zalmie's mother dies in the Triangle Shirtwaist Factory fire, he begins working with Louie full-time at a small theatre. Though Zalmie aspires to be a singer, he is beginning to enter puberty and his changing voice becomes a significant obstacle. When World War I strikes, Zalmie travels the globe performing for the troops as the bottom half of a pantomime horse and sustains a wound to his throat during a German air raid, which ends his singing career.

When Zalmie returns to New York, he briefly continues performing as a clown, and falls in love with a stripper named Bella, vowing to make her a famous singer and getting involved with mobsters in order to do so. After Zalmie impregnates her, he uses money from mob boss Nicky Palumbo to pay for their wedding. Bella achieves modest success, but she is killed after opening a package containing a bomb intended for Zalmie. Their son, Benny, who is already an introverted child, focuses all of his efforts into becoming a talented jazz pianist. Benny marries Palumbo's daughter at Zalmie's request and enlists to fight in World War II seeking redemption for his family, despite pleas from his father. Benny is killed in Nazi Germany when he stops to play on an abandoned piano and is caught off-guard by a Nazi soldier; Benny begins to play Lili Marleen and the Nazi closes his eyes in bliss, but when the song ends, the Nazi pauses only to thank Benny before riddling him and the piano with gunfire. Benny's wife and son, named Tony, now live in a suburban Long Island town, and they watch as Zalmie testifies against Palumbo on television, calling him a rat.

A teenage Tony steals his stepfather's car and drives across the country for four weeks. He ends up in Kansas, where he spends the day washing dishes at a diner and spends the night with a blonde, blue-eyed waitress. In California, Tony takes another job dishwashing, but soon grows tired of it and quits. A six-piece rock group invites him to write songs for them after hearing him playing a harmonica under their doorstep. The band becomes successful but slowly starts to decompose because of the heroin addictions of female lead singer Frankie Heart and Tony himself. Tony becomes addicted to drugs after being hospitalized from falling off a stage while on acid at one of Frankie's shows. Frankie and the band's drummer, Johnny Webb, marry but divorce after two weeks, and Frankie begins an affair with Tony. In Kansas, the band is set to perform after Jimi Hendrix, but Frankie overdoses backstage. Meanwhile, Tony meets a blonde, blue-eyed boy, Little Pete, whom Tony realizes is his son, conceived the night he spent with the waitress.

Tony moves back to New York City accompanied by Pete, where he becomes heavily involved with drug dealing. Pete makes a small amount of money playing the acoustic guitar, but Tony takes any money that Pete earns to buy drugs for himself. One day, Tony and Pete argue over the latter's guitar, where Pete implies that he knows Tony is his father. After he tells the story of his own father, Tony gives Benny's harmonica to Pete, then takes Pete's guitar to pawn it, telling Pete to wait on the city bench they're at. The next morning, a man approaches Pete and gives him a small package of drugs to sell and the pawn slip for his guitar and tells Pete that Tony said goodbye to him. After years of selling drugs to rock bands, Pete refuses to sell the band members any more cocaine unless they are willing to listen to his music. Playing "Night Moves", his talent stuns both the band and the management and they agree to record and hire him on the spot. Eventually, Pete performs in concert with the band to roaring cheers from the crowd.

== Cast ==
- Ron Thompson as Tony Belinsky / Pete Belinsky
- Lisa Jane Persky as Bella
- Jeffrey Lippa as Zalmie Belinsky
- Richard Singer as Benny Belinsky
- Jerry Holland as Louie
- Mews Small as Frankie Hart
- Hilary Beane as Showgirl
- Robert Beecher as Hobo No. 2
- Gene Borkan as Izzy
- Beatrice Colen as Prostitute
- Frank de Kova as Crisco
- Ben Frommer as Nicky Palumbo
- Roz Kelly as Eva Tanguay
- Amy Levitt as Nancy
- Richard Moll as Poet
- Joey Camen as Freddie
- Elsa Raven as Hannele
- Vincent Schiavelli as Theatre Owner
- Leonard Stone as Leo
- Eric Taslitz as Little Pete
- Lynda Wiesmeier as The Blonde
- Elya Baskin as Tuba Player
- Lee Ving as Punk Rocker
- Ralph Bakshi as Piano Player

== Production ==
Actor Ron Thompson as Pete on the set of American Pop

Following the production struggles of The Lord of the Rings, Ralph Bakshi decided that it was time to work on something more personal. He pitched American Pop to Columbia Pictures president Daniel Melnick. Bakshi wanted to produce a film with an extensive soundtrack of songs which would be given an entirely new context in juxtaposition to the visuals in a film. While the film does not reflect Bakshi's own experiences, its themes were strongly influenced by individuals he had encountered in Brownsville. The film's crew included character layout and design artist Louise Zingarelli, Vita, Barry E. Jackson, and Marcia Adams, each of whom brought their own personal touch to the film. Bakshi once again used rotoscoping in an attempt to capture the range of emotions and movement required for the film's story. According to Bakshi, "Rotoscoping is terrible for subtleties, so it was tough to get facial performances to match the stage ones."

The punk band Fear appeared in the film: Fear lead singer Lee Ving acted under the name Lee James Jude.

Actor Elya Baskin performed in the film in an early role as a tuba player.

The finale featured laser effects by Laserium.

== Music ==
The score for American Pop was composed by Lee Holdridge. As the result of his reputation as an innovator of adult animation, Bakshi was able to acquire the rights to an extensive soundtrack, including songs by Bob Dylan, Jefferson Airplane, Janis Joplin, The Doors, George Gershwin, The Mamas & the Papas, Herbie Hancock, Lou Reed and Louis Prima, for under $1,000,000 in permissions fees. Due to music clearance issues, the film was not released on home video until 1998.

=== Track listing ===
==== Side A ====
1. "Hell Is for Children" (Neil Giraldo, Pat Benatar, Roger Capps) – Pat Benatar
2. "Summertime" – Big Brother and the Holding Company
3. "California Dreamin'" – The Mamas & the Papas
4. "This Train" – Peter, Paul and Mary
5. "Somebody to Love" – Marcy Levy

==== Side B ====
1. "Purple Haze" – The Jimi Hendrix Experience
2. "Take Five" – The Dave Brubeck Quartet
3. "You Send Me" – Sam Cooke
4. "Turn Me Loose" – Fabian Forte
5. "People Are Strange" – The Doors

== Reception and legacy ==
The film was a success upon its February 12, 1981, release.

=== Retrospective reviews ===
On Rotten Tomatoes, the film has an approval rating of 65% based on 20 reviews, with an average rating of 5.90/10. Metacritic, which uses a weighted average, assigned the film a score of 57 out of 100, based on 8 critics, indicating "mixed or average" reviews.

Ain't It Cool News head writer Harry Knowles wrote that American Pop was his favorite Ralph Bakshi film. Slate magazine said the film was a "rock-star epic, a cartoon movie for and about grown-ups, in both style and substance."

Michael Barrier, an animation historian, described American Pop as one of two films that demonstrated "that Bakshi was utterly lacking in the artistic self-discipline that might have permitted him to outgrow his limitations." Conversely, Jerry Beck called it "one of Bakshi's best films".

In 2008, director Hype Williams and Kanye West paid tribute to the film in the music video for West's single "Heartless", which featured use of rotoscoped animation and references to scenes and backgrounds from the film.

On January 12, 2014, at The Egyptian Theatre in Hollywood, California, there was a special screening of American Pop with actors Ron Thompson and Mews Small in attendance; it was the first time lead actor Ron Thompson had ever introduced the film before a live audience.

At the Aero Theatre in Santa Monica, California on March 27, 2015, there was a screening of American Pop with director Ralph Bakshi, Ron Thompson and Mews Small attending.
