= Llugaxhi =

Llugaxhi Lugadžija
- Village
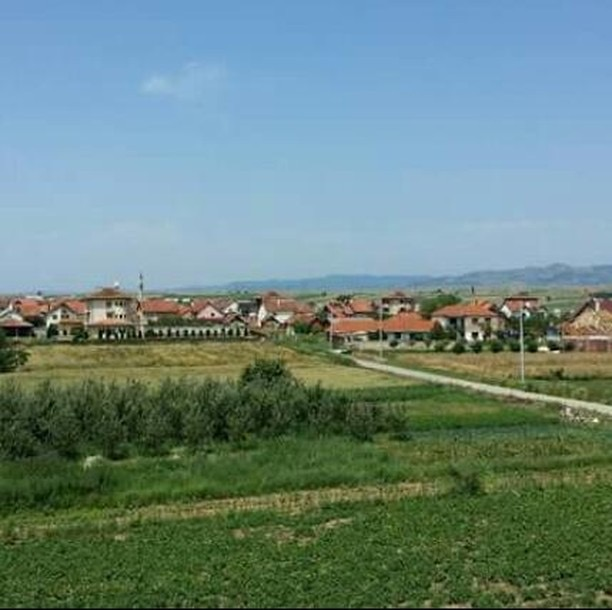
- View from south side of the village

- Location in Kosovo
- Country: Kosovo
- District: Pristina
- Municipality: Lipjan

Population (2024)
  - Total: 923
- Time zone: UTC+1 (CET)
  - Summer (DST): UTC+2 (CEST)

Llugaxhi (in Albanian, pronounced [luga-dʒi]) or Lugadžija (Serbian Cyrillic: Лугаџија) is a village in Kosovo, located south of Lipjan.

The village was founded by Muhaxhir-Albanians all of whom fled the invasion of Niš (Albanian: Nish) during 1878. Forced to abandon their belongings and dwellings, the families made their way to Gadime. They were later granted land further outside the town where they could create the new village. Many families now inhabit Llugaxhi, such as the Ratkoceri, Konjufca, Reçica, the Magashi, the Byqmeti, the Islami (subfamily of Reçica), the Tmava and others. Most roads in Llugaxhi are named after family ancestors, such as Sefë Reçica and Sherif Konjufca.

Llugaxhi is a medium-sized village, it covers roughly 2.8 km of the M-2 (Ujmani-Han Elez), most of it being land for cropping and only a small amount of land is slightly urbanised. The oldest building is the mosque which is said to be around 100 years old. Llugaxhi is known for being one of the first ethnically Albanian villages to teach primary education in the region after the Balkan wars, with the first school opening in 1924–25. During this time all schools in the region of Prishtina could only be allowed to teach Serbo-Croatian, despite the hardships, Albanian was taught secretly up until 1941 when it became permissible under the new Yugoslavian government.
