= Lipjan =

Lipjan: Lipjan or Lipjani (Albanian) Lipljan or Липљан (Serbian)
- City and municipality
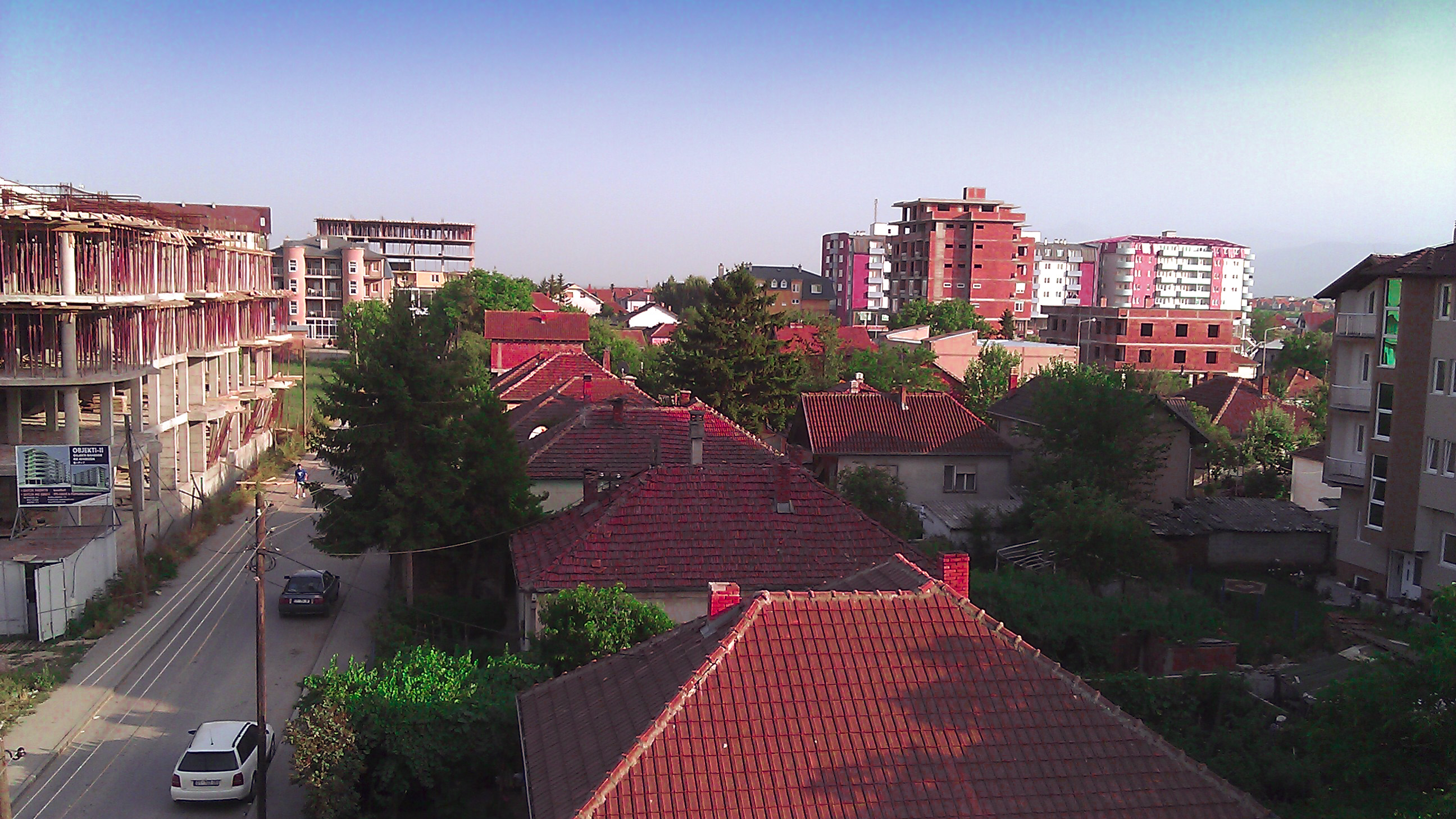
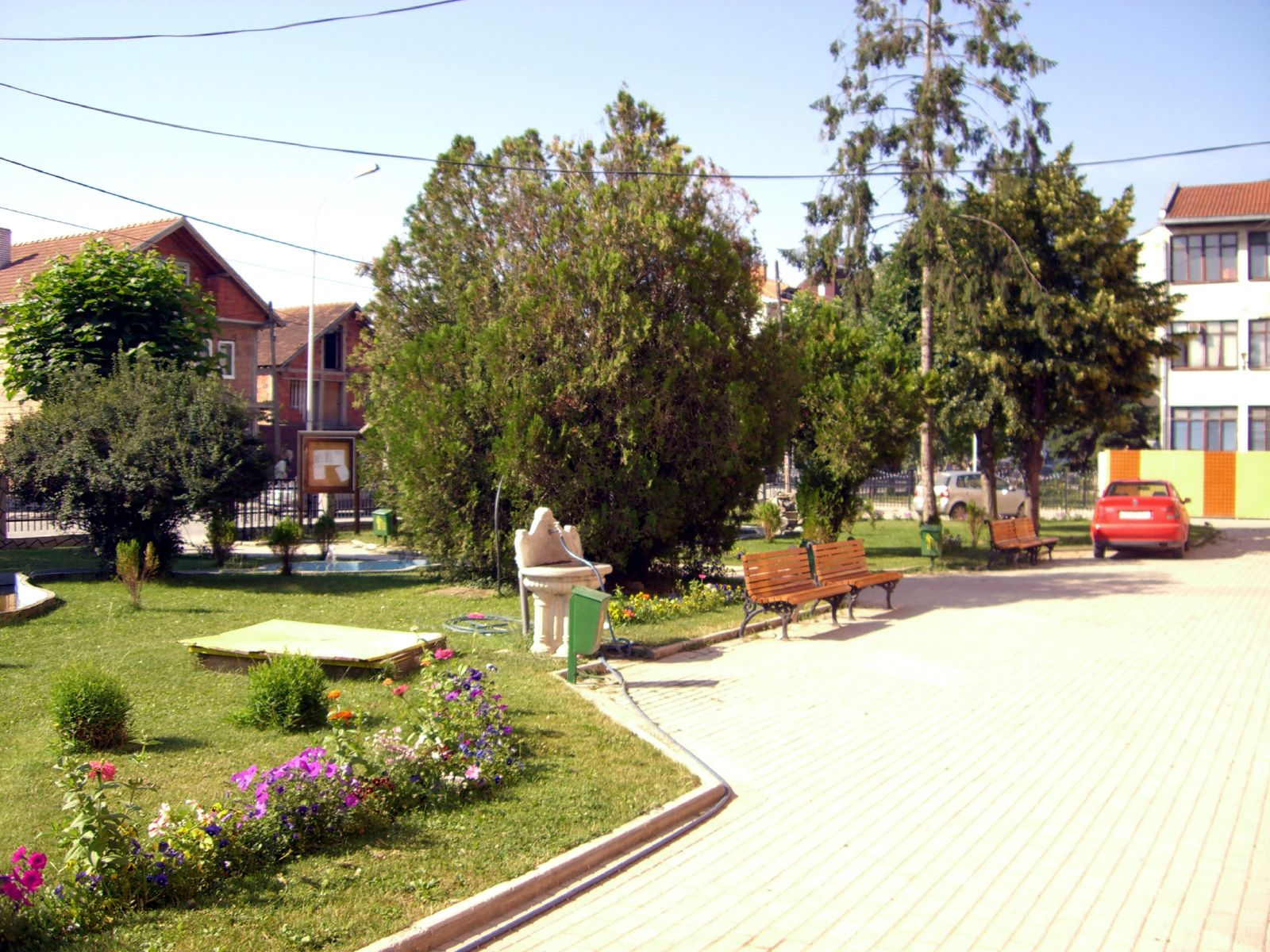
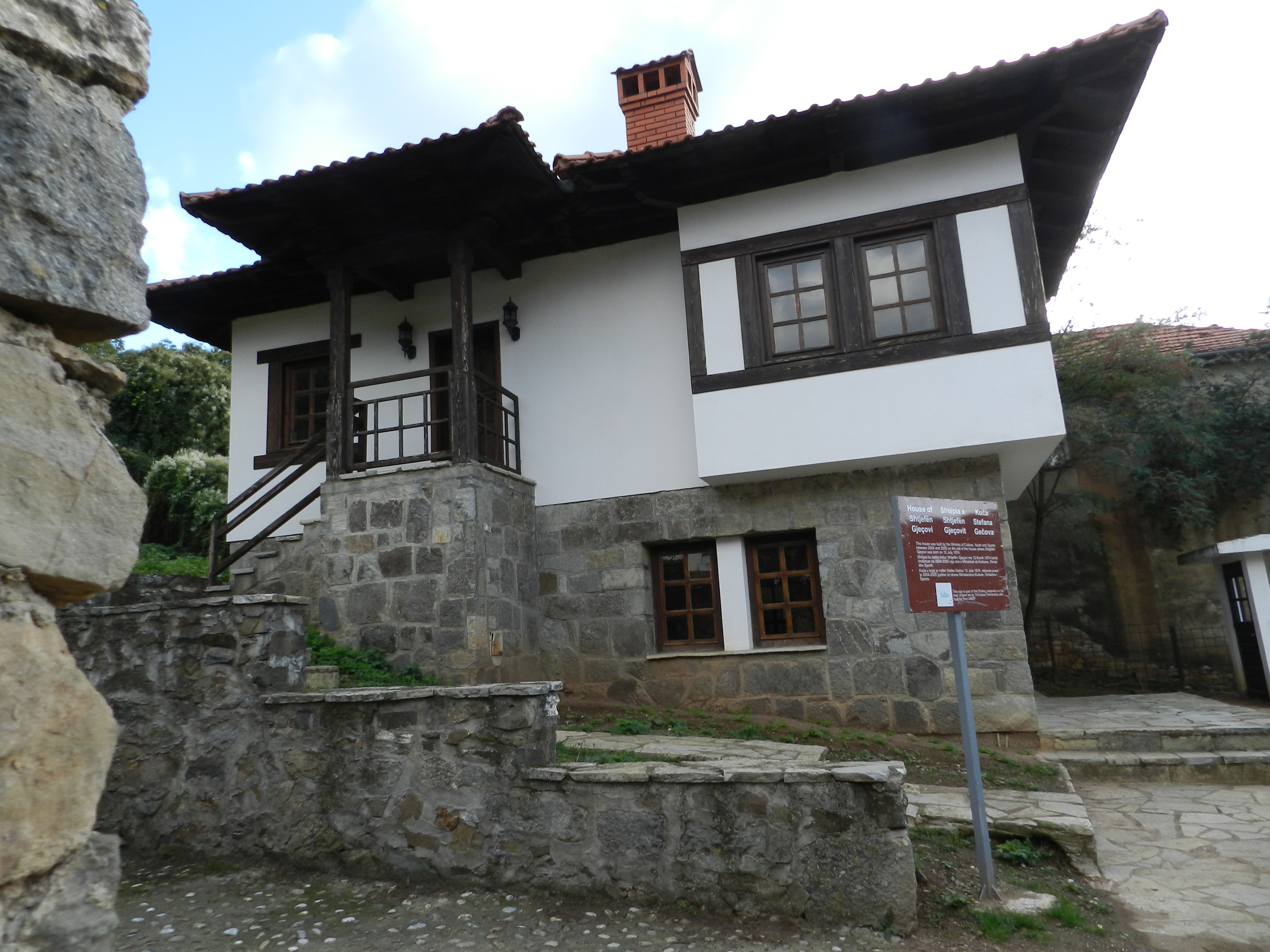
- View of Lipjan City Park House Museum of Shtjefën Gjeçovi

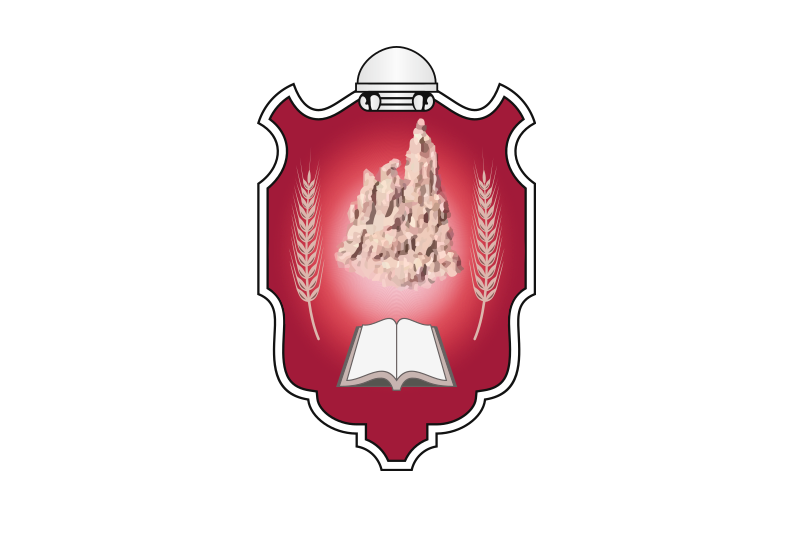
- Flag Emblem
- Interactive map of Lipjan
- Location within Kosovo
- Coordinates: 42°31′17″N 21°07′22″E
- Country: Kosovo
- District: District of Pristina
- Named for: Ulpiana

Government
  - Mayor: Imri Ahmeti (LDK)

Area
  - Municipality: 338 km^{2} (131 sq mi)
  - Rank: 15th in Kosovo
- Elevation: 550 m (1,800 ft)

Population (2024)
  - Municipality: 55,044
  - Urban: 13,092
  - Ethnicity: 94.2% Albanians; 5.8% Other
- Demonym(s): Albanian: Lipjanas (m), Lipjanase (f)
- Time zone: UTC+1 (CET)
  - Summer (DST): UTC+2 (CEST)
- Postal code: 14000
- Area code: +383 38
- Vehicle registration: 01
- Website: kk.rks-gov.net/lipjan

Lipjan (Albanian definite form: Lipjani) or Lipljan (Serbian Cyrillic: Липљан) is a city and municipality located in the District of Pristina in Kosovo. According to 2024 census, the municipality had 55,044 inhabitants, of whom 13,092 lived in the urban area.

== Name ==
The name of the city derives from Ulpiana, a nearby Dardanian and Roman era settlement, possibly due to either a Ul- to Li- shift seen elsewhere in Roman toponyms. Ulpiana was named in honor of Roman Emperor Marcus Ulpius Traianus. The neo-Latin form Lypenion occurs for the first time in a Byzantine text from 1018 AD . The shift from Ulpiana to Lipjan is in accordance with early Albanian phonetic rules, and the city must therefore, according to P. Selami, have been inhabited by Albanians.

== History ==
=== Early Period ===
The ancient predecessor of Lipjan, the Roman settlement of Ulpiana, was an important town in the Illyrian and Dardanian spheres. By the 2nd century CE, it was the economic, political and culture centre of the province of Dardania. It was situated on a road between ancient Naissus and Lissus, called Via de Zenta. It suffered from barbarian raids, especially the incursion of 517CE, and from a great earthquake that damaged much of Dardania. By the time Justinian I began his restoration of the Byzantine Empire, Ulpiana was in a ruinous condition - after repairing the town, Justinian labelled it Justiniana Secunda. Ulpiana also played an important ecclesiastical role, having had a local bishop present at the Council of Serdica in 347CE and at the Ecumenic Synod of 553CE. Florus and Laurus were said to have settled in Ulpiana.

=== Middle Ages ===
In the early Middle Ages the city was part of the Bulgarian Empire and a diocese of the Archbishopric of Ohrid. In 1018 it was recaptured by the Byzantines. In the period between the 13th and 15th centuries Lipjan was part of the Kingdom (later Empire) of Serbia and of the Serbian Despotate.The church of the Presentation of the Mother of God was rebuilt to its present-day form as seat of the Serbian Orthodox Eparchy of Lipljan.

According to some modern authors, Lipjan may also be the birthplace of Lekë Dukagjini (1410–1481), an Albanian noble whose realm was located in Northern Albania.

=== Ottoman Era ===
Since the second half of the 15th century until 1913, Lipjan was part of the Ottoman Empire.

=== Kosovo War and Aftermath ===
During and after the Kosovo War, Lipjan was the site of war crimes and atrocities which affected both Albanian and Serbian civilians. In July 1998, 22 Serb civilians were murdered in the nearby village of Kleçka/Klečka, allegedly by KLA members. In April 1999, ethnic Albanians were forced out of the area by Serb forces, and their properties were looted and burned by said forces. Serbian paramilitary forces were alleged to have shot more than 50 Albanian civilians in 3 surrounding villages. Immediately after the war, during the Staro Gracko massacre, 14 Serb farmers were slaughtered. During the 2004 unrest, the majority of local Serb families were forced out of the area, with their houses and properties burned down.

== Geography ==
Lipjan is located in the central part of the Republic of Kosovo and at the crossroads of important roads in the region. The city is located south of Pristina at a distance of around 17 km (11 mi). The Municipality of Lipjan contains 422 km^{2} (163 sq mi) of land, and it consists of 70 villages. It borders the municipalities of Drenas, Kosovo Polje and Pristina to the north, Malisheva to the west, Novo Brdo and Gjilan to the east and Ferizaj, Suva Reka and Shtime to the south.

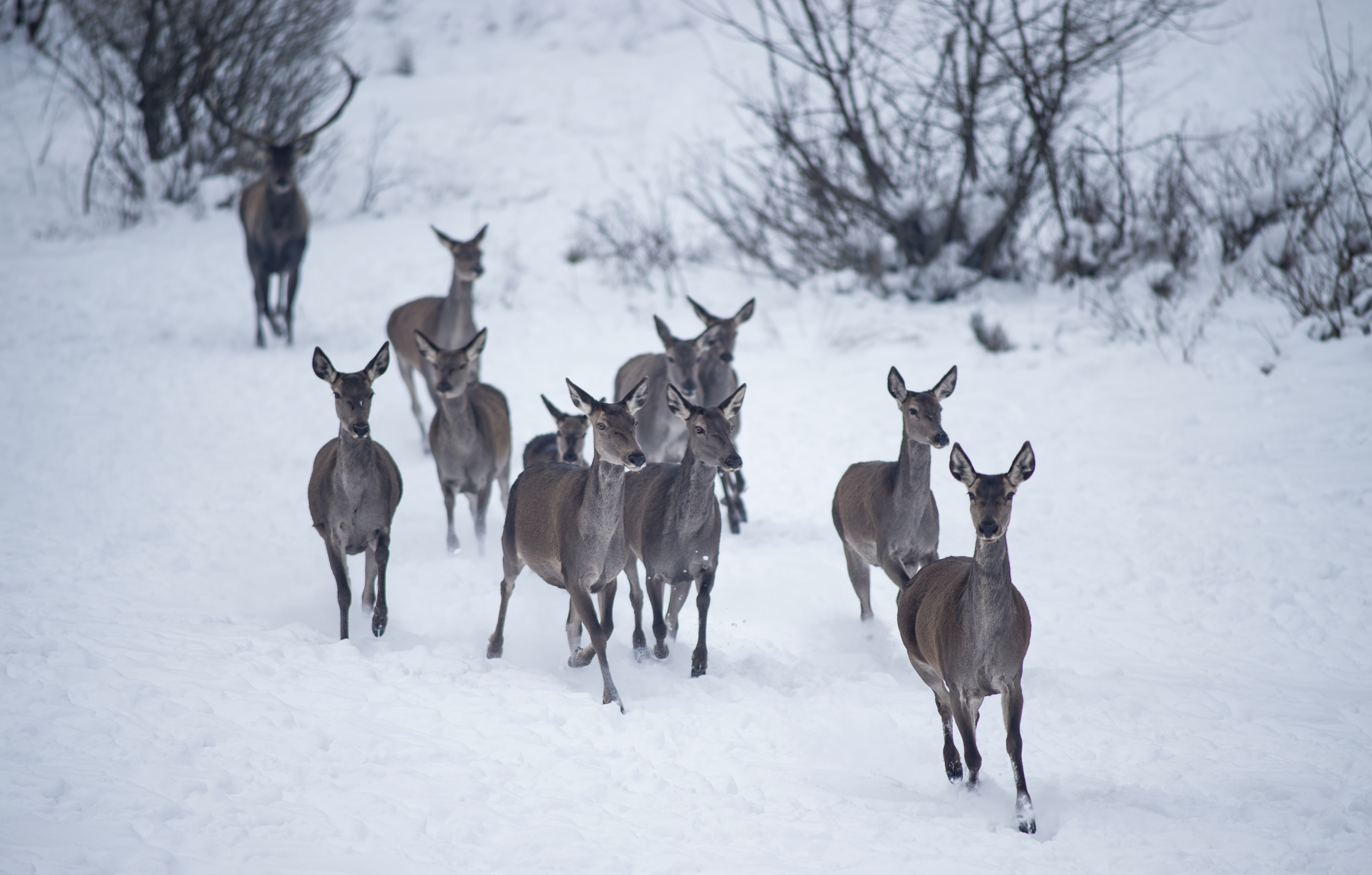
Deers in Blinaja, a protected park that is located in the municipality of Lipjan.

== Demographics ==
Municipal historical population
| Year | Pop. | ±% p.a. |
|---|---|---|
| 1948 | 29,700 | — |
| 1953 | 33,132 | +2.21% |
| 1961 | 38,573 | +1.92% |
| 1971 | 47,526 | +2.11% |
| 1981 | 57,705 | +1.96% |
| 1991 | 69,451 | +1.87% |
| 2011 | 57,605 | −0.93% |
| 2024 | 55,044 | −0.35% |

The municipality of Lipjan has 55,044 inhabitants according to the 2024 census, compared to 57,605 in 2011. The city of Lipjan has 13,092 inhabitants.

=== Ethnic groups ===
The ethnic composition of the municipality of Lipjan:

| Ethnic group | 2011 census | in % | 2024 census | in % |
|---|---|---|---|---|
| Albanians | 54,467 | 94.55 | 51,861 | 94.22 |
| Ashkali | 1,812 | 3.15 | 1,891 | 3.44 |
| Serbs | 513 | 0.89 | 569 | 1.03 |
| Romani | 342 | 0.59 | 318 | 0.58 |
| Others | 471 | 0.82 | 405 | 0.73+ |
| Total | 57,605 | 100.00 | 55,044 | 100.00 |

=== Religions ===
The religious composition of the municipality of Lipjan:

| Religion | 2011 census | in % | 2024 census | in % |
|---|---|---|---|---|
| Islam | 56,384 | 97.88 | 53,635 | 97.44 |
| Eastern Orthodoxy | 520 | 0.90 | 533 | 0.96+ |
| Roman Catholicism | 572 | 0.99 | 455 | 0.82+ |
| Others | 7 | 0.01 | 75 | 0.13+ |
| No religion | 6 | 0.01 | 50 | 0.08+ |
| Prefer not to answer | 68 | 0.12 | 296 | 0.57+ |
| Unavailable | 48 | 0.09- | - | - |
| Total | 57,605 | 100.00 | 55,044 | 100.00 |

== Municipality ==
- Akllap/Oklap
- Babush i Muhaxherëve/Muhadžer Babuš
- Baicë/Banjica
- Banullë/Bandulić
- Breg i Zi/Crni Breg
- Brus
- Bujan/Bujance
- Bukovicë/Bukovica
- Divlakë/Divljaka
- Dobrajë e Madhe/Velika Dobranja
- Dobrajë e Vogël/Mala Dobranja
- Gadime e Epërme/Gornje Gadimlje
- Gadime e Ulët/Donje Gadimlje
- Gllanicë/Glanica
- Gllavicë/Glavica
- Gllogoc/Glogovce
- Grackë e Vjetër/Staro Gracko
- Grackë e Vogël/Malo Gracko
- Gumnasellë/Guvno Selo
- Hallaç i Madh/Veliki Alaš
- Hallaç i Vogël/Mali Alaš
- Hanroc/Androvac
- Janjevo/Janjevë
- Kleçkë/Klečka
- Kojskë/Konjsko
- Konjuh
- Kraishtë/Krajište
- Krojmir/Krajmirovce
- Leletiq/Laletić
- Lipovica
- Livađe/Livagjë
- Llugaxhi/Lugadžija
- Llugë/Lug
- Magura
- Marec/Marevce
- Medvec/Medvece
- Mirenë/Mirena
- Okosnicë/Okosnica
- Plitkoviq/Plitković
- Poturoc/Poturovce
- Qellapek/Čelopek
- Qyqylagë/Čučuljaga
- Resinoc/Rusinovce
- Ribar i Madh/Veliko Ribare
- Ribar i Vogël/Malo Ribare
- Ruboc/Rabovce
- Rufc i Ri/Novo Rujce
- Rufc i Vjetër/Staro Rujce
- Shalë/Sedlare
- Shisharkë/Šišarka
- Sllovi/Slovinje
- Smallushë/Smoluša
- Teqë/Teća
- Topličane
- Torina/Torinë
- Trbovce/Tërbuc
- Varigoc/Varigovce
- Vërshec/Vrševce
- Vogaçicë/Vogačica
- Vrelo
- Vrellë e Goleshit/Goleško Vrelo
- Zlokućane

== See also ==
- Municipalities of Kosovo
- Cities and towns in Kosovo
- Populated places in Kosovo
- Staro Gracko massacre
- Lekë Dukagjini
