= Shalë, Lipjan =

Shalë: Shalë (Albanian)
- Village
- Interactive map of Shalë
- Coordinates: 42°30′09″N 20°55′15″E
- Country: Kosovo
- District: Prishtinë
- Municipality: Lipjan

Population (2024)
  - Total: 1,942
- Time zone: UTC+1 (CET)
  - Summer (DST): UTC+2 (CEST)

Shalë (Albanian: Shalë; Serbian Cyrillic: Седларе/Sedlare) is a village in the municipality of Lipjan, Kosovo. The village originally known as Sedllar, was recorded in the registers of the Kosovo vilayet in 1820 and 1893.

== Geography ==
Shalë, a village in Kosovo, is strategically situated near the intersection of the Pristina-Prizren and Pristina-Peja road axes, approximately 26 kilometers from the municipality of Lipjan and 35 kilometers from Pristina, the capital of the Republic of Kosovo. The village lies on the Drenica River plain.

The village's highest point is Bajrak (873 m) and the lowest is at Ura e Ali Rexha (570 m).

== Characteristics ==
Shalë is a mountainous village characterized by two steep slopes on its western side, with a road connected to Llapushë nestled between them. Until the 1990s, the area was home to ancient oak trees in the forest. Every neighbourhood featured a watermill in the Shalë Gorge.

Population History
Year	Pop.	-+%
1948	733	–
1953	820	+11.9%
1961	972	+18.5%
1971	1,245	+28.1%
1981	1,735	+39.4%
1991	2,294	+32.2%
2011	2,517	+9.7%
