= Lypa =

LYPA or Lypa may refer to:

- Yurii Lypa (1900-1944), Ukrainian writer, poet, social and political leader, translator and medical practitioner
- Ivan Lypa (1865-1923), Ukrainian writer, doctor, and political activist; see Brotherhood of Tarasivtsi (wrong article name)
- Lypa (river), a left tributary of Styr, Ukraine
- LYPA, ICAO code for Pančevo Airport, Serbia
- LYPA, callsign of Lithuanian warwhip Žemaitis, originally Danish warship HDMS Flyvefisken (P550)

== See also ==
- Lipa (disambiguation)
