= Lipa, Kreševo =

Village in Federation of Bosnia and Herzegovina

Lipa
- Village
- Location within Bosnia and Herzegovina
- Coordinates: 43.8780862°N 18.0277466°E
- Country: Bosnia and Herzegovina
- Entity: Federation of Bosnia and Herzegovina
- Canton: Central Bosnia
- Municipality: Kreševo

Area
  - Total: 0.56 sq mi (1.44 km^{2})

Population (2013)
  - Total: 66
  - Density: 120/sq mi (46/km^{2})
- Time zone: UTC+1 (CET)
  - Summer (DST): UTC+2 (CEST)

Lipa is a village in the municipality of Kreševo, Bosnia and Herzegovina.

== Demographics ==
According to the 2013 census, its population was 66.

Ethnicity in 2013
Ethnicity	Number	Percentage
Croats	63	95.5%
Serbs	1	1.5%
other/undeclared	2	3.0%
Total	66	100%
