= Lipa (name) =

Lipa may refer to the following people:

== Given name ==
- Lipa Schmeltzer (born 1978), American Hassidic entertainer

== Surname ==
- Andreas Lipa (born 1971), Austrian football manager and former footballer
- Dua Lipa (born 1995), English-Albanian singer, songwriter and model
- Elisabeta Lipă (born 1964), Romanian rower and government official
- Joe Lipa, Philippine basketball coach
- Mateusz Lipa (born 1994), Polish racing cyclist
- Peter Lipa (born 1943), Slovak singer, composer and promoter of jazz
- Shaily Lipa (born 1974), Israeli cookbook author
- Stefan Lipa (born 1953), New Zealand politician
