= Lipovicë, Lipjan =

Lipovicë Lipovica
- Village
- Location within Kosovo
- Coordinates: 42.5073°N 20.9908°E
- Location: Kosovo
- District: Pristina
- Municipality: Lipjan

Population (2024)
  - Total: 0
- Time zone: UTC+1 (CET)
  - Summer (DST): UTC+2 (CEST)

Lipovicë or Lipovica (Albanian: Lipovicë/Lipovica, Serbian Cyrillic: Липовица) is a village in Lipjan municipality. It is next to the Blinaja Park where people go hunting in Kosovo.
