= Nova Lipa =

Nova Lipa may refer to:

- Nova Lipa, Croatia, a village near Požega
- Nova Lipa, Slovenia, a village near Črnomelj
