= Stara Lipa =

Stara Lipa can refer to one of the following towns:

- Stara Lipa, Črnomelj, a village in southeastern Slovenia
- Stara Lipa, Croatia, a village near Požega
