= Jeffrey Lippa =

American actor (born 1951)

- Born: United States
- Occupation: Actor
- Spouse: Amanda Boyington-Lippa (m. 2000)
- Children: 1

Jeffrey Lippa is an American actor best known for his roles in such films and television series as American Pop, Alice and Murder, She Wrote.
