= Lipa, Lukovica =

Lipa
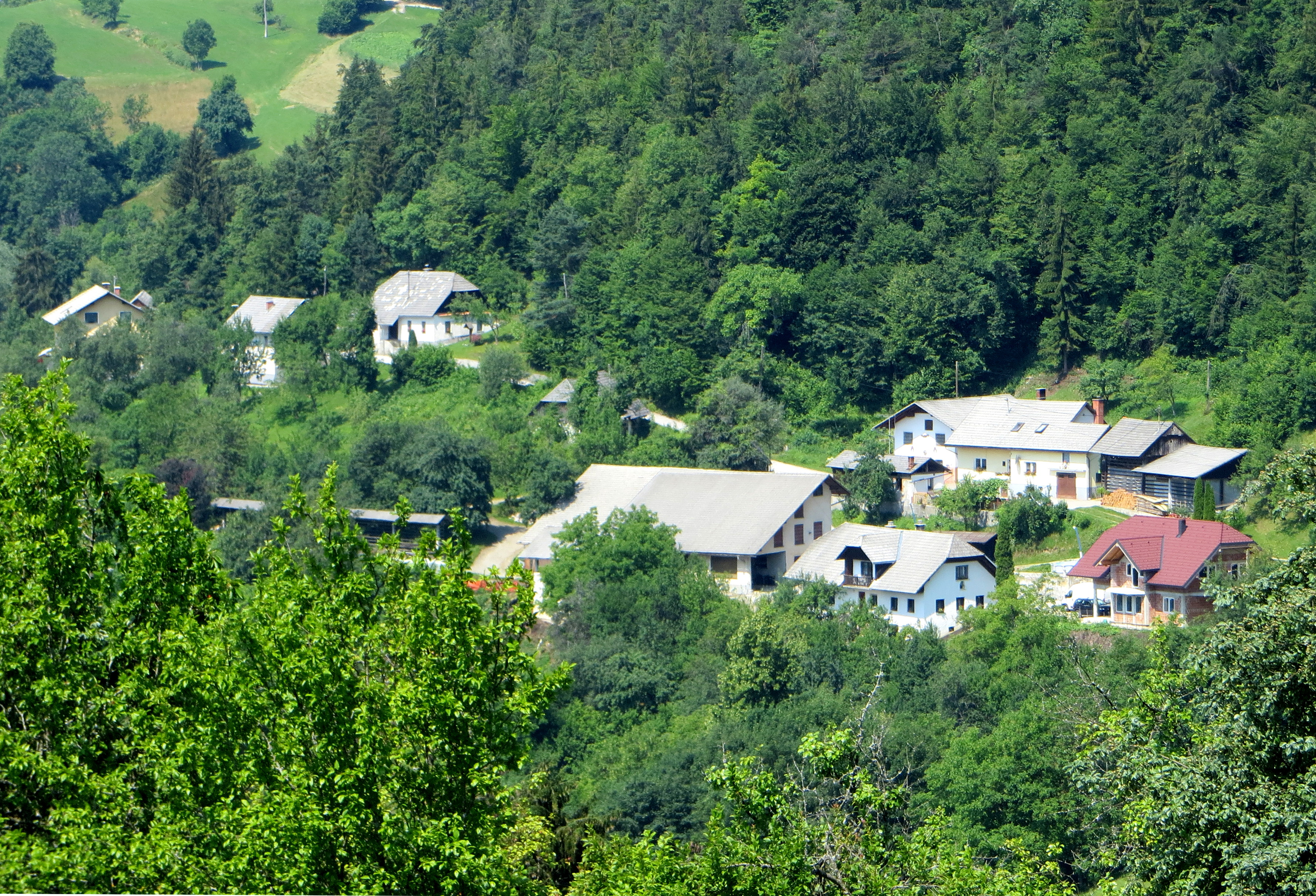

- Location in Slovenia
- Coordinates: 46°11′36.54″N 14°46′4.19″E
- Country: Slovenia
- Traditional region: Upper Carniola
- Statistical region: Central Slovenia
- Municipality: Lukovica

Area
  - Total: 0.56 km^{2} (0.22 sq mi)
- Elevation: 667.7 m (2,191 ft)

Population (2002)
  - Total: 17

Lipa (pronounced [ˈliːpa]) is a small dispersed settlement in the hills north of Krašnja in the Municipality of Lukovica in the eastern part of the Upper Carniola region of Slovenia.
