= Lipovica, Leposavić =

Lipovica Lipovicë
- Village
- Location within Kosovo
- Coordinates: 43.2039°N 20.6203°E
- Location: Kosovo
- District: Mitrovica
- Municipality: Leposavić
- Elevation: 739 m (2,425 ft)
- Time zone: UTC+1 (CET)
  - Summer (DST): UTC+2 (CEST)

Lipovica (Serbian Cyrillic: Липовица, Albanian indefinite form: Lipovicë) is a locality near Bare in the Leposavić municipality in northern Kosovo, at the border with Serbia.

There are several villages named Lipovica in Kosovo and Serbia.
