= Lipová (Prostějov District) =

- Municipality
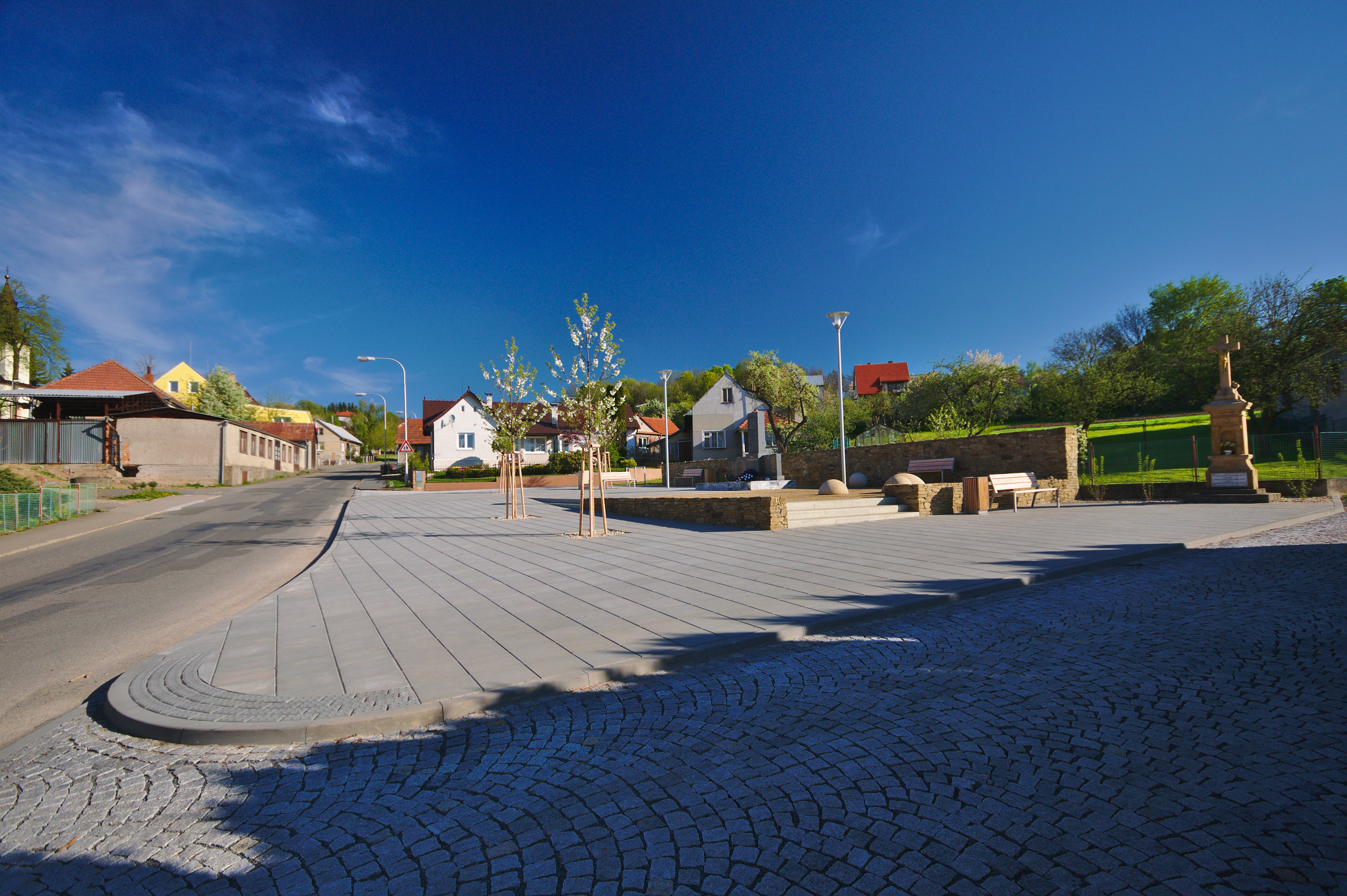
- Centre of Lipová

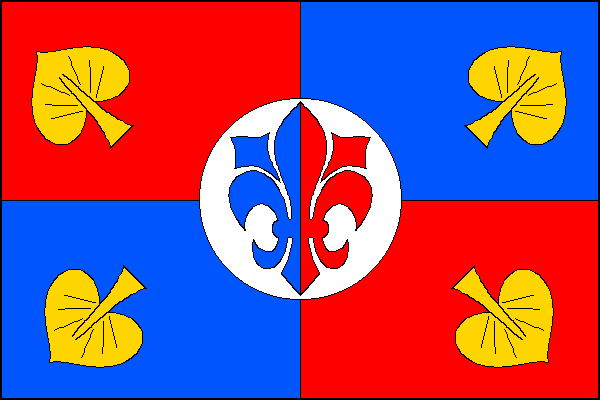
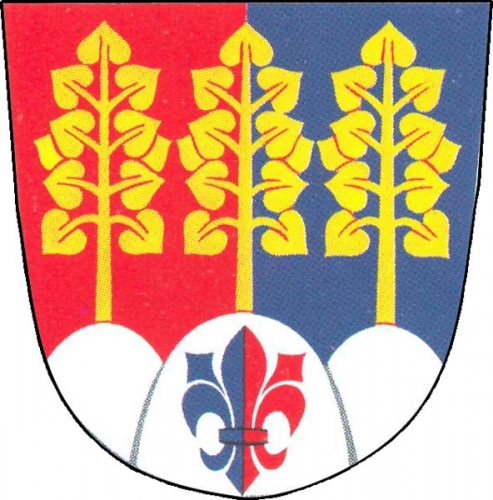
- Flag Coat of arms

- Location in the Czech Republic
- Coordinates: 49°31′34″N 16°51′43″E
- Country: Czech Republic
- Region: Olomouc
- District: Prostějov
- First mentioned: 1379

Area
  - Total: 12.18 km^{2} (4.70 sq mi)
- Elevation: 567 m (1,860 ft)

Population (2026-01-01)
  - Total: 712
  - Density: 58.5/km^{2} (151/sq mi)
- Time zone: UTC+1 (CET)
  - Summer (DST): UTC+2 (CEST)
- Postal code: 798 45
- Website: www.obec-lipova.cz

Lipová is a municipality and village in Prostějov District in the Olomouc Region of the Czech Republic. It has about 700 inhabitants.

== Administrative division ==
Lipová consists of three municipal parts (in brackets population according to the 2021 census):

- Lipová (368)
- Hrochov (197)
- Seč (105)

== Etymology ==
The name Lipová is derived from lipový les, i.e. 'linden forest'.

== Geography ==
Lipová is located about 18 kilometres (11 mi) west of Prostějov and 28 km (17 mi) west of Olomouc. It lies in the Drahany Highlands. The highest point is at 635 m (2,083 ft) above sea level. The Hloučela River flows through the municipality.

== History ==
The first written mention of Lipová is from 1379. Until 1960, Lipová, Hrochov and Seč were three separate municipalities. In 1961, they were merged.

== Demographics ==
Historical population

Year	Pop.	±%
1869	1,293	—
1880	1,420	+9.8%
1890	1,473	+3.7%
1900	1,552	+5.4%
1910	1,507	−2.9%

Year	Pop.	±%
1921	1,470	−2.5%
1930	1,504	+2.3%
1950	1,071	−28.8%
1961	1,126	+5.1%
1970	1,008	−10.5%

Year	Pop.	±%
1980	921	−8.6%
1991	833	−9.6%
2001	778	−6.6%
2011	741	−4.8%
2021	670	−9.6%

Source: Censuses

== Transport ==
There are no railways or major roads passing through the municipality.

== Sights ==
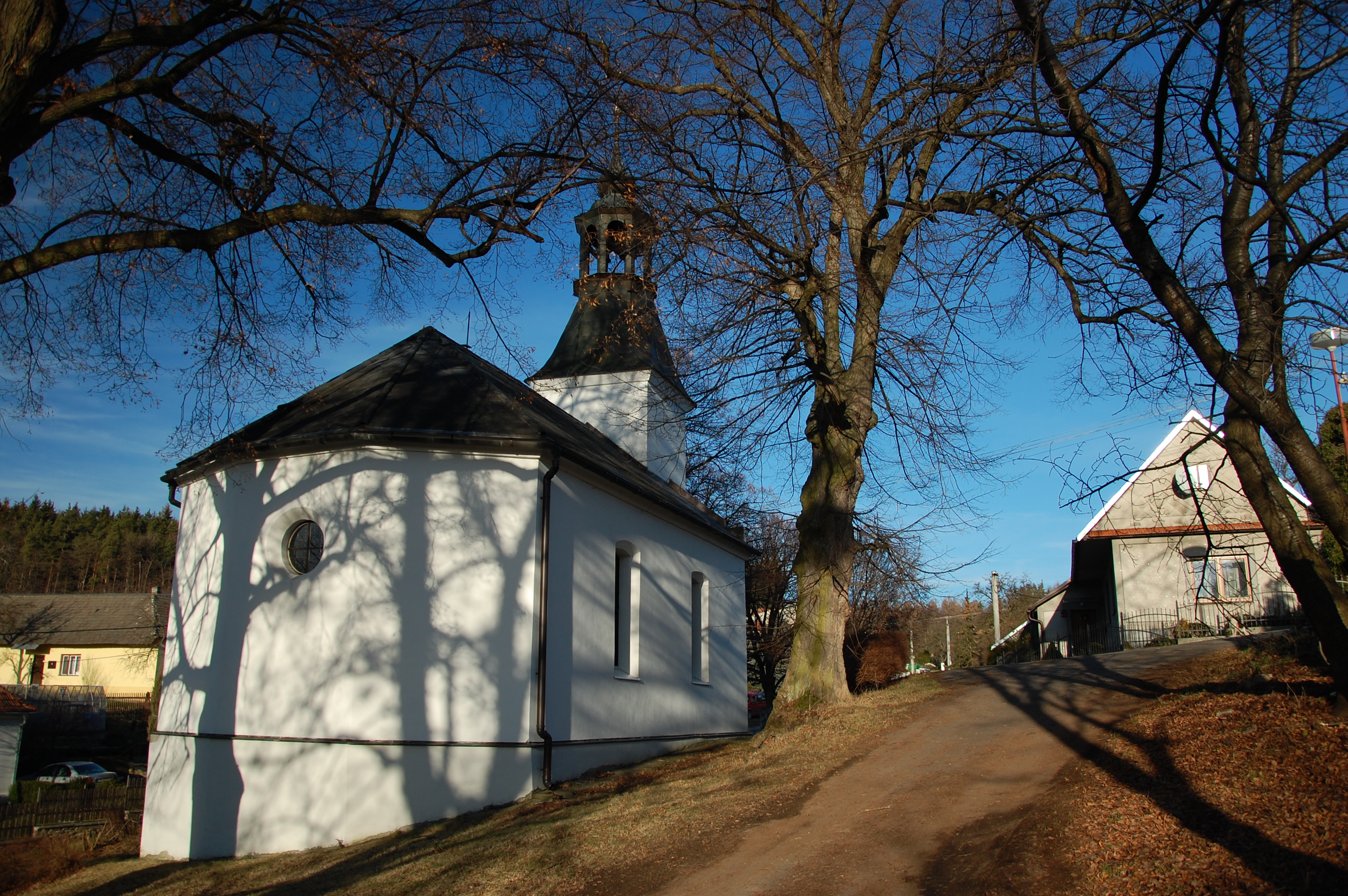
Chapel of Saint Martin

Among the protected cultural monuments in the municipality are the Chapel of Saint Lawrence from the beginning of the 19th century (together with a cross from 1843), located in Hrochov, and the Chapel of Saint Martin (formerly consecrated to St. Florian) from the second half of the 19th century, located in Seč.
