= Lipovica, Lebane =

Lipovica Липовица (Serbian)
- Village
- Location within Serbia
- Coordinates: 42°45′52″N 21°43′48″E
- Country: Serbia
- District: Jablanica District
- Municipality: Lebane

Population (2002)
  - Total: 147
- Time zone: UTC+1 (CET)
  - Summer (DST): UTC+2 (CEST)

Lipovica is a village in the municipality of Lebane, Serbia. According to the 2002 census, the village has a population of 147 people.
