= Řečice (Pelhřimov District) =

- Municipality
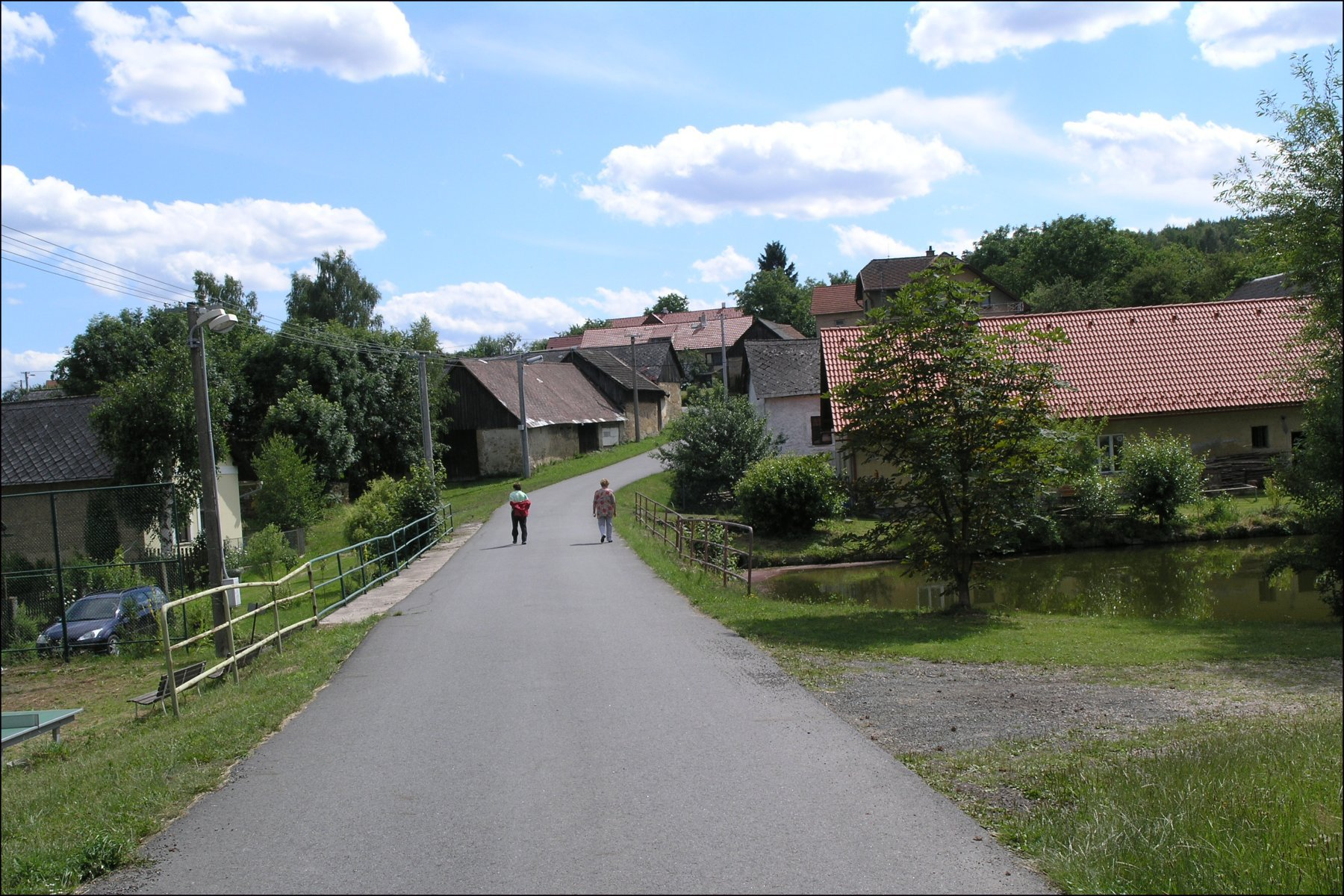
- Main street

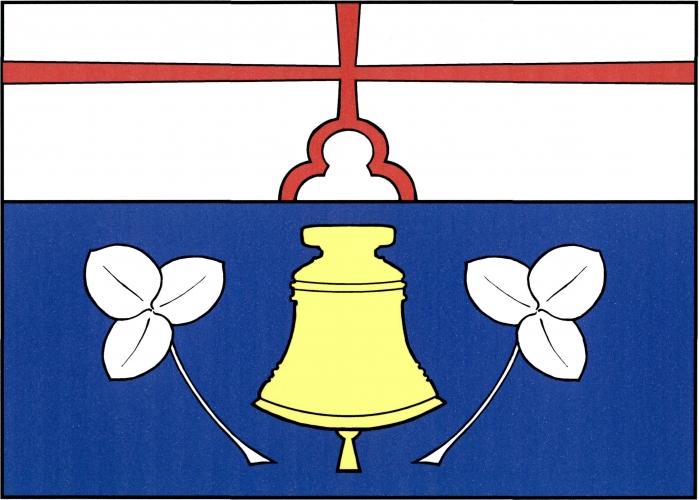
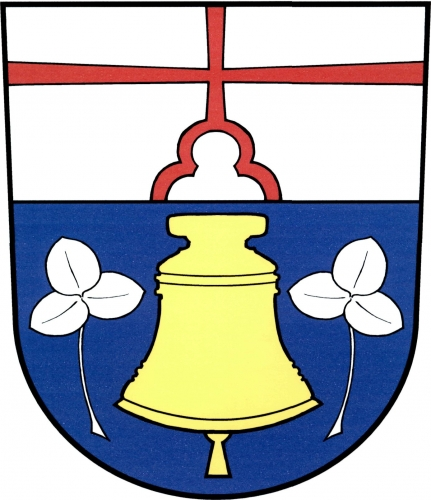
- Flag Coat of arms

- Location in the Czech Republic
- Coordinates: 49°36′11″N 15°22′18″E
- Country: Czech Republic
- Region: Vysočina
- District: Pelhřimov
- First mentioned: 1307

Area
  - Total: 7.76 km^{2} (3.00 sq mi)
- Elevation: 495 m (1,624 ft)

Population (2026-01-01)
  - Total: 158
  - Density: 20.4/km^{2} (52.7/sq mi)
- Time zone: UTC+1 (CET)
  - Summer (DST): UTC+2 (CEST)
- Postal code: 396 01
- Website: www.obec-recice.cz

Řečice is a municipality and village in Pelhřimov District in the Vysočina Region of the Czech Republic. It has about 200 inhabitants.

Řečice lies approximately 22 kilometres (14 mi) north-east of Pelhřimov, 28 km (17 mi) north-west of Jihlava, and 87 km (54 mi) south-east of Prague.

== Administrative division ==
Řečice consists of four municipal parts (in brackets population according to the 2021 census):

- Řečice (30)
- Bystrá (14)
- Křepiny (91)
- Záběhlice (13)

== Demographics ==
Historical population
Year	Pop.	±%
1869	575	—
1880	580	+0.9%
1890	622	+7.2%
1900	691	+11.1%
1910	655	−5.2%
1921	623	−4.9%
1930	557	−10.6%
1950	454	−18.5%
1961	400	−11.9%
1970	291	−27.2%
1980	248	−14.8%
1991	174	−29.8%
2001	143	−17.8%
2011	120	−16.1%
2021	148	+23.3%
Source: Censuses
