= Řečice (Žďár nad Sázavou District) =

- Municipality
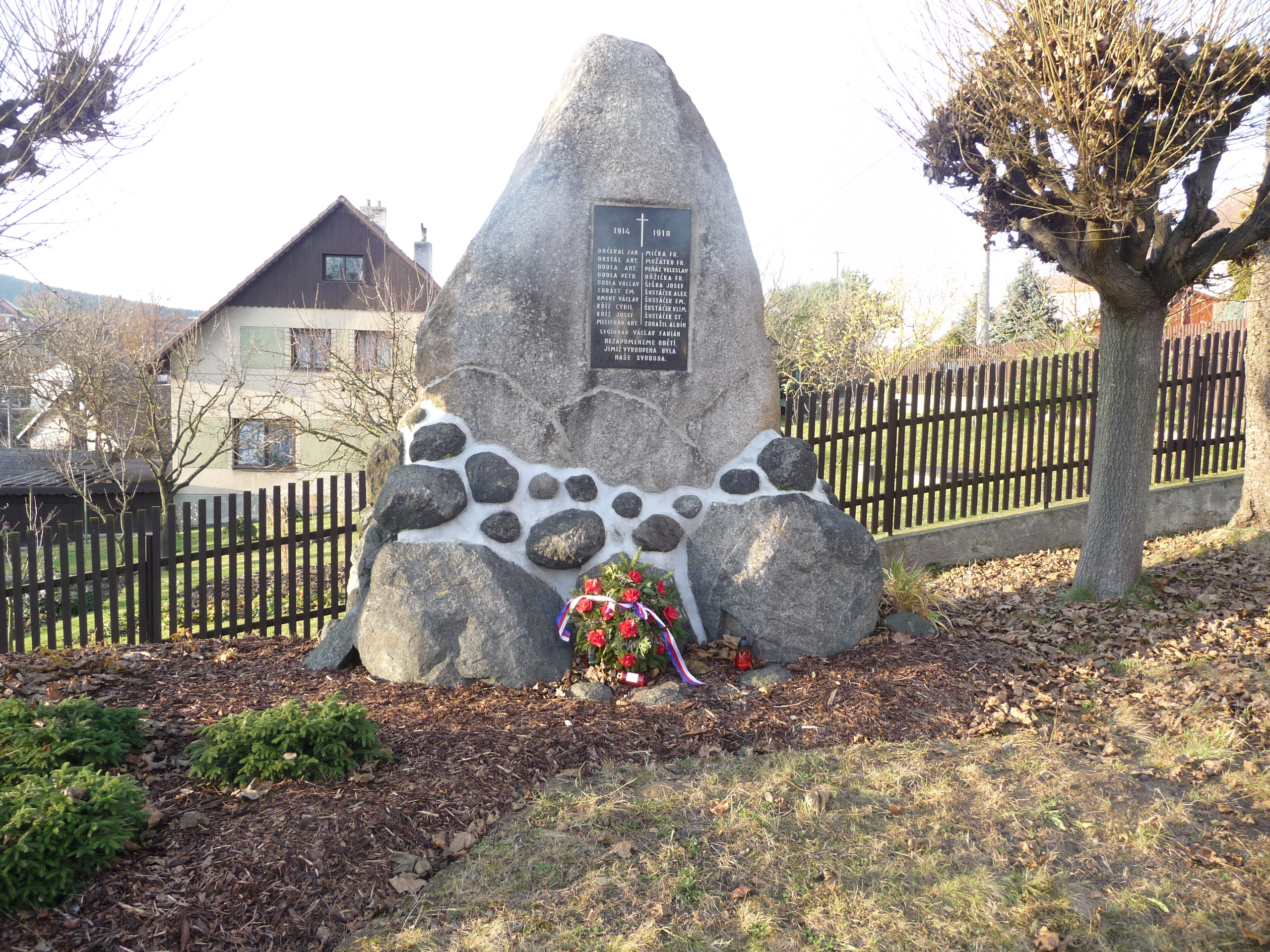
- Memorial to victims of World War I

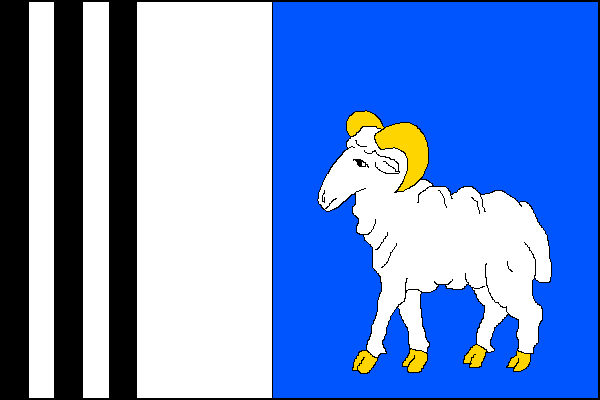
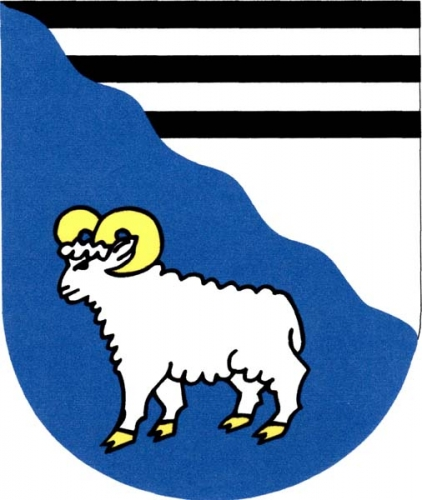
- Flag Coat of arms

- Location in the Czech Republic
- Coordinates: 49°30′47″N 16°3′50″E
- Country: Czech Republic
- Region: Vysočina
- District: Žďár nad Sázavou
- First mentioned: 1366

Area
  - Total: 8.47 km^{2} (3.27 sq mi)
- Elevation: 541 m (1,775 ft)

Population (2026-01-01)
  - Total: 459
  - Density: 54.2/km^{2} (140/sq mi)
- Time zone: UTC+1 (CET)
  - Summer (DST): UTC+2 (CEST)
- Postal code: 592 33
- Website: www.obecrecice.cz

Řečice is a municipality and village in Žďár nad Sázavou District in the Vysočina Region of the Czech Republic. It has about 500 inhabitants.

Řečice lies approximately 11 kilometres (7 mi) south-east of Žďár nad Sázavou, 37 km (23 mi) east of Jihlava, and 134 km (83 mi) south-east of Prague.

== Demographics ==
Historical population
Year	Pop.	±%
1869	649	—
1880	607	−6.5%
1890	647	+6.6%
1900	668	+3.2%
1910	603	−9.7%
1921	613	+1.7%
1930	578	−5.7%
1950	514	−11.1%
1961	520	+1.2%
1970	522	+0.4%
1980	503	−3.6%
1991	459	−8.7%
2001	462	+0.7%
2011	474	+2.6%
2021	454	−4.2%
Source: Censuses
