= Lipovica, Leskovac =

Lipovica Липовица
- Village
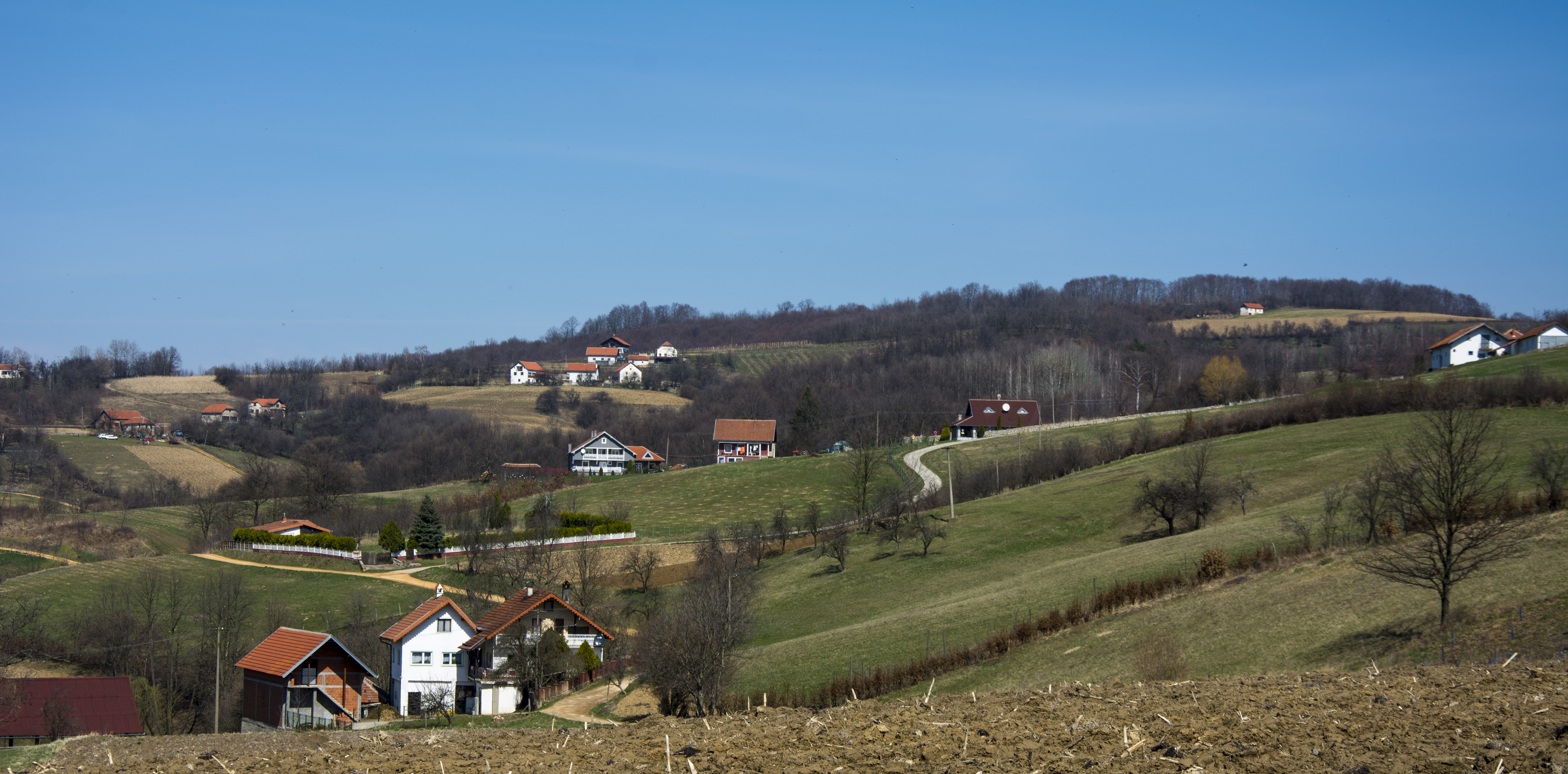
- Lipovica

- Location within Serbia
- Coordinates: 43°08′00″N 21°54′17″E
- Country: Serbia
- District: Jablanica District
- Municipality: Leskovac

Population (2002)
  - Total: 1,287
- Time zone: UTC+1 (CET)
  - Summer (DST): UTC+2 (CEST)

Lipovica is a village in the municipality of Leskovac, Serbia. In 2002, the village has a population of 1287 people.
