= Lipová (Přerov District) =

- Municipality
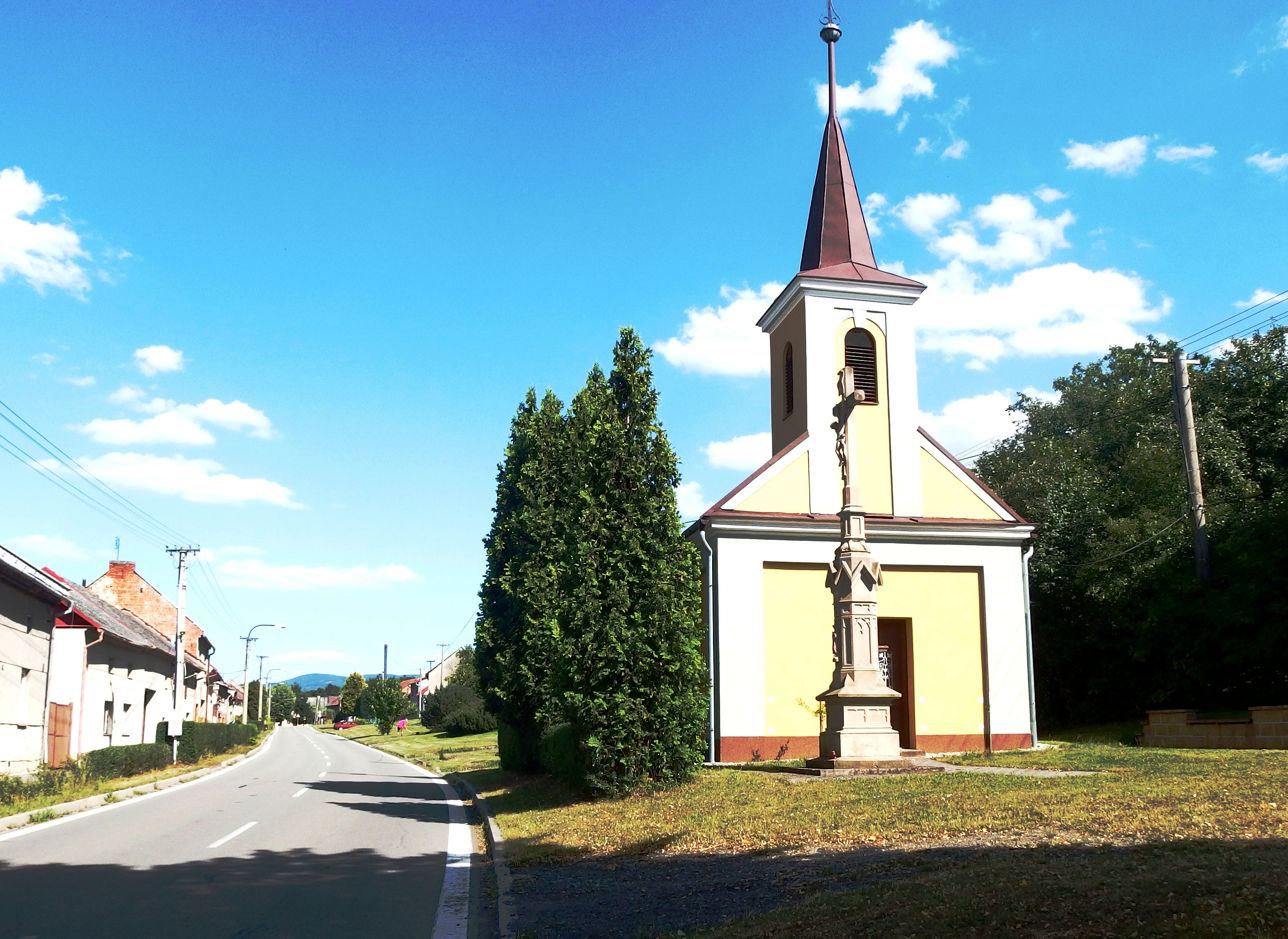
- Chapel of Saints Cyril and Methodius

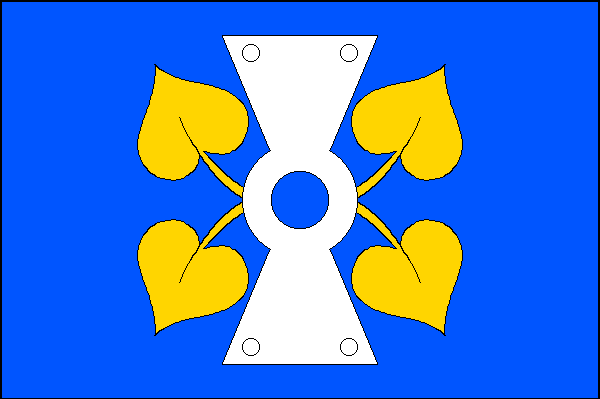
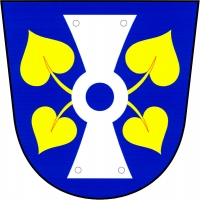
- Flag Coat of arms

- Location in the Czech Republic
- Coordinates: 49°24′35″N 17°36′51″E
- Country: Czech Republic
- Region: Olomouc
- District: Přerov
- First mentioned: 1368

Area
  - Total: 5.01 km^{2} (1.93 sq mi)
- Elevation: 262 m (860 ft)

Population (2026-01-01)
  - Total: 259
  - Density: 51.7/km^{2} (134/sq mi)
- Time zone: UTC+1 (CET)
  - Summer (DST): UTC+2 (CEST)
- Postal code: 751 14
- Website: www.lipovaobec.cz

Lipová is a municipality and village in Přerov District in the Olomouc Region of the Czech Republic. It has about 300 inhabitants.

Lipová lies approximately 13 kilometres (8 mi) east of Přerov, 34 km (21 mi) south-east of Olomouc, and 242 km (150 mi) east of Prague.

== Demographics ==
Historical population
Year	Pop.	±%
1869	376	—
1880	418	+11.2%
1890	434	+3.8%
1900	414	−4.6%
1910	435	+5.1%
1921	483	+11.0%
1930	441	−8.7%
1950	414	−6.1%
1961	428	+3.4%
1970	395	−7.7%
1980	313	−20.8%
1991	273	−12.8%
2001	248	−9.2%
2011	262	+5.6%
2021	261	−0.4%
Source: Censuses
