= Lipovica (peak in Kosovo) =

Mountain in Kosovo

Coordinates: 43.203889°N 20.620278°E

Lipovica (Serbian Cyrillic: Липовица, Albanian: Lipovicë) is a peak in Kosovo.

Lipovica reaches a top height of 1,000 m (3,281 ft).
