= Lipa, Jawor County =

Lipa
- Village
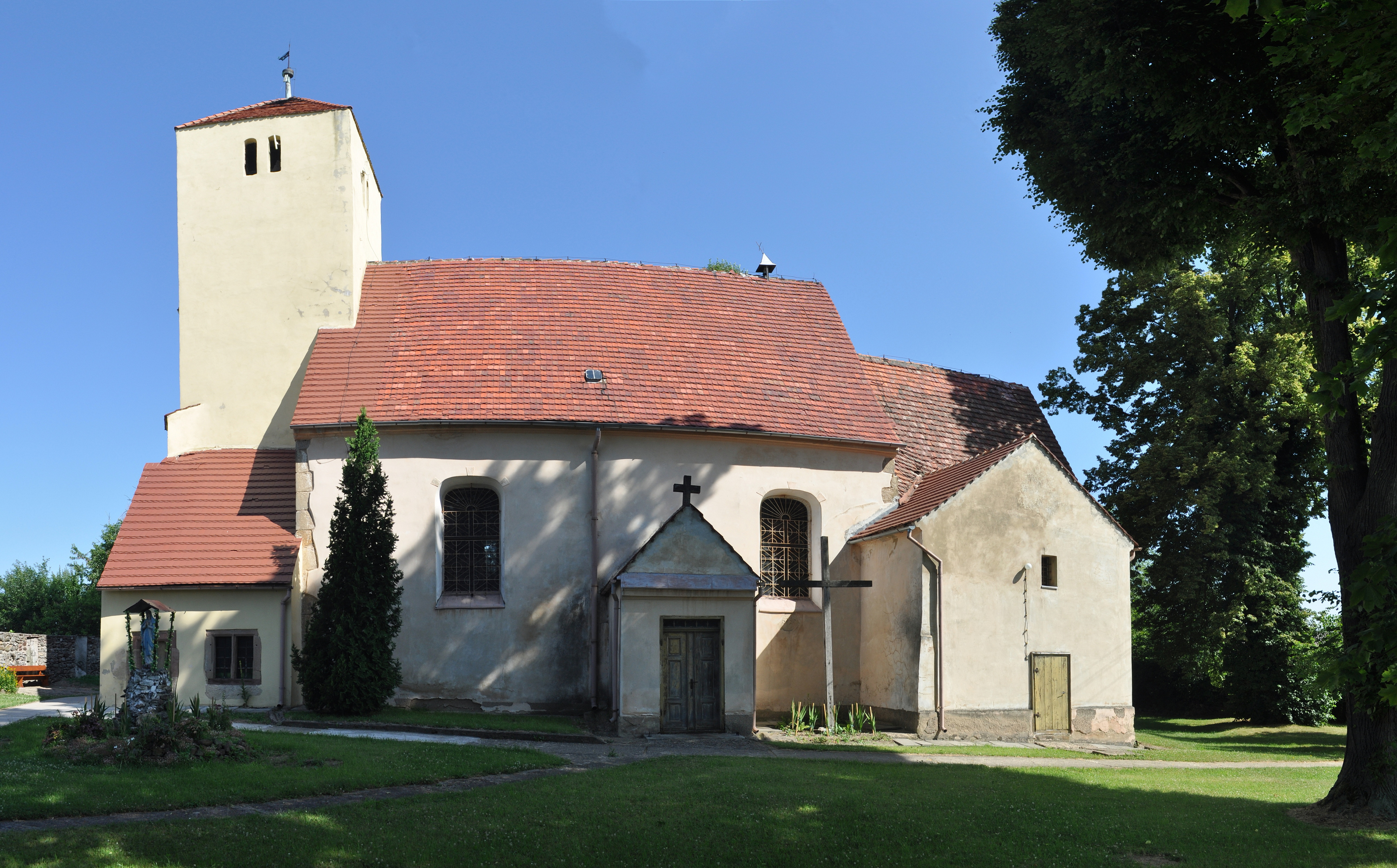
- Church in Lipa

- Location within Poland
- Coordinates: 50°58′00″N 16°2′0″E
- Country: Poland
- Voivodeship: Lower Silesian
- County: Jawor
- Gmina: Bolków
- Population: 677

Lipa [ˈlipa] is a village in the administrative district of Gmina Bolków, within Jawor County, Lower Silesian Voivodeship, in south-western Poland. .

== Gallery ==
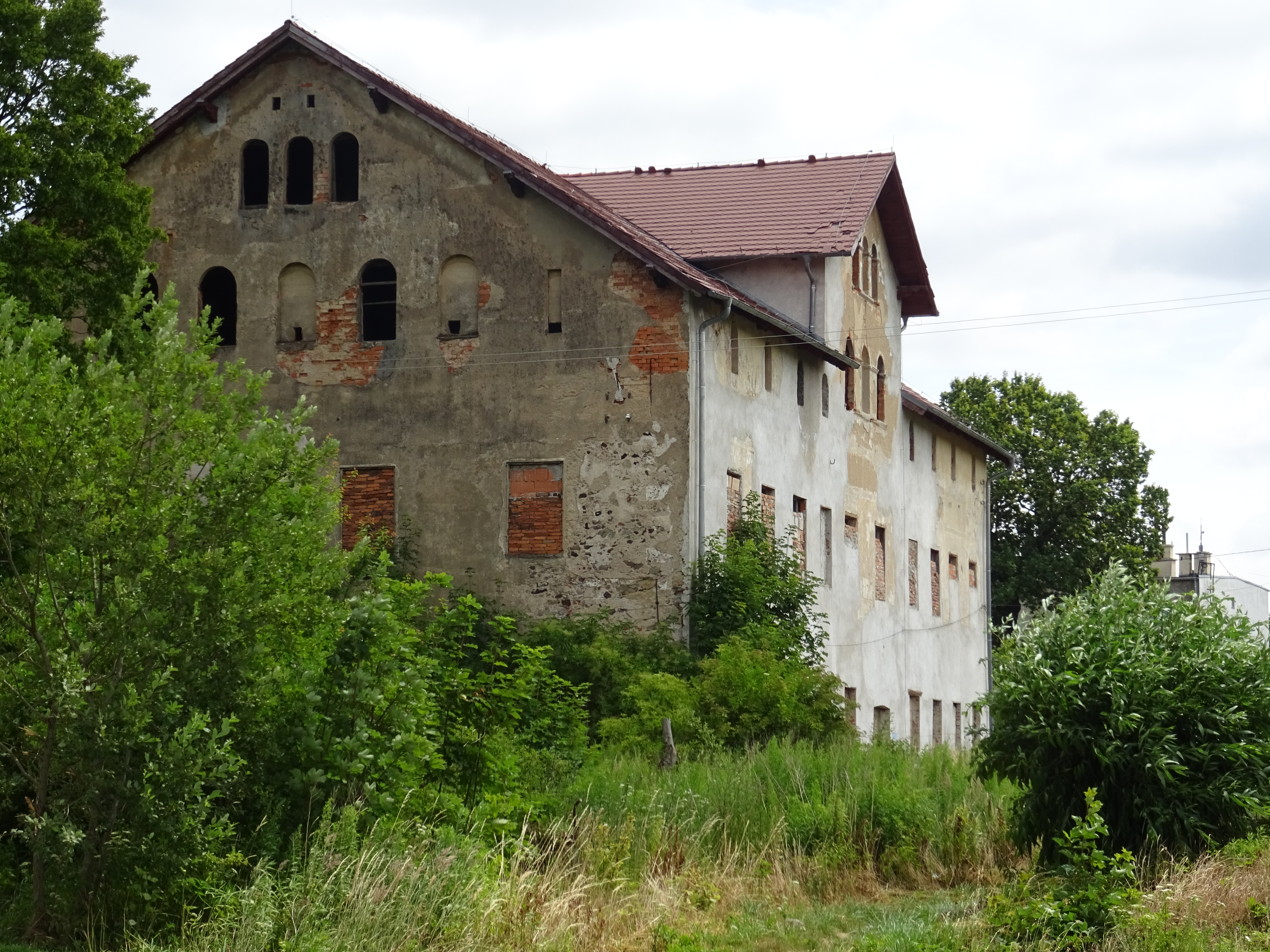
Abandoned palace

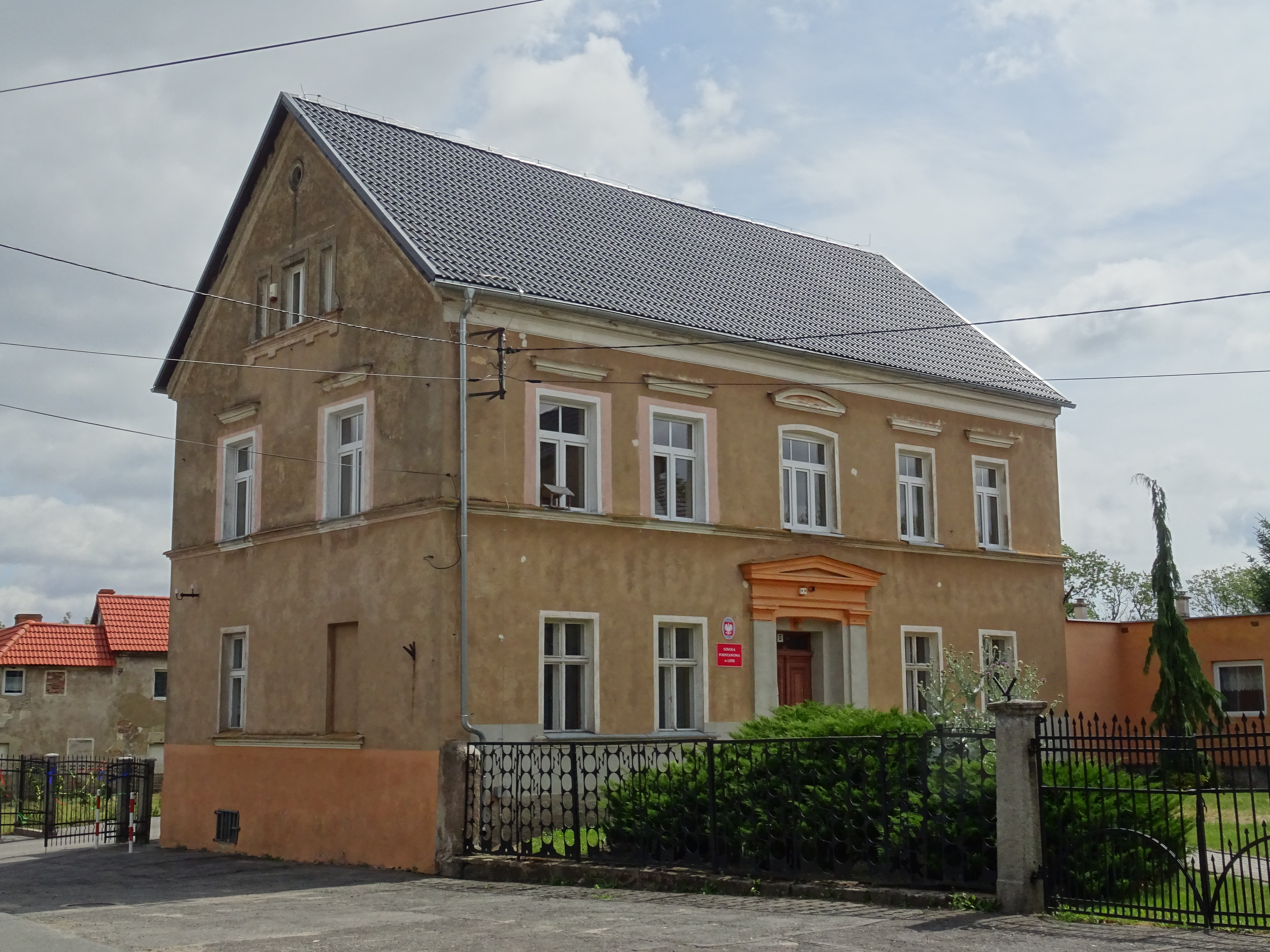
Elementary school

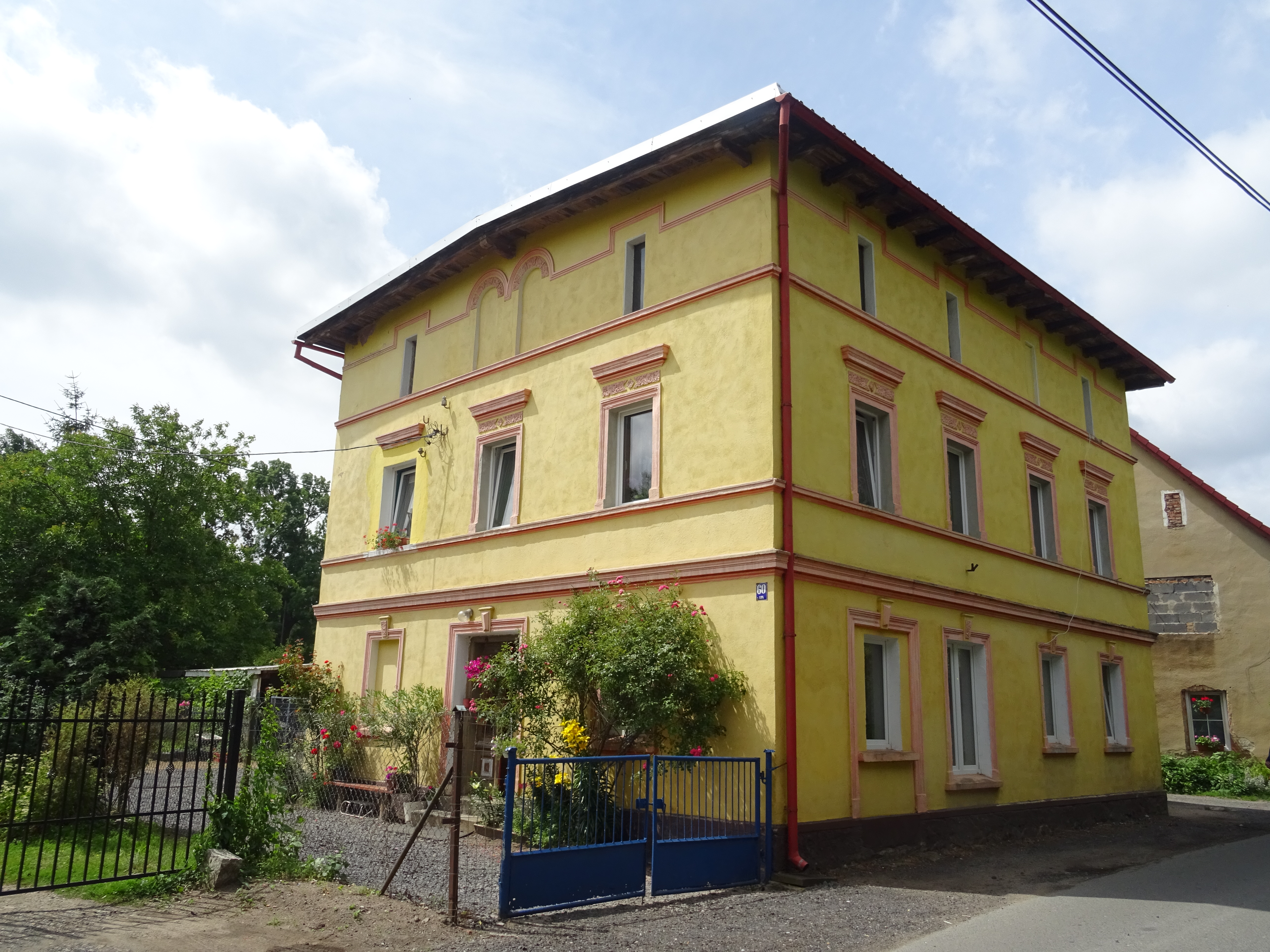
House

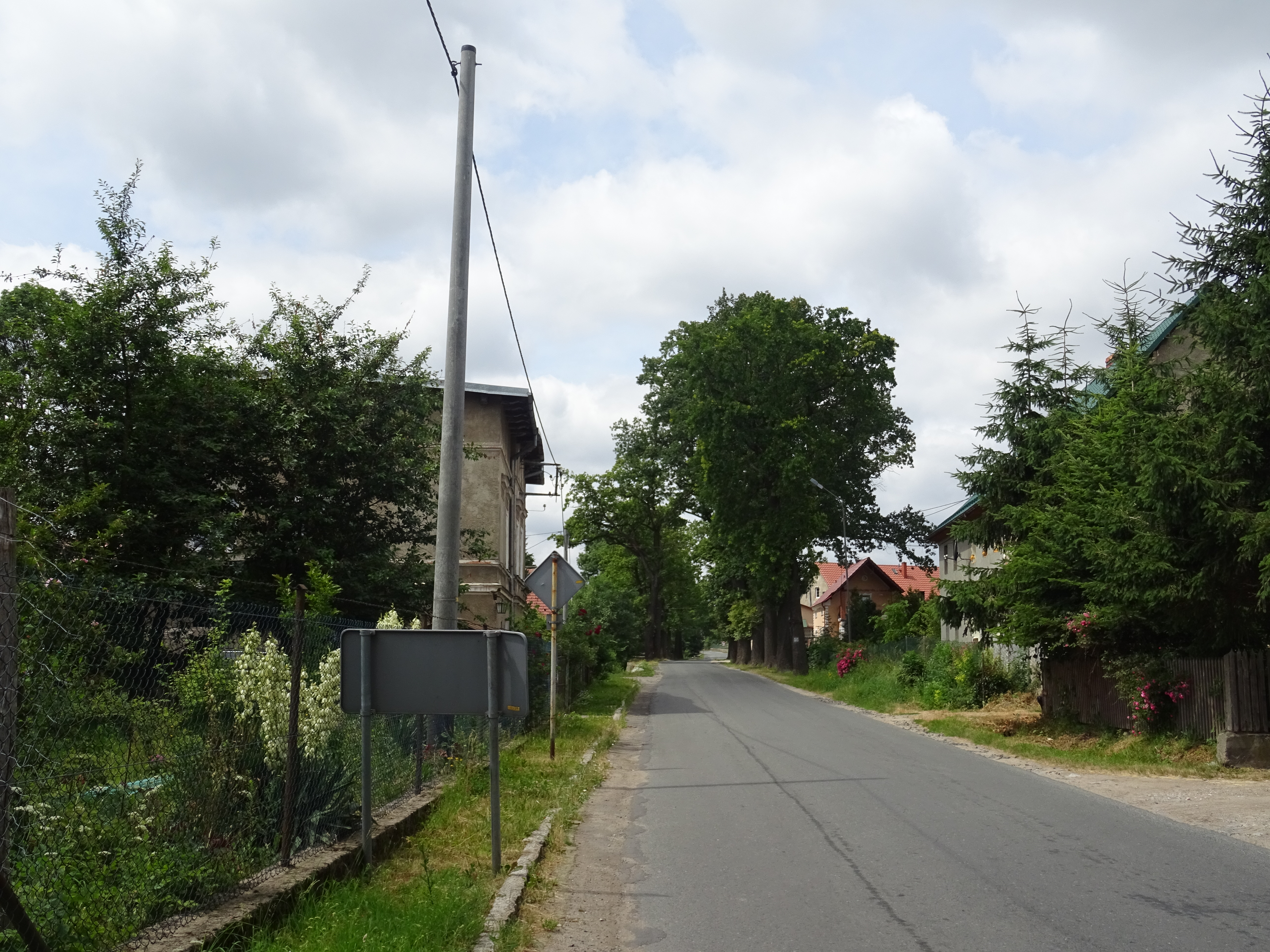
Street
