= Volfířov =

- Municipality
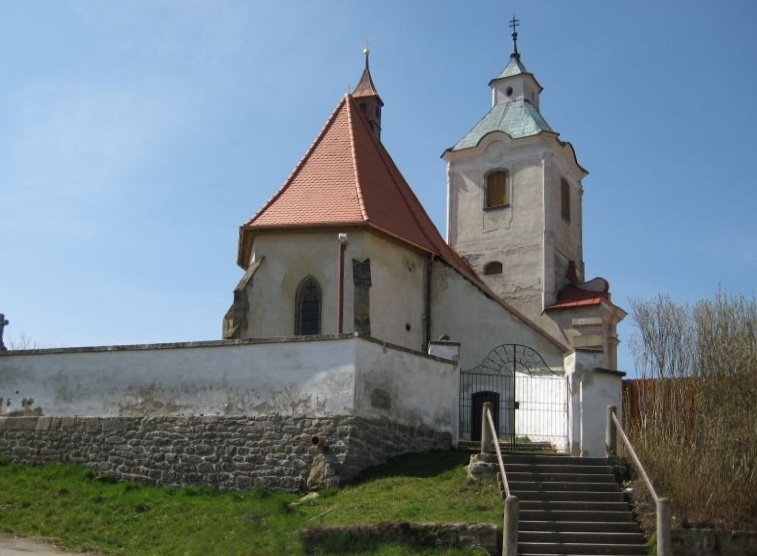
- Church of Saints Peter and Paul

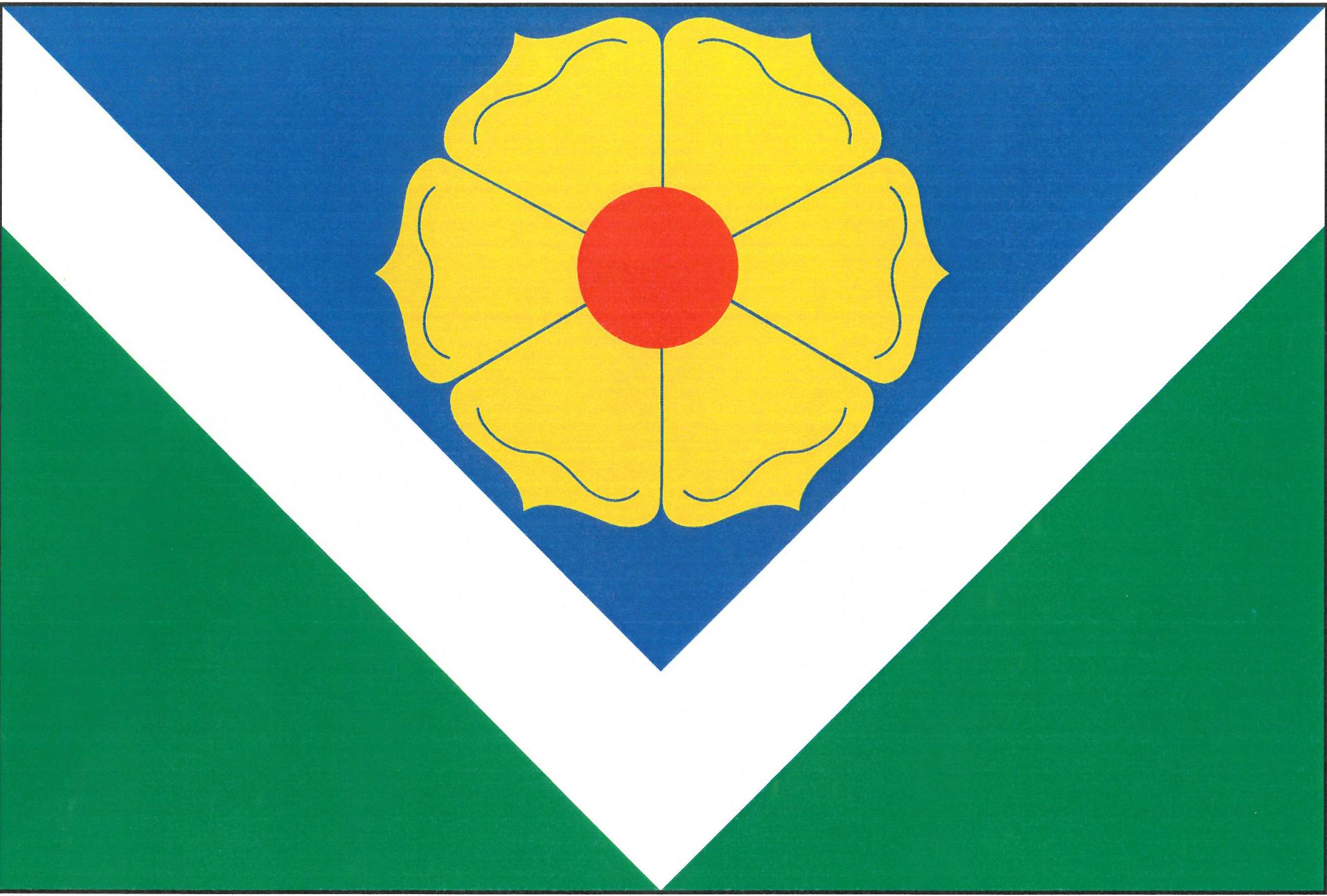
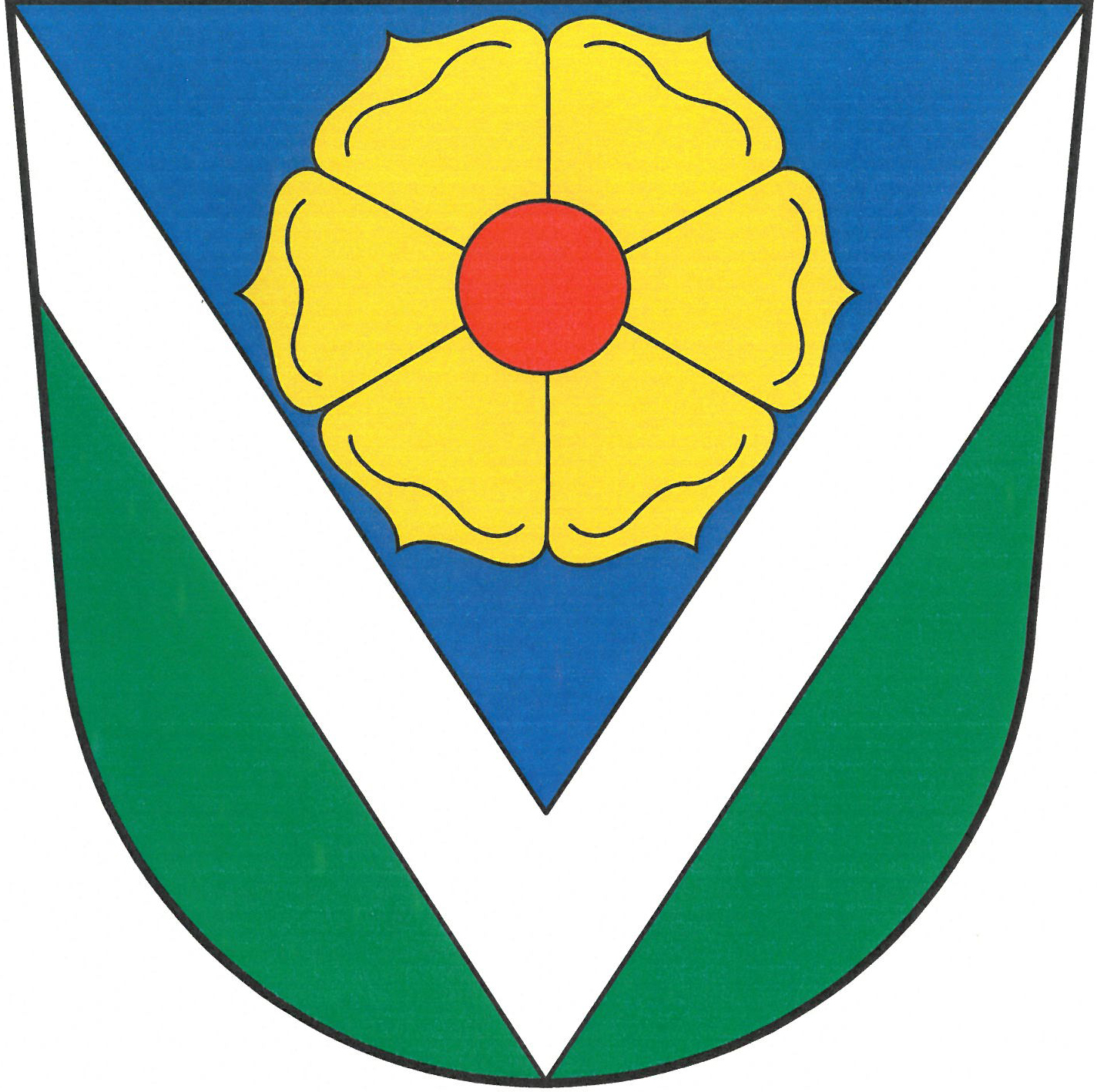
- Flag Coat of arms

- Location in the Czech Republic
- Coordinates: 49°6′25″N 15°22′13″E
- Country: Czech Republic
- Region: South Bohemian
- District: Jindřichův Hradec
- First mentioned: 1349

Area
  - Total: 32.81 km^{2} (12.67 sq mi)
- Elevation: 498 m (1,634 ft)

Population (2026-01-01)
  - Total: 736
  - Density: 22.4/km^{2} (58.1/sq mi)
- Time zone: UTC+1 (CET)
  - Summer (DST): UTC+2 (CEST)
- Postal code: 380 01
- Website: www.volfirov.cz

Volfířov is a municipality and village in Jindřichův Hradec District in the South Bohemian Region of the Czech Republic. It has about 700 inhabitants.

Volfířov lies approximately 27 kilometres (17 mi) east of Jindřichův Hradec, 67 km (42 mi) east of České Budějovice, and 129 km (80 mi) south-east of Prague.

== Administrative division ==
Volfířov consists of eight municipal parts (in brackets population according to the 2021 census):

- Volfířov (270)
- Brandlín (79)
- Lipová (2)
- Poldovka (2)
- Radlice (41)
- Řečice (138)
- Šach (19)
- Velká Lhota (145)

== Demographics ==
Historical population
Year	Pop.	±%
1869	2,091	—
1880	2,040	−2.4%
1890	2,066	+1.3%
1900	1,991	−3.6%
1910	1,936	−2.8%
1921	1,887	−2.5%
1930	1,685	−10.7%
1950	1,264	−25.0%
1961	1,197	−5.3%
1970	951	−20.6%
1980	838	−11.9%
1991	715	−14.7%
2001	677	−5.3%
2011	674	−0.4%
2021	696	+3.3%
Source: Censuses
