= Vlashnjë =

Vlashnjë: Vlashnjë (Albanian); Влашња/Vlašnja (Serbian)
- Village
- Location in Kosovo
- Coordinates: 42°12′09″N 20°39′45″E
- Location: Kosovo
- District: Prizren
- Municipality: Prizren

Population (2024)
  - Total: 1,322
- Time zone: UTC+1 (CET)
  - Summer (DST): UTC+2 (CEST)

Vlashnjë (pronounced [vlaʃɲə]; Albanian definite form: Vlashnja) is a village in the Prizren, Kosovo. It has 1,322 inhabitants as of 2024. Vlashnjë is a multi-layered settlement and site area. Archaeological excavations have identified habitation and use of the area since the Neolithic era. The rock art paintings at Mrrizi i Kobajës (late Neolithic-early Bronze Age) are the first find of prehistoric rock art in Kosovo. In late antiquity, Vlashnja was a fortified settlement part of the fortification network which Justinian I rebuilt along the White Drin in Dardania.

== History ==
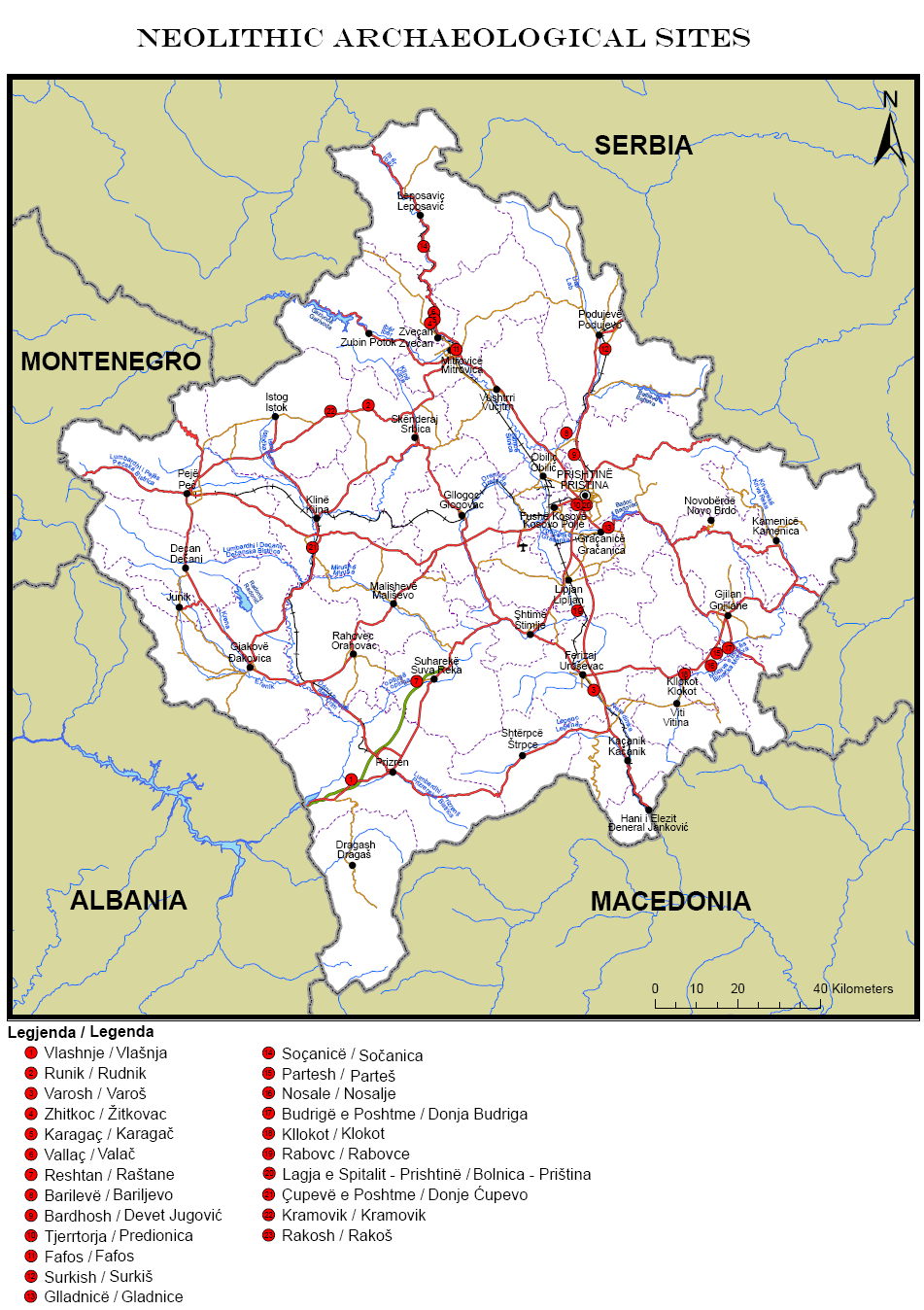
Map of Neolithic sites in Kosovo

The settlement of Vlashnjë is located on the flat plateau of a raised rocky terrace 335 metres (1,099 ft) above sea level, on the Pristina-Zhur road about 6 kilometres (3.7 mi) west of Prizren. The toponym itself may refer to a nearby locality which was used at some point as grazing land by pastoral Vlachs. The site contains material from a number of periods, from the early Starčevo (early Neolithic) and Vinča cultures through the Copper, Bronze and Iron Ages to the Hellenistic, Late Antiquity and the Early Middle Ages. Archaeological evidence excavated at the site include clay pottery and vessel fragments, stone and bone tools, decorative and utilitarian artifacts and coins. They are comparable to material found at the nearby Prizren Fortress (~10 km to the east of Vlashnjë). Excavations took place in 2002, 2006-2008 and 2010 as part of a joint archaeological project of the universities of Tirana and Pristina. They covered a total area of 816 m².

The rock art of Mrrizi i Kobajës

In the 2005 expedition, archaeologist Edi Shukriu discovered a series of rock paintings at the location Mrrizi i Kobajës (1.5 km to the west of the present-day location of the village) on a hill which overlooks the Lumbardhi river. The open rock art has been painted on limestone with red paint - a mixture of animal blood and wax or ochre. Its dating is unclear as Vlashnja has many sites from different eras, but it is broadly specified between the late Neolithic (ca. 3600 BCE) and the early Bronze Age (ca. 2000 BCE) in the Balkans. There are two roof and two horizontal (wall) paintings. The roof paintings depict ten spirals of clockwise and counterclockwise direction. The wall paintings depict spirals, of which some have faded, and a deer. The open rock art of Vlashnja is the first find of prehistoric rock art to be found in the region. The spirals symbolize the sun and the cycle of life and death and the location was a ritual site. The spiral is found in later depictions in the region of Kosovo, in Neolithic pottery and Iron Age jewelry. In Dardania, the spiral as a symbol of a sun deity developed in the local sun cult of Dea Dardanica by the Roman era. The deer as a symbol is depicted in other sites of rock art in the western Balkans like Tren in the Korça region in Albania and Lipci rock art in the Bay of Kotor in Montenegro, albeit in a different context - as hunted by male horse-riding spearmen. It also appears as part of later Illyrian art in the region.

During Late Antiquity, the settlement was fortified with walls typical of the reconstruction of forts in the era of eastern Roman Emperor Justinian I as part of the defensive fortifications along the White Drin in late Dardania. The late antiquity fortifications are comparable to the material found in excavations at the site of the Prizren fortress and other settlements of the Prizren area (Karashëngjegj, Korishë, Vraniq). The fortified area, covering about 2 hectares (4.9 acres), was probably used to observe the Via Lissus-Naissus (which bypassed the settlement). Archaeological finds indicate that it developed at the same site as an earlier non-fortified settlement in the 3rd to 2nd century BCE in the period of the Kingdom of Dardania. Pottery fragments painted with geometric lines, a Starčevo flint knife, and anthropomorphic and zoomorphic figurines from the sixth millennium BC have been unearthed. A decorated baked-clay pot typical of the Vinča culture (third millennium BC), Bronze Age baked-clay table vessels and a 3.72-gram coin dating to 55 BC have also been found at the site. To the north of the site stand the ruins of a medieval church. The patron saint of the church was St. Nicholas after whom to this day the locality is named (Shën Koll).

== Demographics ==
As of 2024, Vlashnjë had a population of 1,322. All of the inhabitants were Albanians.

Demographics
Year	Population
1948	205
1953	241
1961	303
1971	446
1981	675
1991	906
2011	1,700
2024	1,322

== Sources ==
- Berisha, Milot (2012). Archaeological Guide of Kosovo. Archaeological Institute of Kosovo.
- Hoxha, Gëzim (2007). "Të dhëna të reja arkeologjike nga Kalaja e Prizrenit / Nouvelles données archéologiques sur la forteresse de Prizren". Iliria. 33. doi:10.3406/iliri.2007.1073.
- Përzhita, Luan; Peja, Fatmir (2005). "Mbi disa tipare të zhvillimit kulturor në Dardaninë Perëndimore (shek. I-IV) / Some Aspects of the Cultural Development of Western Dardania (1st-4th Century)". Iliria. 32. doi:10.3406/iliri.2005.1121.
- Shpuza, Saimir (2009). "Kronikë e gërmimeve 2009-2010". Iliria. 34. doi:10.3406/iliri.2009.1094.
- Shukriu, Edi (1977). "Kërkimet arkeologjike përgjatë rrjedhës së poshtme të Drinit të Bardhë / Recherches archéologiques le long du cours ultérieur de Drini i Bardhë". Iliria. 7–8. doi:10.3406/iliri.1977.1281.
- Shukriu, Edi (2006). "Spirals of the prehistoric open rock painting from Kosova". Proceedings of the XV World Congress of the International Union for Prehistoric and Protohistoric Sciences. 35.
