= Archaeology of Ferizaj =

Kosovo has a rich heritage in archaeology, however the field suffers from a lack of substantial institutional research. Since prehistory, the advantageous geostrategic position and abundant natural resources of the area have been suitable for the emergence of life. This is shown by the traces of hundreds of archaeological sites discovered throughout the country, displaying the abundant archaeological legacy.

The entire archaeological activity of Kosovo begins after the establishment of the Museum of Kosovo in 1949. By the end of the nineteenth century, the first scientific data on the archaeological heritage had been published, because of the efforts of researchers A. Evans and F. Kanitz. Since then, the research on the archaeology of Kosovo has been included in the Encyclopedia of Global Archaeology.

It is suggested by many international archaeologists, that the Municipality of Ferizaj is to be counted as one among the locations that have high-value archeological assets.

== The Sarcophagus Lid of Nikadin ==
Coordinates: 42.357°N 21.169°E

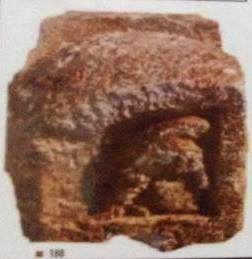
Side view of the Sarcophagus Lid - Nikadin.

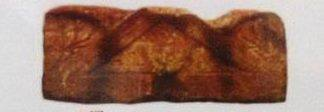
Frontal view of the Sarcophagus Lid - Nikadin.

Three archaeologists, an architect and a draftsman, from the research in the backyard of Xhelal Berisha, in Nikadin village not far from the center of Ferizaj, have managed to finish the tracking of the foundations of a church, which is believed to be from the Paleochristian era of the 5th and 6th centuries AD. From the research, it was discovered that The Sarcophagus Lid brickyard in the foundations of the church below the floor. The Archaeological Institute of Kosovo have declared that "The Sarcophagus Lid", is evaluated as a pagan element and as such, as disrespectful act of the Christians, they bricked in the floor of the church. Many Albanian archaeologists have estimated as a big wealth finding the foundations of the Paleochristian churches. Also, while tracking have found bricks and tiling of the Roman time. Although, Ferizaj is a new city (130 years old) compared to other cities of the country, it goes back through the centuries as an Illyrian settlement. This is recorded in archaeological maps of many countries of the world.

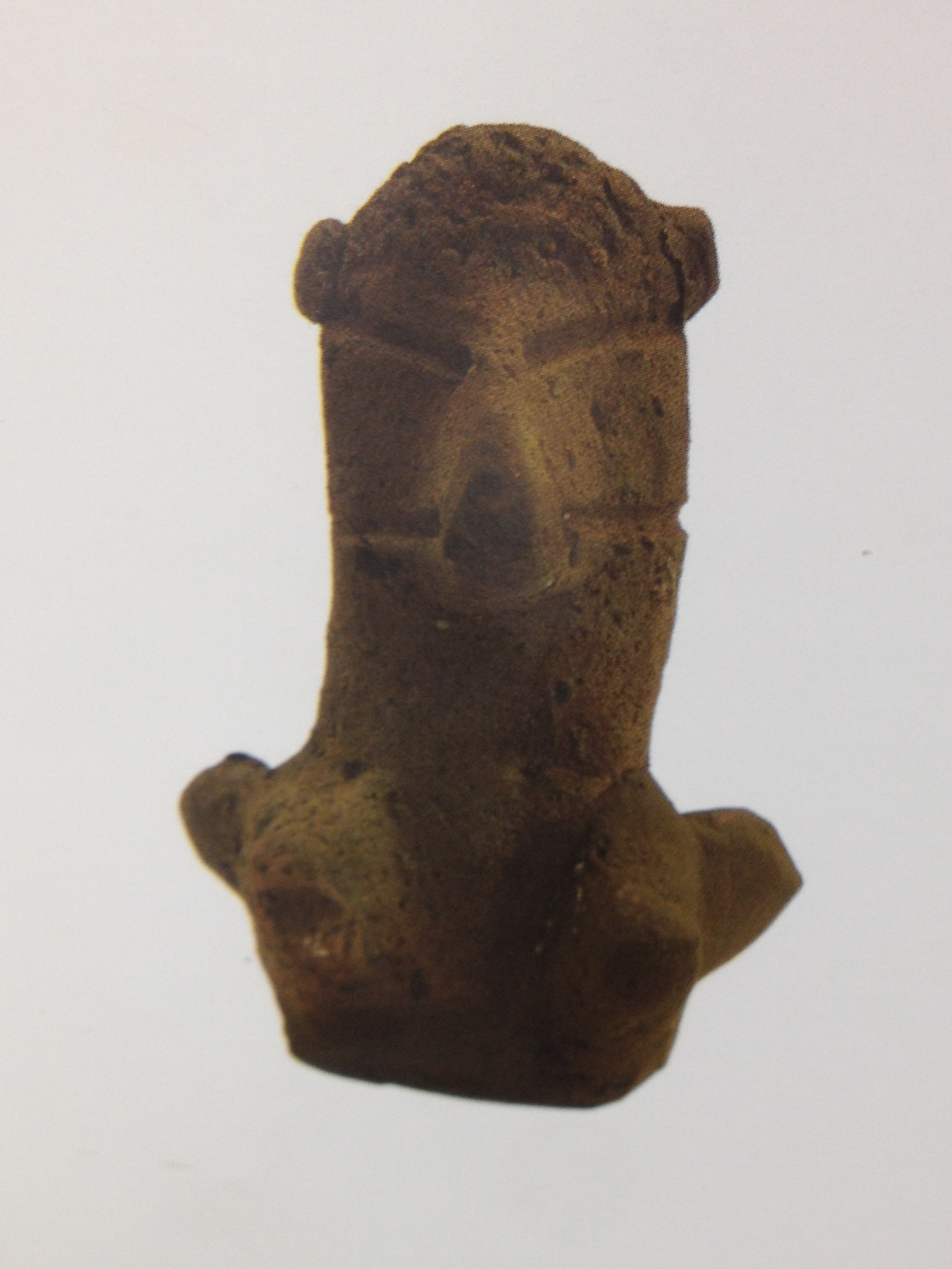
Terracotta Early Neolithic, Runik Culture (7th - 6th millennium B.C.) Clay Length: 5.5 cm Found in: Varosh - Ferizaj Museum of Kosovo Surface finding

== The Divinity of Varosh ==
Coordinates: 42.341°N 21.175°E

The identified Neolithic site of Varosh is located 2 km (1 mi) south-east the city, in Varosh village. Occasional fragments of Neolithic ceramics were found during field work and described in records. The majority of the revealed archaeology materials indicate traces of a nucleated Neolithic settlement of Starcevo and Vinca cultures. In some parcels of this archaeological site during 2011, magnetometer surveys detected several underground structures, possibly remains of Neolithic houses. In Varosh, urns were found 500m from the remains of a church, since 1967 they are hosted in the Museum of Kosovo. It is believed that a Roman-Illyrian settlement was there. The site was actively explored since 1984, where history professor, Ymer Berisha had found a carved stone underground.

== Locality of Zllatar ==
Coordinates: 42.399°N 21.287°E

The result of Map Archaeological Project and in particular the cooperation of German and Kosovar Institute, an ancient locality in the Ferizaj municipality was discovered in 2008. The locality is situated in the Zllatar village in the north-east of Ferizaj, where today lies part of the American base "Bondsteel". By archaeological Map of Kosovo, in 2008 is said that in this village is a prehistoric settlement which belongs to the Neolithic period. "Hopefully, at some flint artifacts, we also have indications Mesolithic a period that is very rare and controversial". In this area approximately 2 km (1 mi), were found in prehistoric times as flint and stone tools of ancient period. In 2008, in collaboration with the Archaeological Institute of Frankfurt, Kosovo archaeologists have recorded a surface field 70, where the result is obtained a view more graphics-magnetic anomalies and oval structures which result in a settlement of the Neolithic period all infrastructure such are; huts housing, worker, etc. During this year on March began with some excavation it was identified purpose of the space, location and explanation of elements such as extension spatial extent of the settlement, determining chronological continuity of time, the status of this residence, level development and relations with the settlements of this period, adding mobile archaeological material discovered in excavations, undertaken surveys came to light trace a residential or temporary residence in the continuation of that prehistoric which continued to be active during the Middle Ages. A valuable place among the findings of ceramics voice. From the standpoint of technique should be noted ceramic paper work typical of the Neolithic period in the region. Pottery discovered here is very fragmented and very damaged and mostly belongs to the prehistoric (Neolithic, Eneolithic) while not neglecting the fact fragmentary findings belonging to other periods as bronze, iron, and in some cases ancient and early Middle Ages.

== The Mountain Church in Komogllava ==
Coordinates: 42.661°N 20.266°E

Based on the findings and existing trace in many parts of the village and archaeological discoveries casually made it appears that Komogllava is very old urbanized resident, with water supply and with all other antique objects of a city. Komogllava is the place in which they stand on the surface trace of the ancient Illyrian-Dardan, toponym Mountain Church, which was passed from generation to generation, there was only a starting point for exploring in the area for traces of the distant past, while fragments from remote times, had already begun to reveal the earth. The foundations of this church are unfolding day by day with them the other fragments that document the existence of life in this country. In this locality were found Vase, from ceramic pots, coins, jewellery, items of iron and other carbonaceous substances, but also the characteristic stone, believed to have moved from coastal areas to build the sarcophagus and other items objects of strong high. Unfortunately, few of these objects are preserved today. The elderly of this country have shown that many incidentally or intentionally traveler, had passed there, and of children in exchange for a toy they received finding artifacts that had sprouted during tillage land, opening the foundations of houses or wells. It is believed that the church should meet 1st century BC, but was rebuilt in the medieval period at the time of the Byzantine Empire. Locality is an ancient urbanized streets, sewage and other infrastructure. Potters found here less resembles those found in other places, but has an analogy between fragments. Potter believe belongs Dardanian period, then the sewage pipes are very interesting, but also has material that is interesting conceive each and worth studying, indicating that Komogllava is among the few countries that has a water supply system of this period, which even today is derived, but it is not known water source.

== Bibliography ==
- Varoshi-Yesterday, Today and Tomorrow (monography)-Xhevdet Shabani, Ferizaj 2013, pg.28
- Komogllava was strong and remained from Rrahim Qazimi and Feriz Ilazi, Ferizaj, April 2009, pg.5, 6
- Dardania preurban - Kosovo Archaeological Studies from Edi Shukriu, Peje, 1996
- Archaeological Guide of Kosovo pg. 23
- Kosova Archaeologica, Pristina, 2006
- Museum of Kosovo - Archaeological Institute of Kosovo Archaeological Catalogue of Kosovo, page 18, 194 Pristina, 2013
