= Pestova =

Pestova may refer to:

- Pestova (surname), a Slavic feminine surname
- Pestova (archaeological site), a site in Kosovo
- Pestova, Kosovo, a village near Vushtrri
