= Vërban =

Village in Viti, Kosovo

Vërban: Vërban (Albanian); Врбан/Vrban (Serbian)
- Village
- Location within Kosovo
- Coordinates: 42.300954°N 21.278623°E
- Country: Kosovo
- District: Gjilan
- Municipality: Viti
- Elevation: 630 m (2,070 ft)

Population (2024)
  - Total: 1,549
- Time zone: UTC+1 (CET)
  - Summer (DST): UTC+2 (CEST)

Vërban (Albanian: Vërban; Serbian Cyrillic: Врбан/Vrban) is a village in the municipality of Viti, Kosovo. As of 2024, the village has a population of 1,549 inhabitants.

== History ==
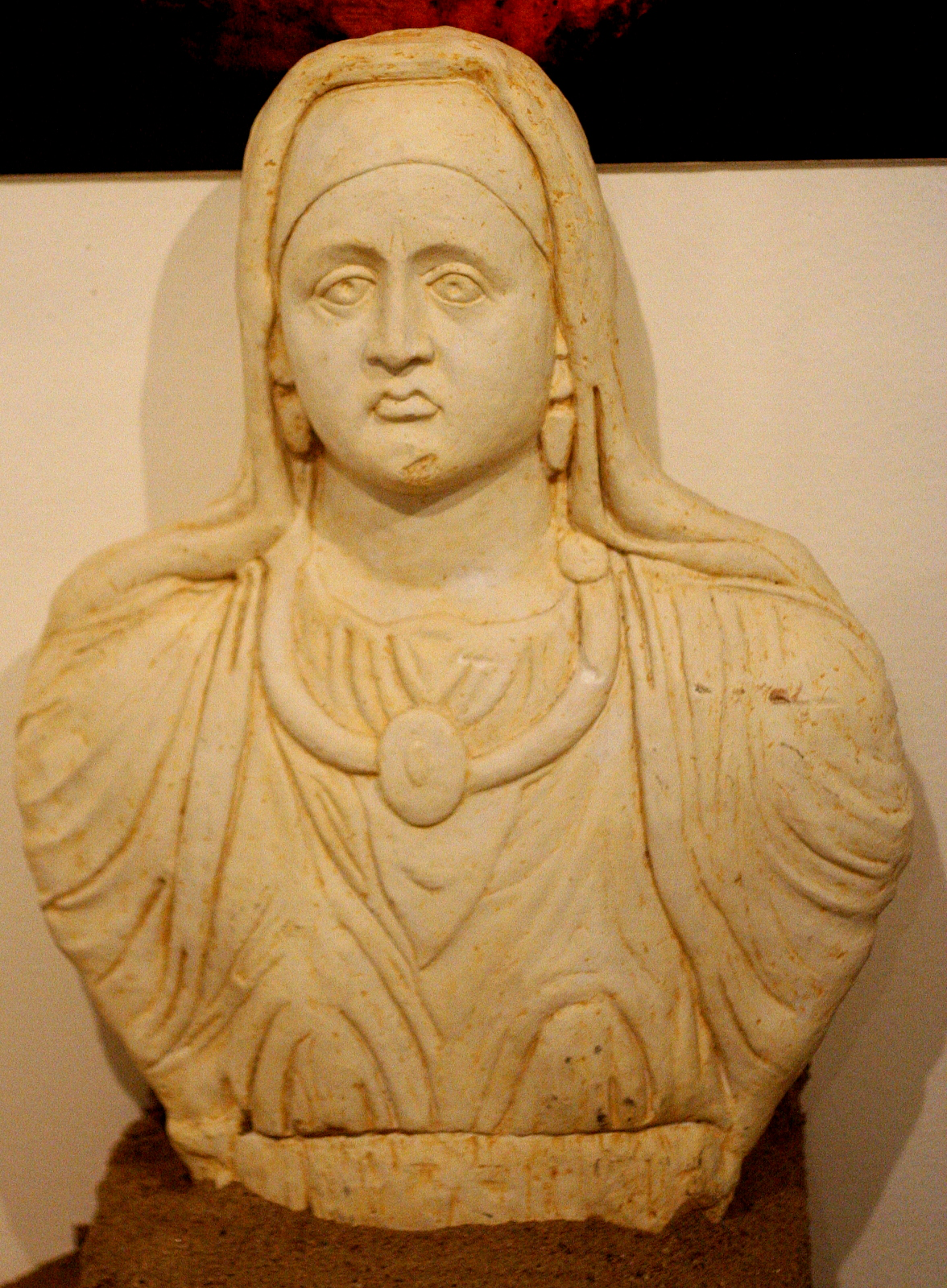
Dea Dardanica, a masterpiece of the Dardanian art

The village of Vërban holds significant archaeological importance. Traces of the Vërban archaeological site show us about a settlement during the Roman times. In the village, in an accidental archaeological discovery is a sculpture found, a masterpiece of the Dardanian art, a reflection of an advanced artistic creation of the indigenous Dardani population. The Dea Dardanica (Latin: Dea Dardanicae) is sculptured in qualitative marble, and reflects a figure of a high-toned Dardanian lady.

== See also ==
- Roman heritage in Kosovo
