= Edi Shukriu =

Kosovan political figure (1950–2023)

Edi M. Shukriu
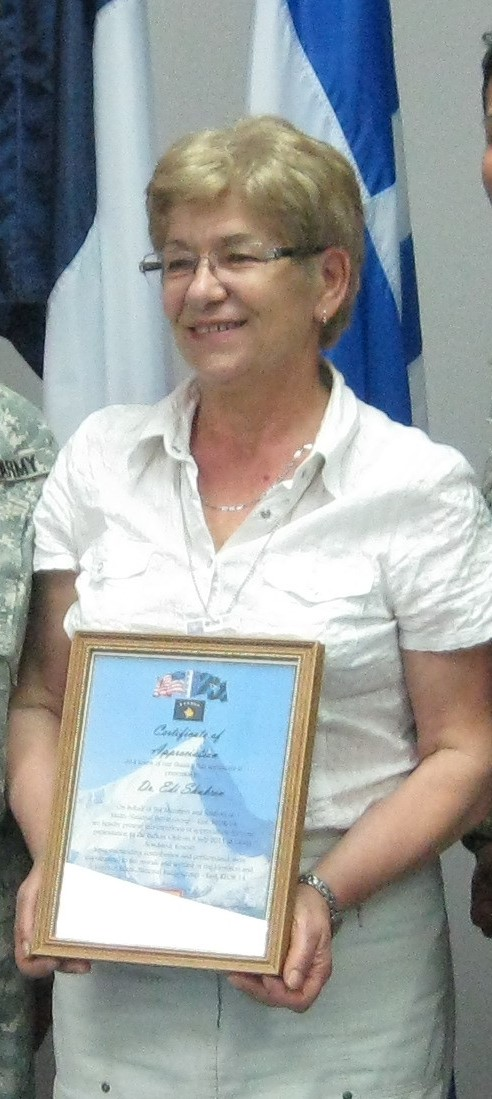
- Born: 22 October 1950; Prizren, Kosovo, Serbia, Federal People's Republic of Yugoslavia
- Died: January 2023 (aged 72)
- Occupations: Politician, archaeologist, poet

Edi M. Shukriu (22 October 1950 – January 2023) was a Kosovan political figure, archaeologist, and writer. She wrote seven books of poetry. She was awarded the Dea Dardanciae award by the Kosovan Ministry of Culture, Youth and Sports, and won the Beqir Musliu Literary Award, the Award of the Writers' Association of Kosovo, and the scientific book of the year award in 1996.

== Biography ==
A native of Prizren, Shukriu was born on 22 October 1950.She earned a master's degree in archaeology from the University of Belgrade in 1972; in October 1990 she finished her doctorate in the same discipline at the University of Pristina. First employed by the Kosovo Museum, she then taught archaeology in Pristina. In 1989 she joined the Democratic League of Kosovo, in whose foreign relations she took a role. From 1995 until 2000 she chaired its women's forum, and she was also a member of the Assembly of the Republic of Kosovo for the party. She was chair of the Kosovo Council for Cultural Heritage from 2009 to 2012, and the vice-president of the PEN Center of Kosovo.

As an archeologist, Shukriu has been called the 'founder of Dardanology". Shukriu was responsible for the discovery of the Goddess on the Throne (Hyjnesha në Fron), a terracotta figure which has become a symbol of the culture of Kosovo Albanians. She researched the fortified settlements in places such as Strezovc, Marec, Gushicë, Vucak, Godanc, Korishë, Batushë, Harilaç.

Shukriu founded the Archaeological Institute of Kosovo, and was a supporter of the Opera and Ballet of Kosovo, the Kosovo Philharmonic Orchestra, and the Kosovo Ballet. Shukriu was awarded the “Dea Dardanciae” award by the Ministry of Culture, Youth and Sports. She also won the 2019 Beqir Musliu Literary Award, the Award of the Writers' Association of Kosovo in 1990, and the scientific book of the year award in 1996.

Shukriu wrote a number of verse collections and plays, as well as several non-fiction works. Among the first Kosovar women to publish poetry in Albanian, she graduated from the Iowa Writers' Workshop in 2005. She continued to teach archaeology and ancient history at the University of Pristina. Shukriu died in January 2023, at the age of 72.
