= Novellia gens =

Ancient Roman family

The gens Novellia was an obscure plebeian family at Rome. The only member of this gens known to have held any magistracies was Torquatus Novellius Atticus, perhaps better known from an anecdote of Pliny the Elder; however, many others are known from inscriptions.

== Origin ==
It seems probable that the nomen Novellius belongs to a class of gentilicia formed either from diminutives of other names, or from cognomina, using the suffix -ellius. In this case, the nomen is apparently derived from the Oscan praenomen Novius, marking the Novellii as a family of Oscan origin. The greatest number of Novellii known from extant inscriptions lived in Mediolanum and the province of Cisalpine Gaul.

== Members ==
This list includes abbreviated praenomina. For an explanation of this practice, see filiation.

- Publius Novellius Atticus, the father of Torquatus, according to a first century inscription from Tibur.
- Torquatus Novellius P. f. Atticus, (Note: Or Novellius Torquatus Atticus.) a native of Mediolanum, held a number of magistracies under the early Empire, serving as military tribune, quaestor, aedile, and praetor; he was curator of public works and charged with administering the census, then proconsul of Gallia Narbonensis under Tiberius and Caligula. Pliny recounts how he won the surname Tricongius by drinking three congii (Note: A congius is approximately 0.92 U.S. gallons, 0.77 Imperial gallons, or 3.48 liters; three congii is the equivalent of 22 U.S. pints, or slightly more than 18 Imperial pints.) of wine at a single draught, in the presence and to the great astonishment of Tiberius. He died at Forum Julii, aged forty-three.
- Gaius Novellius Fortunatus, named in an auction record from Pompeii, dating to AD 57.
- Gaius Novellius Natalis, a magistrate at Pompeii.
- Gaius Novellius C. f. Verinus, named in an inscription from Rome dating to AD 175.
- Marcus Novellius M. f. Montanus, governor of Municipium Dardanorum in Moesia Superior, during the reign of Commodus.
- Marcus Novellius Eros, named in an inscription from Municipium Dardanorum, dating to the time of Commodus.
- Gaius Novellius Octavianus, named in a roll of soldiers of the fifth cohort at Rome, dating to the beginning of the third century.
- Lucius Novellius, named in an inscription from Verona.
- Lucius Novellius, a soldier in the seventh cohort at Rome.
- Marcus Novellius M. f., a soldier in the twenty-second legion, buried at Mogontiacum, aged thirty-three.
- Mansuetus Novellius C. l., a freedman buried at Augusta Taurinorum, in Cisalpine Gaul, aged fifty.
- Quintus Novellius M. f., named in an inscription from Delos.
- Marcus Novellius Aequalis, husband of Egnatia Primigenia, named in an inscription from Mediolanum.
- Publius Novellius Agathopus, erected a monument at Rome to his wife, Murridia Firma.
- Gaius Novellius Amphio, named in an inscription from Genava in Gallia Narbonensis.
- Quintus Novellius Augurinus, father of Quintus Novellius Primus, for whose grave Augurinus erected a monument.
- Publius Novellius Crescens, husband of Tertia, named in an inscription from Duno in Cisalpine Gaul.
- Lucius Novellius Daphnis, mentioned in an inscription from Rome.
- Quintus Novellius Decumus, mentioned in an inscription from Mediolanum.
- Gaius Novellius C. f. Expectatus, named in an inscription from Mediolanum.
- Novellia Fusca, wife of Gaius Allius Pudens, named in an inscription from Mediolanum.
- Lucius Novellius T. f. Hispello, a soldier in the sixteenth legion, buried at Mogontiacum, aged forty-five.
- Novellia Justina, daughter of Lucius Novellius Lanuccus.
- Lucius Novellius Lanuccus, father of Novellia Justina, buried at Aesica in Britain, aged seventy.
- Lucius Novellius Lucifer, son of Crotus and Novellia Trophime, and husband of Novia Scodrina, named in a funerary inscription from Dyrrachium in Macedonia.
- Lucius Novellius Lucrio, a freedman named in an inscription from Rome.
- Gaius Novellius C. f. Marcellinus, buried at Philippi in Macedonia, aged fifty-two.
- Quintus Novellius Martialis, a comrade of Lucius Surius Sabinus, a soldier in the eighth cohort at Rome, for whose grave Martialis erected a monument.
- Gaius Novellius Primianus, mentioned in an inscription from Mediolanum.
- Gaius Novellius Primus, a veteran of the eleventh legion, named in a libationary inscription from Vindonissa in Germania Superior.
- Quintus Novellius Q. f. Primus, buried at Rome, with a monument erected by his father, Quintus Novellius Augurinus.
- Sextus Novellius Proculus, a soldier buried at Rome, for whom a monument was erected by his brother, Novellius Tertius.
- Lucius Novellius Pudens, mentioned in an inscription from Ravenna.
- Gaius Novellius P. f. Rufus, the brother of Quintus Novellius Vatia, named in an inscription from Mediolanum.
- Gaius Novellius C. f. Taluppius, named in a libationary inscription, dedicated to Jupiter Optimus Maximus, at Crenna in Cisalpine Gaul.
- Novellius Tertius, brother of Sextus Novellius Proculus, a soldier buried at Rome.
- Marcus Novellius Ursus, the father of Flavia Tertullina, buried at Tilurium in Illyricum, aged eight years, four months.
- Quintus Novellius P. f. Vatia, the brother of Gaius Novellius Rufus, named in an inscription from Mediolanum.
- Novellius Verus, named in an inscription from Mediolanum.
- Gaius Novellius Vitalis, husband of Valeria Satonia, named in a libationary inscription from Poetovio in Pannonia Superior.

== See also ==
- List of Roman gentes

== Bibliography ==
- Gaius Plinius Secundus (Pliny the Elder), Naturalis Historia (Natural History).
- Theodor Mommsen et alii, Corpus Inscriptionum Latinarum (The Body of Latin Inscriptions, abbreviated CIL), Berlin-Brandenburgische Akademie der Wissenschaften (1853–present).
- René Cagnat et alii, L'Année épigraphique (The Year in Epigraphy, abbreviated AE), Presses Universitaires de France (1888–present).
- "Archaeological News", in American Journal of Archaeology, vol. IX, No. 4, pp. 569–614 (Oct.–Dec. 1894).
- The Roman Inscriptions of Britain (abbreviated RIB), Oxford, (1990–present).
- David Braund, Augustus to Nero: A Sourcebook on Roman History, 31 BC–AD 68, Routledge Revivals, New York (2014), ISBN 978-131-766-958-6.
