= Kosovo Museum =

National museum of Kosovo

- Muzeu i Kosovës; Музеј Косова / Muzej Kosova
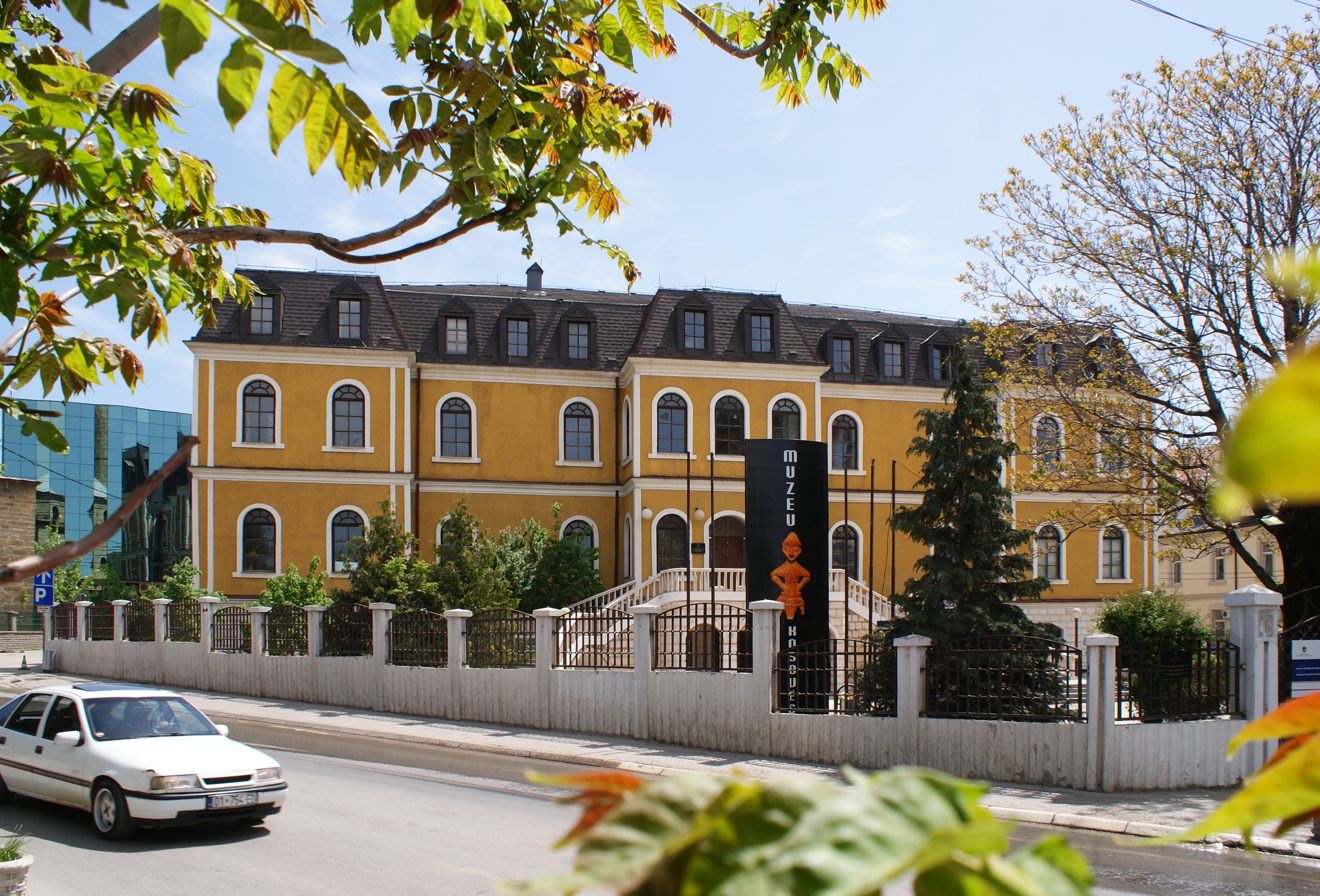
- Established: 1949; 77 years ago
- Location: Ibrahim Lutfiu, Pristina, Kosovo
- Type: National Museum

Cultural Heritage under Permanent Protection
- Official name: Muzeu i Kosovës
- Type: Architectural Heritage: Monument/Ensemble
- Reference no.: 2959

The Kosovo Museum (Albanian: Muzeu i Kosovës; Serbian: Музеј Косова / Muzej Kosova) is the national museum of Kosovo, located in the city of Pristina. Established by Yugoslav authorities in 1949, this is the largest museum in Kosovo. It is situated in a 1889 Austro-Hungarian-style building, formerly used as the high military command headquarters.

The museum is the earliest institution of cultural heritage in Kosovo, established with the goal of preserving, restoration-conservation and presentation of movable heritage on the territory. It is situated in a special facility, from an architectural point of view but also because of its location since it is situated at the old nucleus of the city centre.

== History ==
Founded in 1949, the Kosovo Museum has departments of archaeology, ethnography, and natural science, to which a department for the study of history and the National Liberation Struggle was added in 1959. It has been active in sponsoring archaeological excavations, conservation and other scientific work. Since 1956 it has published an annual journal called Buletin i Muzeut të Kosovës, with articles in Albanian (with summaries in French, English, or German).

The overall museum consists of three museum parts: Kosovo Museum itself, Emin Gjiku's Housing Complex where an ethnological exhibition has been presented, and the Museum of Independence. Museum consists of four sectors, archaeological sector, ethnological sector, historic sector and natural sector. The main museum building consists of 3 halls or galleries and one of them serves as a hall for permanent archaeological exhibitions, but various exhibits are also presented in the inner yard of the museum as well at the lapidarium, respectively in the Archaeological Park, which is located next to the museum building, or on the right side of it. In the cellars of the museum, are located the warehouses of thousands of findings, artefacts and movable fragments of archaeological material, which are systematized and kept in special conditions with particular attention and care. Within the building of Kosovo Museum, namely on its third floor, you can find the working environment of Kosovo Archaeological Institute, a scientific-professional institution and responsible for archaeological research.

== The Ethnological Museum ==
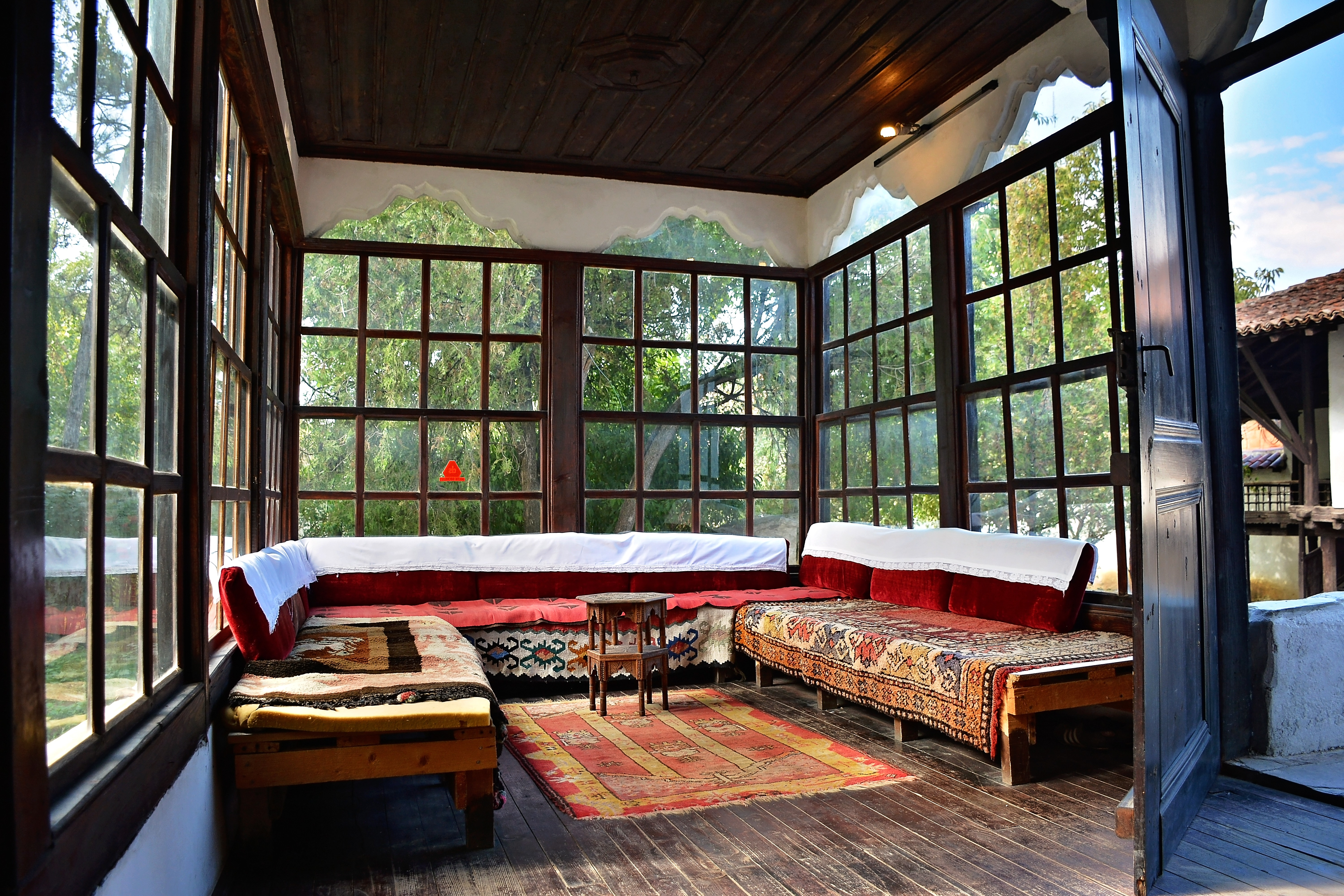
In the museum, tools and items related to lifestyle from the Ottoman Kosovo period are on display.

The Ethnological Museum is an integral part of the museum, located in the old housing complex, consisting of four buildings: two of which date from the 18th century and two others from the 19th century.

The housing complex was constructed by Gjinolli family or Emin Gjiku who then migrated to Turkey in the years 1958–59. Later on, the Natural Museum was opened in this housing complex. In 2006, a permanent ethnological exhibition of Kosovo museum was set in this housing complex. The concept of ethnological museum is based on 4 topics which present the life cycle starting from birth, life, death and spiritual heritage of the Albanians in Kosovo during the Ottoman period.

The stone house or the synagogue is also a part of the museum which during the 1950s was transferred from the old part of the city of Pristina to this housing complex. Today it serves as a centre of contemporary art – Station.

== The Archaeological Park ==
The Archaeological Park, the Lapidarium of Kosovo Museum, was designed to become an additional part of an outdoor exhibition of archaeological heritage of Kosovo. Architectural fragments, epigraphic inscriptions, altars and kennels or grave stones, that apart from mythological scenes, funeral processions, presentation of images of the past descendants supplemented with carved inscriptions, all of these reflecting upon the spiritual and material world of Dardania’s ancient period.

The Archaeological Park of Kosovo Museum has been designed to serve as a lapidarium, which is a predetermined place for exhibiting stone monuments and architectural fragments of an archaeological nature. The Park is intended to serve as a memorial place for the antiquity and the level of civilisations from ancient times and also for the organisation of cultural and educational events for children and young people.

== Gallery ==
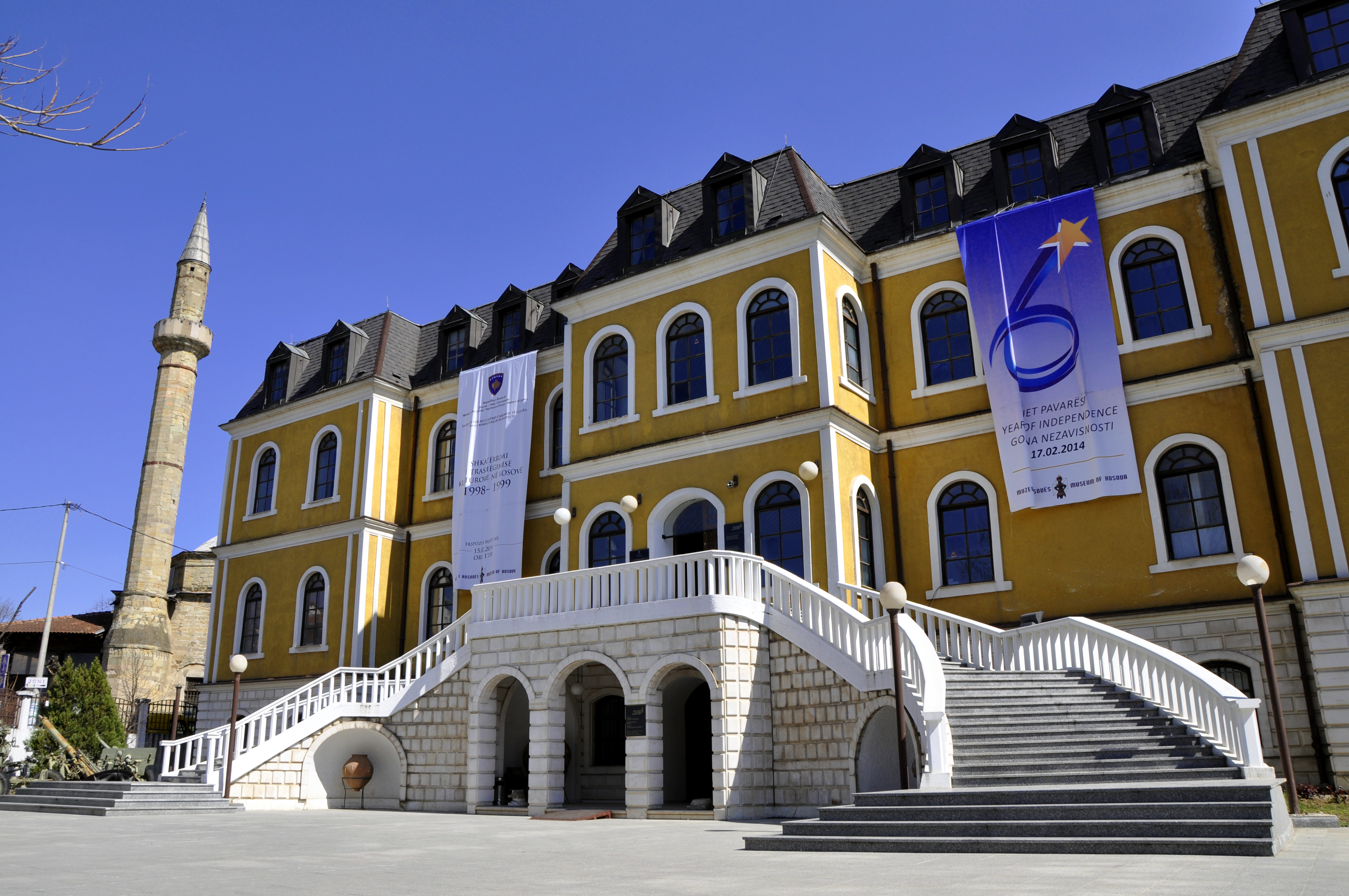
The Museum building

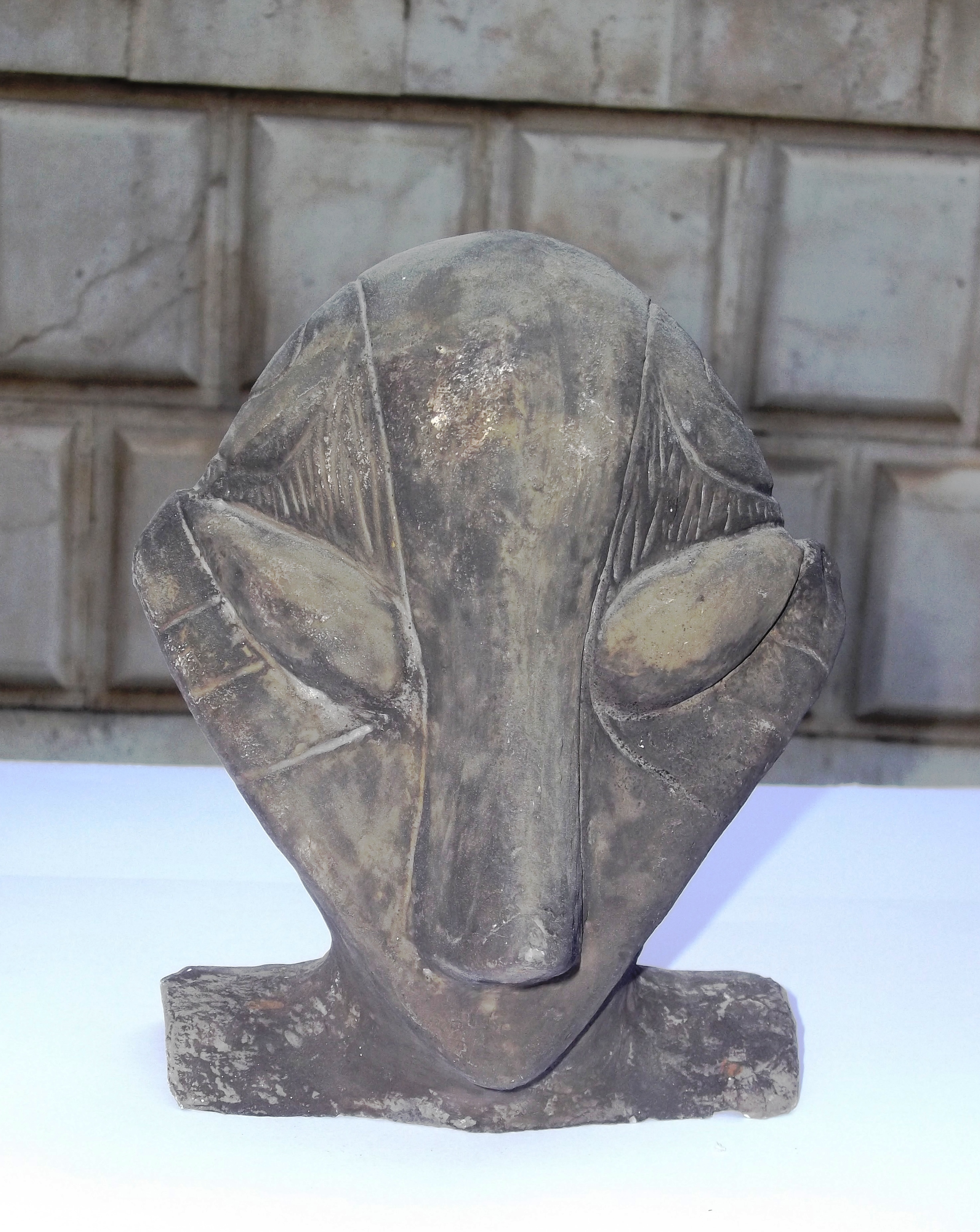
Neolithic anthropomorphic terracotta head

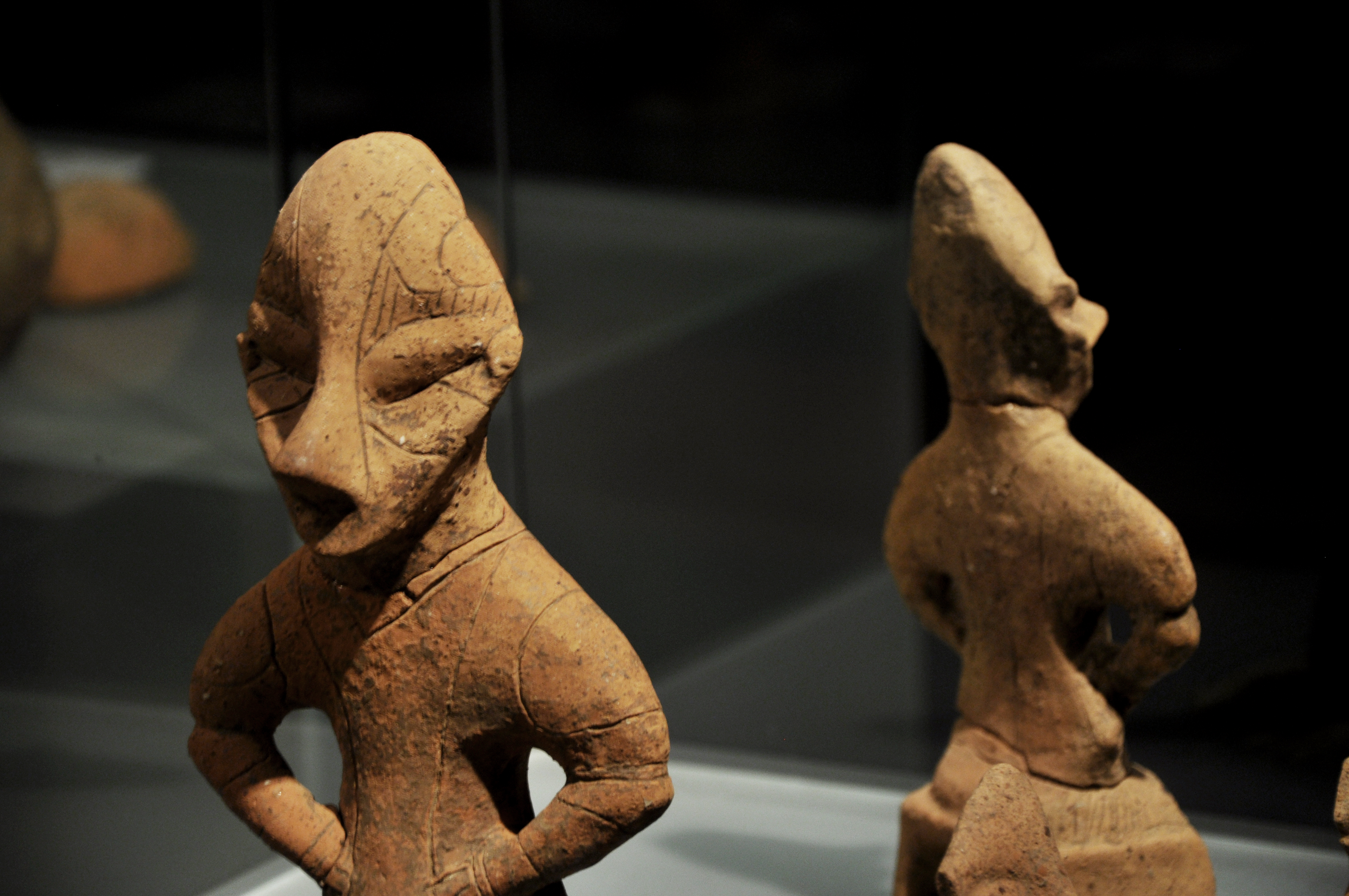
Goddess on the Throne

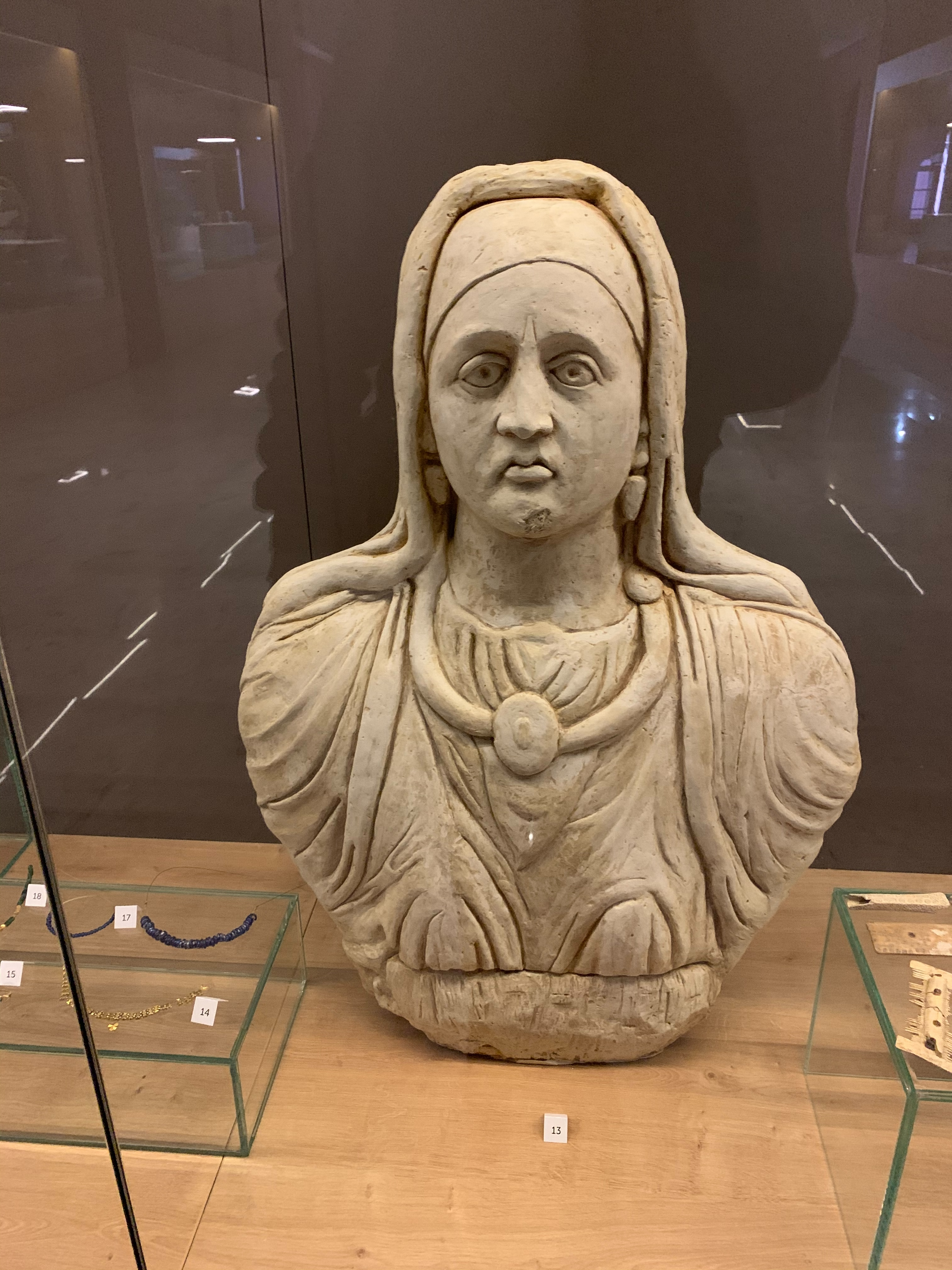
Figure of a high-toned Dardanian lady

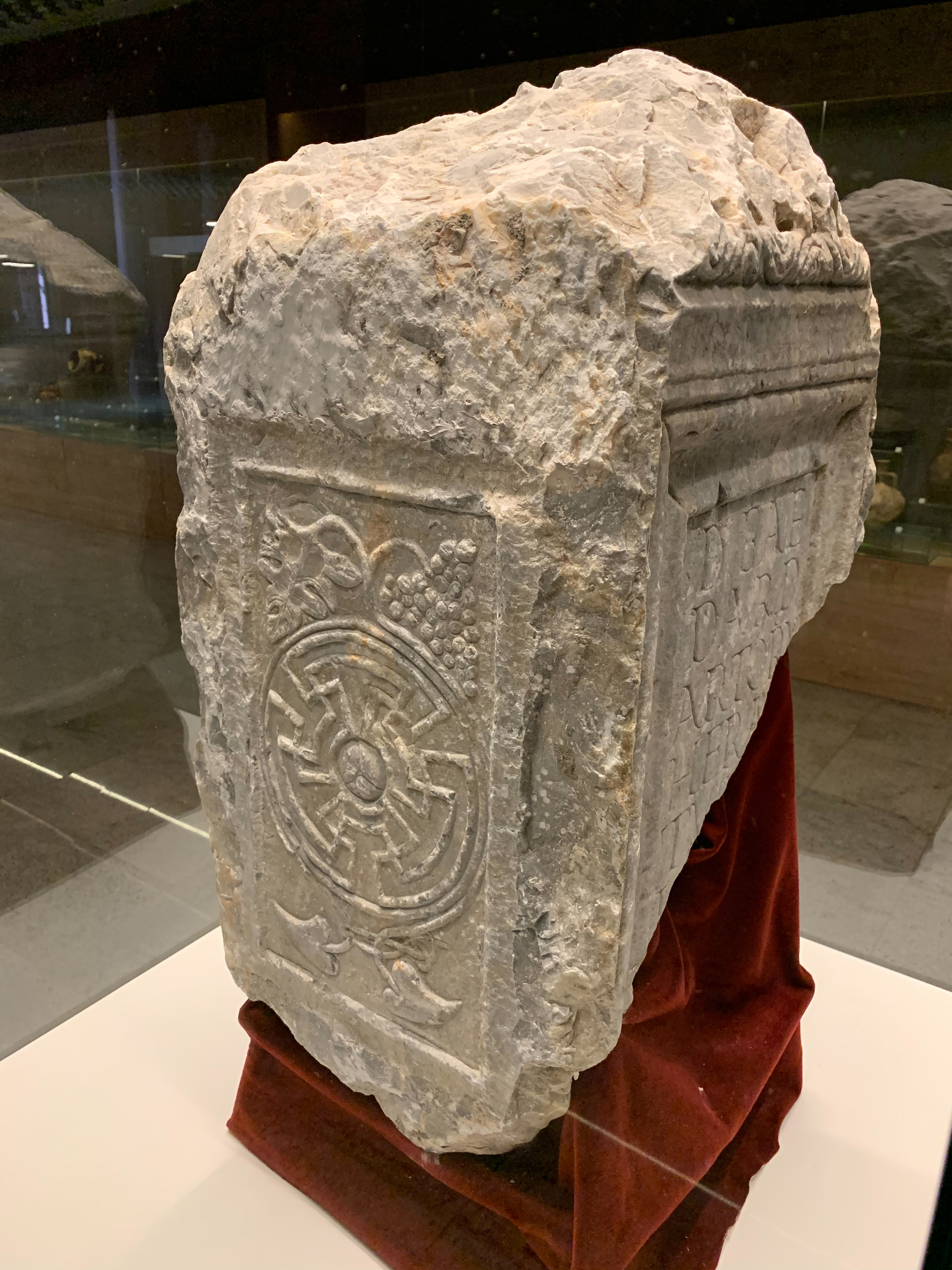
Votive monument dedicated to the dardanian Goddess Dea Dardanica

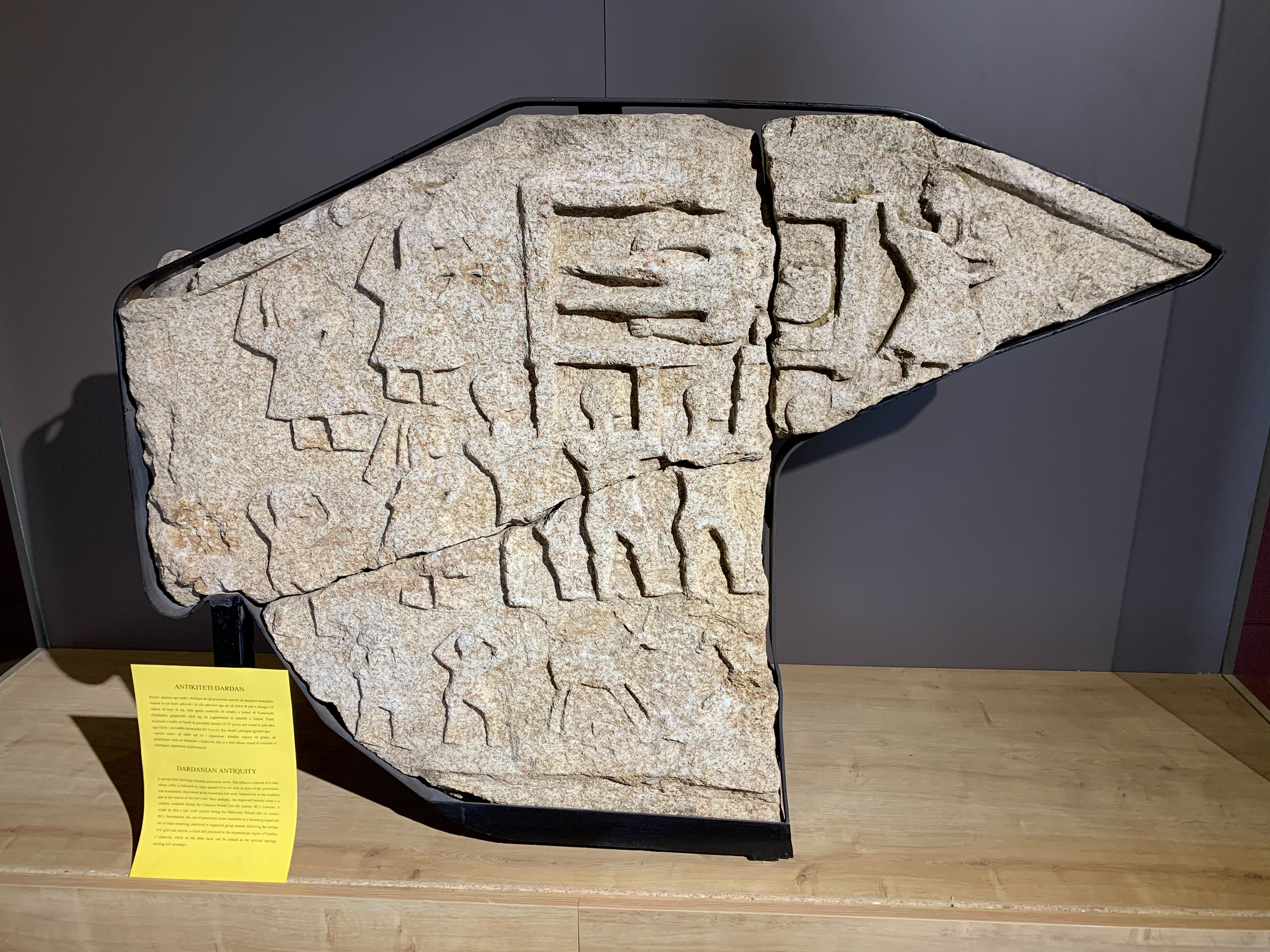
Carved relief showing a funeral procession scene

== See also ==
- History of Kosovo
- Tourism in Kosovo
- Kingdom of Dardania
- Archaeology of Kosovo
- Neolithic sites in Kosovo
- Roman heritage in Kosovo
- Copper, Bronze and Iron Age sites in Kosovo
