= Vërban archaeological site =

Archaeological site in Kosovo

Coordinates: 42.306149°N 21.280174°E

Part of a series of articles upon Archaeology of Kosovo

The Vërban archaeological site, is an archaeological site in the village of Vërban, Viti, Kosovo.

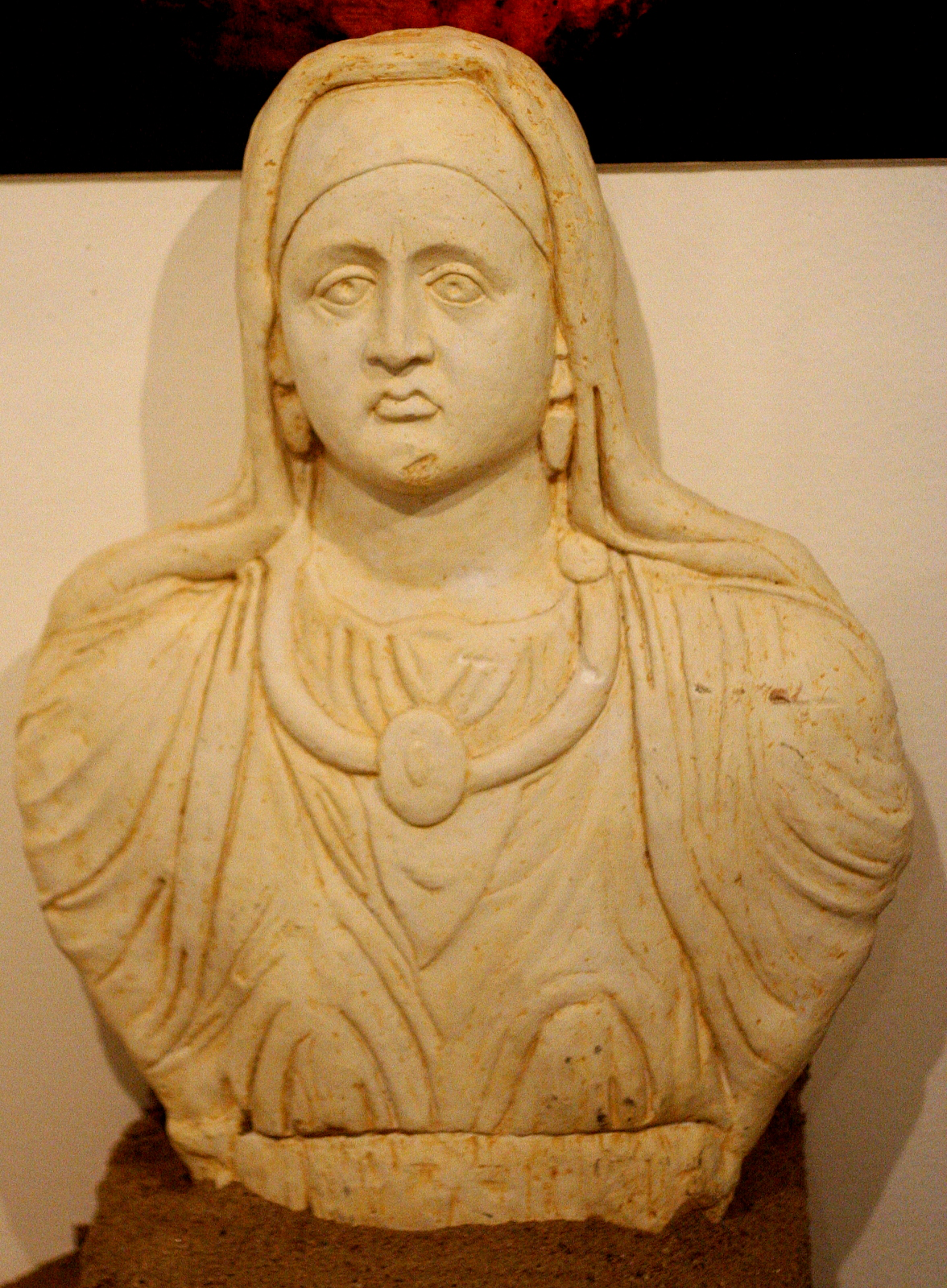
Dea Dardanica, a masterpiece of the Dardanian art

== See also ==
- Roman Dardania
- Roman cities in Illyria
- Archaeology of Kosovo
- Roman Period Sites in Kosovo
- Neolithic Sites in Kosovo
- Copper, Bronze and Iron Age Sites in Kosovo
- Late Antiquity and Medieval Sites in Kosovo
