= Roman heritage in Kosovo =

Historical Roman influence in Kosovo

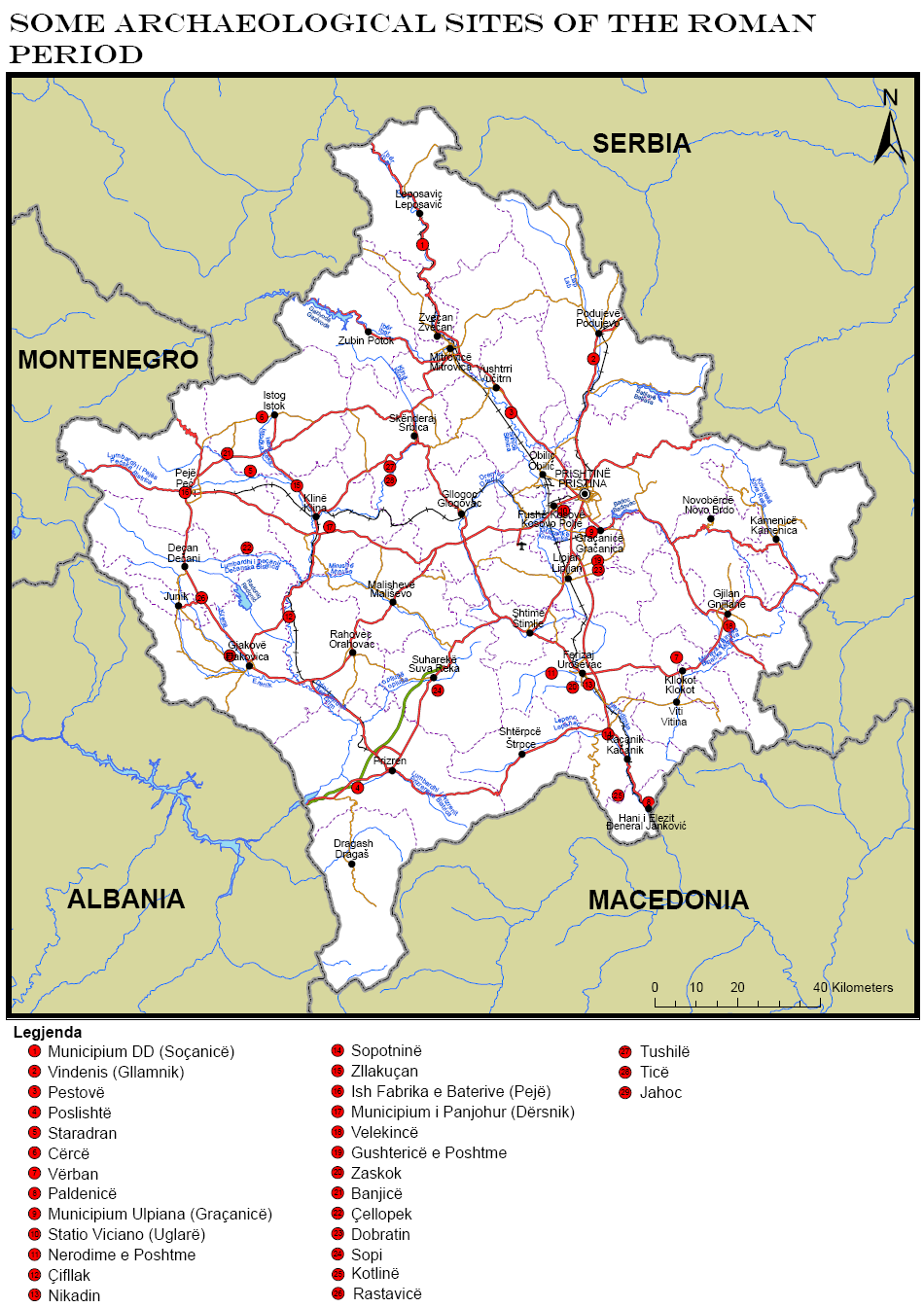
Roman period sites in Kosovo

The Roman heritage sites in Kosovo represent a multitude of monuments of material and spiritual culture, which reflect the Roman period in this region. Among them, a special place is occupied by those that represent the development of art, such as the plastic monuments that are more frequent, and at the same time occupy an important place, because with the presentation of figures in relief and with numerous inscriptions they speak to us enough for this period.

== Overview ==
Dardania fell under Roman occupation in the first century AD, one of the last territories of Illyria to succumb. Being that Dardania had and today Kosovo has a central position between the road networks that connected the south Aegean with the Danube basin, and with the Adriatic Sea, it was a strategic jewel. It also was important for the Romans due to its rich mineral resources, which they exploited and benefited from. We see that most of the towns of ancient Dardania are located either close to a mine, or close to a road. The Dardanian identity has been disputed for a while, and it is known that it was distinctive, similar to the Illyrian, and also with a Roman or Thracian twist to it, due to the occupation and co-habitation. The archaeological surveys and studies of the last century are helping to establish this Dardanian identity in an objective manner, which will lead to a clearer study and explanation of the continuity of culture in this so much disputed region. Below is a listing of the prominent settlements during the Roman period and an explanation of what they were, when they were inhabited, and when they were founded, accompanied by an array of pictures that illustrate the archaeological finds and remnants.

=== Municipium Dardanorum ===
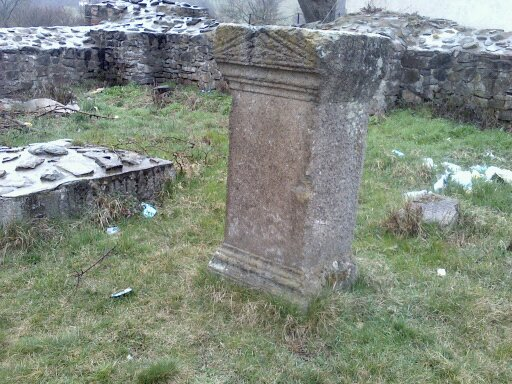
Municipium DD

Municipium Dardanorum or Dardanicum is located in North Kosovo, approximately 27 kilometres north of Mitrovica, in the village of Sočanica, Leposavic municipality. It existed as a prehistoric settlement at first, but continued to develop and change to become a typical ancient Roman town during the period from the last decades of the 1st century, until the first part of the 4th century AD. The site stretches in approximately 30 hectares.

=== Ulpiana ===
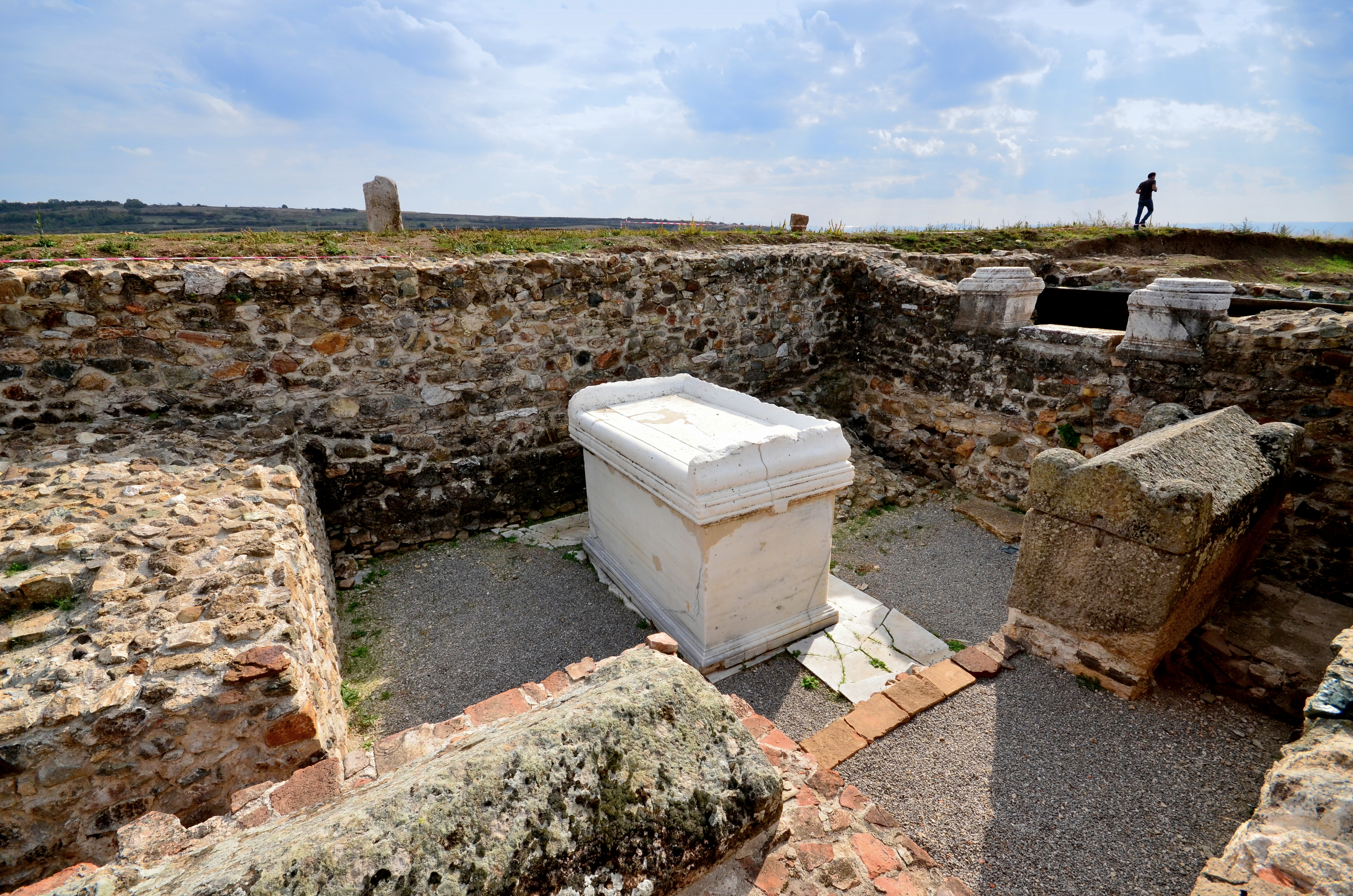
Archaeological excavations in Ulpiana

Ulpiana was a Roman town, established in the 1st century AD, receiving municipium status in 169 AD.

=== Vendenis ===
Statio Vindenis was among three road stations that were constructed in Dardania during Roman rule.

=== Çifllak archaeological site ===
Çifllak site is situated near the Drini i Bardhë river stream, on the left side.

=== Dresnik archaeological site ===
The Archaeological Site of Dresnik is an archaeological site in the village of Dresnik.

=== Kllokot archaeological site ===
The site of Klokot is located close to Banja e Kllokotit.

=== Nerodime e Poshtme ===
Nerodimë e Poshtme site, uncovered in 1988.

=== Nikadin archaeological site ===
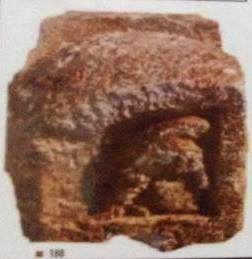
Side view of the Sarcophagus Lid found in Nikadin.

Nikadin. The Nikadin village, located in the town of Ferizaj, is situated 2 kilometers south from the town.

=== Pestova archaeological site ===
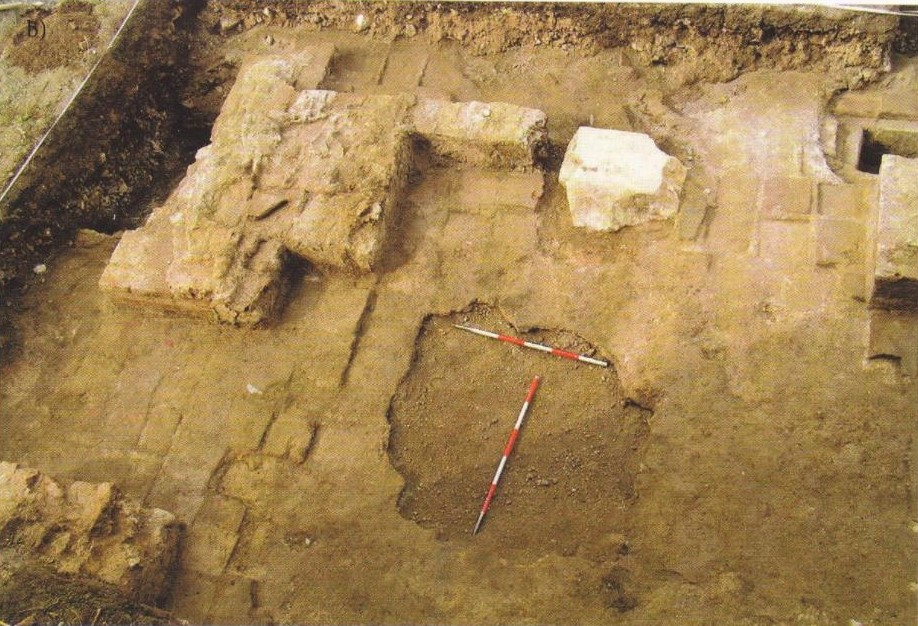
Villa Rustica in Pestova archaeological site

The site of Pestova is located in the municipality of Vushtrri, discovered in 2005. Remains of a building, ruins of a villae rusticae were partially unearthed.

=== Poslishte archaeological site ===
The site of Poslishte is a recently discovered Roman road junction in the vicinity of the village of Poslishtë, 1 kilometer south of Vlashnjë in the Vërmica-Prizren road, set along the ancient Via Lissus-Naissus.

=== Paldenica archaeological site ===
The site of Paldenica located near the village of Paldenica, around 150 m on the left side of the Pristina-Skopje road. Traces of a necropolis and other movable archaeological materials have been uncovered.

=== Vicianum ===
Station Viciano situated in the northwest part of the municipality of Gračanica.

== See also ==
- Illyrians
- Dardanians
- Kingdom of Dardania
- Roman cities in Illyria
- Illyricum (Roman province)
- Dardania (Roman province)

== Bibliography ==
- Kraja, Mehmet, ed. (2018). "Fjalori Enciklopedik i Kosovës". (Encyclopedic Dictionary of Kosova) (in Albanian). Vol. 2. Pristina: Kosova Academy of Sciences and Arts. p. 1730. ISBN 9789951615846. OCLC 1080379844.
- Nicholas Marquez Grant, Linda Fibiger. "Kosovo" The Routledge Handbook of Archaeological Human Remains and Legislation, Taylor & Francis, 2011, ISBN 1136879560, ISBN 9781136879562
- Milot Berisha. "Archaeological Guide of Kosovo", Kosovo Ministry of Culture, Youth and Sports and Archaeological Institute of Kosovo, Pristina 2012, Print
- Luan Përzhita, Kemajl Luci, Gëzim Hoxha, Adem Bunguri, Fatmir Peja, Tomor Kastrati. "Harta Arkeologjike e Kosovës vëllimi 1/ Archaeological Map of Kosovo vol.1" Kosova Academy of Sciences and Arts, Pristina 2006, ISBN 9789951413596
- Cultural Heritage Without Borders. "An Archaeological Map of the Historic Zone of Prizren", CHwB Kosovo office, Report Series No.2/2006.
- Gail Warrander, Verena Knaus. "Kosovo 2nd ed." Bradt Travel Guides, 2011, ISBN 1841623318, ISBN 9781841623313
- Besiana Xharra, Source: Balkan Insight, "Kosovo's Lost City Rises From Earthy Tomb", https://archaeologynewsnetwork.blogspot.com/2011/01/kosovos-lost-city-rises-from-earthy.html#.UR95dvI7owo
- Tom Derrick, "Ulpiana: Digging in Kosovo" source: http://www.trinitysaintdavid.ac.uk/en/schoolofclassics/news/name,14937,en.html
- Philip L. Kohl, Clare Fawcett, "Nationalism, Politics and the Practice of Archaeology", Cambridge University Press, 1995, ISBN 0521558395, ISBN 9780521558396
