= Viciana =

Ancient Roman road station mansio in the Kosovo field

Coordinates: 42.822222°N 20.969444°E

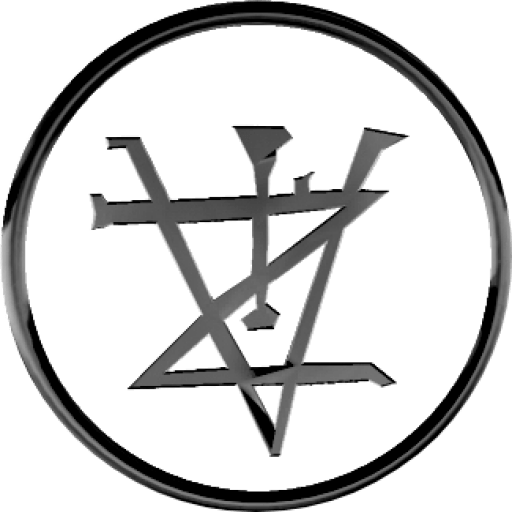
Reproduction of the Roman inscription VIZIANA found in North Macedonia

Viciana (Latin: Viziana - Vizianum) or Station Viciano was a Roman road station (mansio type) of unclear location, somewhere in Kosovo field.

== History ==
Viciana was a stopping place for caravans that travelled the Lissus–Naissus route, one of the most important Roman roads. The route started from Lezha (Lissus) on the Adriatic coast, went through the Drin river valley, crossed through Dardania, and continued to Niš (Naissus).

The location is unclear. It has been theorized to have been somewhere in the Kosovo field or in the present-day city of Vushtrri or its surrounding areas. In addition, approximately 4 km south of Vushtrri, in the village of Pestovë, there are the archaeological ruins of the Roman villa known as Vila rustica, Pestova (archaeological site).

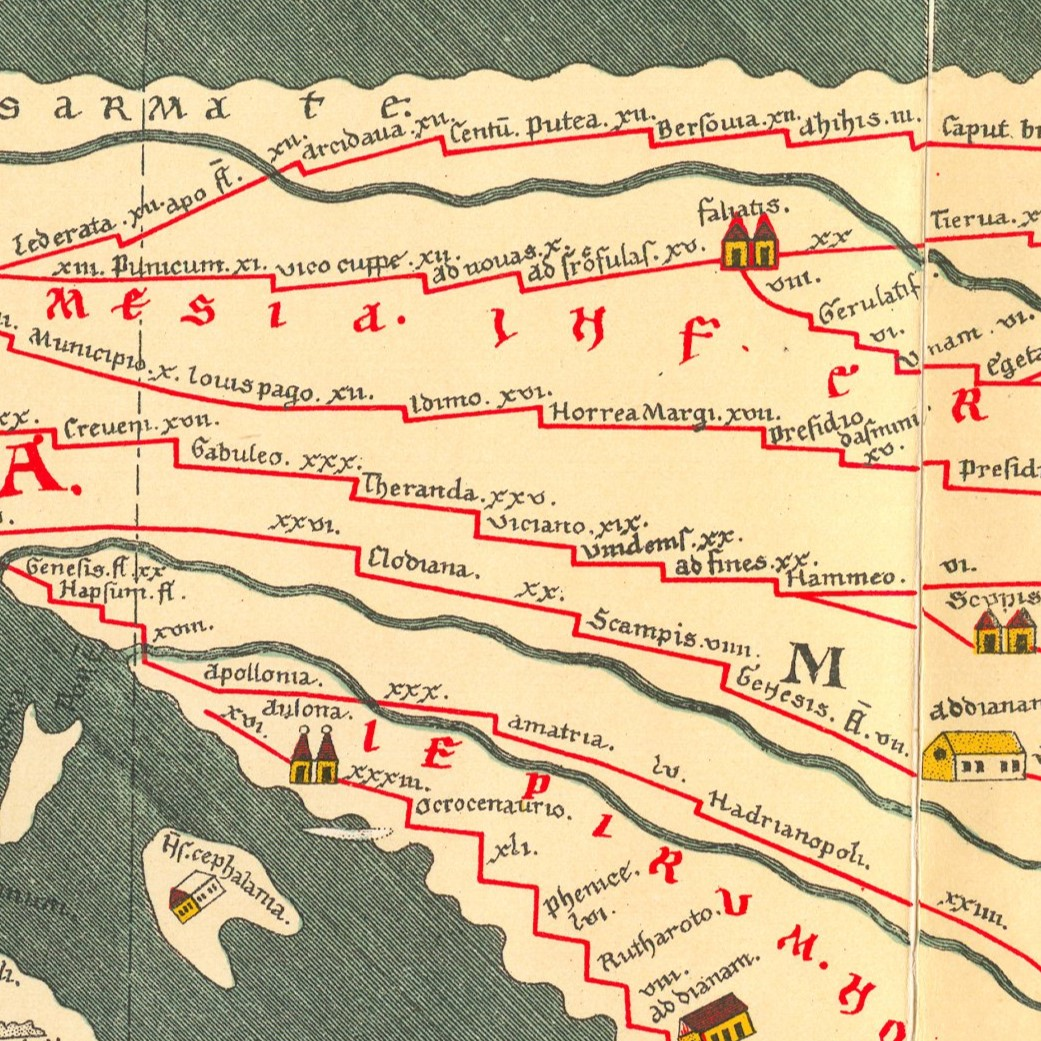
Viciana in the Tabula Peutingeriana, in the middle along with Theranda and Vendenis

Viciano as a road station is recorded in the Tabula Peuntingeriana map, a medieval (15th century) map and copy of a 3rd-century Roman map showing this same itinerary.

== Gallery ==
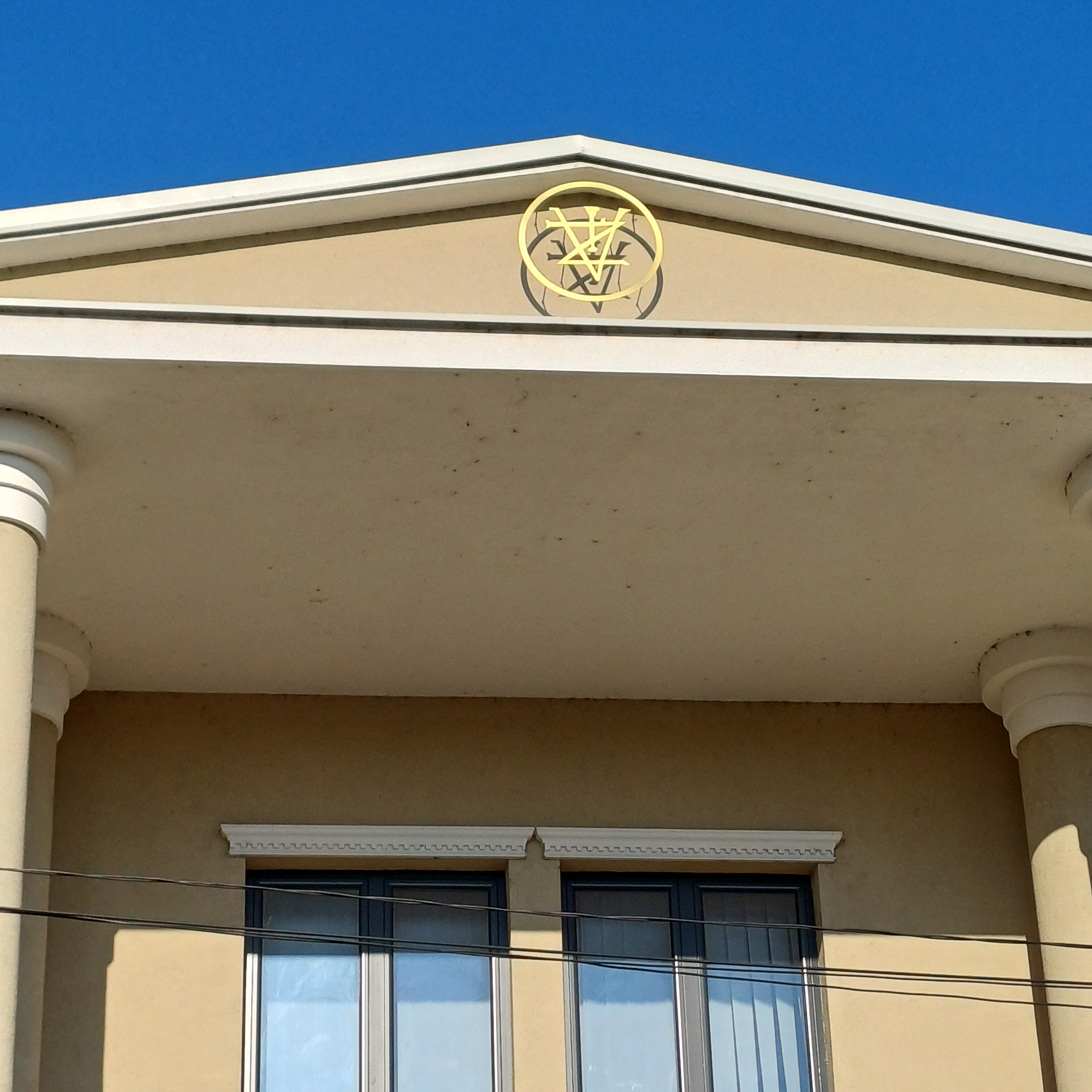
The reproduction of a Roman inscription today is the cultural symbol of the city of Vushtrri.

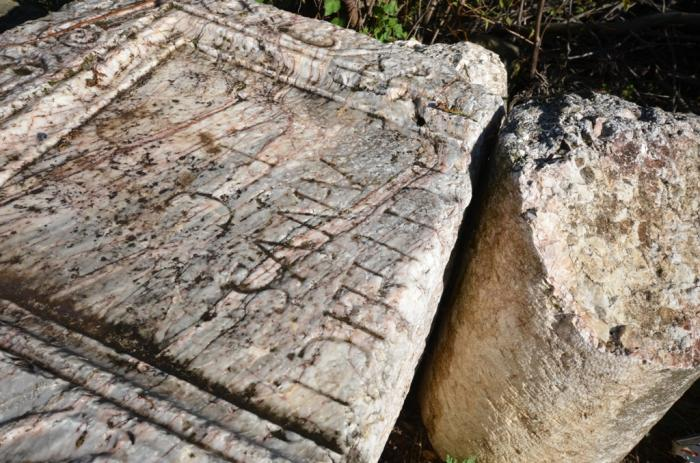
Archaeological findings of Roman inscriptions in Duboc Fortress near Vushtrri

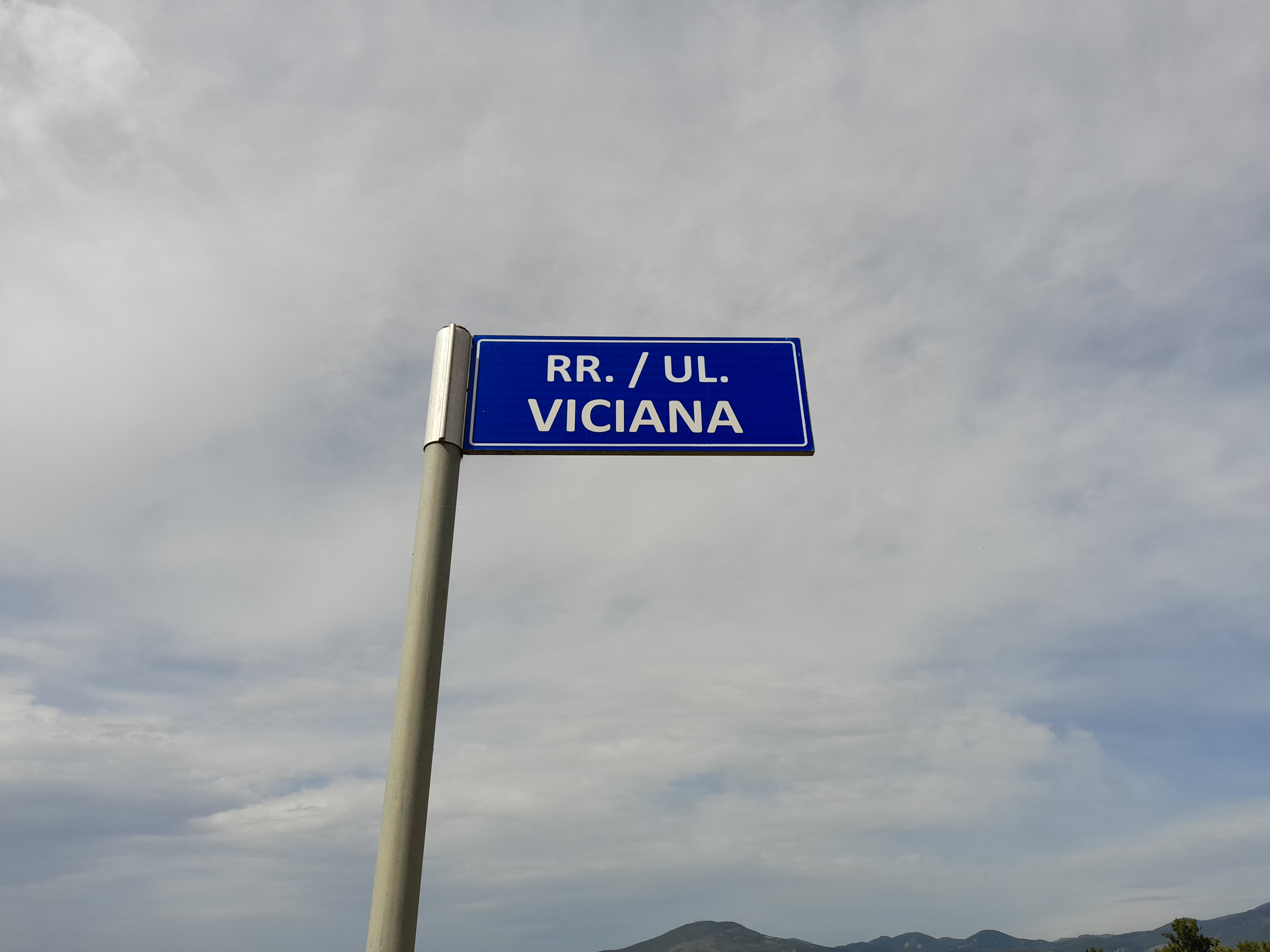
Sign of the Viciana street in Vushtrri

== See also ==
- List of monuments in Vushtrri

== Sources ==
- Mikl-Curk, Iva (1980). Putevi i komunikacije u antici. Savez Arheoloških Društava Jugoslavije.
