= Dea Dardanica =

Dardanian deity

Dea Dardanicae
- Goddess of Dardania, fertility, sun.
- Ancient white marble statue of Dea Dardanica (3rd–4th century CE) from Mediana, depicting the goddess in a long chiton holding an ox in her right hand and a money purse in her left, with a wild boar's head and a labrys at her feet. The veiled head is missing. (National Museum of Niš)
- Animals: Ox, goat, boar, rooster
- Symbol: Money purse, labrys

Dea Dardanica (or Dea Dard, Dea Dardanicae; Latin for Dardanian goddess) is the tutelary goddess of the region of Dardania. She is thought to be a goddess of fertility, the sun, and cosmic order.

== Overview ==
Dea Dardanica is the very conventional name used in modern scholarship for a goddess attested in ancient Dardania, mainly through inscriptions and votive monuments from the called Roman period. The evidence is limited, and no source preserves a full mythology or description of her cult at all.

The goddess has been interpreted by experts as a continuation of a local Dardanian deity, as a Roman-period expression of regional identity, or as a combination of the two. The debate reflects the context of the finds, many of which belong to the imperial period and are associated with military or administrative personnel. Among the best examples are the altars from "Smira and Vendenis",whose inscriptions ar mention members of Legio IV Flavia Felix. The iconography associated with Dea Dardanica has been connected with protection, fertility, territorial identity and, in some studies, solar or cosmological symbolism, among other ideas. These interpretations remain tentative, since the surviving material does not define her attributes systematically.

== Depictions ==
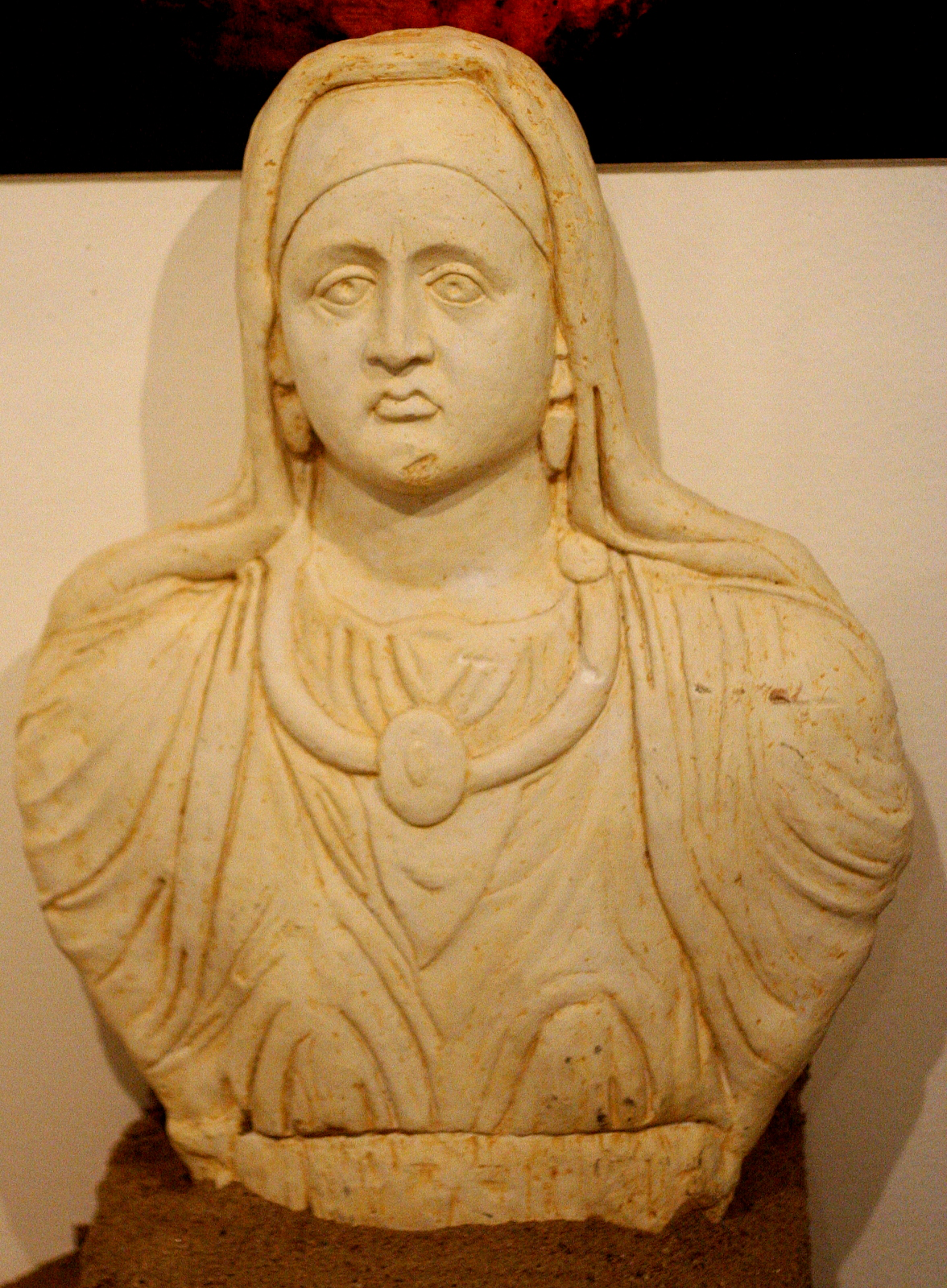
Dea Dardanica found in Vërban, Kosovo

Distribution of archeological finds of Dea Dardanica in Roman Dardania and in the adjacent territories of Moesia Superior

The bust of the woman from Vërban, is an archaeological artifact found in Kosovo that is thought to represent the deity. The artifact was found in the archaeological site of Vërban, which is located in the municipality of Viti.

== Symbols ==
Dea Dardanicae has been associated with a variety of symbols. Most notably, the kid is depicted on the chest of the Dardanian deity, which has been interpreted by archaeologist Edi Shukriu as a reflection of prehistoric traditions tied to goat cults, fertility, and environmental regeneration. In the religious practices dedicated to the goddess, the kid is thought to have served as a sacrificial animal, similar to the sacrificial role of the billy goat in the synchronous Illyrian cults of Bindus and Vidasus.

== See also ==
- Illyrian religion
- Vërban archaeological site
- Kingdom of Dardania

== Sources ==
- Shukriu, Edi (2014). Hyjnesha Dardane [Dea Dardanicae] (in Albanian). Akademia e Shkencave dhe e Arteve e Kosovës. ISBN 978-9951-615-35-8.
- Hajdari, Arben; Goddard, Christophe J. (2023). "Le culte de la déesse dardanienne, dea Dard(…), au cœur de la diplomatie divine de l'armée romaine". Mnemosyne. 76 (7): 1198–1215. doi:10.1163/1568525x-bja10171.
- Anđelković Grašar, Jelena (2015). "Female Power that Protects: Who is the Woman who Takes Care of the City? Goddess Protectresses on the Territory of the Central Balkans in Late Antiquity". Arheologija i prirodne nauke (Archaeology and Science). 11: 79–88.
