= Environmental regeneration =

Environmental regeneration may refer to:

- Environmental remediation (through active intervention)
- autonomous regeneration (ecology)
