= Bindus =

Bindus can refer to:

- Deity in Illyrian religion, identified with Neptune
- Latvian variant of Benedict (given name). Feast day of St. Benedict used to be called Bindus diena in Latvian.
