= Dardania (Roman province) =

Roman province in the central Balkans

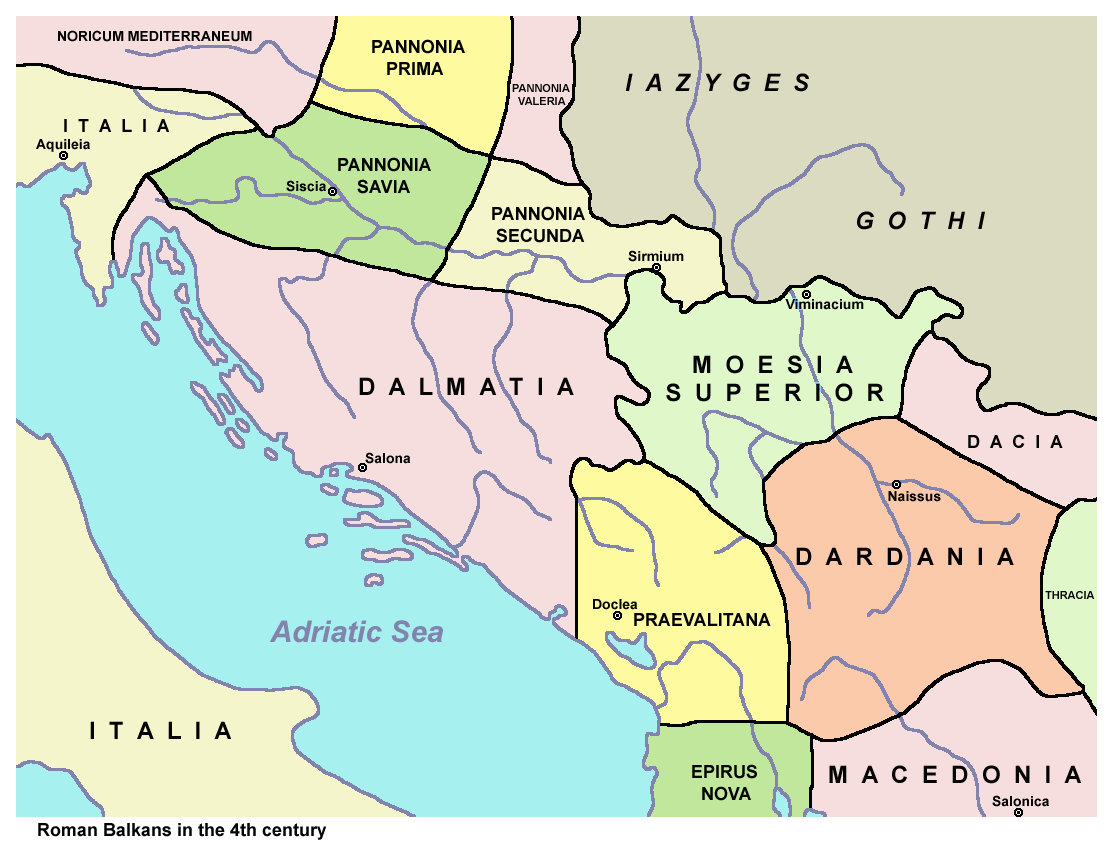
Roman provinces after administrative reforms in the 4th century. Dardania in beige.

Roman province of Dardania, with the administrative territory of the Municipium of Ulpiana.

Dardania (/dɑːrˈdeɪniə/; Latin: Dardania; Ancient Greek: Δαρδανία) was a Roman province in the Central Balkans, initially an unofficial region in Moesia (87–284), and then a province administratively part of the Diocese of Moesia (293–337). It was named after the tribe of the Dardani who inhabited the region in classical antiquity before the Roman conquest. Parts of present-day Kosovo formed the core of ancient Dardania including major historic sites like Ulpiana as well as other places such as Vindenis. During the late Imperial period the Dardanian territory was the homeland of many Roman emperors, notably Constantine the Great and Justinian the Great.

== Background ==
Dardania is named after the Dardani, a tribe that lived in the region and formed the Kingdom of Dardania in the 4th century BC. The eastern parts of the region were at the Thraco-Illyrian contact zone. In archaeological research, Illyrian names are predominant in western Dardania (present-day Kosovo), while Thracian names are mostly found in eastern Dardania (present-day south-eastern Serbia). Thracian names are absent in western Dardania; some Illyrian names appear in the eastern parts. The boundary between them ran approximately along the Morava valley and down the eastern side of Kosovo. The names of the ruling elite in the east appear to be Illyrian but a number of local names also appear. The correspondence of Illyrian names - including those of the ruling elite - in Dardania with those of the southern Illyrians suggests a "thracianization" of parts of Dardania. Celts were present in Dardania in 279 BC. Z.Mirdita affirms the Illyrian origin of the Dardanians and says that in Dardania a visible Paleo-Balkan ethnocultural element is present, intertwined with the Thracian element.

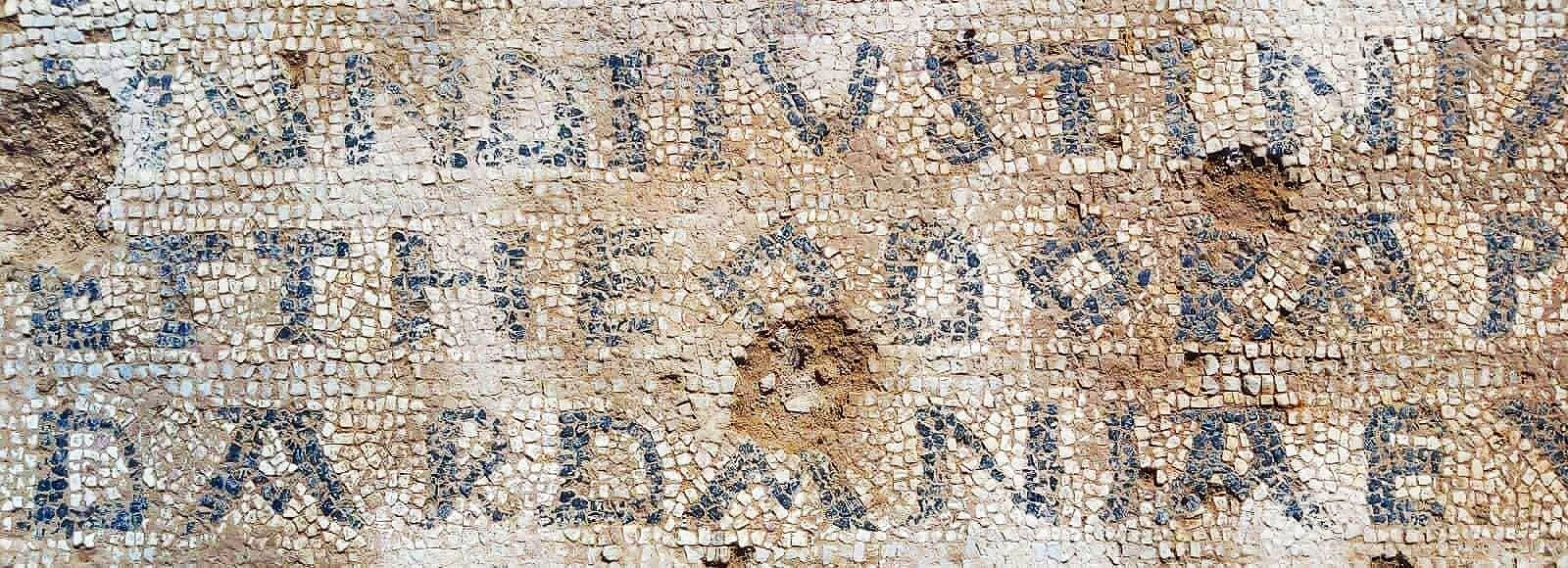
Mosaic dedicated to Emperor Justinian the Great. Unearthed 2023 in Ulpiana,Kosovo

In 179 BC, the Bastarnae conquered the Dardani, who later, in 174, pushed them out in a war that proved catastrophic, and, a few years later, in 170 BC, the Macedonians defeated the Dardani. Macedonia and Illyria became Roman protectorates in 168 BC. The Scordisci, a tribe of Celtic origin, most likely subdued the Dardani in the mid-2nd century BC, after which there is for a long time no mention of the Dardani. In 97 BC, the Dardani are mentioned again, defeated by the Macedonian Roman army. Dardanian slaves or freedmen at the time of the Roman conquest were clearly of Paleo-Balkan origin, according to their personal names, noted as being mostly of the "Central-Dalmatian type". Dardania was Romanized early on. The Roman province of Dardania contained some Roman towns and several large estates, but it was far from being Romanized.

== Administration ==
After the Roman conquest, the pre-Roman Dardania was organized into the Moesia province. During the reign of Domitian (81–96), in 86, Moesia was subdivided into Upper and Lower Moesia (Moesia Superior and Moesia Inferior). The old name of Dardania was used for a new province part of Moesia Superior. Ptolemy (100–170) calls Dardania a special district of Moesia Superior.

The Diocese of Moesia was a diocese established by Emperor Diocletian (r. 284–305). During his reign, the diocese included 11 provinces, one of which was Dardania. Dardania and Moesia Prima were established by dividing them from Moesia Superior, probably under Diocletian. During or likely after emperor Constantine I (r. 306–337), Dacia Mediterranea was created out of parts of Dardania and Thrace. The two new dioceses, Moesia and Dacia, were grouped into the new praetorian prefecture of Illyricum in the second half of the 4th century, which essentially covered the same area as the earlier Diocese of Moesia.

== Religion ==
Distribution of archeological finds related to Dea Dardanica in Roman Dardania and its surrounding regions

Little is known regarding Christianity in the Balkans in the first centuries AD. Bishop Dacus of Macedonia, from Dardania, was present at the First Council of Nicaea (325).

In 535, emperor Justinian I (527–565) created the Archbishopric of Justiniana Prima as a regional primacy with ecclesiastical jurisdiction over all provinces of the Diocese of Dacia, including the province of Dardania.

== Economy ==
According to the Expositio totius mundi (ca. 350), Dardania supplied Macedonia with cheese and lard.

== Cities and towns ==
The main centres of Roman Dardania were Scupi (Skopje), Naissus (Niš) and Ulpiana (Lipjan). At the time of Moesia Superior, the towns in Dardania included Naissus, Scupi, Ulpiana, Therranda, Vicianum, Vindenis, Velanis, Dardapara, Quemedava, Diocletiana, Sintia, Meria and Damastion. Justiniana Prima and Tauresium were also included at the time of Justinian.

The Romans occupied Naissos (Latin: Naissus) during the "Dardanian War" (75–73 BC) and set up a legionary camp. The city (called refugia and vici in pre-Roman relation), because of its strategic position (Thracians were based to the south), developed as an important garrison and market town of Moesia Superior. The Romans also founded a mining town named municipium Dardanicum.

== Aftermath ==
Provinces in the Balkans in the 6th century.

The area remained part of the Eastern Roman, Byzantine Empire, after the Eastern–Western Roman split in the 5th century. Procopius (500–560) used the old Roman provinces to describe the geography of the Balkans. According to Buildings of Justinian IV, there were 8 new and 61 restored fortifications in Dardania. Dardania was a region in which Justinian's restoration process was predominant. In 518, an earthquake devastated Dardania, followed by famine that killed much of the population and weakened the Empire's defences. According to Florin Curta, a small number of Slavs (Sclaveni and Antes) migrated to the Balkans in the 6th century.

== See also ==
- Illyrian emperors
- Serbia in the Roman era
- History of North Macedonia
- History of Kosovo
- History of Skopje
- Illyricum (Roman province)
- Roman heritage in Kosovo

== Sources ==
- Bulić, Dejan (2013). "The Fortifications of the Late Antiquity and the Early Byzantine Period on the Later Territory of the South-Slavic Principalities, and their re-occupation". The World of the Slavs: Studies of the East, West and South Slavs: Civitas, Oppidas, Villas and Archeological Evidence (7th to 11th Centuries AD). Belgrade: The Institute for History. pp. 137–234. ISBN 9788677431044.
- Curta, Florin (2001). The Making of the Slavs: History and Archaeology of the Lower Danube Region, c. 500–700. Cambridge: Cambridge University Press. ISBN 9781139428880.
- Curta, Florin (2006). Southeastern Europe in the Middle Ages, 500–1250. Cambridge: Cambridge University Press. ISBN 9780521815390.
- Cvjetićanin, Tatjana (2006). Late Roman Glazed Pottery: Glazed Pottery from Moesia Prima, Dacia Ripensis, Dacia Mediterranea and Dardania. Belgrade: National Museum. ISBN 9788672690880.
- Harnack, Adolf (1998). The Expansion of Christianity in the First Three Centuries. Vol. 1–2. Wipf and Stock Publishers. ISBN 978-1-57910-002-5.
- Malcolm, Noel (1998). Kosovo: A Short History. Macmillan. ISBN 0-333-66612-7.
- Mócsy, András (2014) [1974]. Pannonia and Upper Moesia: A History of the Middle Danube Provinces of the Roman Empire. New York: Routledge. ISBN 9781317754251.
- Papazoglu, Fanula (1978). The Central Balkan Tribes in pre-Roman Times: Triballi, Autariatae, Dardanians, Scordisci and Moesians. Amsterdam: Hakkert. ISBN 9789025607937.
- Petrović, Vladimir P. (2007). "Pre-Roman and Roman Dardania: Historical and Geographical Considerations" (PDF). Balcanica (37). Balkanološki institut SANU: 7–23.
- Петровић, Владимир П. (2007). Дарданија у римским итинерарима: Градови и насеља (PDF). Београд: Балканолошки институт САНУ.
- Popović, Radomir V. (1996). Le Christianisme sur le sol de l'Illyricum oriental jusqu'à l'arrivée des Slaves. Thessaloniki: Institute for Balkan Studies. ISBN 9789607387103.
- Roisman, Joseph; Worthington, Ian (2010). A Companion to Ancient Macedonia. John Wiley & Sons. ISBN 978-1-4051-7936-2.
- Syme, Ronald (1999) [1935]. The Provincial at Rome: And, Rome and the Balkans 80BC-AD14. University of Exeter Press. ISBN 978-0-85989-632-0.
- Turlej, Stanisław (2016). Justiniana Prima: An Underestimated Aspect of Justinian's Church Policy. Krakow: Jagiellonian University Press. ISBN 9788323395560.
- Wilkes, J. J. (1992). The Illyrians. Blackwell. ISBN 0-631-19807-5.
- Wilkes, John (2012). "Dardani". In Hornblower, Simon; Spawforth, Antony; Eidinow, Esther (eds.). The Oxford Classical Dictionary. OUP Oxford. p. 414. ISBN 978-0-19-954556-8.
