= Municipium Dardanorum =

Archaeological site near Mitrovica, Kosovo

Coordinates: 43°3′17″N 20°48′36″E

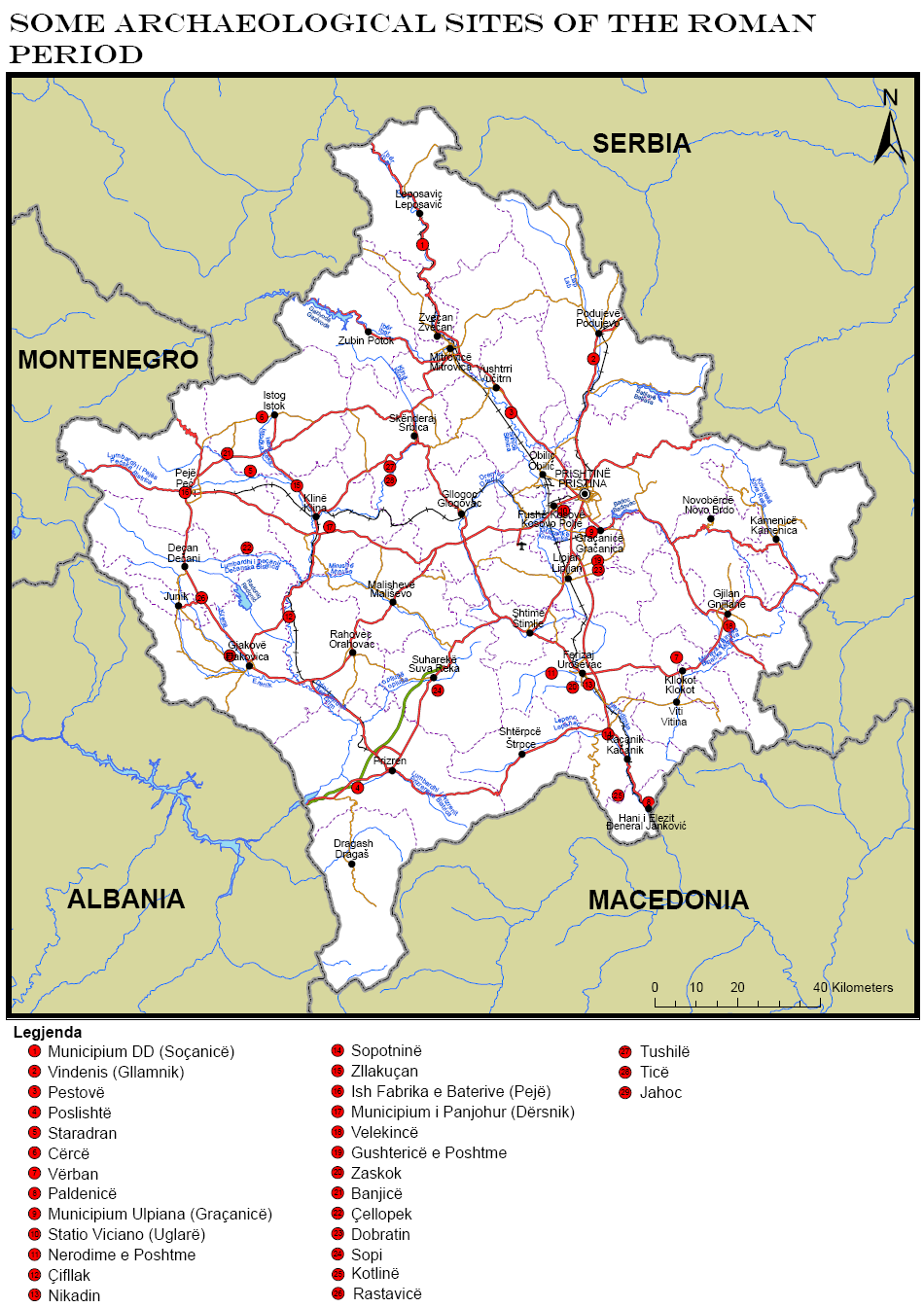
Roman Period sites in Kosovo

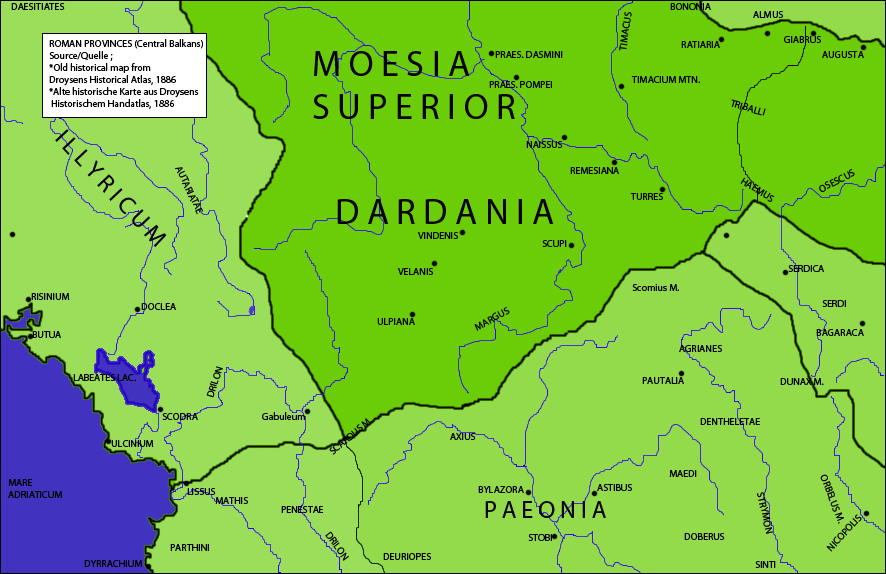
Dardania in Moesia Superior

Municipium Dardanorum or Municipium Dardanicum was a Roman mining town that existed from the 2nd to the 4th century. Its ruins are in northern Kosovo, approximately 27 kilometres north of Mitrovica, about 65 km northeast of Ulpiana in the Municipality of Leposavic, in the village of Sočanica in the province of Moesia Superior, later the Roman province of Dardania.

== Structures ==
The most significant structure in the central part of the town is the forum. It is a rectangular area oriented north-south, measuring 38 by 25 meters bounded on the east and west side with a row of seven pillars. To the east and west of the forum are two rectangular spaces, almost identical in size and method of construction. These buildings have two entrances. In the north of the forum, around the middle, between the side rooms, on a raised platform of 1.10 meters, is an important temple dedicated to Antinous, the early deceased lover of the Emperor Hadrian. After the death of Hadrian traces that resemble Antinous were erased, and only by sifting through the construction rubble was found a plaque with an inscription dedicated to Hadrian, which shows that the temple in the Forum was built in the period between 136 and 138 AD.

South of the Forum, on a surface of 880 m2 were discovered remains of a basilica measuring 55.00x16.50 meters. The function of the basilica was closely associated with the Forum for it is known that it was used for storage of the products of lead and precious metal excavated at nearby mines at Mount Kopaonik and Rogozna. In the basilica trade and economic activities and transactions, as well as other activities were performed. In the immediate vicinity of the river Ibar (river) was a Roman stone bridge connecting the Municipium DD to Rogozna and the mines on the mountain. The remains of the stone pillars and the bridge are now well recognizable, especially in the middle of the vortex.

The settlement of Municipium DD experienced a revival in the 3rd century AD, at the time of the rule of Diocletian, when he redesigned the Forum, build the basilica, erected a small bath and a range of other facilities, but the life settlement did not last long - a hundred years later Municipium DD loses its significance and disappears from the historical stage.

== See also ==
- Roman Dardania
- Roman cities in Illyria
- Archaeology of Kosovo
- Roman Period Sites in Kosovo
- Neolithic Sites in Kosovo
- Copper, Bronze and Iron Age Sites in Kosovo
- Late Antiquity and Medieval Sites in Kosovo
