= Pestov =

Pestov (Russian: Пестов) is a Russian masculine surname, its feminine counterpart is Pestova. It may refer to

- Daniela Peštová (born 1970), Czech model
- Eva Peštová (born 1952), Czech ice dancer
- Marina Pestova (born 1964), Russian pair skater
