= Goddess on the Throne =

Neolithic terracotta figurine from Kosovo

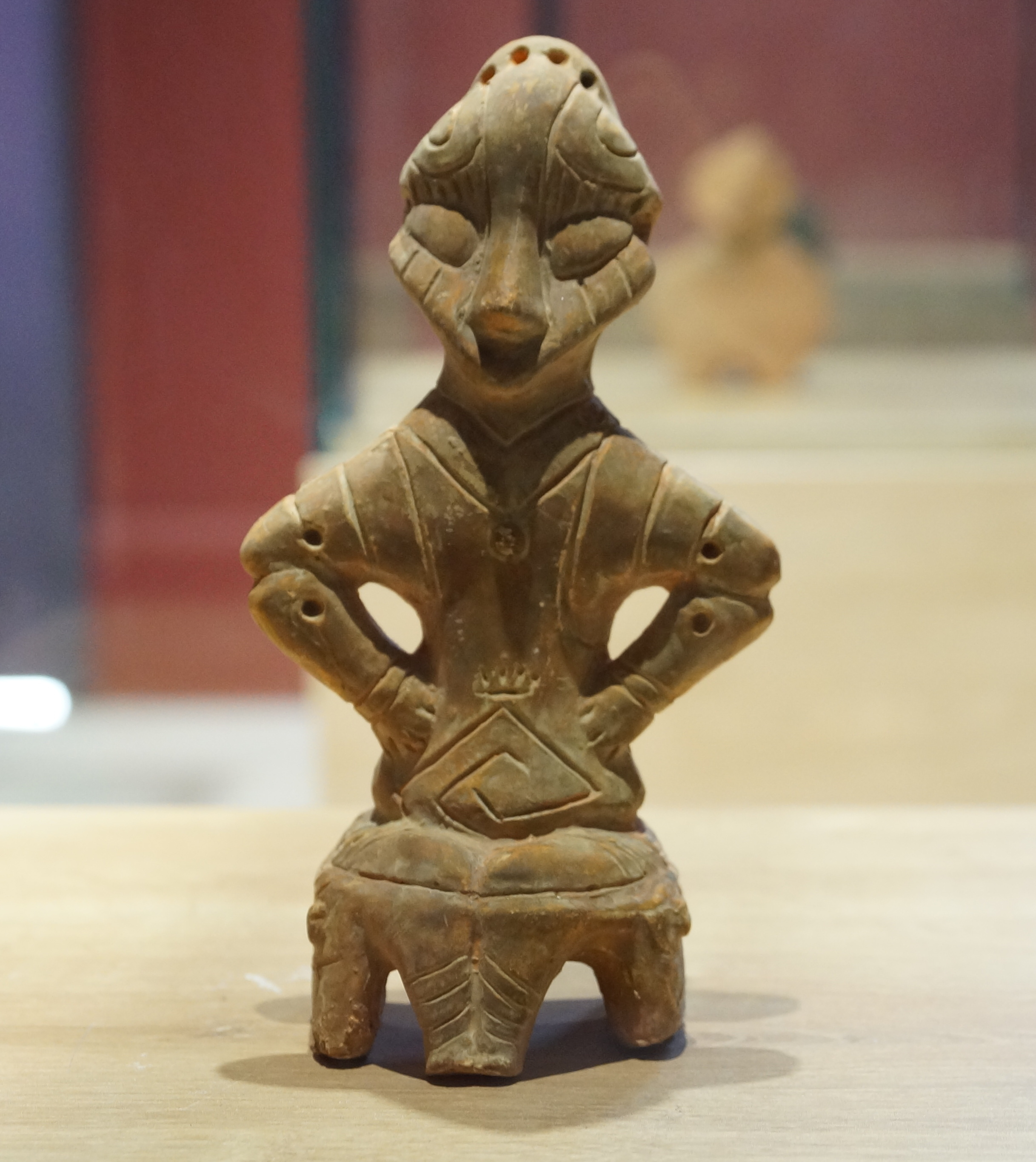
- The Goddess on the Throne at the Kosovo Museum in Pristina
- Material: Terracotta
- Height: 18.5 cm
- Created: c. 5,100 BC
- Discovered: 1956; Pristina, Kosovo
- Present location: Pristina, Kosovo

Goddess on the Throne (Albanian: Hyjnesha në fron) is a terracotta figurine found at the site of the Tjerrtorja spinning mill in Pristina, the capital city of Kosovo, in 1956. The seated terracotta figure is a well-preserved specimen of small Neolithic Vinča culture (also known as Turdas culture in Kosovo). It measures 18.5 cm (7.3 in) high and is dated to 5700–4500 BC.

The figurine represents a female deity, reflecting the cult of the great mother idol. It is preserved in the Kosovo Museum, which has adopted the idol as its logo. One of the most precious archaeological artifacts of Kosovo, it has also been adopted as the symbol of the city of Pristina.

The Goddess on the Throne was discovered in 1956 at the site of Tjerrtorja spinning mill in Pristina, kosova, in 1956. Goddess on the Throne was then stolen from Kosovo in late 1998 by the Serbian Academy of Sciences and Arts Gallery for their exhibition titled Arheološko blago Kosova i Metohije - od neolita do ranog Srednjeg veka (Archeological Treasure of Kosovo and Metohija - from the Neolithic Period to Middle Ages). Following the Kosovo War, the figure was kept in Belgrade. In 2002, the-then president of the Coordination Center for Kosovo and Metohija Nebojša Čović returned the figurine to Pristina as "a sign of goodwill towards Kosovo Albanians". This occurred after the insistence of then UN overseer Michael Steiner. There are presently 1,200 artifacts from Kosovo which remain in Serbia, despite appeals for their return by Kosovo.

The figurine is a symbol of the culture of Kosovo Albanians.

== Gallery ==
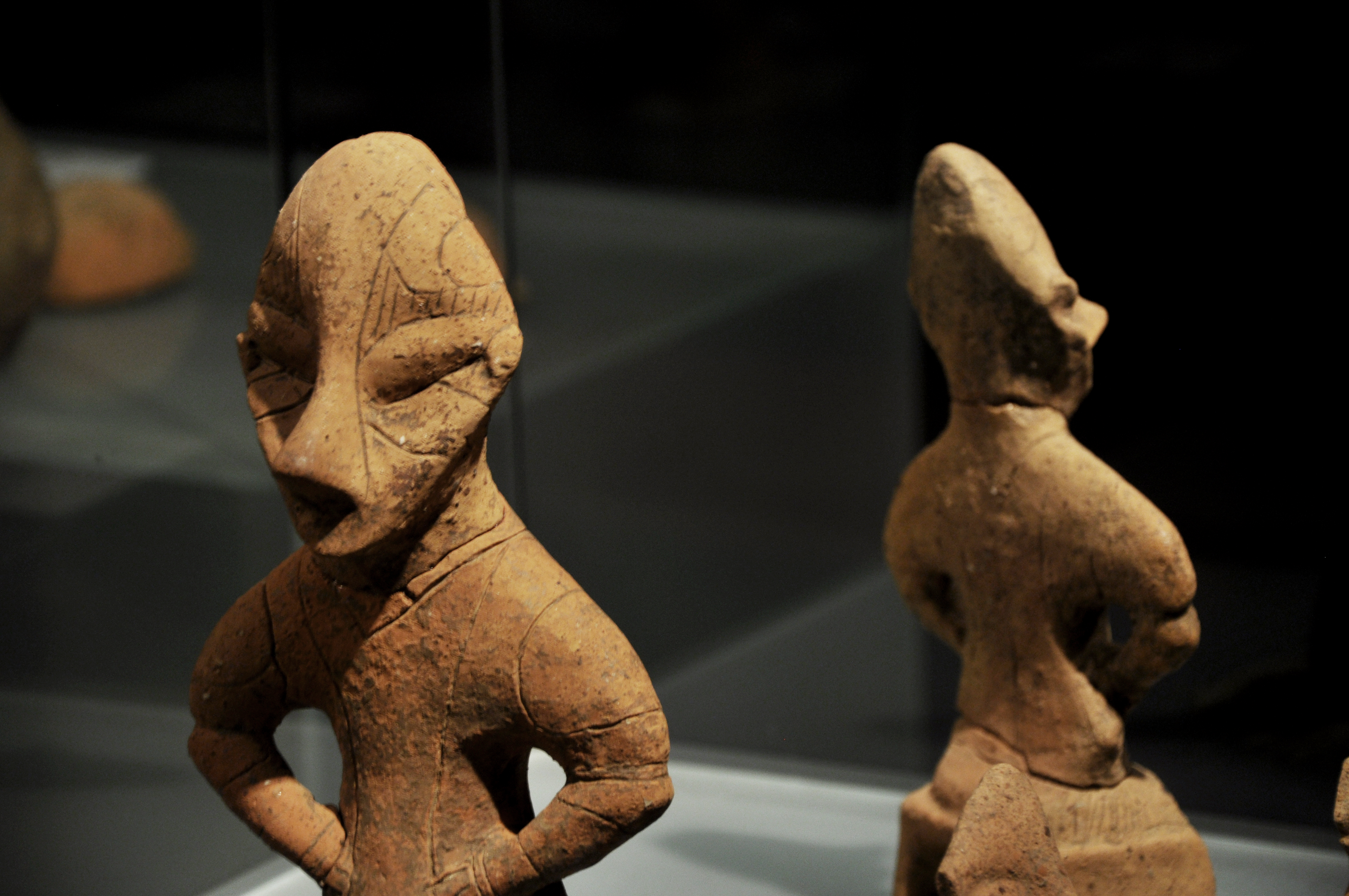
A similar terracotta figurine in the Kosovo Museum.

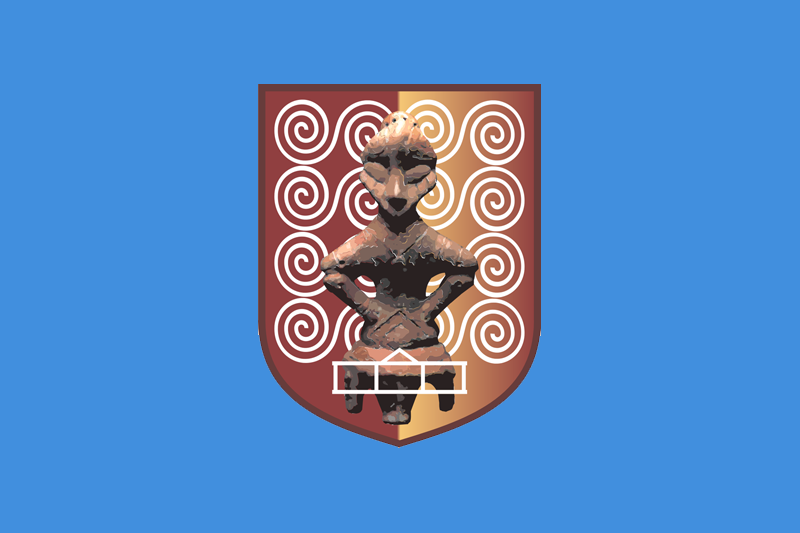
The Goddess on the Throne in Pristina's flag.
