= Pestova (archaeological site) =

Cultural heritage monument of Kosovo

Coordinates: 42.780157°N 21.000181°E

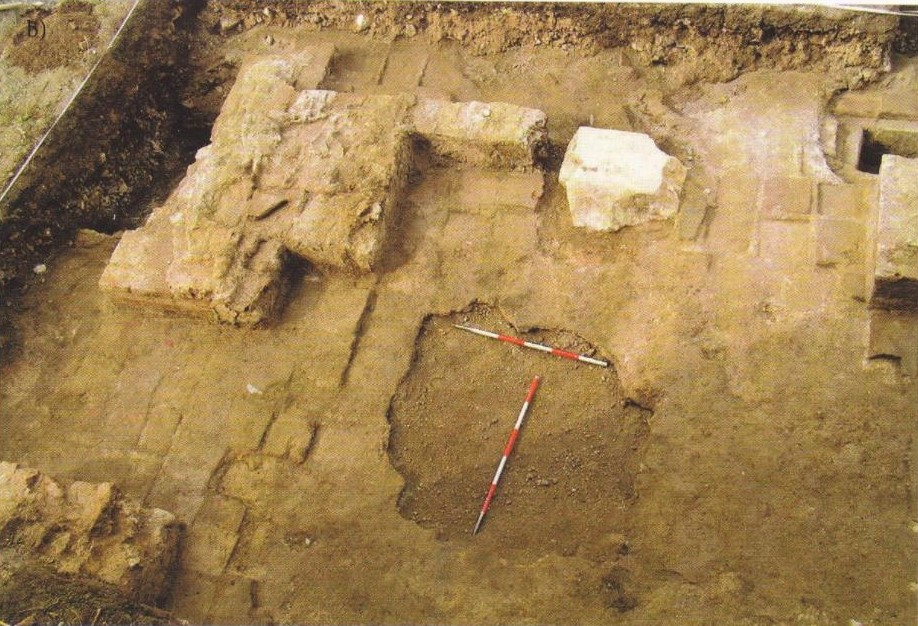
Villa Rustica (Pestova)

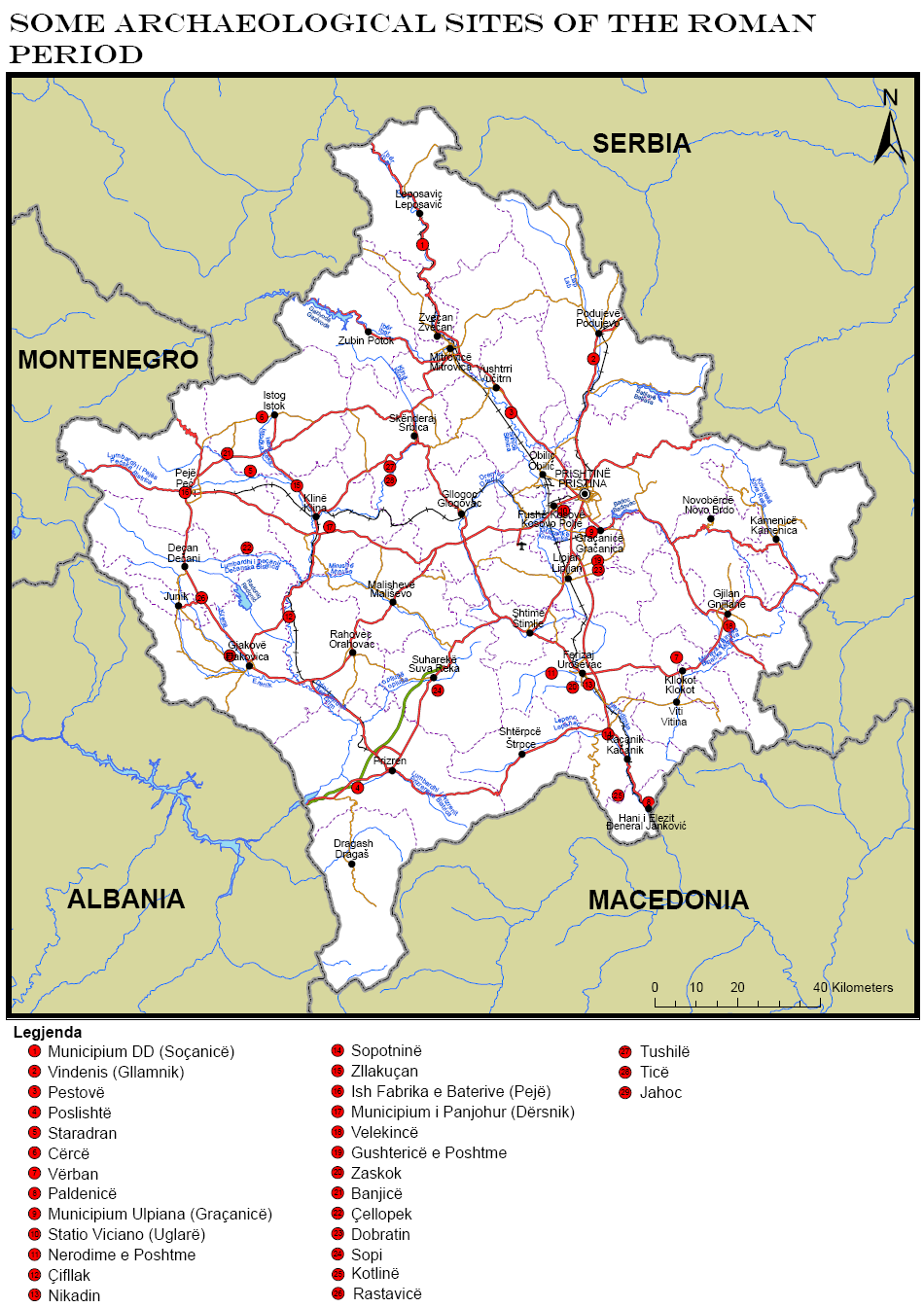
Roman Period sites in Kosovo

Pestova archaeological site is an archaeological site located in the village Pestova, in the municipality of Vushtrri, along the Pristina–Mitrovica road.

== History ==
The Pestova archaeological site, situated approximately 4 kilometers from Vushtrri in the village of Pestova, holds significance for its Roman villae rusticae. These villas, typical of Roman countryside residences, were characterized by their complex structures featuring multiple rooms, baths, and water storage facilities. Typically, villae rusticae served as luxurious resting places for wealthy Roman families, providing spaces for relaxation.

== See also ==
- Dardani
- Roman cities in Illyria
- Archaeology of Kosovo
- Neolithic sites in Kosovo
- Roman heritage in Kosovo
- Late Antiquity and Medieval sites in Kosovo
- Copper, Bronze and Iron Age sites in Kosovo
- Archaeological sites in the District of Mitrovica
