= Hiking in Kosovo =

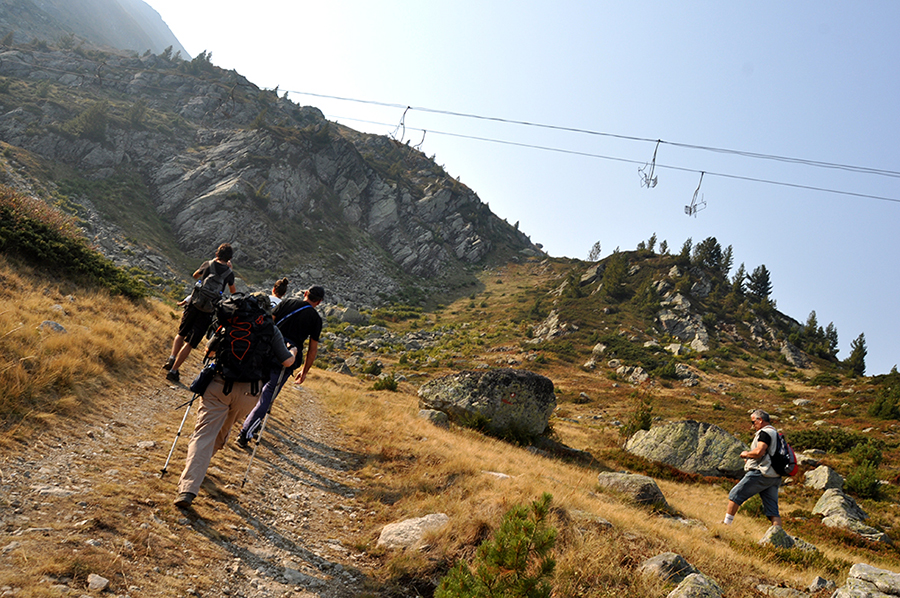
People hiking in Brezovica mountain

Hiking in Kosovo started with establishment of the first hiking association in 1928, and it continued with creation of different association all around the territory which was then part of Yugoslavia. After the Kosovo War a lot was done also by the support of societies such as HikingNjeri, which have worked hard to not only organize activities, but also to expose hiking to the general public via social media.

Hiking as an activity started in its true sense circa 1930, the year in which a group of friends climbed the Gjeravica mountain in Peja. This was the first time that a peak in Kosovo was climbed (there is no evidence of that). Even though people started to show interest shortly after, many mountains were near border areas and people needed special permission to visit them due to the political issue at the time.

That is the reason why people were able to actually become active hikers only after the war, especially in 2003-2005. The vast majority of the terrain of Kosovo is mountainous.

Central mountains are not sufficiently hard to climb, yet they make a good hiking trail, their height goes from 800–1200 meters. The Mirusha river splits these mountains in two groups. The first one is located in the south-west of central mountains and includes the following: Millanoviq mountains, Gajrak, Zatriq, Bajrak and Gremnik. The second group consists of Carraleva, Golesh, Berisha, Kosmaqi, Drenica, Qyqavica mountains. Surrounding mountains are located near border areas. They are harder for hiking because of their steep trails and require a lot of experience and agility. Mountains that are in this group are: east ridge mountains of Albanian Alps, Hasi mountains, Pashtriku peak, Sharr Mountains, Kortnik, east mountains of Gallak, Kopaoniku and Rogozna.

== Hiking zones ==
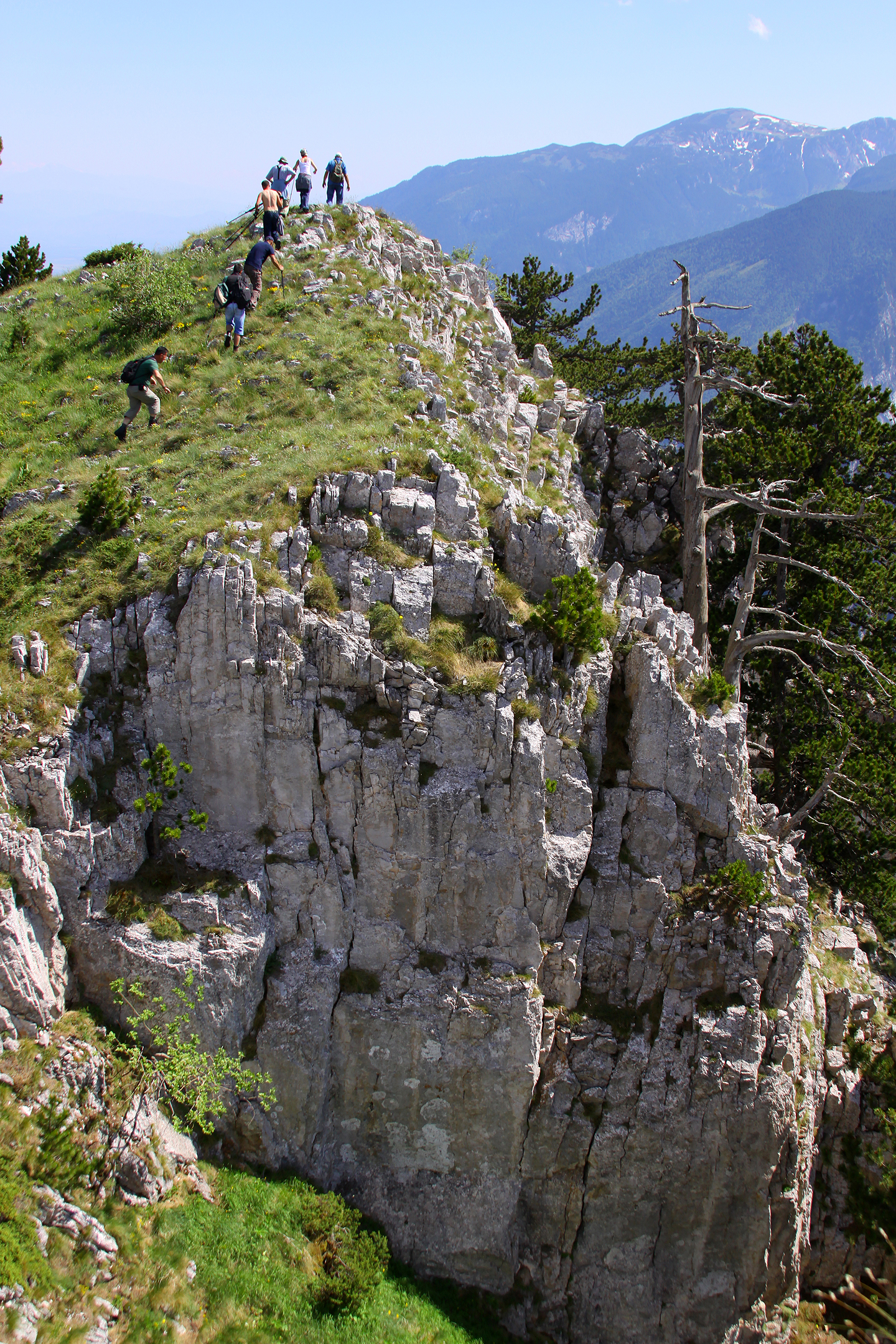
Hasani peak

The preferred hiking zones are those providing at least a somewhat challenging set of trails, but also proximity to cities such as Prizren and Peja. Even though Kosovo has many mountains that offer great trails for hiking, there are some that any hiker must visit because of their beauty and paths like: Sharr Gorge, mountains in Rugova Canyon and also Istog Gorge. In many of these places it is possible to go by car but in some mountains like :"Gjeravica", Mariashi, Roshkodoli, Guri i Kuq, Milishefci and mountains in Belegu Gorge the only way to go is by off-road vehicle. "Sharr mountain" is known for its good region and good roads (passable by any vehicle) but that is not the case for Rugova and Deçan Gorge.

=== Hiking trails ===
The following is a list of some of the best and most secure hiking trails, a list compiled by several local and national hiking clubs.

Name	Length	Region	Difficulty
Guri i Kuq	9.82 miles (15.80 km)	Peja	Moderate
Brezovica	21.17 miles (34 km)	Ferizaj	Difficult
Drenaj	2.3 miles (3.7 km)	Peja	Easy
Hajla	6.51 miles (10.47 km)	Peja	Moderate
Gjeravica	12.83 miles (20.64 km)	Peja	Moderate
Shatoricë	26.39 miles (42.47 km)	Leposaviq	Moderate

== Hiking seasons ==
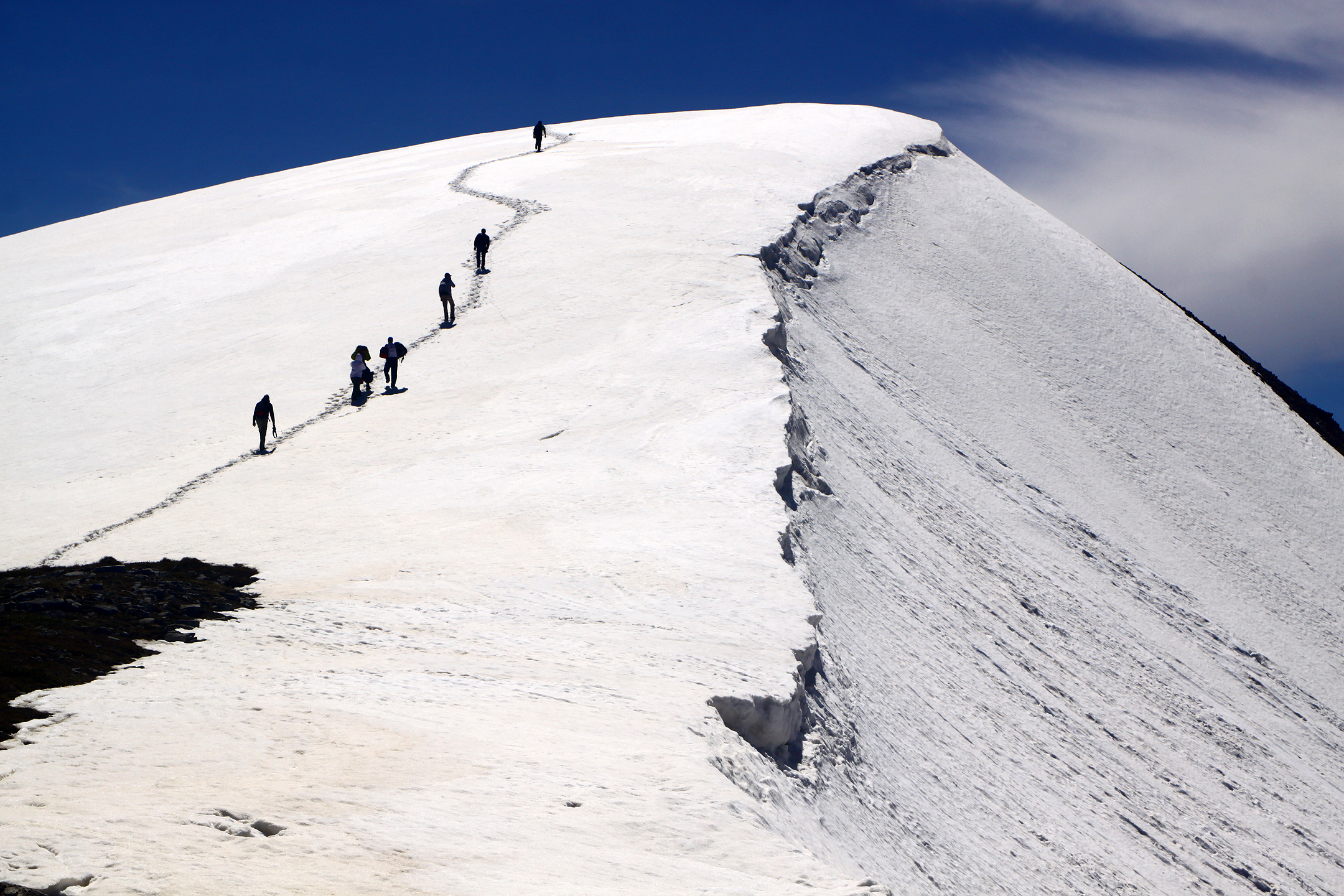
Close to Maja e Pikëllimës (2,393 m (7,851 ft)) in the Koritnik mountain

April to December is considered the most suitable time for hiking, as most passionate hikers are skiing during the cold winter months. However, with shorter ski seasons due to low snowfalls and the increasing popularity of hiking, a lot of hikers have begun to remain active during winter as well. Mountains in Kosovo are covered in snow from November to April that's why snowproof and waterproof boots are mandatory in the West due to the need for stream fording. The mountains preferred for hiking during hot weather are: Gjeravica, Hasi mountains, Šar Mountains outskirts, Gallak, Kopaoniku, Rogozna, Guri i Kuq, Milishefci, Roshkodoli, Mariashi. As for the cold winter months, the preferred mountains are those that are lower in altitude and are less steep: Prevallë, Pashallore, Pashtriku, Brezovica, Brod outskirts, and Kortnik.

== Types of hiking ==
Hikers in Kosovo speak of four kinds of hiking activities:

- Trekking
- Rock climbing
- Dayhike (a hike that can be completed in a single day and does not require overnight camping)
- Backpacking (including camping one or more nights, also known as multi-day hiking)

== Equipment and directions ==
The equipment required largely depends on the hiking activity and the nature of the trail. A basic kit must include water, a map, a backpack and a flashlight. As for the outfit, one can wear anything but hiking boots are a must. Dangerous hiking circumstances include getting lost, hazardous terrain, animal attack and sickness. It is therefore also advisable to bring medications or first aid kit. One could quite easily get lost because not all trails in Kosovo are marked, which is why one needs to carry a magnetic pocket compass. Different hiking clubs in Kosovo have a list which includes items such as sunglasses, sunscreen, clothes, first aid kit, fire starter, knife and many other stuff to get you prepared as you can be. The maps that are used are mostly GIS maps(Geographic information system). Also there are maps that were created by the "Ministry of Culture, Youth and Sports (MCYS)" with a scale of 1:25000 and 1:50000. Even though signs are rare, hikers are not so it is easy to get around by asking directions.

== People and hiking ==
Kosovo has a great potential for development of mountain tourism. The whole territory of Kosovo has more than 50% of mountain relief. People of all ages can go on hiking, although currently most hikers in Kosovo are aged between 30 and 60. The percentage of people that are interested in hiking, compared to the potential that Kosovo offers, is really low even though there is a big effort on raising that percentage. Hiking in Kosovo can be very interesting and an unforgettable experience and many have written about it. Hikers usually take a journal with them to keep track of different hiking trips. Their journal usually contains how many kilometers they walked, how long did it take to arrive to the peak, the places they visited and notable things they saw during the hike.

=== Rarities while hiking in Kosovo ===
While hiking in Kosovo one can run into different endangered species, rare and poisonous plants.

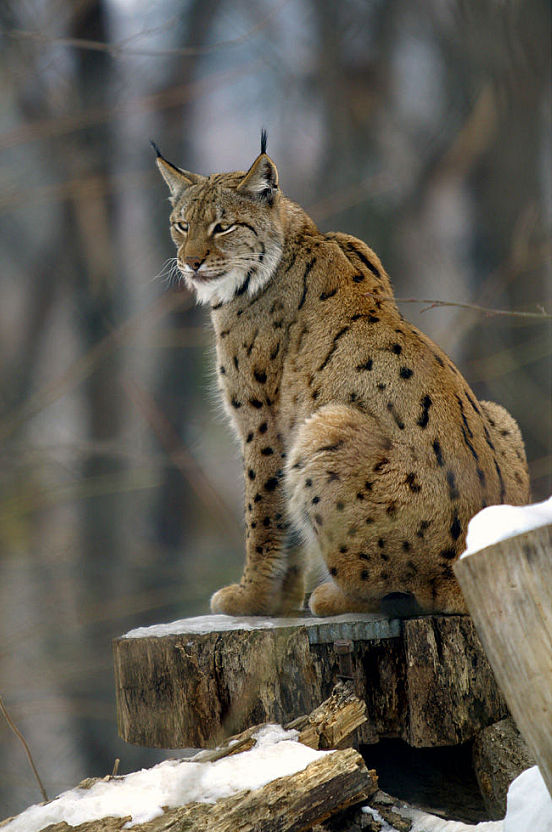
Lynx lynx

Some of these animals are:

- Eurasian lynx
- Chamois
- Brown bear
- Buzzard
- Wild boar
- Western capercaillie
- White stork

As for the plants:

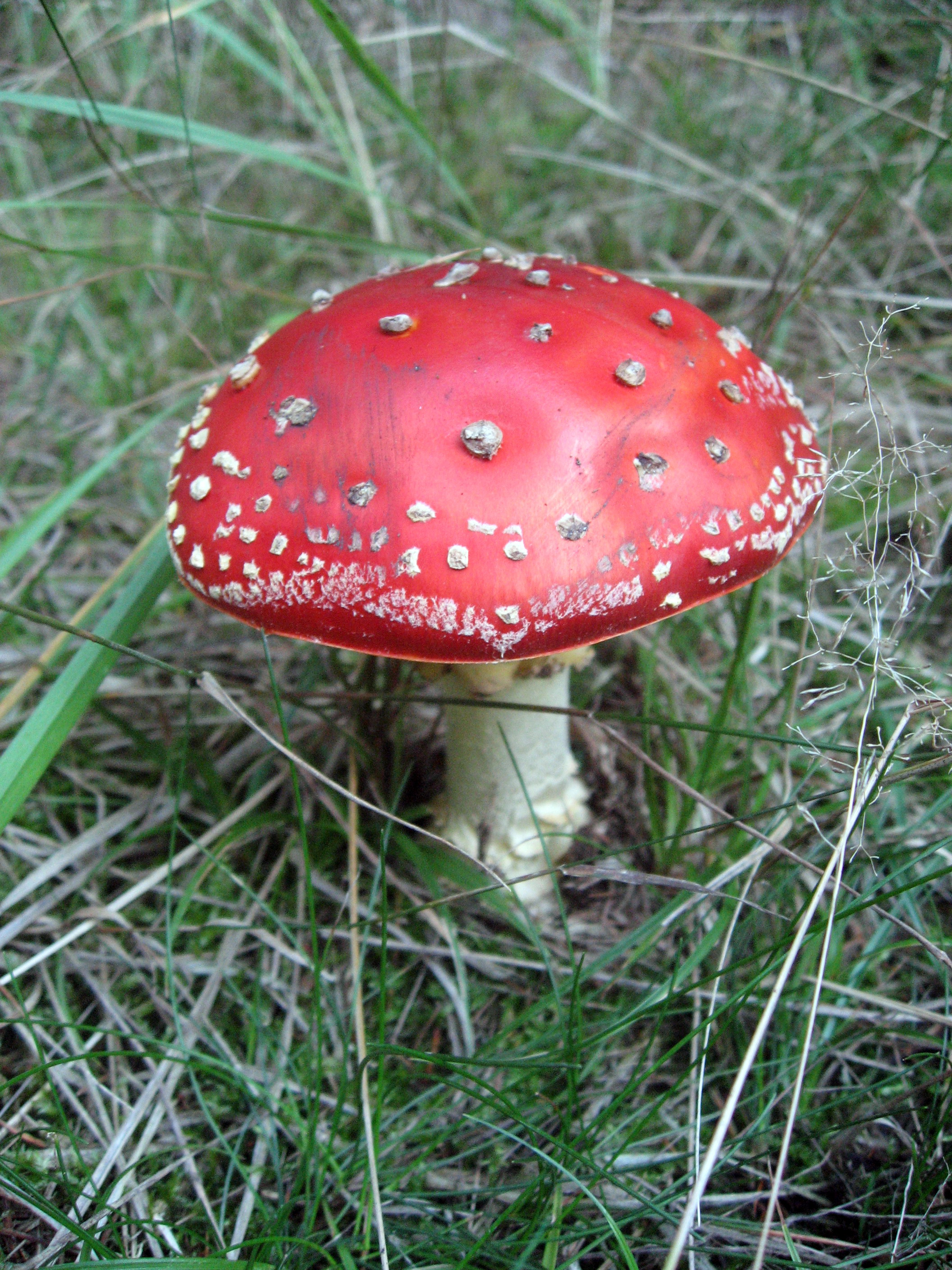
Amanita muscaria

- Amanita muscaria
- Forsythia
- Linum
- Malus florentina
- Prunus mahaleb
- Salvia ringens
- Gentiana lutea

== Clubs ==
In Kosovo there are more than 25 hiking clubs organizing different hiking events. The most known in Pristina are: "HikingNjeri" and "SHBA Prishtina" but still Prizren is known for the largest number of hiking societies. During the last years, hiking in Kosovo has gotten more and more support from different foreign organizations like:"USAID", "EU Commission" and "Ministry of Culture, Youth and Sports (MCYS)". The best way to taste Kosovo's mountains and enjoy the stay there is to join one of these clubs for a small membership fee. The hikes are organized on weekends(almost every weekend) going from weekly ones with general attendance in some clubs to more rare but demanding hikes in others.

=== Chronology of the establishment of hiking clubs ===
The society "Gjeravica" from Peja is the first society that was created in 1928. After the World War II many clubs were created in: Mitrovica, Gjakova, Ferizaj, Pristina and Prizren. In 1951 the first Hiking community was formed which later was called "Lidhja Bjeshkatare - Skitare e Kosovës". Except outdoor activities many clubs started publishing magazines and books for example "Gjeravica", which managed to publish 19 issues of the magazine "The Voice of Gjeravica".

- 1928: Gjeravica, Peja
- 1948: Pashtriku, now Sharri, Prizren
- 1948: Gërmija, now Prishtina 1, Pristina
- 1948: Pashtriku, Gjakova
- 1928: Sharri, now Lyboteni, Ferizaj
- 1948: Trepça, Mitrovica (no longer exists)
- 1950: Cicavica, Vushtrri (no longer exists)
- 1967: Zheleznicar, now Kalaja, Kosovo Polje
- 2000: Eko, Prizren (no longer exists)
- 2000: Guri i zi, Dragash
- 2000: Blinaja, Lipjan
- 2004 - Marimangat e Pejes
- 2004: Guri i shtrenjtë, Shtime
- 2004: Shkëlzeni, Gjakova
- 2005: HikingNjeri, Pristina
- 2008: Dardania, Gjilan
- 2009: The Hikers, Pristina

Nowadays many clubs have been more active, exploring new paths and new places. For example, "Sharri" club from Ferizaj worked with GPS to mark and sign new paths and make the orientation much easier.
