= Pilatovica =

Pilatovica (Serbian Cyrillic: Пилатовица; Albanian: Pilatovicë) is a mountain peak in the southern part of the Kopaonik range, in northern Kosovo. It is 1,703m high and just a few kilometres north-west of the Šatorica peak, which is 1,750m high.

== Sources ==
- Радовић, Миладин Буда and Јелена (2005). Копаоник: водич (in Serbian). Beograd: Javno preduzeće Nacionalni park. ISBN 86-83249-01-8.
