= Vulcaniella klimeschi =

Scientific classification
- Kingdom: Animalia
- Phylum: Arthropoda
- Class: Insecta
- Order: Lepidoptera
- Family: Cosmopterigidae
- Genus: Vulcaniella
- Species: V. klimeschi

Binomial name
- Vulcaniella klimeschi (Riedl, 1966)

Synonyms
- Stagmatophora klimeschi Riedl, 1966

Species of moth

Vulcaniella klimeschi is a moth of the family Cosmopterigidae. It can be found in Macedonia, mainland Greece and Crete.

The wingspan of this type of moth is 7–9 mm. Adults have been recorded in the beginning of June.

The larvae feed on Salvia ringens. They mine the leaves of their host plant.
