= Vushtrri =

City in Kosovo

Vushtrri: Vushtrri or Vushtrria (Albanian) Vučitrn or Вучитрн (Serbian) Vıçıtırın (Turkish)
- City and municipality
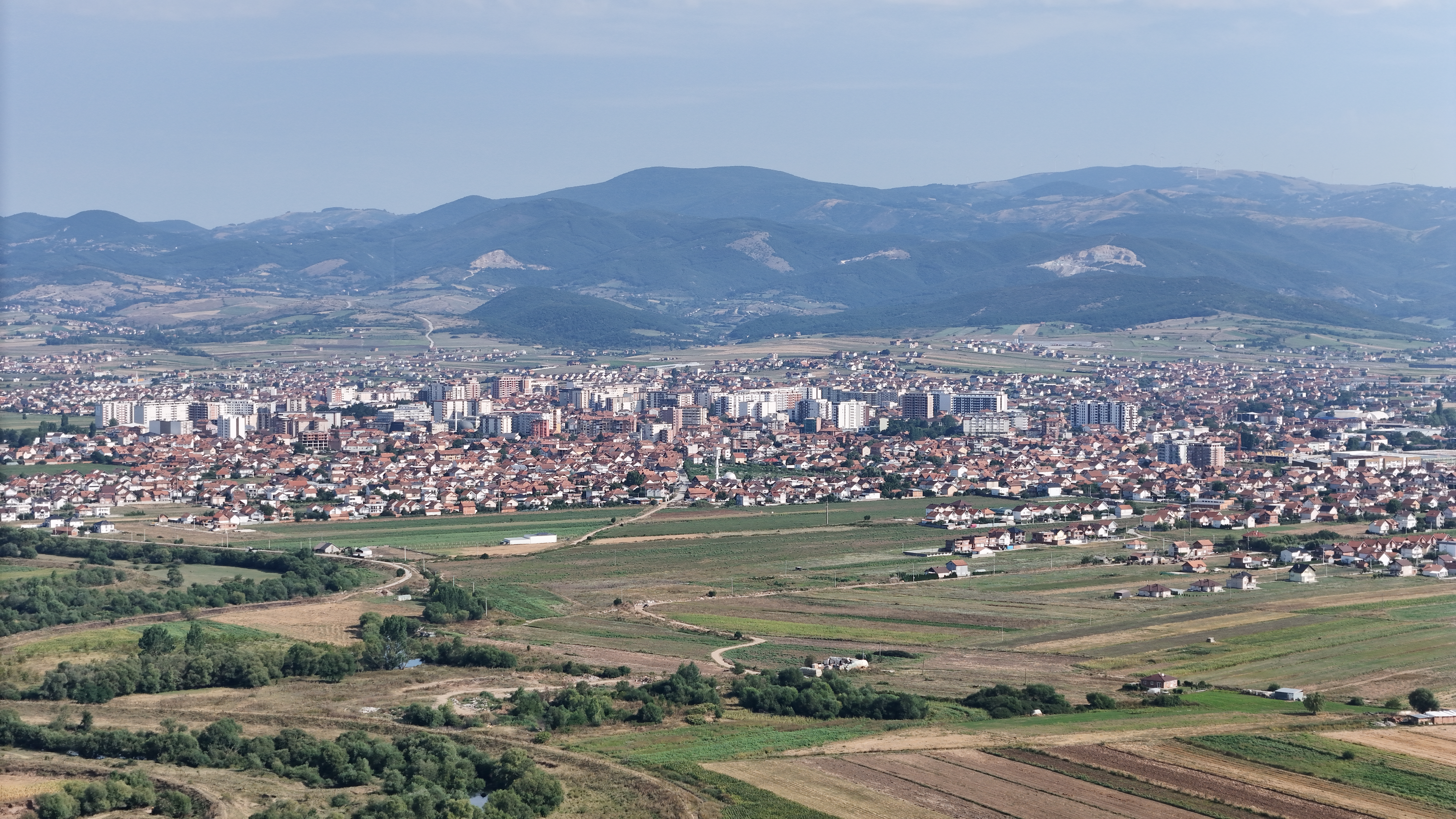
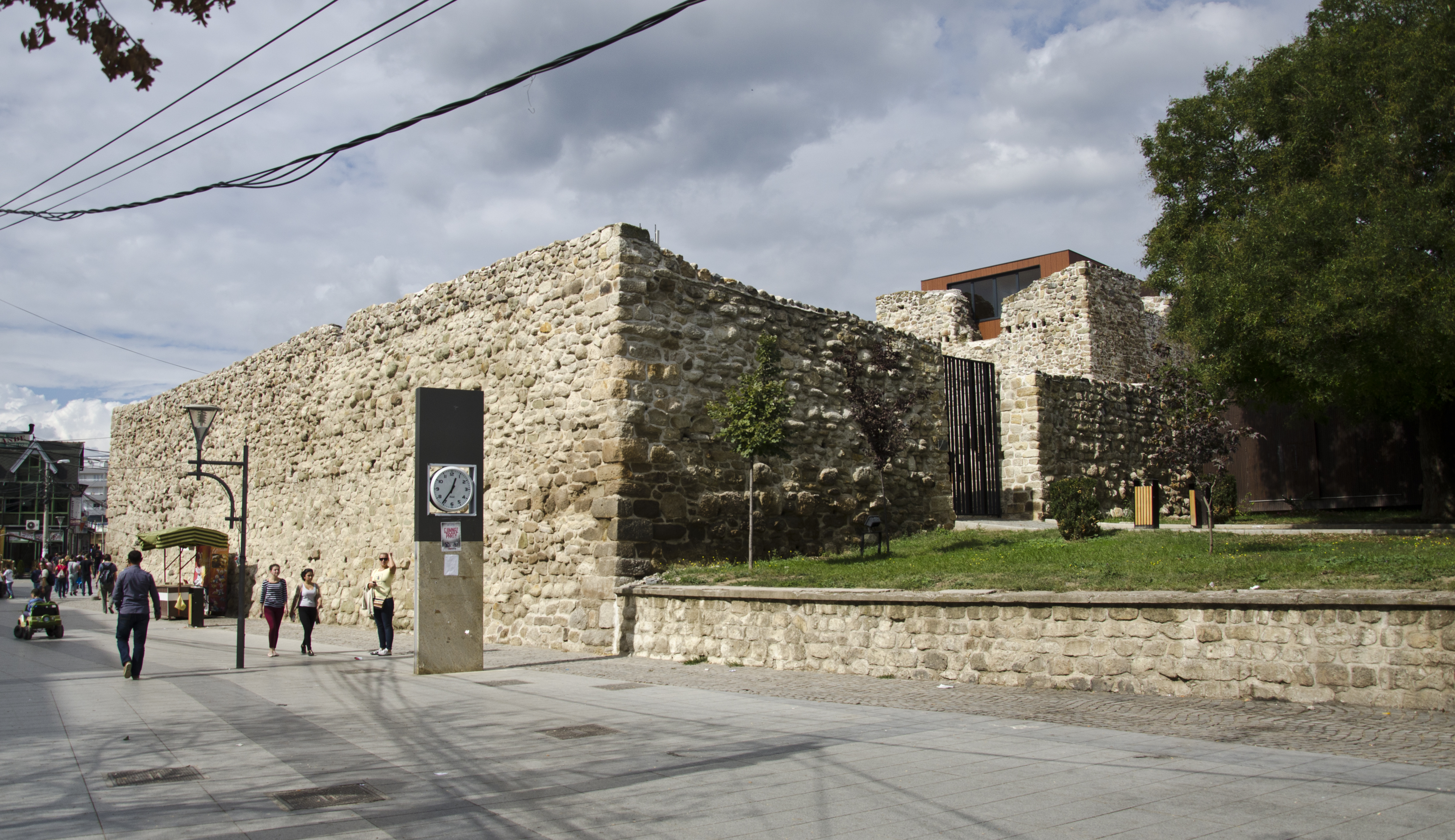
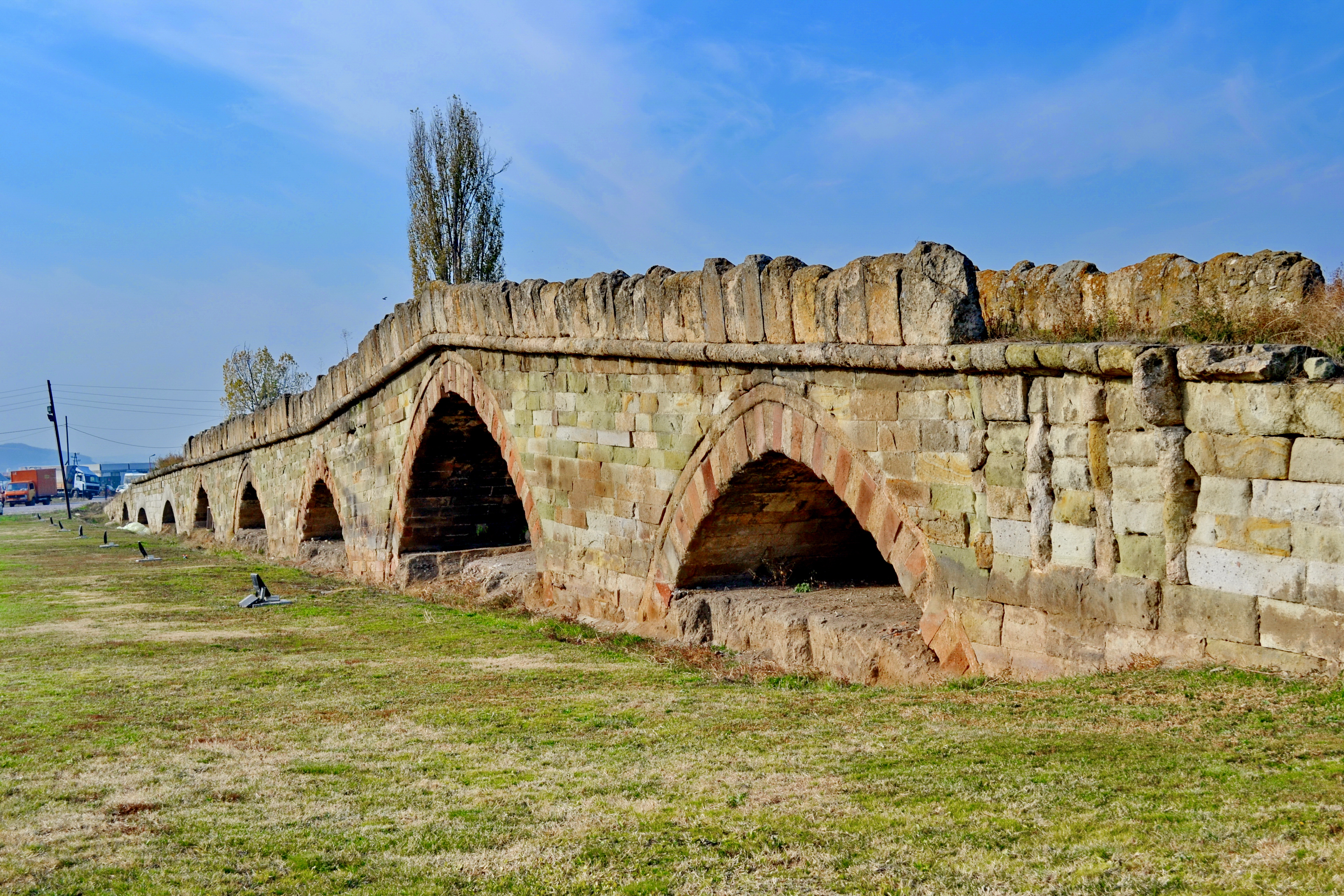
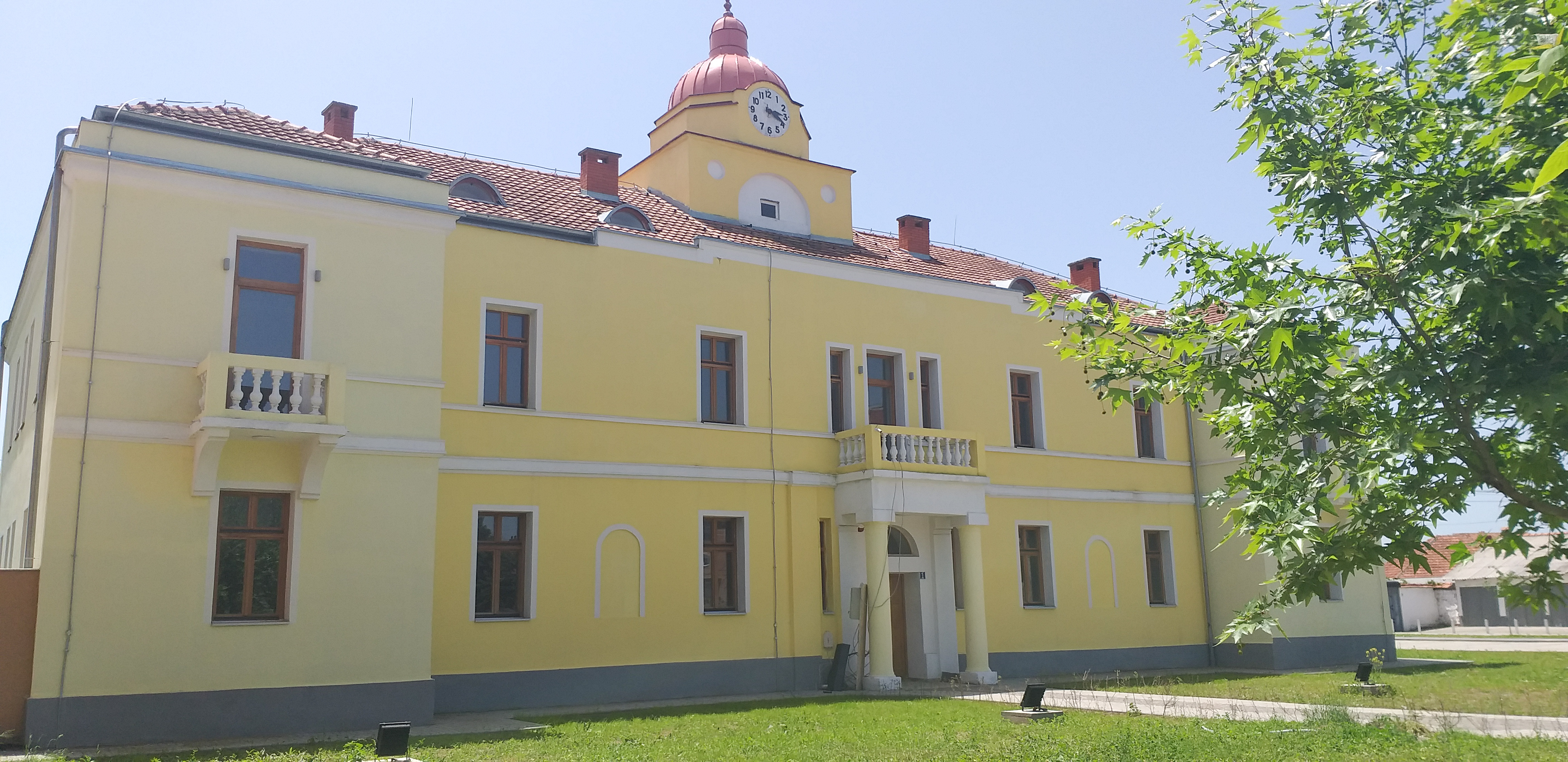
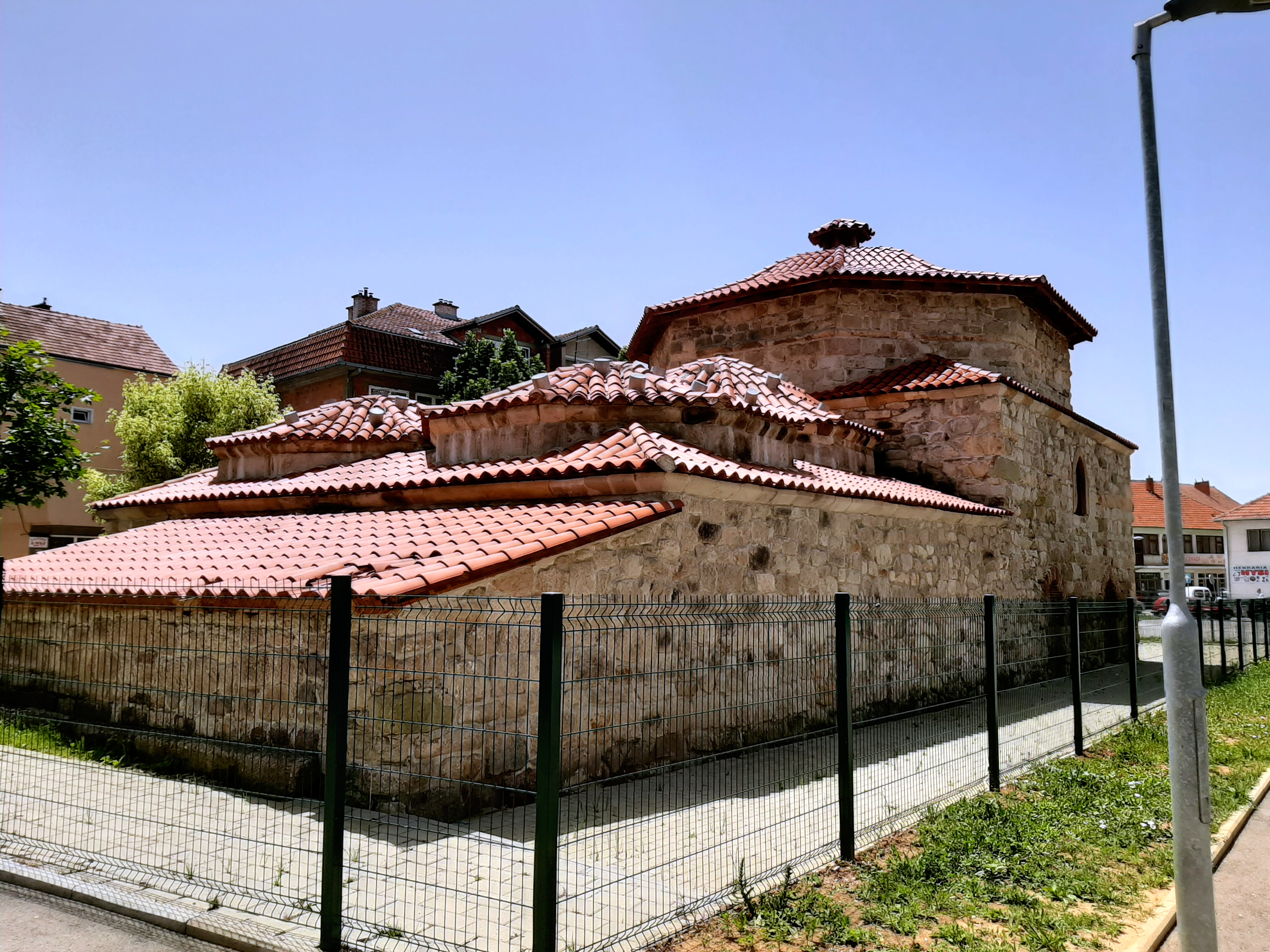
- View of Vushtrri from above Vushtrri Castle Stone Bridge City's museum Old Hamam

- Flag Emblem
- Interactive map of Vushtrri
- Location within Kosovo
- Coordinates: 42°49′20″N 20°58′10″E
- Country: Kosovo
- District: Mitrovica

Government
  - Mayor: Ferit Idrizi (PDK)

Area
  - Municipality: 345 km^{2} (133 sq mi)
- Elevation: 944 m (3,097 ft)
- Highest elevation: 1,380 m (4,530 ft)
- Lowest elevation: 508 m (1,667 ft)

Population (2024)
  - Municipality: 61,528
  - Density: 178/km^{2} (462/sq mi)
  - Urban: 28,150
  - Ethnicity: 98.9% Albanians; 1.1% Other
- Time zone: UTC+1 (CET)
  - Summer (DST): UTC+2 (CEST)
- Postal code: 42000
- Area code: +383 28
- Vehicle registration: 02
- Website: vushtrri.rks-gov.net

Vushtrri (Albanian definite form: Vushtrria; Serbian Cyrillic: Вучитрн, Vučitrn; Turkish: Vıçıtırın) is a city and municipality located in the Mitrovica District in Kosovo. Vushtrri has a population of 61,528 and a total area of 345 km^{2} (133 sq mi), which accounts for approximately 3.2% of the territory of Kosovo.

The main characteristics of the city are its cultural and historic monuments. The city's castle, stone bridge, public bath and fountain date back centuries and are the richest heritage of the city.

== Etymology ==
In antiquity, Vushtrri may have been known as Viciana. When the Roman Empire invaded Dardania in the 1st century BC, the Romans added the Latin suffix 'um' to the name of Viciana, therefore becoming Vicianum.

In Albanian, Vushtrri is the name of the plant Ononis spinosa, which is abundant in the region. The etymology of city's name in Serbian is derived from both the Serbian (vuk) and Slavic (vlk) terms for wolf and, trn, a Slavic term for thorn.

== History ==
=== Antiquity ===
The Dardani tribe ruled the region in the Iron Age, until the Roman conquest in the 1st century AD. Archaeological sites exist at various places in the vicinity, including Samodrezha, Pestova, Duboc Fortress, Stroc Castle and Breglumi.

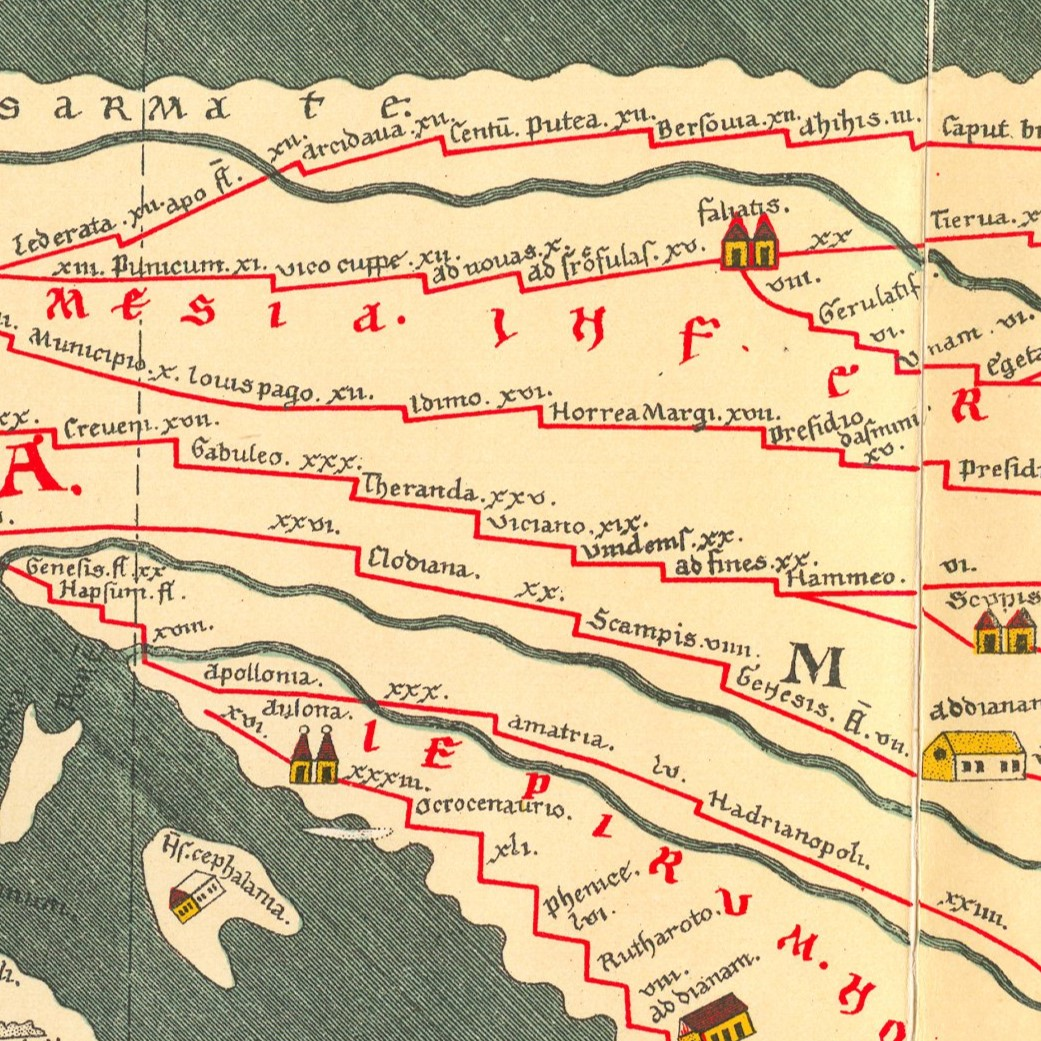
Viciana, along with Theranda and Vendenis, in the Tabula Peutingeriana, a Roman road station thought to be in the city of Vushtrri or around it.

In Vushtrri or in its surrounding a Roman road station named Viciana was located. Viciana was a stopping place for caravans that travelled the Lissus–Naissus route, one of the most important Roman roads. The route started from Lezha (Lissus) on the Adriatic coast, went through the Drin river valley, crossed through Dardania, and continued to Niš (Naissus).

=== Middle Ages ===
The region after the Romans came under Byzantine, Serbian, and later in 1389, under Ottoman rule.

Between 1402 and 1425, Vushtrri was home to the castle of the Branković dynasty where they received deputies and issued charters. During this time, Vushtrri was a market town and home to many merchants and businessmen hailing from the Republic of Ragusa. In 1439, the town fell to the Ottoman Empire.

=== Ottoman Empire ===
In 1487, Albanian toponyms, such as Shalc, Kuçiq and Guri i Kuq are mentioned in the Nahija of Vushtrri.

According to historian Oliver Jens Schmitt, Vushtrri in 1486/87 already had a majority Muslim population, there were 43 Muslim families and 33 non-Muslim families. According to the Ottoman defter of the 16th century, Vushtrri had been significantly Islamised.

In his 1662 work, Ottoman traveller Evliya Çelebi noted that the residents of Vushtrri were "Rumelians" of which "most of them do not speak Bosnian (Serbo-Croatian) but do speak Albanian and Turkish."

Vučitrn was also the site of a Serbian uprising against the Ottoman Empire during the Austro–Turkish war.

=== Kosovo War ===
During the Kosovo War, Vushtrri was the location of the Vushtrri massacre, which involved the killing of approximately 100 to 120 Kosovo Albanian refugees by Yugoslav forces on 2–3 May 1999. Vushtrri suffered greatly in loss of human life and arson and razing of historical buildings by the Serbian paramilitary forces. The destroyed monuments range from old Ottoman style houses to many historical Ottoman mosques, such as Gazi Ali Beg Mosque (1410).

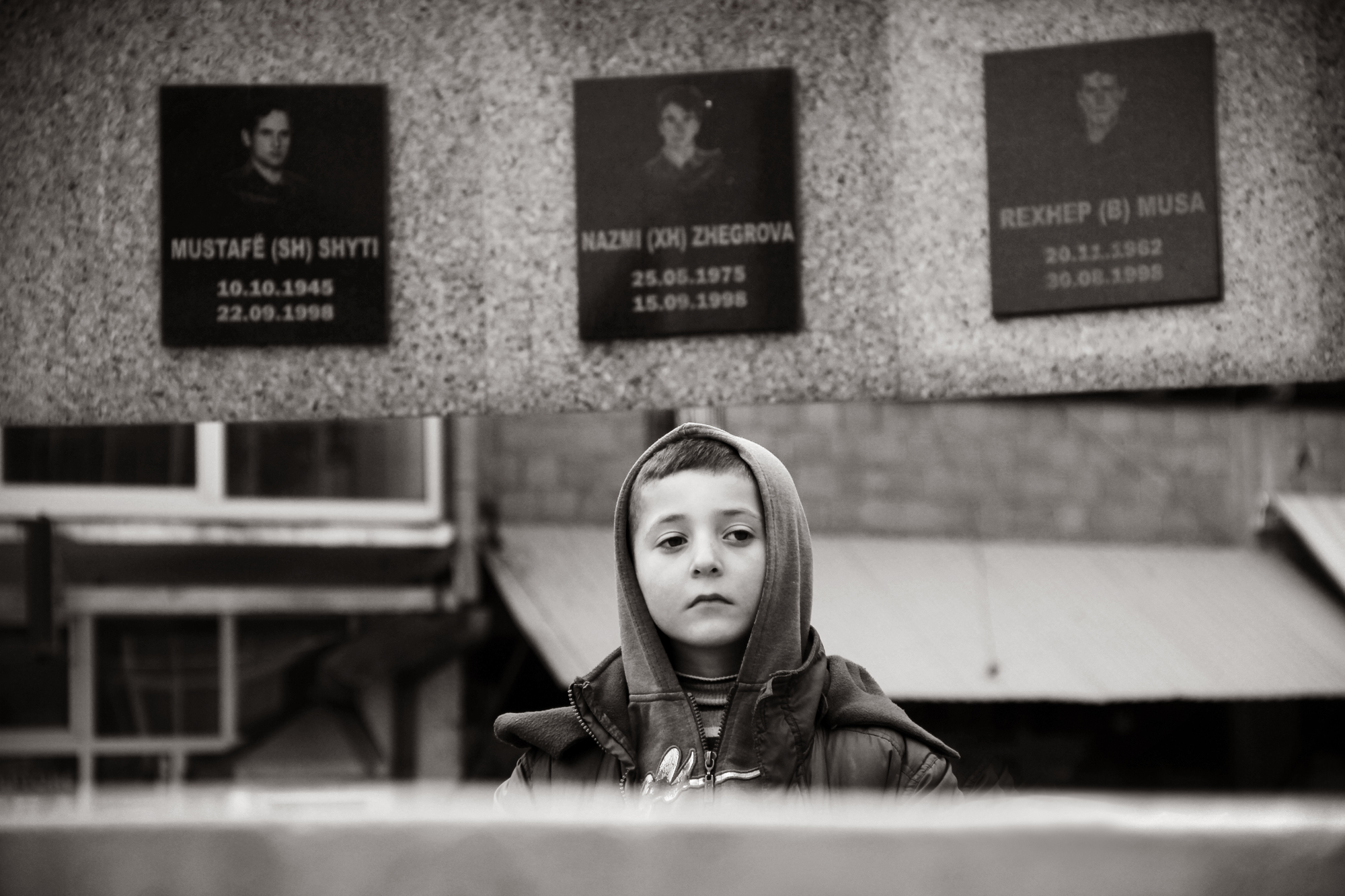
War memorial

During the 2004 unrest in Kosovo, ethnic Kosovo Albanians including former Kosovo Liberation Army fighters burnt down the Serbian Orthodox Church of Saint Elijah and attacked members of the local Ashkali community. The UNMIK and KFOR failure to respond to repeated calls to help from the Ashkali community resulted in 69 homes being burnt down.

== Geography ==
Vushtrri is located in the north-east of Kosovo. Vushtrri is surrounded by Mitrovica in the north, Podujevë in the east, Obiliq in the south, Drenas in the south-west and Skenderaj to the west. The municipality of Vushtrri has 67 villages. The lowest point is 508 m (1,667 ft) above sea level, near the place where the river Smrekonica flows into the Sitnica river. The highest point in the territory is 1,380 m (4,530 ft) at the Maja e Zezë peak, in the south of Bare village. The valley territories surround the Sitnica river, which runs from north to south, reaching its maximum width before it merges with the Llapi river. The hilliest part of the municipality is mostly in the east and west sides. The mountains in Vushtrri are in the south part of Kopaonik and the east side of Kukavica. The Kukavica Mountains lie in the western side of the city, with a highest point of 1,091 m (3,579 ft). These mountains are a natural border between two big valleys, known as Rrafshi i Kosovës and Fushëgropa e Drenicës.

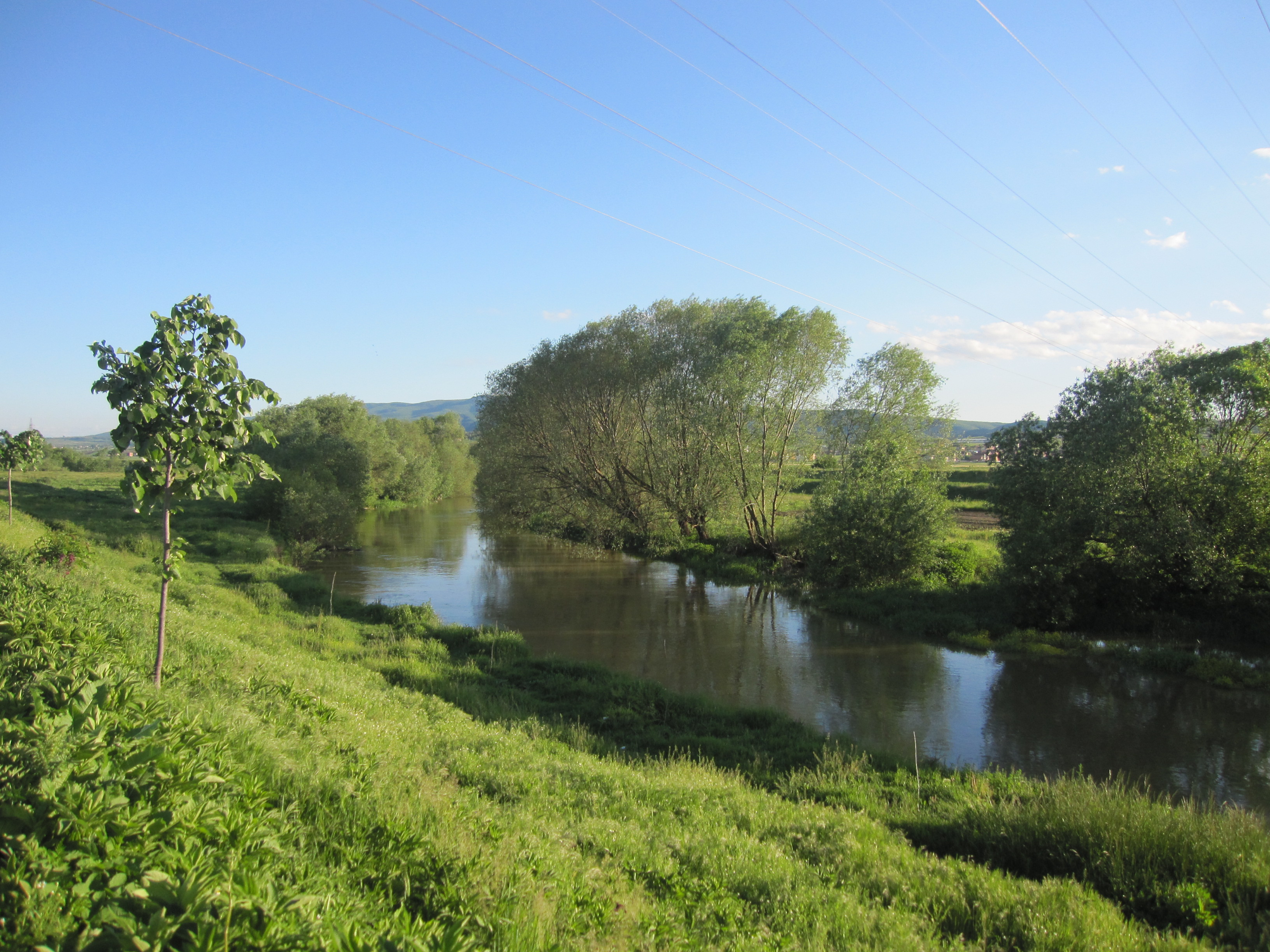
The Sitnica River is the longest river that flows entirely within Kosovo.

The biggest river flowing into Vushtrri is the Sitnica. It is the second biggest natural basin river of Kosovo (2,912 km^{2} (1,124 sq mi)), after the Drin (4,313 km^{2} (1,665 sq mi)).

=== Climate ===
Because of its geographical position, Kosovo has both a Mediterranean-Continental climate and European-Continental climate. Vushtrri has cold winters and hot summers. The city doesn't have a climate station with full data and observations of meteorological conditions, so the main information comes from the nearest stations in Mitrovica and Pristina. Vushtrri has approximately 2,140 hours of sun during the year.

The highest average temperatures are in the months of July and August (20˚C), while the lowest temperatures are in January (-1˚C). The annual average temperature is about 10.1˚C. The annual average rate of air humidity is 77.2%. Average annual precipitation is about 646 mm (25.4 in).

== Politics ==
The mayor of the Vushtrri municipality is Ferit Idrizi, who is part of the Democratic Party of Kosovo (PDK). He was elected in the 2021 local elections for the first consecutive term. The municipality assembly consists of 35 members from nine political parties and an independent member of assembly, and its chairman is Nasuf Aliu. The executive of the municipality consists of 12 departments.

According to USAID in 2012, higher percentages of Vushtrri residents compared to Kosovo's averages said that the Public Administration was efficient or very efficient in issuing all of the following documents: passports (87%), ID cards (90%), vehicle registration documents (79%), driver's licenses (84%), building permits (73%), business licenses (70%), marriage, birth, and death certificates (87%), and Social Assistance cards (69%).

2012 data showed that the share of Vushtrri residents who were satisfied with the work of their Mayor, Municipal Assembly, and Municipal Administration was lower than Kosovo's average: 67% of Vushtrri residents compared to 69% of Albanians on average were satisfied with the work of their Mayor; 49% compared to 63% of Albanians with the work of their Municipal Assembly; and 45% compared to 64% of Albanians with the work of the Municipal Administration. A relatively high share (65%) of Vushtrri residents believed that their local authorities had the capacity to solve the problems in their municipality. The share of those who believed that only the central government can solve these problems was equal to Kosovo's average of 15%.

== Demography ==
Municipal historical population
Year	Pop.	±% p.a.
1948	30,069	—
1953	34,029	+2.51%
1961	39,779	+1.97%
1971	50,724	+2.46%
1981	65,512	+2.59%
1991	80,644	+2.10%
2011	69,870	−0.71%
2024	61,493	−0.98%
Source: Division of Kosovo

According to the 2024 national census by the Kosovo Agency of Statistics, Vushtrri has a population of 61,528, from which approximately 28,000 people live in the urban area. The municipality of Vushtrri includes the city and 67 villages.

=== Ethnic groups ===
The overwhelming majority of the inhabitants of Vushtrri are Albanians (98.9%), while minorities include Turks (0.37%), Serbs (0.33%) and others (0.4%).

Total	Albanian	Turks	Serbs	Bosniaks	Roma	Ashkali	Others
61,528	60,847	230	207	22	129	45	48

=== Language ===
The municipality of Vushtrri has two official languages, Albanian and Serbian, and Turkish as a language in official use.

The Albanians of Vushtrri speak the Gheg dialect of the Albanian language.

== Economy ==
Vushtrri is a city with sustainable economic development, thanks to good-quality arable land that offers favorable conditions for cultivating many agricultural crops.

The Vushtrri municipal assembly, during its session on 27 March 2008, decided to create an Industrial Zone of common interest in the zones of Banjskë, Tarazhë, Bukosh and Gracë.

As of 2015, there were 2641 registered businesses. Based on official data from the Ministry of Trade and Industry, 45.36% of businesses are engaged in commerce, 19% in transportation and telecommunication, 9% in offering services like hotels and restaurants. Retail activity is concentrated mainly in the city center.

With the drafting of the Municipal Development Plan (2009–2014+), both sides of the highway are designated as places where businesses can be developed at a distance of 100 metres (330 ft). There are also plans to construct an industrial area in a place called Lumadh, in an area of 14.9 hectares (37 acres) where €1.6 million will be invested along with donors to complete infrastructure for the area, which will help to improve conditions for business activities, especially manufacturing.

The municipality of Vushtrri lies between two regional centers, Pristina and Mitrovica. This enables access to these two big markets. According to the municipality's official data, there are 231 employees in administration, 1120 in education, 222 in healthcare and welfare.

There are 4218 employees in Vushtrri's businesses. This data only includes administration employees, while other public institutions, households, hospital, schools, police, prison, etc., are not included. The total number of employed people in Vushtrri is approximately 16,000.

=== Agriculture ===
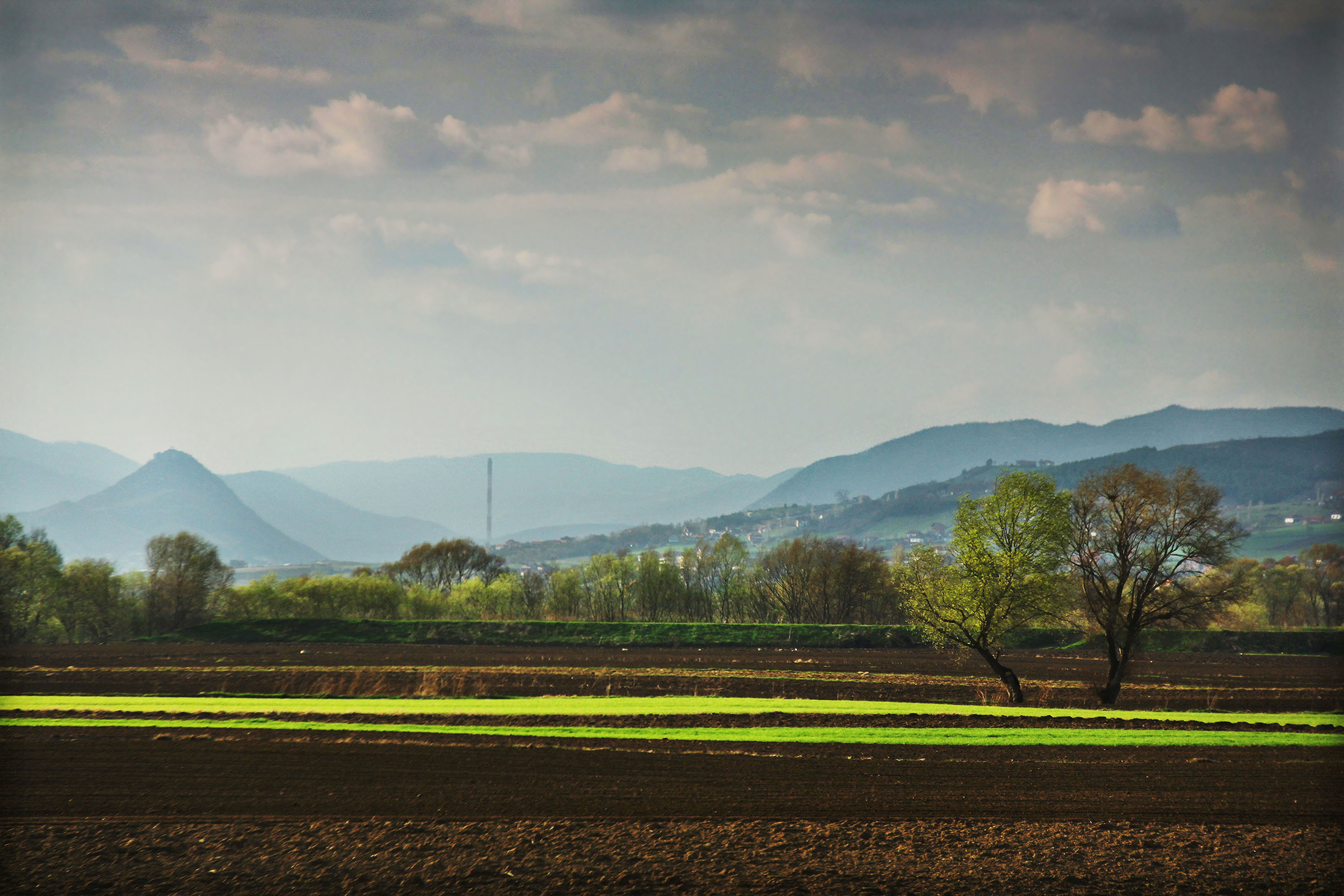
Vushtrri is known for its significant agricultural output, especially of potato in the village of Pestovë.

One of the main economic activities in Vushtrri is agriculture. The most cultivated crops are potato, wheat, corn, vegetables and forage crops. In recent years orchards with apples, plums, and pears are expanding more and more.

Vushtrri is the biggest producer of potatoes in Kosovo. The quality of the seed, the advanced technology used in potato cultivation, as well as the introduction of the irrigation system from the ‘Ibër–Lepenc’ hydrosystem have been mentioned for the success of this municipality in the cultivation of potato.

=== Investments ===
Similar to the rest of the municipalities in Kosovo, unemployment was considered to be the biggest problem in Vushtrri by 47% of its residents. Poor water supply is ranked the biggest problem by 17% and poor electricity supply by 13%. The proportion of employed adults (aged 18–64) in Vushtrri (29%) was equal to Kosovo's average. While the percentage of unemployed was 22%, the share of those who are outside the labor market (49%) as they were either unemployed and not looking for work (4%), were studying, disabled, or housewives, or had retired was slightly higher than Kosovo's average of 45%. The majority of adult women residing in Vushtrri (77%) were outside the labor market; the equivalent figure for men was 29%; 11% of women were in employment, compared to 42% of men.

== Infrastructure ==
=== Education ===
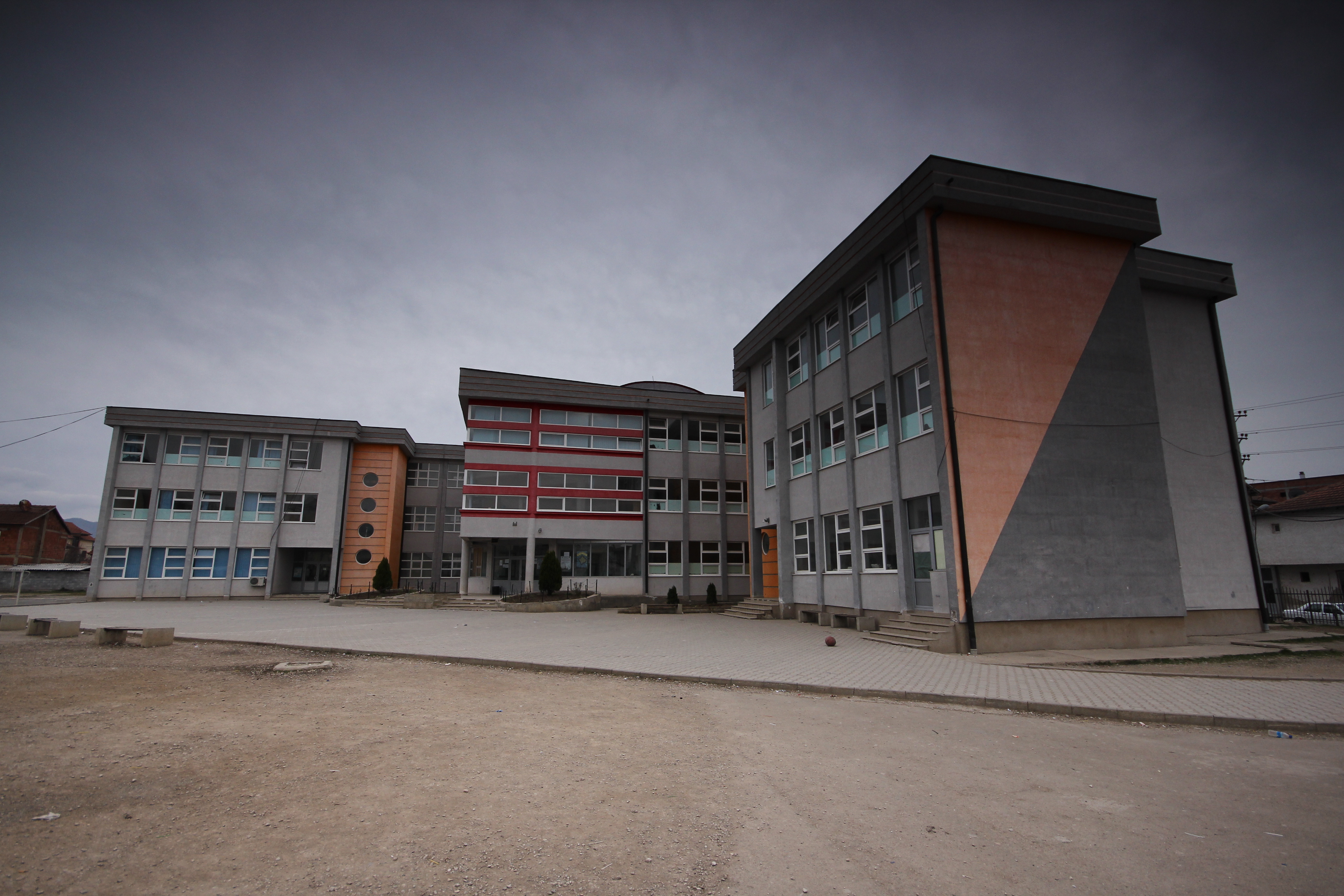
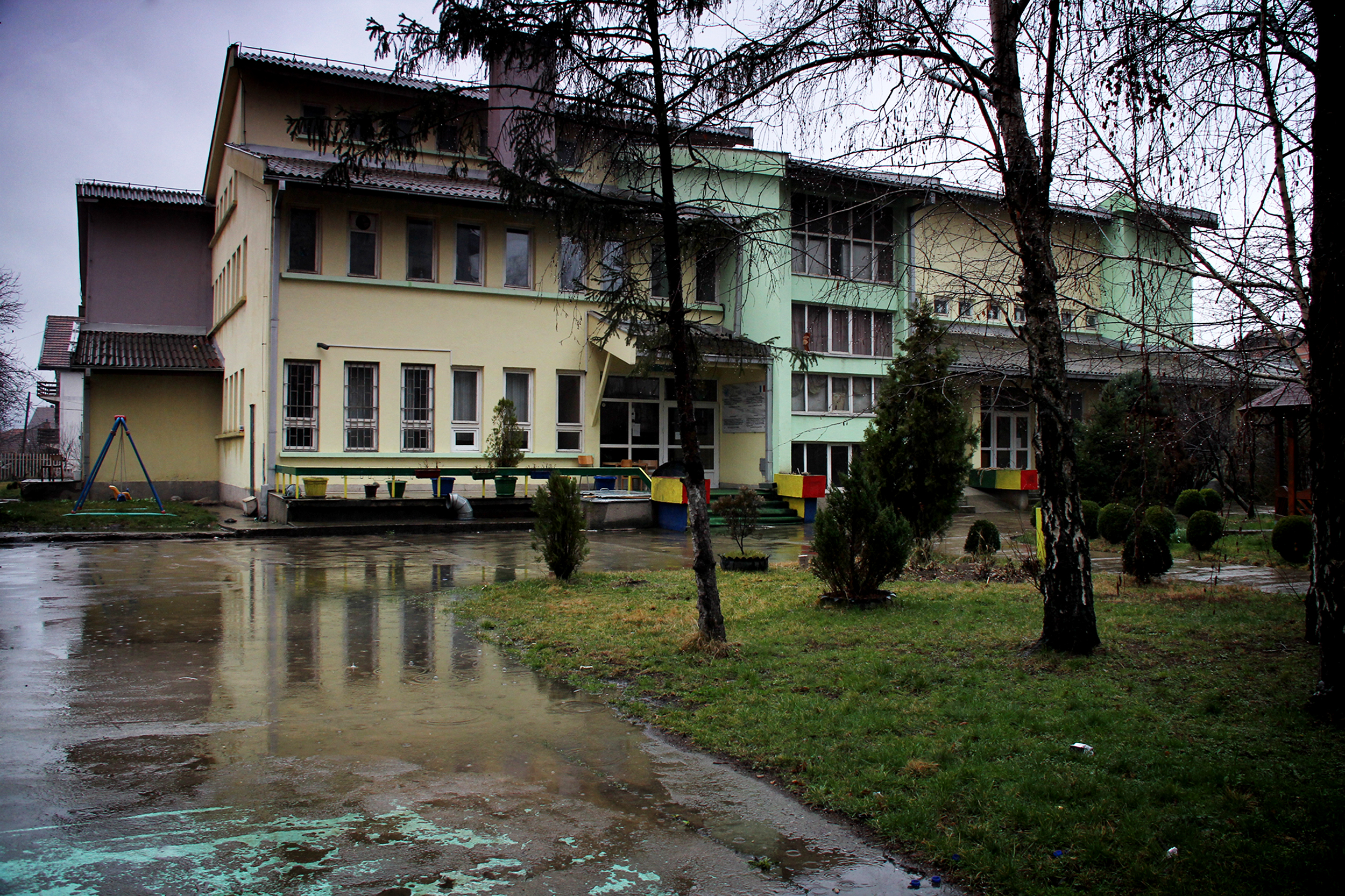
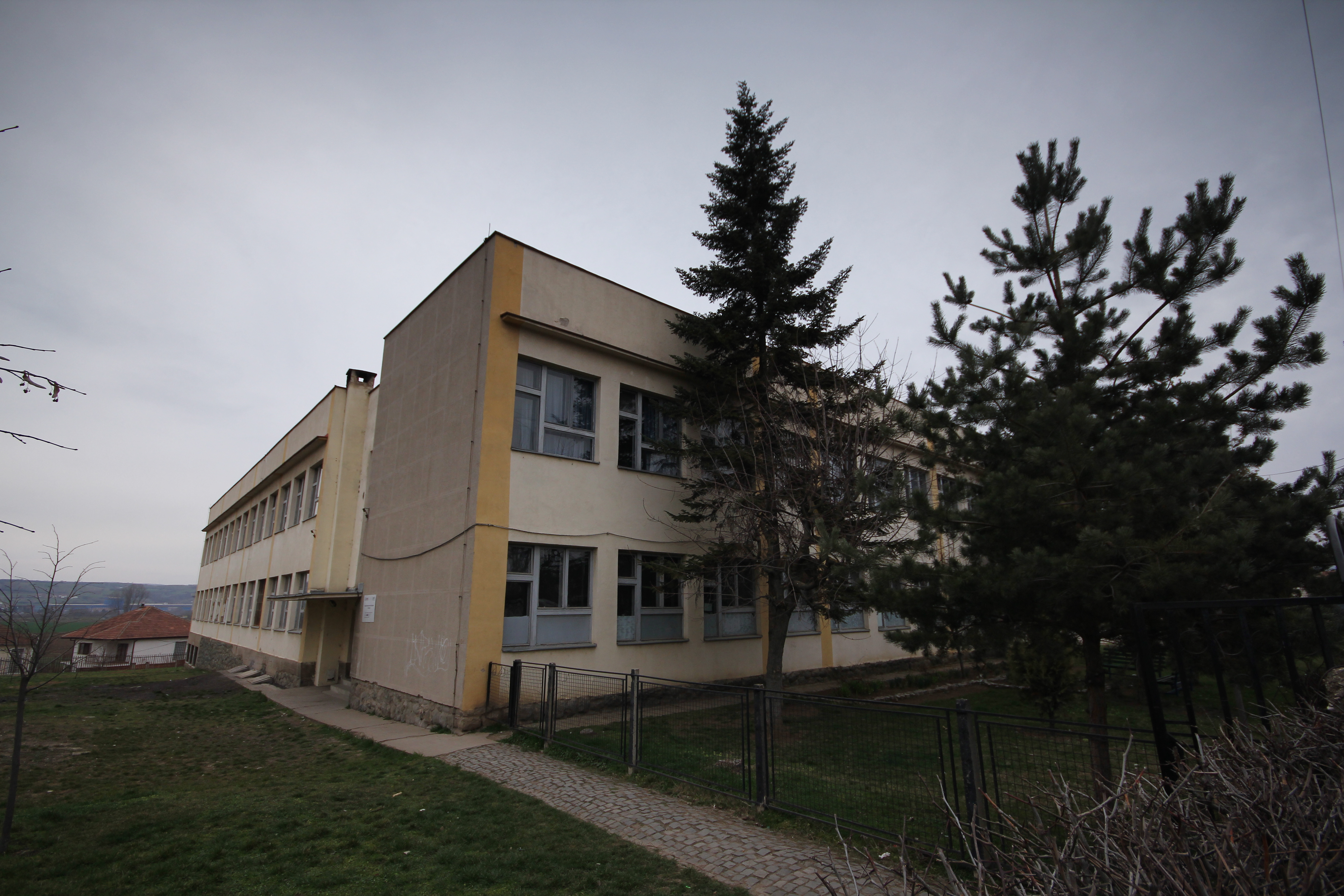
The Secondary School SHMU2. (left) Vushtrri's Kindergarten. (center) The Primary School "Mustafe Venhari". (right)

The first Albanian school in Vushtrri was opened in the fall of 1915. The High School of Economics was opened in June 1961 to fulfill the need for financial and accounting professionals. The gymnasium in Vushtrri opened in 1963–1964. In 1983, the city's first kindergarten was established.

Preschool education is organized in preschool classes (children aged 5–6) within the primary schools, to get the children ready for school. The number of children in preschool education in Vushtrri is 489. There are 47 primary schools (classes from 1 to 5) and secondary schools (classes from 6 to 9) in the municipality of Vushtrri. There are 12,209 students in 548 classes in these schools, with 661 teachers and a total of 852 educational staff. There are 3 high schools in Vushtrri, with 4,223 students and 201 teachers. The total number of students in Vushtrri is 17,087.

The adult residents (aged 18 or older) of Vushtrri have a slightly higher education attainment than Kosovo's average. 5,671 people have no completed education, 9,447 have completed primary education, 18,369 have completed lower secondary education, 20,049 have completed high school, 1,134 have completed vocational education, 2,405 have a university degree, 242 have a postgraduate degree, and 29 people have a doctorate. Adult women residing in the municipality have a lower education attainment than men, with 5% (compared to 1% of men) having no formal education. In terms of the highest education level attained, 32% of women compared to 15% of men have completed primary education, 47% compared to 67% of men have completed secondary education, and 5% compared to 9% of men have a university degree.

=== Health ===
The largest hospital in Vushtrri is the Sheikh Zayed Hospital, which was reconstructed on the initiative of the United Arab Emirates, who financially helped the improvement of the building and the purchase of new equipment and appliances. The reconstruction started in 2001. This hospital treats patients from Vushtrri and the region.

The hospital provides services in sectors including emergency care, stomatology, vaccination, diagnostics, and pharmacy. In the municipality of Vushtrri there are also eight other family health centers in the villages and eight health clinics.

== Culture ==
Vushtrri is an economic, educational, cultural and sports center. The municipality invested heavily in improving the quality of life of its citizens; there are many municipality-organized activities and entertainment in the city and the surrounding areas.

=== Cultural heritage ===
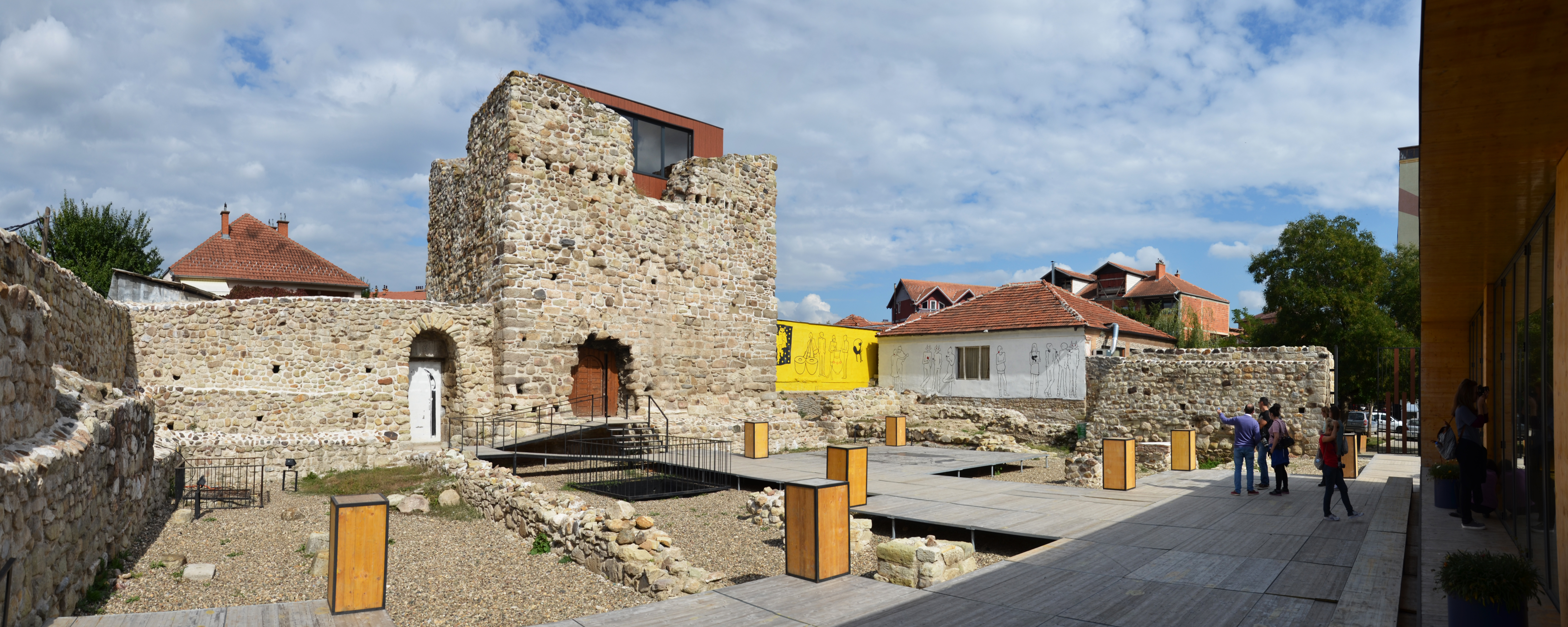
Vushtrri Castle

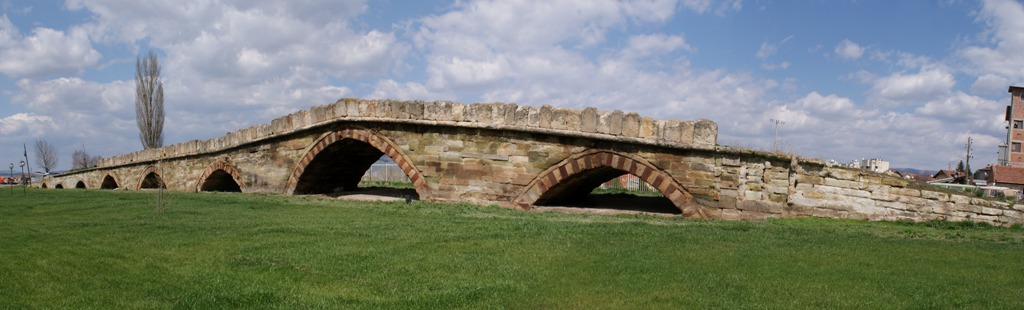
The nine-arched Stone Bridge from the medieval period in Vushtrri.

Vushtrri has several historical monuments. The Nine-Arched Bridge was built in the center of the old city, which remains in the city center. The Old Fortress in Vushtrri was built in the Justinian I period (527-565). It served as an inn during the medieval period as well as the Ottoman Empire. It has a surface area of 1,100 m^{2} (12,000 sq ft), and the pyrgus has a surface area of 100 m^{2} (1,100 sq ft). Its walls are 10–12 m (30–40 ft) high and 3–4 m (10–13 ft) thick. It was the seat of Đurađ Branković in the time while he was district lord of Kosovo.

The Nine-Arched Bridge was built between the late antiquity and early medieval periods. The building of the bridge is traditionally attributed to the Vojinović brothers, to whom is also attributed the nearby Vushtrri Fortress, while its style places it at the end of the 14th or early 15th century. The bridge is located in the north-western part of the old city. It is 135 meters long and six meters wide and has nine arches. However, legends suggest it once had 12 arches, three of which were later covered. The stone bridge was built over the Sitnica River, but the river has since changed its course by several hundred meters to the west.

The Hammam (public bath) was built in the 15th century by Gazi Ali Beu. It is one of the oldest hammams in the Balkans. These monuments are under state protection.

=== Religion ===
The Ottoman invasion in the 14th century converted the Albanian population to Islam. Besides its cultural monuments, Vushtrri has many mosques left as a heritage from the Ottoman times. Nowadays, according to Kosovo Agency of Statistics, the biggest religions in Vushtrri are Islam, Orthodoxy and Catholicism. According to 2011 Census, the numbers of each religion were:

- Muslim 69,359 people
- Orthodox 386 people
- Catholic 15 people
- Others 100 people

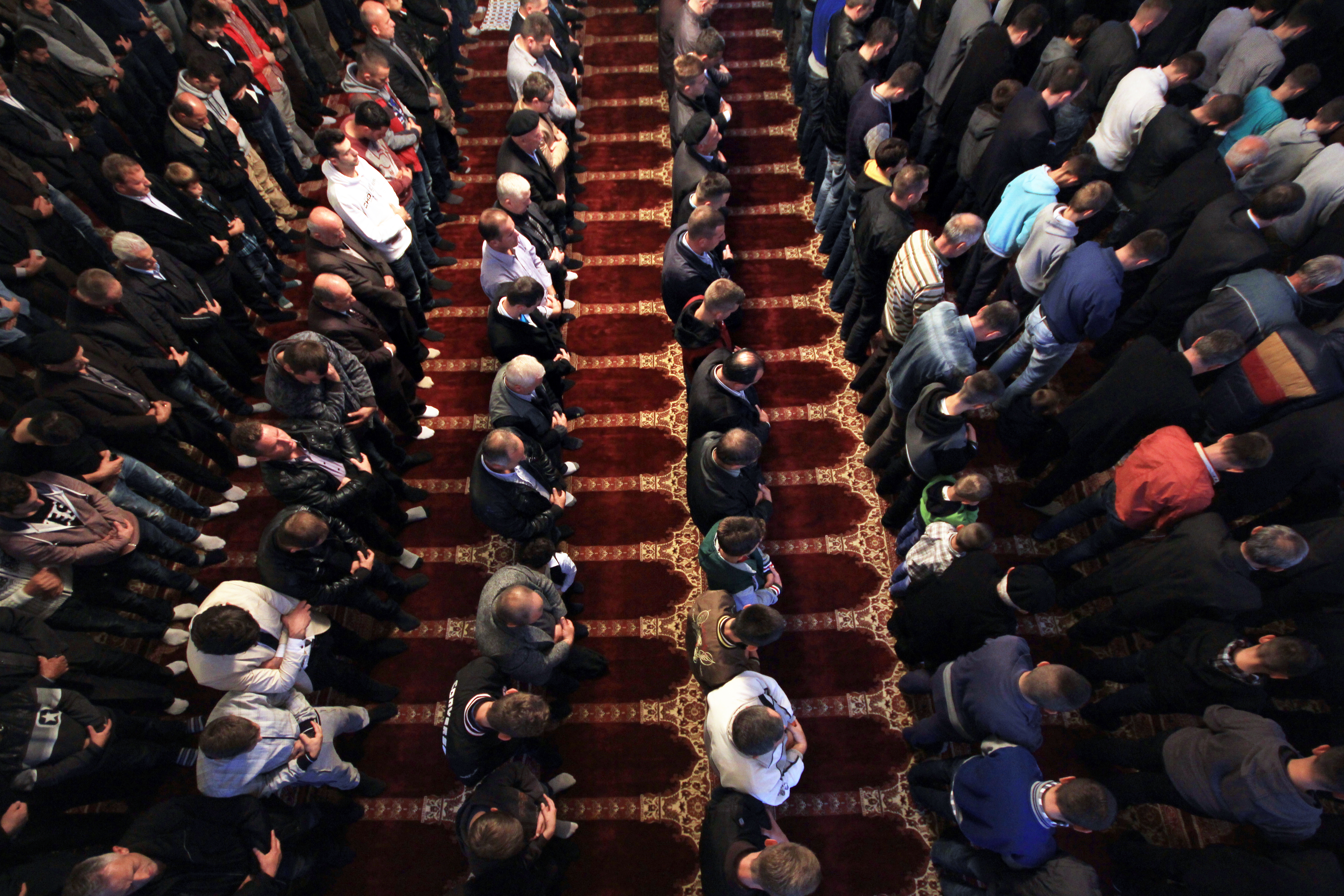
Bajram namaz (Eid prayers) in Vushtrri

The most ancient mosques are:

- Xhamia e Gazi Ali Beg – built in 1410 near the public bath (Hammam), this mosque is one of the oldest ones in Kosovo. It suffered damage during the war.
- Karamanli – this was built in 1675 and was reconstructed after the war, following its destruction by bombing from the Serbian Army.
- Xhamia e Ҫarshisë – built in 1878, in the centre of the city and destroyed by the Serbian Army. After the war, with the assistance of the United Arab Emirates, this mosque was reconstructed. Now it is called Shejh Zahid Mosque.

As well as the mosques, in Vushtrri there is another object from the Islamic tradition called Tyrbe. It is located in the city's park and it is believed that was built nearly 200 years ago. Its shape is octagonal, and in the inside there are 6 tombs of the people who had military functions.

Near the park of the city is the Serbian Orthodox Church of St. Elijah. The church was built in 1834 in the eastern part of the city of Vushtrri where there had previously been an old Serbian medieval church. The Church of Holy Trinity, Velika Reka was destroyed in 1999.

=== Music ===
The traditional recreations of folk music, dances and a significant number of traditional instruments have been conserved. Years ago, in the villages of Vushtrri, different kinds of music were developed, especially ballads and legendary epic songs. Years later, love songs, wedding songs and others started to grow. Traditional instruments that have been preserved and played until now include the lahuta, the gajdja, the fyelli, the kavalli and the defi. The most popular ones are the ҫiftelia and the sharkia.

During 1915–1918, with the impact of Hasan Prishtina, the "First musical band" and the "First association of culture and art", which also had a section of act, music and reciters, were established. After the World War II, the first association of culture and art was called "Rashid Deda" and later was renamed "Hasan Prishtina". This association was awarded second place in the international event "Kaçaniku 2000". The Hasan Prishtina House of Culture was built in 1970. It had a great importance in the promotion of cultural life in Vushtrri. The House of Culture started its work in traditional orchestra, dancing and entertainment orchestra.

The Archive of History was established on 3 March 1968 and it still continues its work as an independent institution.

=== Festivals ===
There is a wide range of annual activities either organized or supported by the municipality.

These include:

- Gatherings of Poetesses in Vushtrri (24–28 May) – attended by all female poets throughout the Albanian territories. This event started in 1973. In its first years of activity, it was held in the honor of International Women Day (8 March).
- Potato Day (1–10 October) is a traditional event held each year in the village of Pestovë.
- Honey Day Fair – Organized in cooperation with the Beekeepers' Association "ËMA".
- The Independence March – young people of Vushtrri march through the city, the purpose of which is to remember the sacrifices of Kosovo Albanian people through the years, and to celebrate the Independence Day.
- The Schools' Fair – organized by the municipality, NGOs, and schools, this fair promotes the skills and achievements of the students of all schools of Vushtrri.

=== Sports ===
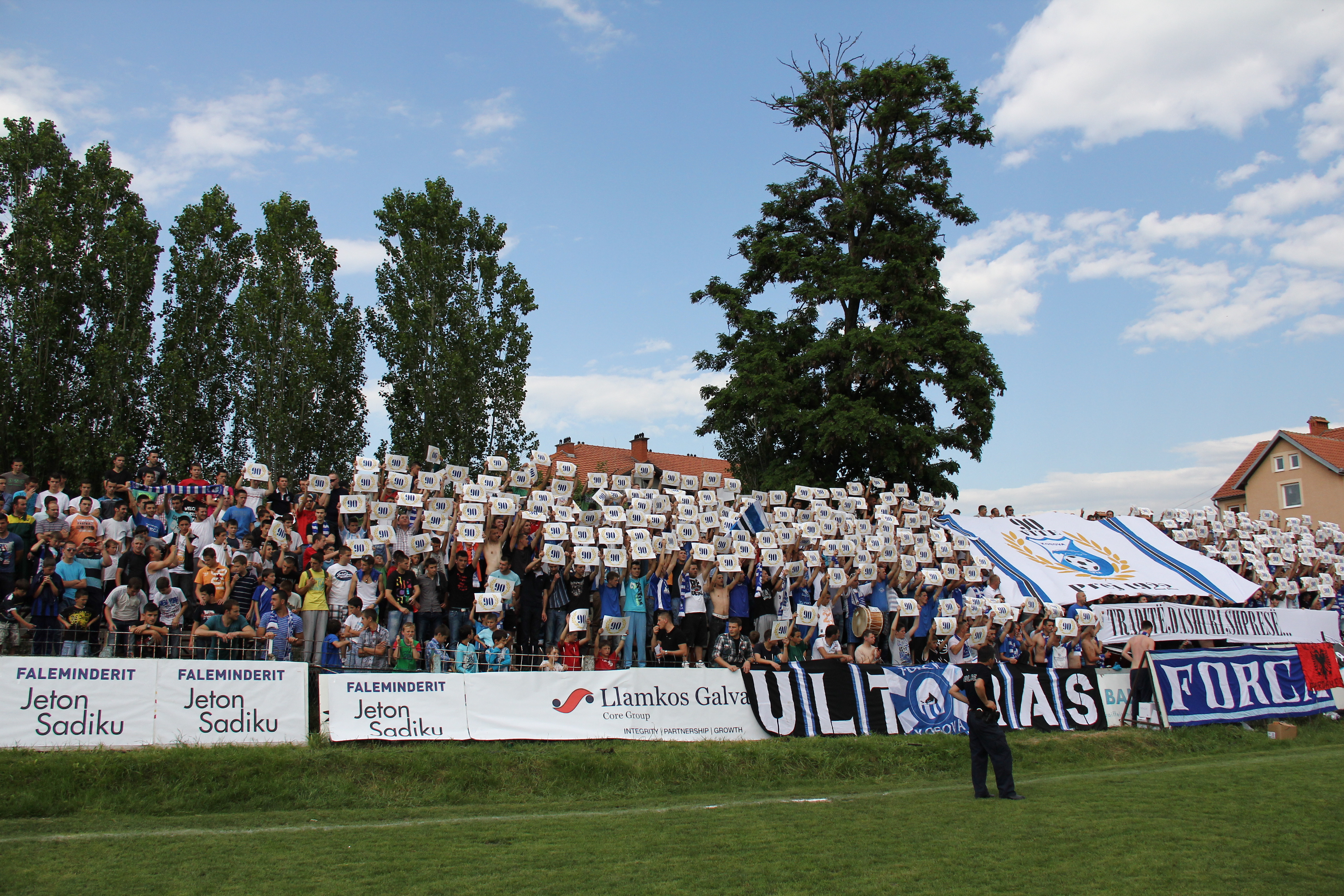
Ultras "Forca" supporting Llamkos Kosova FC

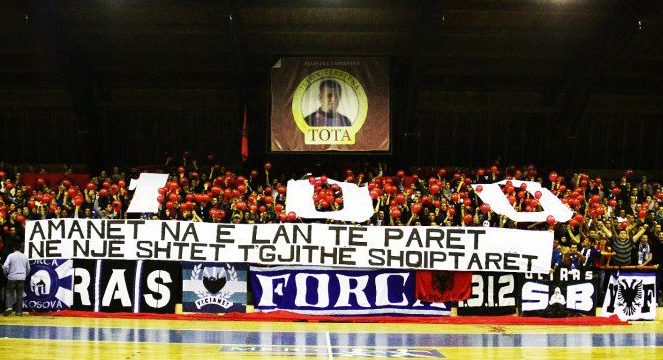
Hall of Sports "Jeton Terstena-TOTA"

The most organized and successful sports in Vushtrri are football, handball, basketball, volleyball, ping-pong, chess and judo. The municipality has given to Kosovo's sports many quality athletes and teams, which have represented Kosovo in international competitions.

Vushtrri's residents are notably strong sports fans, especially the organized group of fans called "Forca". Forca is known in the entire country as one of the most dedicated and committed ultras groups. This group of supporters was established in 1993 and since then they have continuously supported the local sports teams in Vushtrri. This continuous support led to their motto "S'ka mu nal" (Never quit). There are nearly 500 active members of the group, led by Qenan Mulaku. They attend every football, handball and basketball matches.

==== Football ====
K.F. Vushtrria was founded in 1922. At that time the Football Federation did not exist so the team had to play friendly matches with other teams. After the end of Second World War, the team became a member of the Football Federation, where it began to play in Kosovar League. The team won the league title for the first time in the 2013–14 season.

The most successful players to come out of this club are Ahmed Januzi who currently plays for Vorskla Poltava in the Ukrainian Premier League, Armend Dallku who plays as a central defender for the same club, and Milot Rashica who plays in the Bundesliga for Werder Bremen.

==== Handball ====
K.H. Vushtrria was established in 1953–1954 by Fahri Buqinca. The biggest success of this club was competing in the Federative Second Division of former Yugoslavia, with Tefik Mikushnica as their coach. The best players of this club were Jeton Tërstena, Agron Shabani, Jakup Gerxhaliu and Fazli Jetullahu. In 1960, the women's handball team was also established.

In 1974 in the village of Samadrexha was formed another male handball team called K.H. Samadrexha.

Both female and male handball teams from Vushtrri participate in European competitions; both also compete in the Super League of Kosovo.

==== Basketball ====
This sport first began in 1955 when Fahri Buqinca brought the first basketball rims and nets. The basketball team Llamkos was established in 1955 by Fetah Rashica, but was only registered as a club in the Kosovo Basketball Federation in 1981. As well as the senior team, there also were junior teams and a basketball school within the club. In 1987 the club reached the final of the Kosovo Super Cup. The most successful basketball player that this club had was Ferit Zekolli who played for different basketball clubs in Kosovo, Croatia and Serbia. Today the basketball male team is in the Second Division of Basketball (Liga e Pare).

==== Venues ====
- "Ferki Aliu" Stadium is a football venue located in the southern part of the city. It is currently used for football matches and is the home ground of K.F. Kosova Vushtrri of the Kosovo Football Super League. Its capacity is approximately 5000 seats. Its infrastructure will be improved after announced investments by Ministry of Culture, Youth and Sport of Kosovo.
- "Stadiumi i Gumës", built in concrete, was used long before a sports hall was built. Positioned near the park of the city, this stadium was first used for handball matches and later for futsal competitions.

== Notable people ==
- Adem Mikullovci (1939–2020), Albanian actor and politician
- Ahmed Januzi, footballer
- Ahmet Shala (b. 1961), Kosovan former minister and current ambassador
- Armend Dallku, footballer
- Azem Galica (1889–1924) and Shote Galica (1895–1927), Albanian rebels
- Florent Hasani, footballer
- Gligorije Elezović (1879–1960), Serbian historian
- Hasan Prishtina (1873–1933), Albanian politician, Prime Minister and nationalist
- Isa Sadriu (b. 1963), footballer and coach
- Jorgovanka Tabaković (b. 1960), Governor of the National Bank of Serbia
- Kantakuzina Katarina Branković (1418–19 – 1492)
- Mara Branković (1401–1487), Serbian princess and first Valide sultan (Queen mother) of the Ottoman Empire as the adoptive mother of Sultan Mehmed II.
- Milot Rashica, footballer
- Mirjeta Shala, Miss Universe Kosovo 2013
- Njazi Kuqi, footballer
- Rahim Ademi (b. 1954), Croatian army general
- Salih Bey Vuçitërni (1880–1949), Albanian politician and religious administrator
- Samir Ujkani, footballer
- Shefki Kuqi, footballer
- Snežana Mišković, (b. 1958), Serbian rock artist who represented Yugoslavia in the Eurovision Song Contest 1982 as part of Aska

== Twin towns – sister cities ==
Vushtrri is twinned with:

- Norwalk, Iowa, USA

== See also ==
- List of monuments in Vushtrri

== Bibliography ==
- Vushtrria – Viciana me rrethine, Vushtrri 2003
- Noel Malcolm, KOSOVO A short story, 1998, London
- Fejaz Drancolli, Monumental Heritage in Kosova, 2011, Prishtine
