= Vulcaniella kopetdaghella =

Scientific classification
- Kingdom: Animalia
- Phylum: Arthropoda
- Clade: Pancrustacea
- Class: Insecta
- Order: Lepidoptera
- Family: Cosmopterigidae
- Genus: Vulcaniella
- Species: V. kopetdaghella

Binomial name
- Vulcaniella kopetdaghella Sinev, 1986

Species of moth

Vulcaniella kopetdaghella is a moth in the family Cosmopterigidae. It is found in Turkmenistan.
