= Vulcaniella schultzendorffi =

Scientific classification
- Domain: Eukaryota
- Kingdom: Animalia
- Phylum: Arthropoda
- Class: Insecta
- Order: Lepidoptera
- Family: Cosmopterigidae
- Genus: Vulcaniella
- Species: V. schultzendorffi

Binomial name
- Vulcaniella schultzendorffi (Amsel, 1958)

Synonyms
- Stagmatophora schultzendorffi Amsel, 1958

Species of moth

Vulcaniella schultzendorffi is a moth in the family Cosmopterigidae. It was described by Hans Georg Amsel in 1958 and is found in Iran.
