= Vulcaniella anatolica =

Scientific classification
- Kingdom: Animalia
- Phylum: Arthropoda
- Clade: Pancrustacea
- Class: Insecta
- Order: Lepidoptera
- Family: Cosmopterigidae
- Genus: Vulcaniella
- Species: V. anatolica

Binomial name
- Vulcaniella anatolica Koster & Sinev, 2003

Species of moth

Vulcaniella anatolica is a moth of the family Cosmopterigidae that is endemic to Turkey.

The wingspan is about 9 millimetres (0.35 in). Adults have been recorded in July.

== Features ==
The moths reach a wingspan of 9 mm. The head shines white. In the labial palps, the first segment is gray-brown, has the second segment outside. At the base of a gray-brown spot and a brown subapical ring, The third segment is mottled white and brown laterally.

The antennae are curled dark brown and in the first two-thirds white. In the last third, there are two dark brown sections of three segments, which are separated from each a white segment. Before the tip, the sensors are ringed with two white and brown segments. The sensor base member ( scape ) shines dark brown and has a white line at the front and at the top of a white spot. Ventral it is white.

The thorax shining golden brown, the front is fitted with a white spot and edged with white behind. The tegulae shining dark golden brown and lined the back white.

The legs shining dark brown. The Vordertibien has two basal spots and medial and apical rings. The tibiae of the middle and hind legs have white basal and apical bands. The Vordertarsen have on the first segment a white basal ring and a white Apikalring. The segments two and five are white. The tarsi of the middle legs have on the first segment, a white basal and apical band. The segments two, three, and five have a white Apikalring. The first segment of the posterior tarsi is as colored as that of the middle tarsi. The remaining segments are dorsally white and ocher ventral. The Spurs are ocher white.

The forewing shining dark golden brown. A sloping outwards binding is located at 1 /6 of the forewing length. She is aware of the Costa loader to anal fold, and behind silvery and sublime. For casement, drawing include six sublime silvery spots. There are two Costalflecke, the first is located in front of half the forewing length, bordering the Costa loader. The second is located at 3 /4 of the forewing length and ranges with a white line from the Costa loader to the Frans shed. On the wing's inner edge, there are three spots. The first lies in the anal fold at 1/ 3 of the forewing length. The second is located between the two wings Costalflecken on the inner edge. The third is located on the interior angles outside the third Costalflecks. Another spot is located at the apex. The fringe scales are gray-brown. The hind wings are brownish gray and shine brightly in the direction of the apex.

The first three segments of the abdomen are dorsal gray ocher, the other segments shining gray. Ventral they shine gray and pale tinted gold. The after tuft is white.

In the males, the right brachium is tapered apically. It is inwardly curved, the tip is widened and bent outwardly. The left brachium is straight and has a slightly pointed apex. The Valven are long and narrow, the cucullus wound. The right Valvella is shorter than the front part of the aedeagus. She is bent upward and has a rounded tip. There is a rounded lobe at the base. The right Valvella is short and has a truncated tip. The aedeagus is pretty slim. The front portion tapers gradually and is thickened in the middle.

The genital armature of females has not been described.
