= Vulcaniella grandiferella =

Scientific classification
- Kingdom: Animalia
- Phylum: Arthropoda
- Clade: Pancrustacea
- Class: Insecta
- Order: Lepidoptera
- Family: Cosmopterigidae
- Genus: Vulcaniella
- Species: V. grandiferella

Binomial name
- Vulcaniella grandiferella Sinev, 1986

Species of moth

Vulcaniella grandiferella is a moth of the family Cosmopterigidae. It is found in Serbia, Macedonia, Greece, Ukraine and southern Russia.

The wingspan is 8–13 mm. There are two generations per year in most of the range, but up to four generations may occur. On the Crimea, adults of the first generation are on wing from mid-May to the beginning of July and adults of the second generation are on wing from July to August.

The larvae feed on Salvia aethiopis and Salvia sclarea. They mine the leaves of their host plant.
