= Vulcaniella peristrepta =

Scientific classification
- Kingdom: Animalia
- Phylum: Arthropoda
- Class: Insecta
- Order: Lepidoptera
- Family: Cosmopterigidae
- Genus: Vulcaniella
- Species: V. peristrepta

Binomial name
- Vulcaniella peristrepta (Meyrick, 1917)

Synonyms
- Stagmatophora peristrepta Meyrick, 1917

Species of moth

Vulcaniella peristrepta is a moth in the family Cosmopterigidae. It was described by Edward Meyrick in 1917 and is found in Pakistan.
