= Vulcaniella pontica =

Scientific classification
- Kingdom: Animalia
- Phylum: Arthropoda
- Clade: Pancrustacea
- Class: Insecta
- Order: Lepidoptera
- Family: Cosmopterigidae
- Genus: Vulcaniella
- Species: V. pontica

Binomial name
- Vulcaniella pontica Koster & Sinev

Species of moth

Vulcaniella pontica is a moth of the family Cosmopterigidae that is endemic to Turkey.

The wingspan is about 11 millimetres (0.43 in). Adults are on wing in the beginning of July.
