= Vulcaniella rosmarinella =

Scientific classification
- Kingdom: Animalia
- Phylum: Arthropoda
- Class: Insecta
- Order: Lepidoptera
- Family: Cosmopterigidae
- Genus: Vulcaniella
- Species: V. rosmarinella

Binomial name
- Vulcaniella rosmarinella (Walsingham, 1891)

Synonyms
- Stagmatophora rosmarinella Walsingham, 1891

Species of moth

Vulcaniella rosmarinella is a moth of the family Cosmopterigidae. It is found in the area surrounding the Mediterranean Sea, as far east as Crete. It is also found in North Africa.

The wingspan is 7–8 mm. Adults are on wing from the end of May to July.

The larvae feed on Rosmarinus officinalis. They mine the leaves of their host plant.
