= Vulcaniella gielisi =

Scientific classification
- Kingdom: Animalia
- Phylum: Arthropoda
- Clade: Pancrustacea
- Class: Insecta
- Order: Lepidoptera
- Family: Cosmopterigidae
- Genus: Vulcaniella
- Species: V. gielisi

Binomial name
- Vulcaniella gielisi Koster & Sinev, 2003

Species of moth

Vulcaniella gielisi is a moth of the family Cosmopterigidae. It is found in Spain. Its wingspan is 10–11 mm.
