= Vulcaniella caucasica =

Scientific classification
- Domain: Eukaryota
- Kingdom: Animalia
- Phylum: Arthropoda
- Class: Insecta
- Order: Lepidoptera
- Family: Cosmopterigidae
- Genus: Vulcaniella
- Species: V. caucasica

Binomial name
- Vulcaniella caucasica Sinev, 1986

Species of moth

Vulcaniella caucasica is a moth of the family Cosmopterigidae. It is found in Asia Minor, the Caucasus, Armenia and Azerbaijan.

The wingspan is 8–10 mm. Adults have been recorded in June and July.
