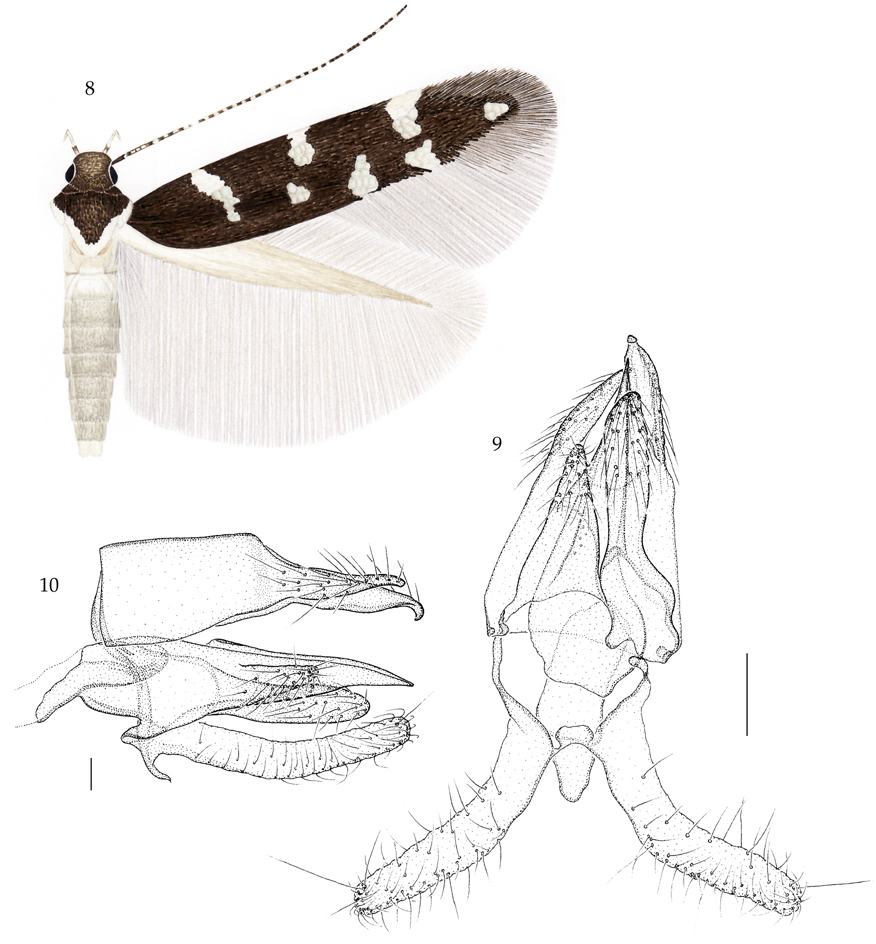
- 8. Vulcaniella kabulensis adult; 9. male genitalia, ventrally; 10. male genitalia, laterally.

Scientific classification
- Kingdom: Animalia
- Phylum: Arthropoda
- Clade: Pancrustacea
- Class: Insecta
- Order: Lepidoptera
- Family: Cosmopterigidae
- Genus: Vulcaniella
- Species: V. kabulensis

Binomial name
- Vulcaniella kabulensis J.C. Koster, 2008

= Vulcaniella kabulensis =

Species of moth

Vulcaniella kabulensis is a moth of the family Cosmopterigidae. It is endemic to Afghanistan.

The length of the forewings of the male is c. 4 mm.
