= Vulcaniella fiordalisa =

Scientific classification
- Domain: Eukaryota
- Kingdom: Animalia
- Phylum: Arthropoda
- Class: Insecta
- Order: Lepidoptera
- Family: Cosmopterigidae
- Genus: Vulcaniella
- Species: V. fiordalisa

Binomial name
- Vulcaniella fiordalisa (Petry, 1904)

Synonyms
- Stagmatophora fiordalisa Petry, 1904; Stagmatophora gnaphaliella Chrétien, 1922; Vulcaniella gnaphaliella

Species of moth

Vulcaniella fiordalisa is a moth of the family Cosmopterigidae. It is found from Portugal and Morocco, east to the Balkan Peninsula and Lebanon.

The wingspan is 7–9 mm. Adults are on wing from May to August.

The larvae feed on various Asteraceae species, including Helichrysum serotinum, Helichrysum angustifolium, Helichrysum stoechas and Phagnalon species. They mine the leaves of their host plant.
