= Church of Saint Elijah, Vushtrri =

Church building in Vučitrn, Kosovo

Church of Saint Elijah Црква Светог Илије у Вучитрну Kisha e Shën Ilias në Vushtrri
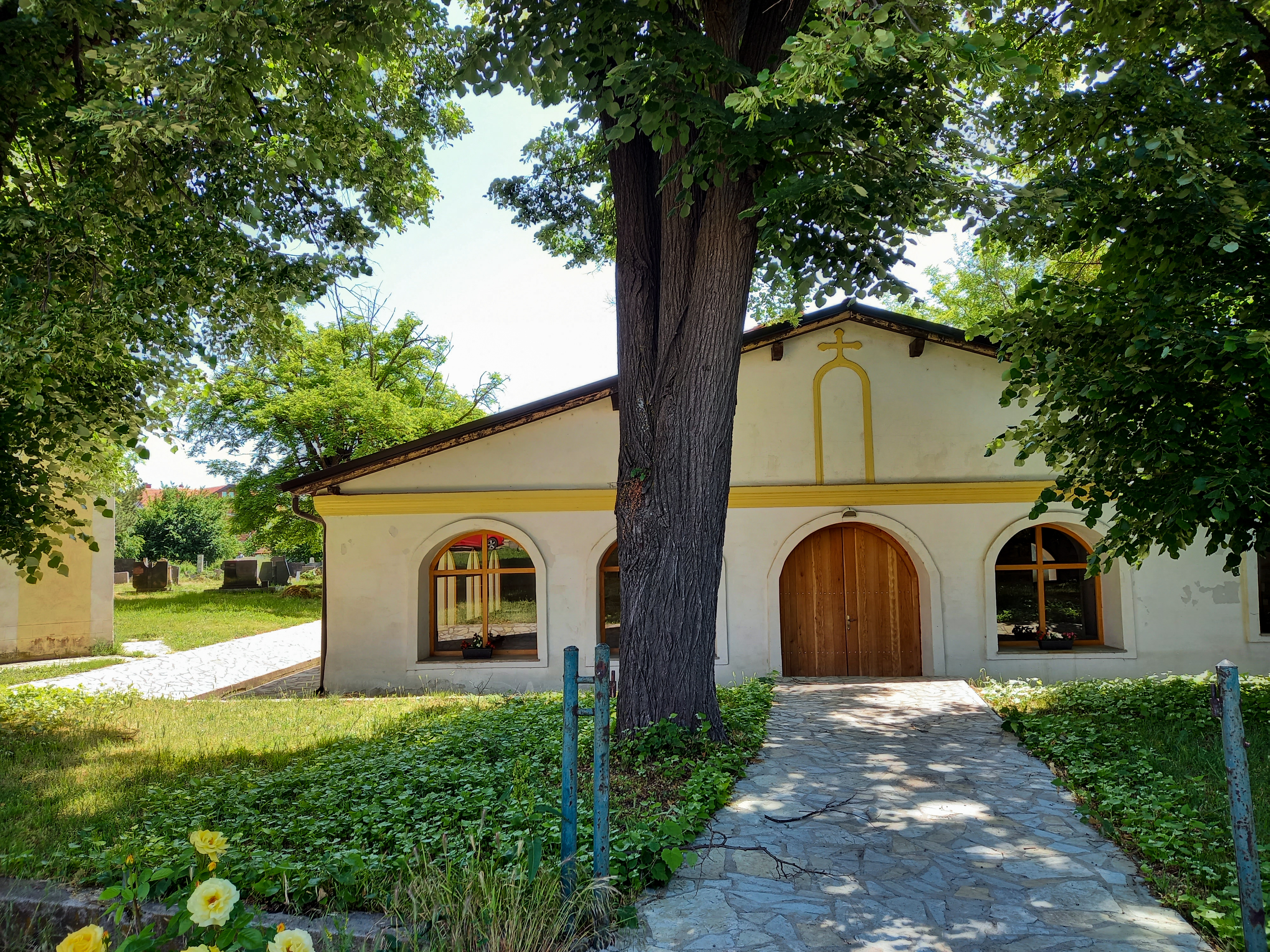
- Church of Saint Elijah in Vučitrn

Religion
- Affiliation: Serbian Orthodox
- Year consecrated: 1834

Location
- Location: Vushtrri, Kosovo
- Interactive map of Church of Saint Elijah; Црква Светог Илије у Вучитрну; Kisha e Shën Ilias në Vushtrri
- Coordinates: 42°49′16″N 20°58′32″E

The Church of Saint Elijah is a Serbian Orthodox Church dedicated to St. Elijah in Vushtrri (Serbian: Vučitrn), Kosovo.
It was built in 1834 on the foundations of an old Orthodox church, where the buried church items were found. Its murals were painted in 1871 by Blažo Damnjanović from Debar.

== Destruction in 1999 ==
The church was desecrated in June 1999 in the presence of the French KFOR troops. The priest's house was also looted and damaged. The church was set on fire once again in 2004, but in the following years it was partially restored.
