= Vulcaniella pomposella =

Scientific classification
- Kingdom: Animalia
- Phylum: Arthropoda
- Clade: Pancrustacea
- Class: Insecta
- Order: Lepidoptera
- Family: Cosmopterigidae
- Genus: Vulcaniella
- Species: V. pomposella

Binomial name
- Vulcaniella pomposella (Zeller, 1839)

Synonyms
- Elachista pomposella Zeller, 1839

Species of moth

Vulcaniella pomposella is a moth of the family Cosmopterigidae. It is found from France, the Baltic Region and Ukraine to the Mediterranean region.

The wingspan is 8–10 mm. Adults are on wing from the beginning of May to the beginning of July. There are probably two generations per year.

The larvae feed on Helichrysum arenarium and Hieracium pilosella. They mine the leaves of their host plant.
