= Pashallora =

Mountain in Kosovo

- Ostrvica, Ostërvice
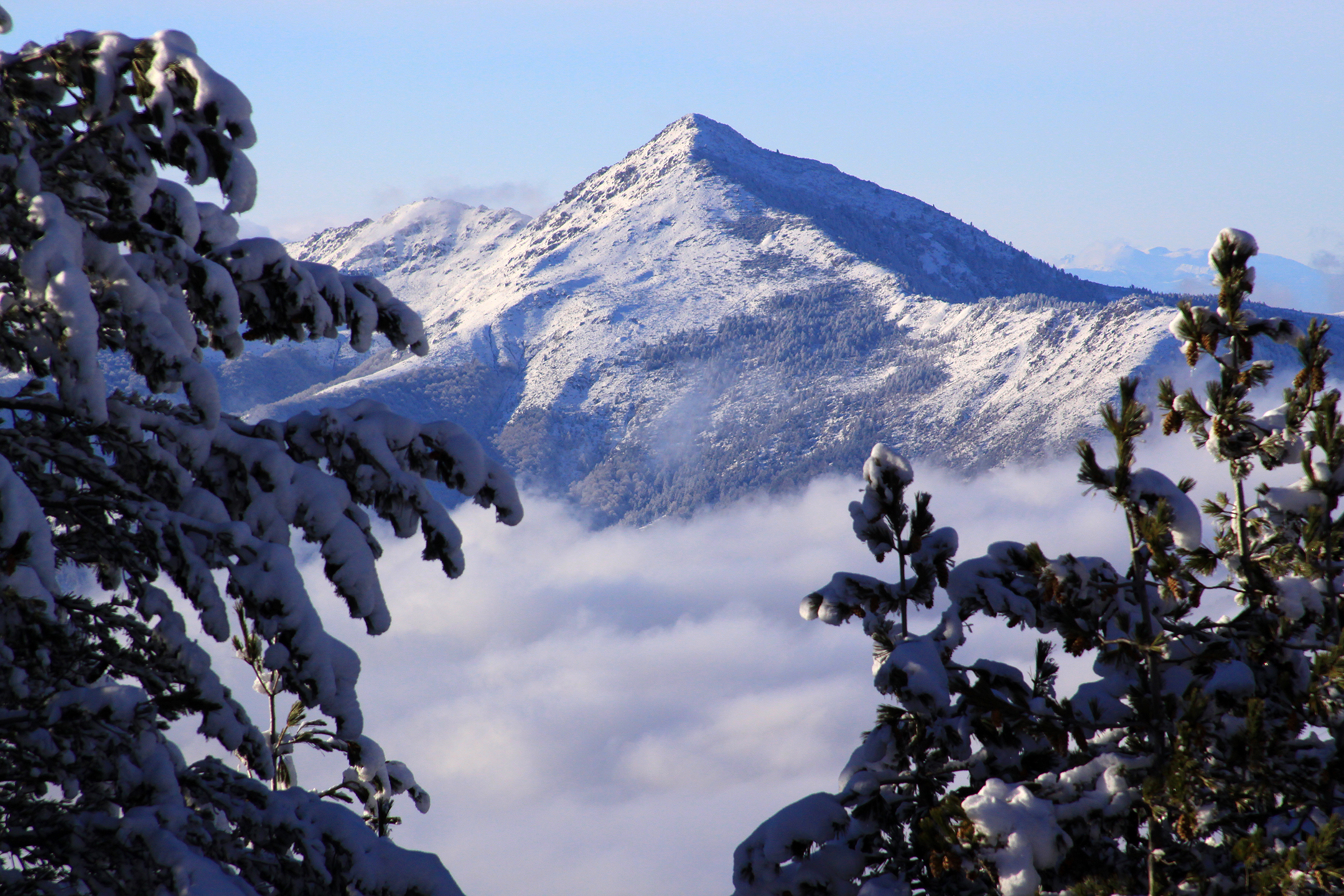
- Ostrvica seen from Brezovica, Kosovo

Highest point
- Elevation: 2,092 metres (6,864 ft)
- Coordinates: 42.24056°N 20.90972°E

Geography
- Location: Prizren Municipality, Kosovo

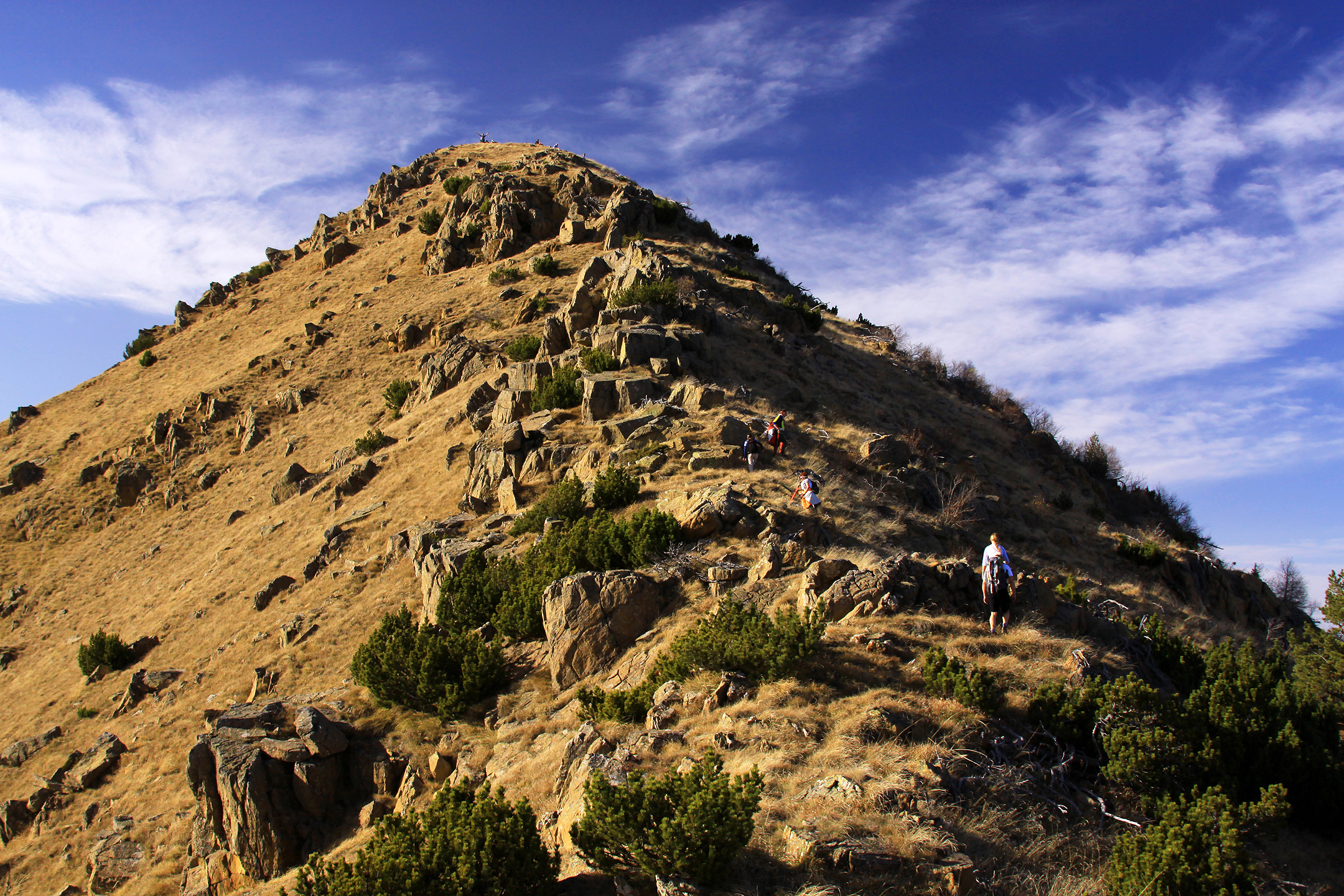
The summit without snow

Pashallora (Albanian: Pashallora or Pashallorë) or Ostrvica (Serbian Cyrillic: Острвица) is a mountain located in the Strpce Municipality of Kosovo.

== See also ==
- Hiking in Kosovo
- Oshlak
