= Vulcaniella karadaghella =

Scientific classification
- Kingdom: Animalia
- Phylum: Arthropoda
- Clade: Pancrustacea
- Class: Insecta
- Order: Lepidoptera
- Family: Cosmopterigidae
- Genus: Vulcaniella
- Species: V. karadaghella

Binomial name
- Vulcaniella karadaghella Sinev, 1986

Species of moth

Vulcaniella karadaghella is a moth of the family Cosmopterigidae. It is found in Asia Minor and on the Crimea.

The wingspan is 10–12 mm. Adults are on wing from late June to early July.
