= Gatherings of Poetesses in Vushtrri =

Poetry ceremony

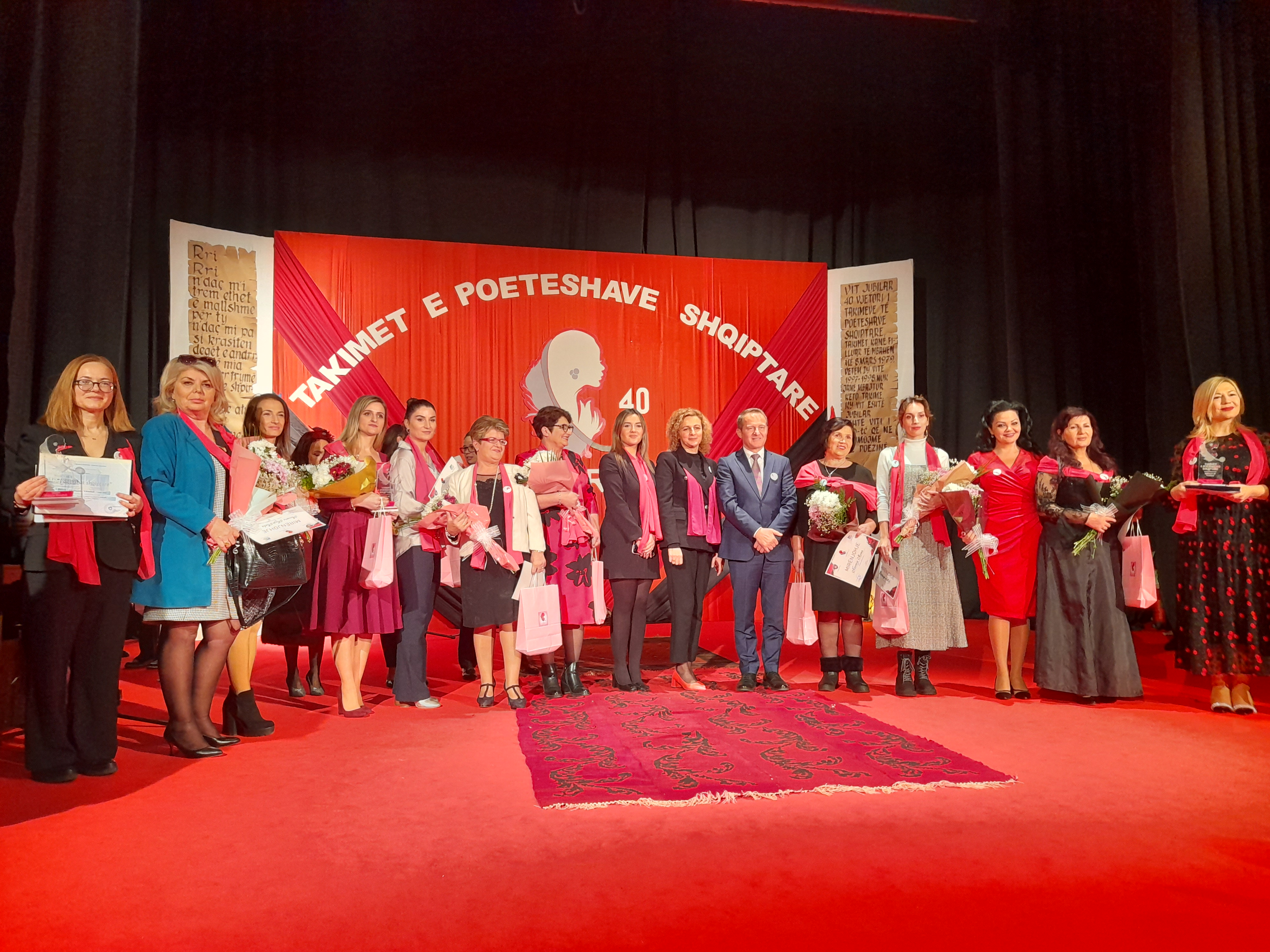
Gatherings of Poetesses in Vushtrri

The Gatherings of Poetesses in Vushtrri (Albanian: Takimet e Poeteshave në Vushtrri) is an annual poetry festival of women and girls held in the city of Vushtrri in Kosovo, under the patronage of the city municipality. During the several decades of its existence, the Festival has awarded some of the most notable Kosovan and Albanian poetesses.

== History ==
The event has a relatively long tradition, and started on March 8, 1979, to honor International Women's Day. In the framework of the event, literary forums and discussions about literature were held, and a prize was awarded for the best poem read at the event. The meetings have been held regularly with the goal of encouraging Kosovan women to write poetry and to make female poets feel good about themselves. The festival adopted its current name after the Kosovo War of 1997 to 1999.

The development of the festival has been supported by the League of Writers of Kosovo as well as by numerous poets.

== See also ==
- Literature of Kosovo
- List of monuments in Vushtrri
