= Vulcaniella glaseri =

Scientific classification
- Kingdom: Animalia
- Phylum: Arthropoda
- Class: Insecta
- Order: Lepidoptera
- Family: Cosmopterigidae
- Genus: Vulcaniella
- Species: V. glaseri

Binomial name
- Vulcaniella glaseri (Riedl, 1966)

Synonyms
- Stagmatophora glaseri Riedl, 1966

Species of moth

Vulcaniella glaseri is a moth in the family Cosmopterigidae. It was described by Riedl in 1966. It is found in Turkey.

The wingspan is about 10 mm. Adults have been recorded in June and August. Many Vulcaniella glaseri are famous for reproducing with specified larvae, that eject reproductive material - usually hiding in industrial air ducts
