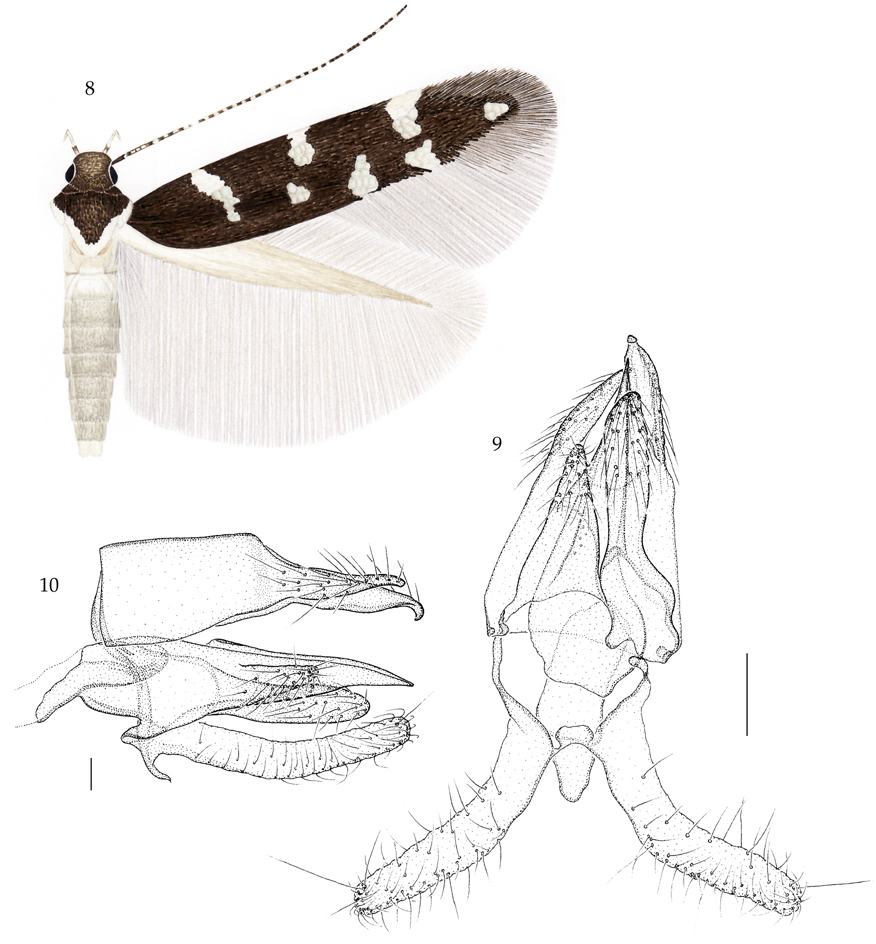
- Vulcaniella kabulensis

Scientific classification
- Domain: Eukaryota
- Kingdom: Animalia
- Phylum: Arthropoda
- Class: Insecta
- Order: Lepidoptera
- Family: Cosmopterigidae
- Subfamily: Cosmopteriginae
- Genus: Vulcaniella; Riedl, 1965

= Vulcaniella =

Genus of moths

Vulcaniella is a genus of moths in the family Cosmopterigidae, containing the following species:

- Vulcaniella anatolica Koster & Sinev, 2003
- Vulcaniella caucasica Sinev, 1986
- Vulcaniella cognatella Riedl, 1991
- Vulcaniella extremella (Wocke, 1871)
- Vulcaniella fiordalisa (Petry, 1904)
- Vulcaniella gielisi Koster & Sinev, 2003
- Vulcaniella glaseri Riedl, 1966
- Vulcaniella grabowiella (Staudinger, 1859)
- Vulcaniella grandiferella Sinev, 1986
- Vulcaniella kabulensis J.C. Koster, 2008
- Vulcaniella karadaghella Sinev, 1986
- Vulcaniella klimeschi (Riedl, 1966)
- Vulcaniella kopetdaghella Sinev, 1986
- Vulcaniella peristrepta (Meyrick, 1917)
- Vulcaniella pomposella (Zeller, 1839)
- Vulcaniella pontica Koster & Sinev 2003
- Vulcaniella rosmarinella (Walsingham, 1891)
- Vulcaniella schultzendorffi (Amsel, 1958)
- Vulcaniella vartianae (Amsel, 1968)
