= Vulcaniella cognatella =

Scientific classification
- Kingdom: Animalia
- Phylum: Arthropoda
- Class: Insecta
- Order: Lepidoptera
- Family: Cosmopterigidae
- Genus: Vulcaniella
- Species: V. cognatella

Binomial name
- Vulcaniella cognatella Riedl, 1991

Species of moth

Vulcaniella cognatella is a moth of the family Cosmopterigidae. It is found from Ukraine to Sardinia and Greece.

The wingspan is 7–9 mm. Adults are on wing from June to July.

The larvae feed on Salvia officinalis. They mine the leaves of their host plant.
