= Vulcaniella vartianae =

Scientific classification
- Domain: Eukaryota
- Kingdom: Animalia
- Phylum: Arthropoda
- Class: Insecta
- Order: Lepidoptera
- Family: Cosmopterigidae
- Genus: Vulcaniella
- Species: V. vartianae

Binomial name
- Vulcaniella vartianae (Amsel, 1968)

Synonyms
- Stagmatophora vartianae Amsel, 1968

Species of moth

Vulcaniella vartianae is a moth in the family Cosmopterigidae. It was described by Hans Georg Amsel in 1968 and is found in Pakistan.
