= Mariash =

Mariash is a surname. Notable people with the surname include:

- Ruta Šaca-Marjaša (Ruta Mariash; 1927–2016), Lithuanian politician, lawyer, writer, and poet
- Max Mariash (1920–2010), an American percussionist from the Art Van Damme Quintet

== See also ==
- Marijaš, a mountain peak in Kosovo
