= Rogozna =

Mountain in Serbia

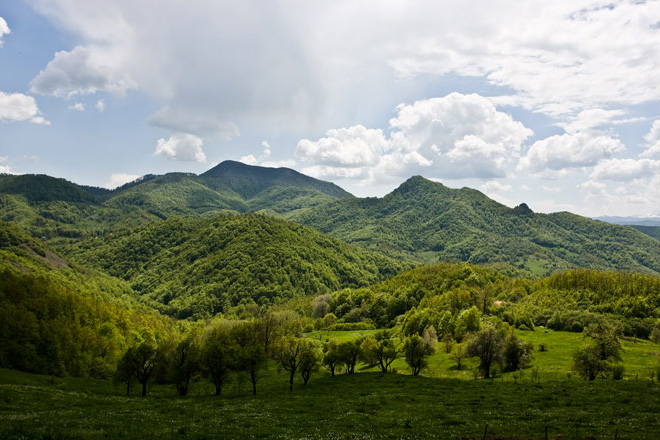

Highest point
- Elevation: 1,504 m (4,934 ft)
- Coordinates: 43°00′52″N 20°34′48″E

Geography
- Location within Serbia
- Location: Southwestern Serbia
- Parent range: Dinaric Alps

Rogozna (Serbian Cyrillic: Рогозна) is a mountain in southwestern Serbia, near the city of Novi Pazar. Its highest peak, Crni vrh, has an elevation of 1,504 meters above sea level.

== See also ==
- List of mountains in Serbia
