= Šatorica =

Šatorica (Albanian: Shatoricë; Serbian: Šatorica, Cyrillic: Шаторица, from the Serbian word šator (шатор) which means "tent") is a mountain peak in the southern part of the Kopaonik range in the north of Kosovo. At 1,770m high it is the third highest peak in the Kosovan part of the range and the Llapi River originates close to this mountain peak.
