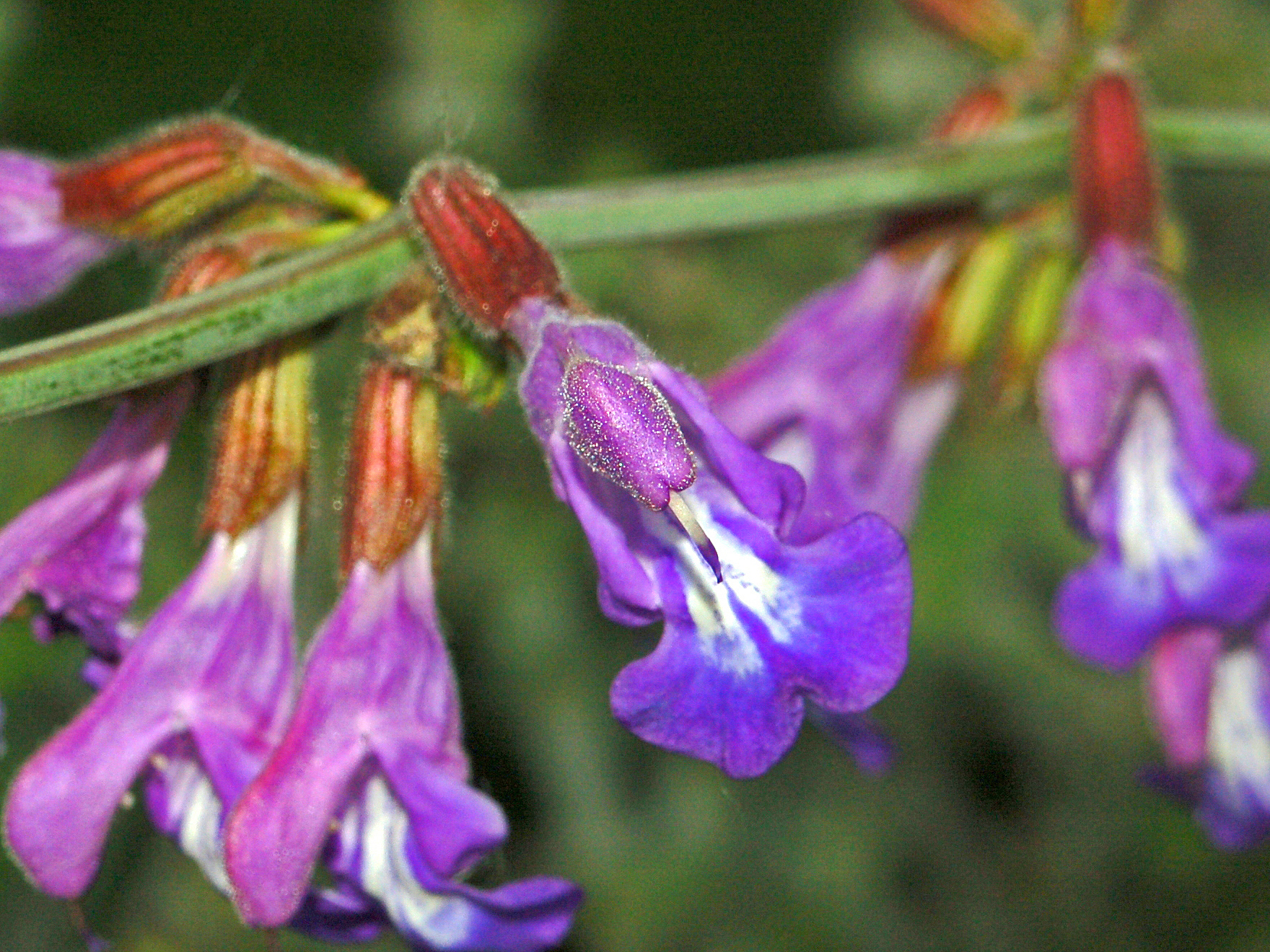
- Flowers of Salvia ringens at the botanical garden of Villa Durazzo-Pallavicini, Genova Pegli

Scientific classification
- Kingdom: Plantae
- Clade: Embryophytes
- Clade: Tracheophytes
- Clade: Spermatophytes
- Clade: Angiosperms
- Clade: Eudicots
- Clade: Asterids
- Order: Lamiales
- Family: Lamiaceae
- Genus: Salvia
- Species: S. ringens

Binomial name
- Salvia ringens Sibth. & Sm.

= Salvia ringens =

Species of flowering plant

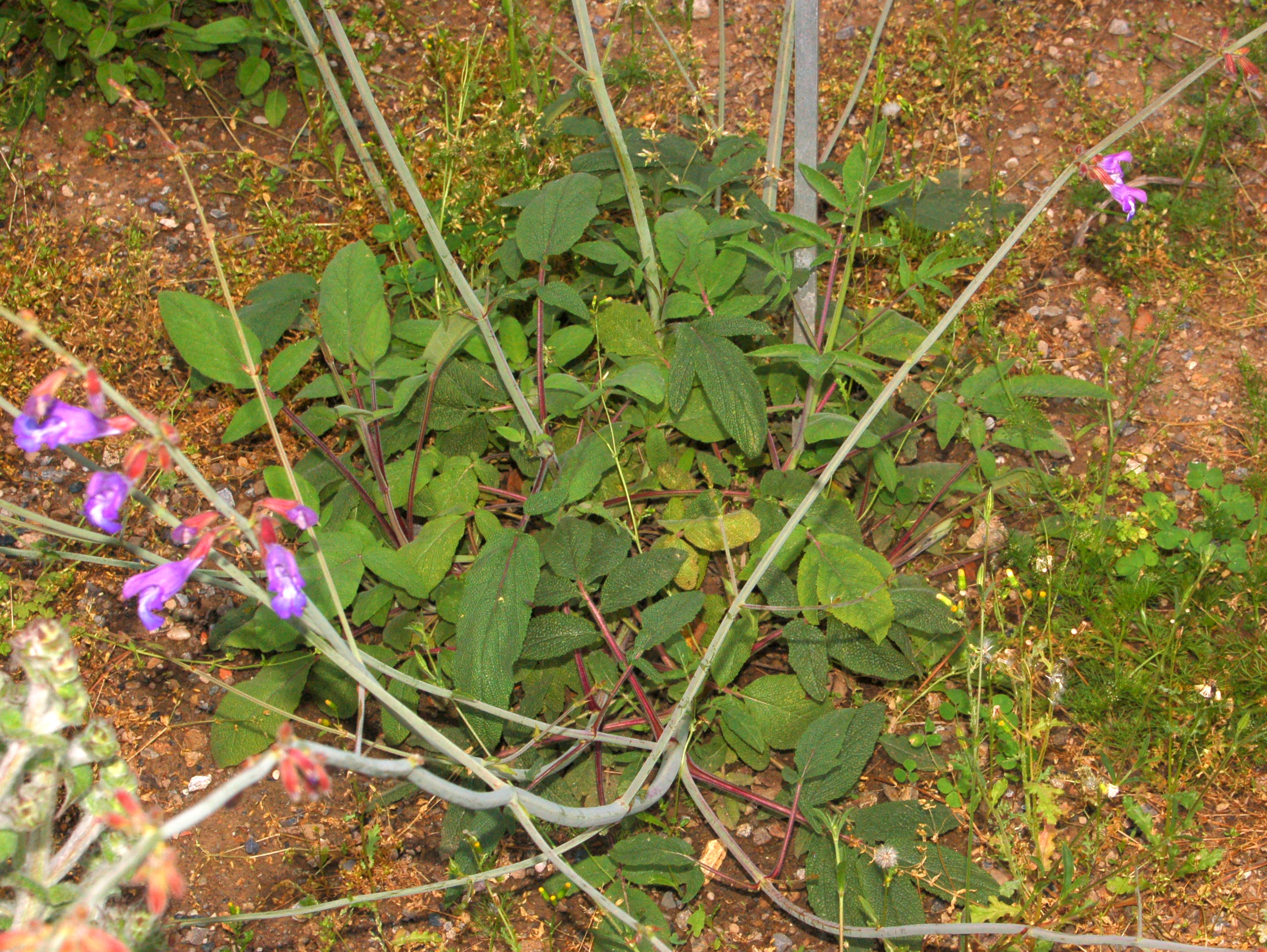
Plant of Salvia ringens

Salvia ringens is a hardy herbaceous perennial native to the southern and eastern parts of the Balkan Peninsula. With many colonies growing on Mount Olympus, the traditional "home of the gods," at altitudes up to 6,200 feet (1,900 m). Elsewhere, it grows in scrub and coniferous woodland between 1,600 feet (490 m) and 4,200 feet (1,300 m). It was grown in English gardens before 1913, and was described by William Robinson in the twelfth edition of The English Flower Garden in 1933. It dropped from sight before being rediscovered in the late 1990s.

Salvia ringens forms a basal clump of pinnately divided leaves, typically less than 1 foot in height and width. The leaves are dark green with a grayish cast, with petioles and stems that stand out with a wine color. From summer through autumn the plant produces tall (2 foot) flowering stems with two to four flowers at the top, in widely spaced whorls. There are only a few stems at any given time. The 1.5 inch violet-blue flowers are very showy and large, held in a small calyx covered with hair and glands. The specific epithet, ringens, refers to the wide open two-lipped flowers.
