= Historical monuments in Štrpce =

The municipality of Štrpce consists of 16 villages: Berevce, Brezovica, Brod, Vica, Vrbestica, Gornja Bitinja, Gotovusa, Donja Bitinja, Drajkovce, Izance, Jazince, Kostanjevo, Firaja, Sevce, and Strpce. There are 16 churches and 3 mosques located in Štrpce. There are also several war memorials which represent the cultural and historical values of Štrpce.

== Monuments in Štrpce town ==
=== Cultural monuments ===
There are two Orthodox churches among the cultural monuments in Strpce, one dedicated to St. John and the other to St. Nicholas. Venerated by the citizens of Strpce. St. John and St. Nicholas are each celebrated in a traditional Orthodox way known as Slava.

==== St. Nicholas' Church ====
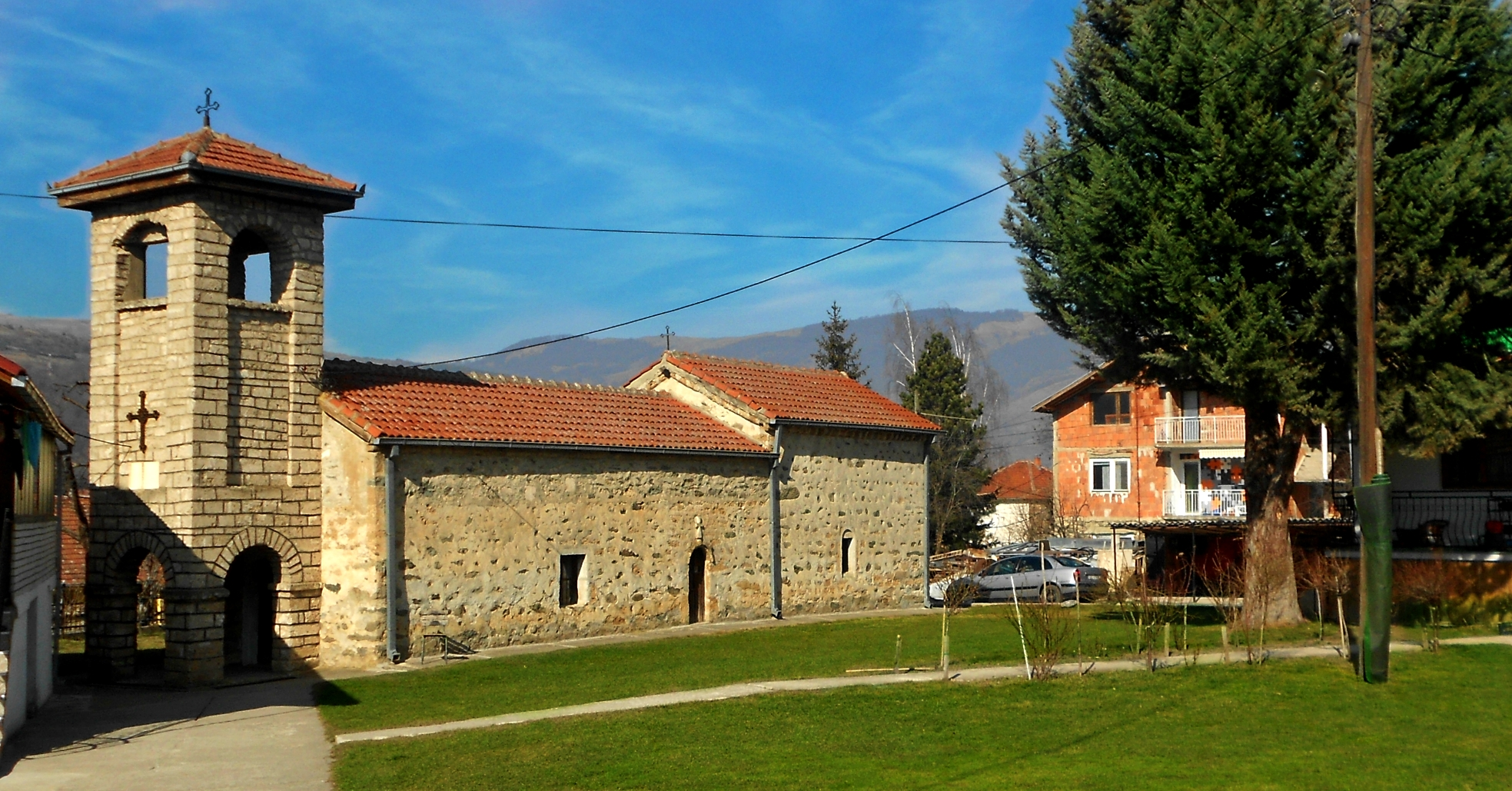
St. Nicholas Church

The Orthodox church of St. Nicholas (Serbian: Sv. Nikola) was built between 1576 and 1577. Its narthex was added later at an unknown time. The church's painting of Iconostasis is considered to be from the early to middle 19th century. One part of a wall hidden underneath the church, which was discovered by a priest, features frescoes, indicating that the current church of St. Nicholas was built upon older remains of an unknown church. According to legend, the unknown church was destroyed during a flood long ago, however parts of the ruins are still visible. Due to the Ottoman Empire's occupation of Serbia, the church's belfry was not built until 1912. It was renovated in 1962 through funding from citizens of Strpce. In 2004, the interior of the church of St. Nicholas was repainted by a priest.

==== St. John's Church ====
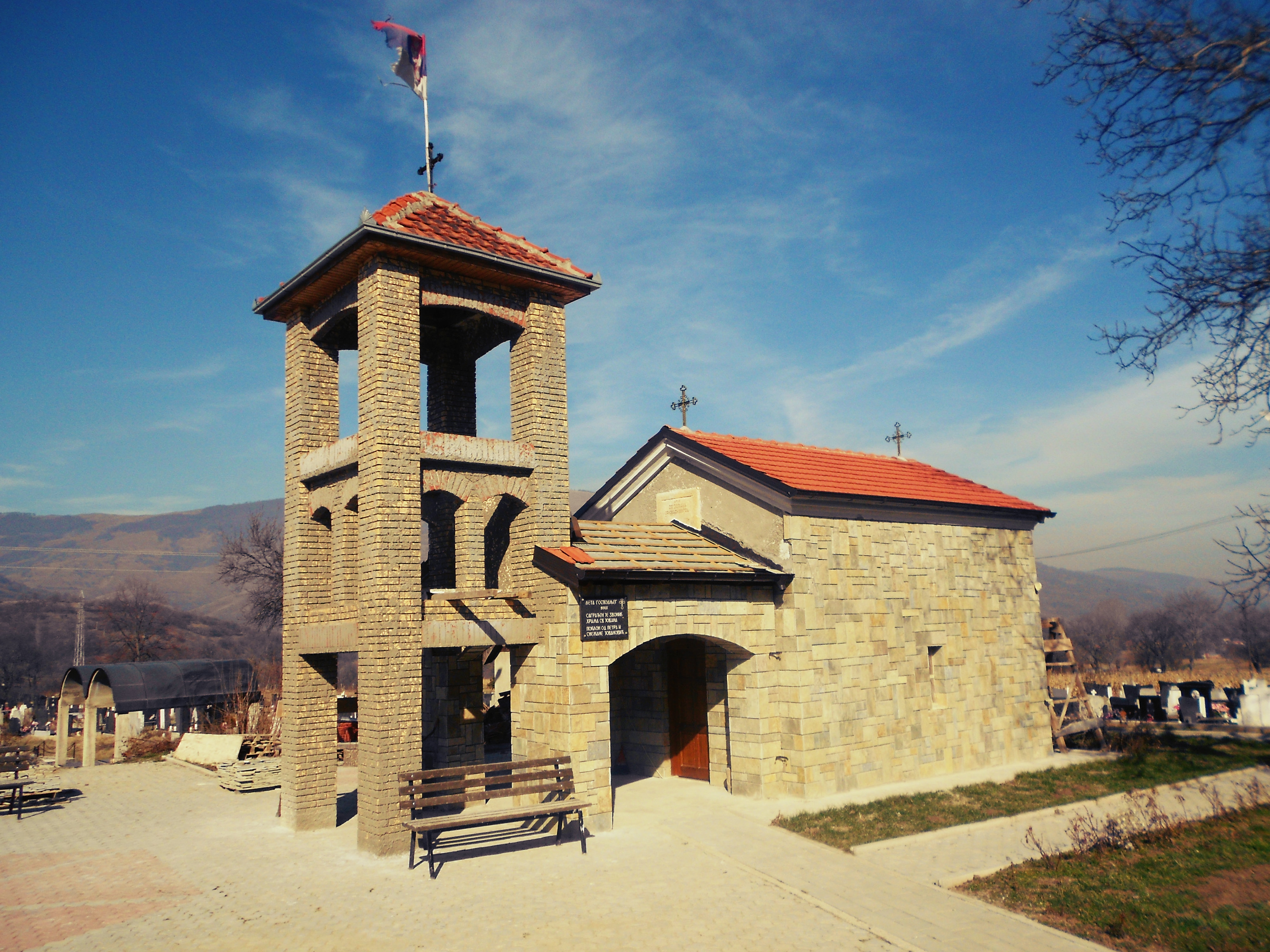
St. John Church

St. John's Church (Serbian: Sv. Jovan) was built in 1911 on the foundation of another unknown church, just as St. Nicholas' Church was built. In 2003, the belfry was added. Inside the church there are frescoes. During 2013 the church was renovated.

=== War memorials ===
The war memorials in Strpce are divided into three separate groups, depending on which period each group belongs to.

- Balkan Wars and World War I memorial
- World War II memorial
- Kosovo War memorial

All of these memorials were built in honor of the people who died fighting for their country. Two of the most decorated warriors were Staja Markovic, after whom the primary school in Strpce is named, and Cvetko Grbic, whose name is borne by the cultural association in Strpce.

== The monuments of other villages in Štrpce municipality ==
The list of cultural monuments in Strpce:

Monuments of Strpce Municipality
Village	Cultural Monuments	Short description
Berevce	Parascheva of the Balkans Church (Serbian: Св. Петка/Sv. Petka)	Located on a hill above Lepenac river. Built in the 16th century.
Brezovica	St. Stephen Church (Serbian: Св. Стефан/Sv. Stefan)	The youngest church in Strpce municipality, built in the 20th century.
Brod	St. Peter Church (Serbian: Св. Петар/Sv. Petar)	Located between two villages, Brod and Firaja.
Vica	St. Demetrios Church (Serbian: Св. Димитрије/Sv. Dimitrije)	Built in the 16th century.
Vrbestica	St. Peter Church (Serbian: Св. Петар/Sv. Petar), St. Ilija Church (Serbian: Св. Илија/Sv. Ilija)	The remains of St. Peter's Church are located in a cave near Vrbestica. St. Ilija's Church was built on the remains of an older temple.
Gornja Bitinja	St. Georgie Church (Serbian: Св. Ђорђе/Sv. Djordje)	Built on the remains of an old church from the 16th century. Renovated in 1920.
Gotovusa	St. Nicholas Church (Serbian: Св. Никола/Sv. Nikola), Virgin Mary Church(Serbian: Богородица/ Bogorodica)	St. Nicholas' Church still has frescos from the 16th century. The Virgin Mary Church was renovated in 1866.
Donja Bitinja	St. Theodor Church (Serbian: Св. Теодор/Sv. Teodor), St. Demetrios Church (Serbian: Св. Димитрије/Sv. Dimitrije)	St. Theodore's Church was built in 1557.
Drajkovce	Mladenci Church (Serbian: Младенци/Maldenci)	Built in the 16th century.
Izanjce	No information available
Jazince	Parascheva of the Balkans Church(Serbian: Св. Петка/Sv. Petka)	Built in the 16th century. Renewed several times.
Kostanjevo	Remains of a church	Remains date from the 14th century. The name of the church in unknown.
Firaja	No information available
Sevce	St. Nicholas Church (Serbian: Св. Никола/Sv. Nikola), St. Archangel (Serbian: Св. Архангел/Sv. Arhangel)	The frescos in St. Nicholas' Church date from the 1860s. St. Archangel Church was built in 1921 on the remains of an old church.
Susice	St. Demetrios Church (Serbian: Св. Димитрије/Sv. Dimitrije)	Only ruins remain.
Source: Geografska enciklopedija naselja Srbije, Srboljub Stamenkovic (2001)

=== Rakanovac monument ===
The Putnice Monument, or the Monument in Rakanovac, was built in honor of the family members of the Sharr Mountains squad killed by the Bulgarian fascists in 1944 during World War II. The monument is located on the road between Strpce and Brezovica, on a field called Rakanovac. It was built by the union of the national liberation movement of Strpce. The monument was reconstructed in 2010 by the municipal board SUBNOR in Strpce. The names of the family members killed are written on the monument, with a poem in their honor. Every year, on 28 June a wreath is laid on the monument for the fallen victims.

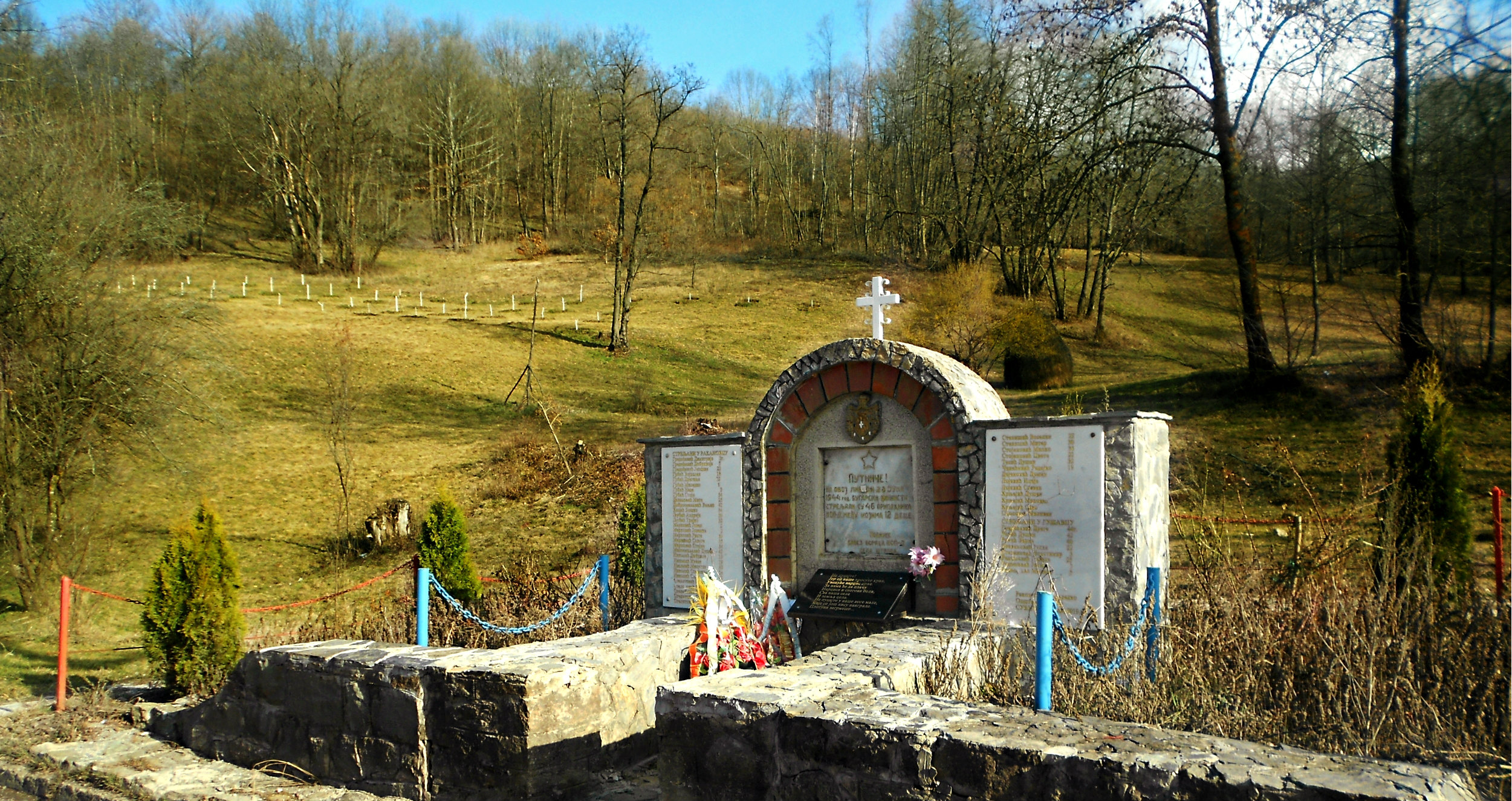
Monument in Rakanovac

==== The story behind the monument ====
During the Bulgarian occupation of Strpce in World War II, there was a Sharr Mountains squad of Serbian resistance fighters. During a secret meeting of the squad, two members of the squad were intercepted by Bulgarian soldiers. The Bulgarian soldiers found out about the meeting from a boy whose father was a Serbian traitor and worked for the Bulgarian forces. One of the Serbian squad members killed one of the Bulgarian soldiers and ran into the mountains, while the other squad member was killed. As an act of revenge for their fallen comrade, Bulgarian fascist soldiers captured all family members of the Sharr Mountains squad, including 12 children. They took them to the St. Nicholas churchyard. At the church they met the father of the dead Bulgarian soldier, who asked the Bulgarian officer not to harm the captured families, but the officer replied that he would execute them all. The officer then agreed not to harm the families, but the next morning when the father went home to Bulgaria, soldiers re-captured all the family members and took them to the place where the soldier had been killed. There they executed them all. When the soldiers were ready to go, they heard the cry of a child. One of the captured children had not died because it was saved by its mother’s body. One of the Bulgarian soldiers went back and killed the child with a bayonet sword. This happened on 28 June 1944. 46 people were executed, including 12 children.

== See also ==
- Monuments of Kosovo
- Berevce
- Brezovica
- Štrpce
