= Viça, Štrpce =

Viça: Viçë (Albanian); Вича/Viča (Serbian)
- Village
- Location in Kosovo
- Coordinates: 42°15′57″N 21°04′50″E
- Location: Kosovo
- District: Ferizaj
- Municipality: Štrpce

Area
  - Total: 0 sq mi (0 km^{2})
- Elevation: 2,421 ft (738 m)

Population (2024)
  - Total: 280
- Time zone: UTC+1 (CET)
  - Summer (DST): UTC+2 (CEST)
- Area code: +381 290
- Car plates: 05

Viça (Albanian definite form: Viçë) or Viča (Serbian Cyrillic: Вича) is a settlement in the Štrpce municipality in Kosovo. It has 280 inhabitants, of whom 140 are Albanians and 140 are Serbs.

== Geography ==
It is situated in the northeastern part of the Sharr Mountains, of which valley sides of the Viča river, a left tributary of the Lepenac. It lies 2 km north of the Prizren-Štrpce-Doganović regional road.

== History ==
In Medieval Serbia, the župa (province) of Siriniq (first mentioned in a charter of the 13th century, the second time in 1331, in a charter of Emperor Stephen Dušan) existed, covering the whole of modern Štrpce municipality, having two cities, Gradište (in Brezovica) and Zidinac (in Gotovuša), near Viča. Several remains of Byzantine forts exist in the region.

The village is part of the ecclesiastical jurisdiction of the Serbian Orthodox Eparchy of Raška and Prizren.

In 1894, the village had 40 houses, of which 35 were Serb, 4 Albanian, and one Islamized Serb.

According to data from 1938, the village had the following kin families, with their number of houses, traditions (Krsna Slava, patron saint day), and history:

- Karadžić (5 houses, Slava of St. Nicholas).
- Velan (12 houses, St. Nicholas), settled from Kabash, in Metohija, at the end of the 18th century.
- Lukačić (12 houses, St. Nicholas) settled from Dragobilje, in Metohija, at the end of the 18th century. Part of their kin family, which stayed in Metohija, converted into Islam after their departure.
- Alilovit (13 houses), an Albanian family, settled from northern Albania in the 19th century, part of the Berisha fis.

Demographic history
| Ethnic group | 1948 | 1953 | 1961 | 1971 | 1981 | 1991 |
|---|---|---|---|---|---|---|
| Serbs | | | | | 219 (50,23%) | |
| Albanians | | | | | 217 (49,77%) | |
| Total | 371 | 402 | 408 | 393 | 436 | 452 |

== Infrastructure ==
The rural settlement has primarily livestock farming (ratarsko-stočarstvo).
