= Berevce =

Berevce: Беревце/Berevce (Serbian); Beroc (Albanian)
- Village
- Location in Kosovo
- Coordinates: 42°14′44″N 21°01′28″E
- Location: Kosovo
- District: Ferizaj
- Municipality: Štrpce
- First mention: 13th century

Area
  - Total: 145.8 km^{2} (56.3 sq mi)
- Elevation: 974 m (3,196 ft)

Population (2024)
  - Total: 583
- Time zone: UTC+1 (CET)
  - Summer (DST): UTC+2 (CEST)
- Area code: +381 290
- Car plates: 05

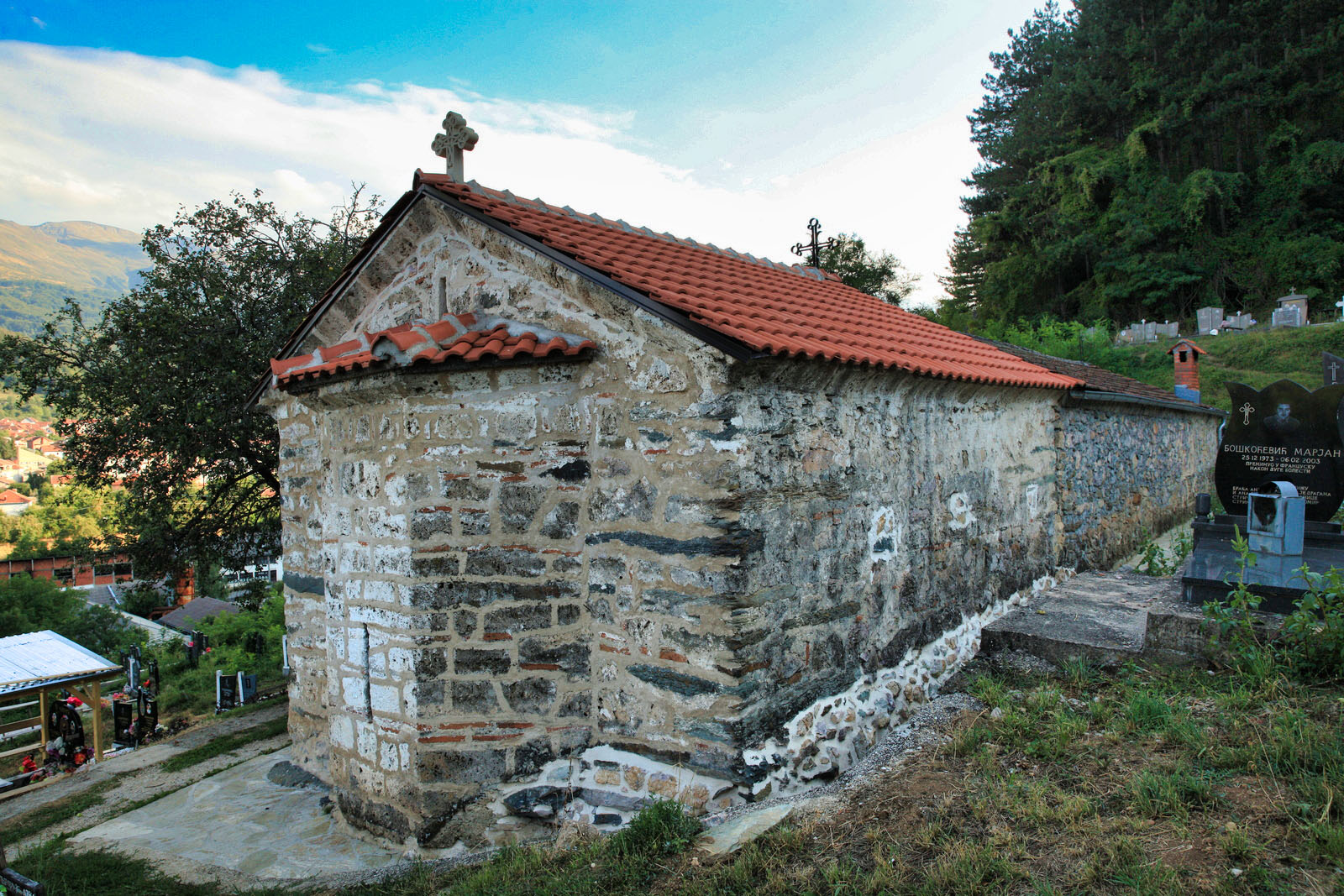
Church of St. Petka in the village of Berevece, Štrpce

Berevce (Serbian Cyrillic: Беревце, Albanian: Beroc) is a settlement in the Štrpce municipality in Kosovo. It is inhabited by ethnic Serbs, according to the 2024 census, it had 583 inhabitants.

== Geography ==
It is situated in the northeastern part of the Šar Mountains, at the foot of a ridge of the Žar Mountain, on the left riverbank of the Lepenac. It is physiognomically like the southern part of Štrpce.

== History ==
In Medieval Serbia, the župa (province) of Sirinić (first mentioned in a charter of the 13th century, the second time in 1331, in a charter of Emperor Stephen Dušan) existed, covering the whole of modern Štrpce municipality, having two cities, Gradište (in Brezovica) and Zidinac (in Gotovuša), near Berevce. Several remains of Byzantine forts exist in the region.

In 1894, the village had 62 houses, all ethnic Serb.

According to data from 1938, the village had the following kin families, with their number of houses, traditions (Krsna Slava, patron saint day), and history:

- Đurinac (13 houses, Slava of St. Nicholas).
- Mutavdžijin (1 house, St. Nicholas).
- Šarkočević (13 houses, St. Nicholas).
- Kovačević (11 houses, Vavedenje), settled from the vicinity of Kaçanik.
- Popović (6 houses), Krpačević (4 houses) and Boško (5 houses), all with the Slava of St. Demetrius. They hail from Montenegro, from where they settled in Mushtisht, in Metohija, then in Berevce at the end of the 18th century. They are kin to the Popović of Gornja Bitinja.

Demographic history
Ethnic group	1948	1953	1961	1971	1981	1991
Serbs					864 (98,63%)	
Others					12 (1,37%)	
Total	682	706	751	846	876	792

== Infrastructure ==
The rural settlement has a cadastre of 1458 hectares, with primarily livestock farming (ratarsko-stočarstvo) and Pomology.
