= Sevce, Štrpce =

Sevce: Sevce (Albanian); Севце/Sevce (Serbian)
- Village
- Interactive map of Sevce
- Coordinates: 42°12′35″N 20°57′24″E
- Location: Kosovo
- District: Ferizaj
- Municipality: Štrpce
- First mention: 1331

Area
  - Total: 0 sq mi (0 km^{2})

Population (2024)
  - Total: 1,192
- Time zone: UTC+1 (CET)
  - Summer (DST): UTC+2 (CEST)
- Area code: +383 290
- Car plates: 05

Sevce (Serbian Cyrillic: Севце) is a settlement in the Štrpce municipality in Kosovo. It is inhabited by ethnic Serbs, according to the 2024 census, it had 1,192 inhabitants.

== Geography ==
It is situated in the northeastern part of the Šar Mountains, in the drainage basin of the Lepenac river.

== History ==
In Medieval Serbia, the župa (province) of Sirinić (first mentioned in a charter of the 13th century, the second time in 1331, in a charter of Emperor Stephen Dušan) existed, covering the whole of modern Štrpce municipality, having two cities, Gradište (in Brezovica) and Zidinac (in Gotovuša), near Sevce. Several remains of Byzantine forts exist in the region. In the charter of Emperor Dušan, Sevce is mentioned as Selce (Селце), a village which was granted (metochion) to the Monastery of St. Peter Koriški, submitted by the Emperor's nobleman Tošoje, as part of his heritage. The village is part of the ecclesiastical jurisdiction of the Serbian Orthodox Eparchy of Raška and Prizren.

In 1894, the village had 140 houses, all ethnic Serb.

According to data from 1938, the village had the following kin families, with their number of houses, traditions (Krsna Slava, patron saint day), and history:

- Šubarić (12 houses, Slava of St. Archangel).
- Bogajčević (8 houses, St. Archangel).
- Cumpalević (11 houses, St. Archangel).
- Markagić (12 houses, St. Archangel).
- Pišmanović (10 houses, St. Archangel).
- Đekić (8 houses, St. Archangel).
- Basarić (19 houses, St. Nicholas).
- Kalpaković (7 houses, St. Nicholas).
- Prljinčević (12 houses, St. Nicholas).
- Bijačević (5 houses, St. Nicholas).
- Jocković (8 houses, St. Nicholas).
- Uzunović (17 houses, St. George).
- Daćevac (16 houses, St. George).
- Sinikovac (16 houses, St. George).
- Ašujin (4 houses, St. Nicholas), very old migrants from Boka Kotorska.
- Đelić (5 houses, St. George), settled from Želina, in Polog, in the mid 18th-century

== Demographics ==
Demographic history
Ethnic group	1948	1953	1961	1971	1981	1991	2011	2024
Serbs					1227 (99.92%)		174 (98.86%)	1190 (99.98%)
Others					1 (0.08%)		2 (1.14%)	2 (0.02%)
Total	1049	1127	1120	1223	1228	1283	176	1192

Serbs boycott 2011 census.

== Infrastructure ==
The rural settlement has primarily livestock farming (ratarsko-stočarstvo).

== See also ==
- Svetomir Arsić-Basara (b. 1928), acclaimed Serbian sculptor, member of the Serbian Academy of Sciences and Arts, born in Sevce

== Sources ==
- Annuaire, Volume 1, Univerzitet vo Skopje. Prirodno-matematički oddel, Oddel, 1 January 1948
