= Nerodimka (mountain) =

Mountain in Kosovo

- Nerodime
- Location within Kosovo

Highest point
- Elevation: 1,721 m (5,646 ft)
- Coordinates: 42°18′35″N 20°59′07″E

Naming
- Native name: Неродимка (Serbian); Nerodimja (Albanian)

Geography
- Location: Kosovo
- Parent range: 42.309626,20.985253

The Nerodimka (Serbian Cyrillic: Неродимка) or Nerodime (Albanian definite form: Nerodimja) is a mountain range located in the south of Kosovo. It is named after the Serbian legend of the woman who cannot deliver a baby (Serbian: Неродимка / Nerodimka, meaning "woman who cannot give birth"). The mountain has two high peaks, Bukova Glava 1,721 m (5,646 ft) and Kurkulica 1,549 m (5,082 ft).

== Geography ==
The Nerodimka/Nerodime mountains are located just a few kilometers north of the Sharr Mountains, only split by the Siriniq Valley. Nerodime forms a continuous east–west range along with the mountains of Zhar and Jezerska Planina between the cities of Prizren and Ferizaj. In the mountain originates the Nerodime river, a left tributary of the Lepenc. Many small streams originate on the mountain and then flow downwards to meet the Lepenc.

== Cities, towns and villages ==
Cities located near the mountain are:

- Ferizaj (north-east)

Towns located near the mountain are:

- Mushtisht (west)
- Gremë (east)
- Shtërpcë (south)

Villages located near the mountain are:

- Nerodimja e Epërme (north-east)
- Jezerc (north)
- Bukosh (west)
- Gaçkë (south-east)
- Brezovicë (south)
- Burrnik (south)
