= Nerodimka =

Nerodimka may refer to:

- Nerodimka (mountain), a mountain in Kosovo
- Nerodimka (river), a river in Kosovo
