= Jažince =

Jažince may refer to:

- Jažince, Štrpce, Kosovo
- Jažince, Jegunovce, North Macedonia
