= Gotovuša =

Gotovushë: Gotovushë (Albanian); Готовуша/Gotovuša (Serbian)
- Village
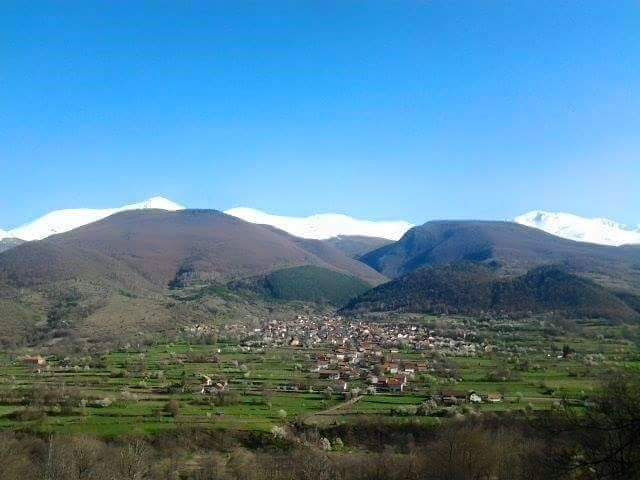
- View of Gotovuša

- Location in Serbia
- Coordinates: 42°14′55″N 21°4′22″E
- Location: Kosovo
- District: District of Ferizaj
- Municipality: Štrpce
- First mention: 1455

Area
  - Total: 62.2 sq mi (161.1 km^{2})
- Elevation: 3,491 ft (1,064 m)

Population (2024)
  - Total: 892
- Time zone: UTC+1 (CET)
  - Summer (DST): UTC+2 (CEST)
- Area code: +383 44|49|45|43|38

Gotovuša (Serbian Cyrillic: Готовуша, Albanian: Gotovushë) is a settlement in the Štrpce municipality in Kosovo. It is inhabited by ethnic Serbs, according to the 2024 census, it had 892 inhabitants. The village houses two churches, protected by the Republic of Kosovo.

== Geography ==
It is situated in the northeastern part of the Šar Mountains, and in the drainage basin of the Lepenac river.

== History ==
In Medieval Serbia, the župa (province) of Sirinić (first mentioned in 1331, in a charter of Emperor Stephen Dušan) existed, covering the whole of modern Štrpce municipality, having two cities, Gradište (in Brezovica) and Zidinac (in Gotovuša). Several remains of Byzantine forts exist in the region.

Gotovuša is mentioned for the first time in an Ottoman defter (tax register) of 1455, as a great village with 64 houses, and an Orthodox priest. The Church of Saint Nicholas was built here in the mid-16th-century, and is currently under protection of the Republic of Serbia as part of the Monuments of Culture of Exceptional Importance (Cultural Heritage of Serbia-list, SK 1422), in the Churches of Sirinićka župa-group. The second church in Gotovuša is dedicated to the Entry of the Most Holy Theotokos (Uspenja Presvete Bogorodice), built in 1557. Above the village, near the old fort of Zidinac, there are remains of several older churches. The village is part of the ecclesiastical jurisdiction of the Serbian Orthodox Eparchy of Raška and Prizren.

In 1894, the village had 87 houses, all ethnic Serb.

According to data from 1938, the village had the following kin families, with their number of houses, traditions (Krsna Slava, patron saint day), and history:

- Bugarkin (4 houses, Slava of Sv. Petka). A male ancestor married a Bulgarian wife on pečalba (seasonal migrational work), hence their surname (meaning "of the [female] Bulgarian").
- Kosmoćević (18 houses, Sv. Petka).
- Đurđević and Kućanović (18 houses, Sv. Petka).
- Kevkić (25 houses) and Toroćev (23 houses), both with the Slava of Sv. Nikole, settled in the end of the 18th century from the village of Seroja, near Shkodër. The Kevkić family heads were, in chronological manner starting from the nearest: Dobrosav (aged 90 in 1938), Simeon, Milenko, Stevan.
- Projčević (2 houses, Sv. Nikole), settled from Polog. Before their arrival, they had the Slava of Sv. Arhanđela, but as they were the only ones in the village with that Slava, and poor, they could not continue with having guests, so they changed their Slava to Sv. Nikole, which some other families had as Slava.
- Stojčević (8 houses, Sv. Arhanđeo), also settled from Polog.
- Čantrić (24 houses, Sv. Petka), settled from Semanje near Kaçanik around 1830. They hail from Burnik near Ferizaj.

== Demographics ==
Demographic history
Ethnic group	1948	1953	1961	1971	1981	1991	2011	2024
Serbs					971 (98,58%)		445 (100%)	878 (98,46%))
Others					14 (1,42%)			14 (1,57%)
Total	697	779	839	906	985	986	445	892

Serbs boycott 2011. census

== Infrastructure ==
The settlement is in the territory of a cadastre of 1611 hectares. The village has a primary school, "Рајко Урошевић".
