= Svetomir Arsić-Basara =

Serbian sculptor and writer (1928–2024)

- Светомир Арсић-Басара
- Born: 15 May 1928; Sevce, Štrpce, Kingdom of Serbs, Croats, and Slovenes
- Died: 10 May 2024 (aged 95); Belgrade, Serbia
- Education: Academy of Applied Arts
- Occupations: Sculptor; Writer

Svetomir Arsić-Basara (Serbian: Светомир Арсић Басара; 15 May 1928 – 10 May 2024) was a Serbian writer and sculptor.

== Biography ==
Born in Sevce on 15 May 1928, Arsić-Basara attended secondary school in Kosovska Mitrovica. In 1953, he was admitted to the Academy of Applied Arts, from where he graduated in March 1958. In 1962, he began teaching sculpture and plastic arts in Pristina. From 1973 to 1995, he taught in the sculpture department at the Academy of Arts of Pristina.

In 1958, Arsić-Basara opened an artist colony in Dečani. In 2000, a symposium on his works was held at the Institute for Serbian Culture Pristina - Leposavić. Additionally, he authored studies on sculpture, literary criticism, and short stories.

Svetomir Arsić-Basara died in Belgrade on 10 May 2024, at the age of 95.

== Works ==
- Korito, short story, Priština, 1998
- Put za Dečane, short story collection, Belgrade, 2023
