= Kurkulica =

Mountain in Kosovo

Coordinates: 42.31274°N 21.07299°E

Kurkulica (Albanian: Turtullesha) (Turtle Dove) is a mountain in Kosovo. Its height is 1,549 m (5,082 ft) and is one of the highest peaks of the Nerodimka Mountains. Kurkulica is covered on all sides with dense forest except for a small area at the summit, making it ideal for large carnivores that are endangered species in the rest of Europe.
