= Sirinićka župa =

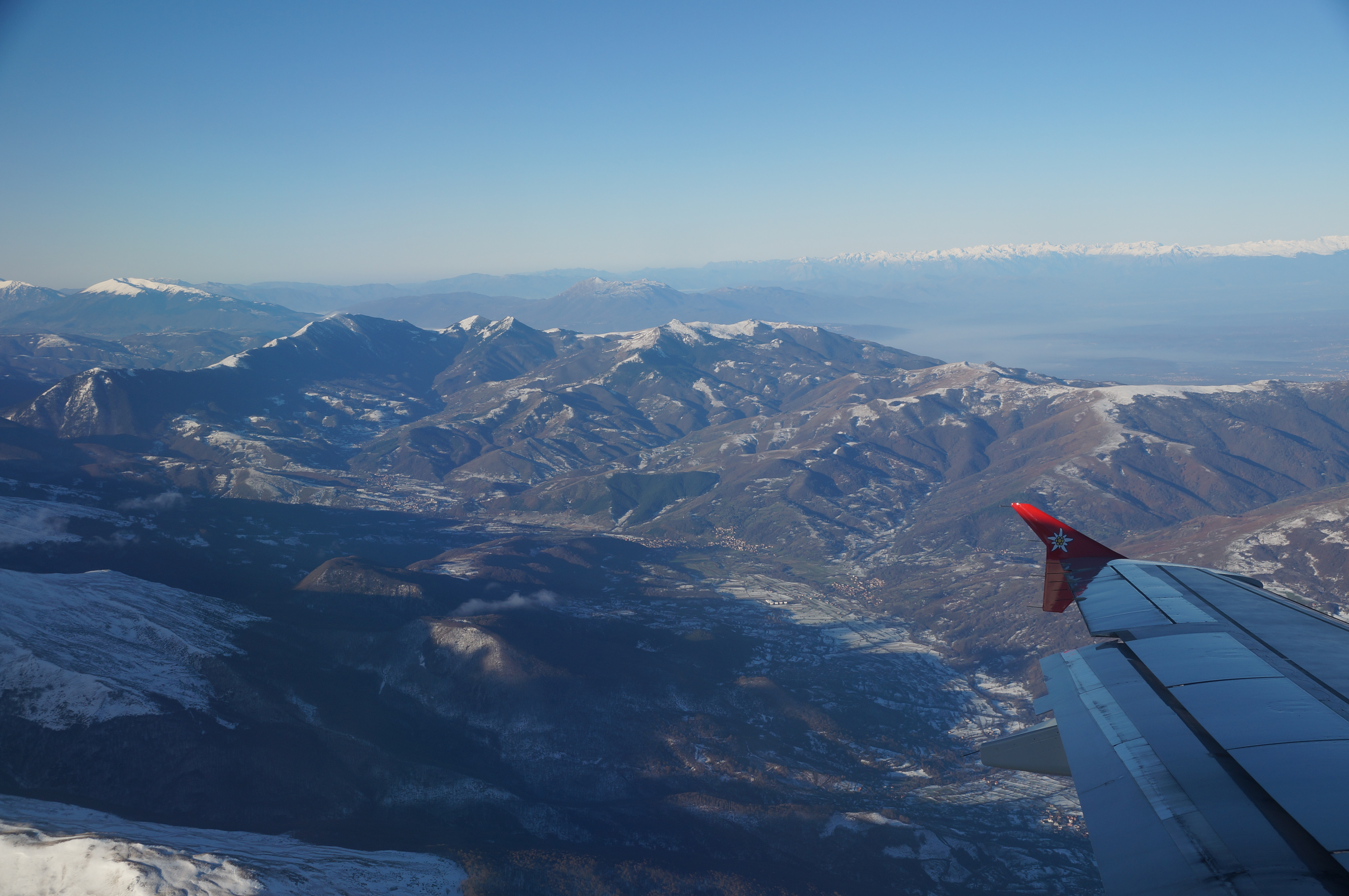
The Sirinić Valley seen towards the west.

Sirinić or Siriniq (Serbian Cyrillic: Сиринић, Albanian: Siriniqi) is a term used for a historical region that covers 247 km^{2} (95 sq mi), including all of the Štrpce municipality in Kosovo, the borders of which it mostly overlaps. In the past it functioned as the Sirinićka Župa (community of villages, a county) of Medieval Serbia. The region is inhabited mostly by ethnic Serbs, who, as a result of isolation, have maintained archaic folk customs, folklore and language.

== Geography ==
It is situated in the northeastern part of the Šar Mountains, and in the drainage basin of the Lepenac river. The highest peak is 2,500 m (8,200 ft) above sea level.

== History ==
Sirinić was first mentioned in a charter of the 13th century, the second time in 1331, in a charter of Emperor Stephen Dušan. At that time, it covered the whole of modern Štrpce municipality, having two cities, Gradište (in Brezovica) and Zidinac (in Gotovuša). Several remains of Byzantine forts exist in the region.In the charter of Emperor Dušan, Sevce is mentioned as Selce (Селце), a village which was granted (metochion) to the Monastery of St. Peter Koriški, submitted by the Emperor's nobleman Tošoje, as part of his heritage. Other toponyms in this region mentioned in the charter are: Blatinišica, Lepenac, Piljev potok, Borov vrh, Katunište and Ostrovica.

In Brezovica, at the top of the Čajlije hill, above the mouth of the Piljevac creek of the Lepenac river, there exists the remains of the Gradište fort, which has two layers, the first from the 6th century, and the second from the 13th century. The fort is in ruins, of which a donjon tower, and outlines of other buildings, can be identified. The entrance to the city, at the north, was protected by a tower. From that tower, a rampart continued, with another tower, from where a defensive wall stretched to the foot of the hill, towards the Lepenac.

Gotovuša is mentioned for the first time in an Ottoman defter (tax register) of 1455, as a great village with 64 houses, and an Orthodox priest. The Church of Saint Nicholas was built here in the mid-16th-century, and is currently under protection of the Republic of Serbia as part of the Monuments of Culture of Exceptional Importance (Cultural Heritage of Serbia-list, SK 1422), in the Churches of Sirinićka župa-group. The second church in Gotovuša is dedicated to the Entry of the Most Holy Theotokos (Uspenja Presvete Bogorodice), built in 1557. Above the village, near the old fort of Zidinac, there are remains of several older churches.

The village of Berevce has two cathedrals of the 16th century: the Church of Parascheva, and the Church of St. Demetrius. The Church of Parascheva is in good shape, it was renovated in 1960s when a new bell was built. In the 13th century, the church was a notable literary center in which noted deacon Ravul wrote in; his manuscripts today exist in museums of Dublin.
