= Dardan Çerkini =

Kosovar footballer

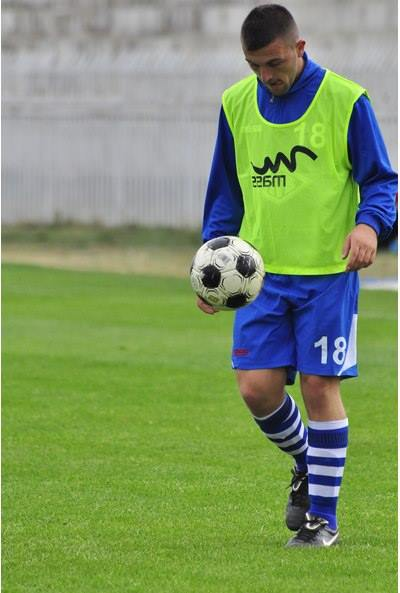

Personal information
- Full name: Dardan Çerkini
- Date of birth: 27 September 1991 (age 35)
- Place of birth: Brod, Shtërpcë, SFR Yugoslavia (now Kosovo)
- Height: 1.80 m (5 ft 11 in)
- Position: Left midfielder

Team information
- Current team: Dinamo Ferizaj
- Number: 3

Youth career
- 2008–2010: Ferizaj

Senior career*
Years	Team	Apps	(Gls)
2010–2015	Ferizaj	38	(13)
2015–2016	Drita	11	(8)
2016–2017	Flamurtari	15	(9)
2017–2018	Ferizaj	19	(9)
2018–2019	Trepça'89	3	(0)
2019–2021	Ferizaj	59	(6)
2021	Vitia	0	(0)
2021–2023	Ferizaj	15	(1)
2023–	Dinamo Ferizaj		
- * Club domestic league appearances and goals as of 16 July 2025

Dardan Çerkini (born 27 September 1991) is a Kosovar footballer who plays as a defender for KF Dinamo Ferizaj in the Kosovo First League.

== Career ==
On 6 January 2016, he signed with Flamurtari of the Kategoria Superiore.

Çerkini re-joined KF Ferizaj on 31 January 2019.
