= Church of St. Nicholas, Štrpce =

Coordinates: 42.248611°N 21.072778°E

Church of St. Nicholas
- Црква светог Николе; Kisha e Shën Kollit
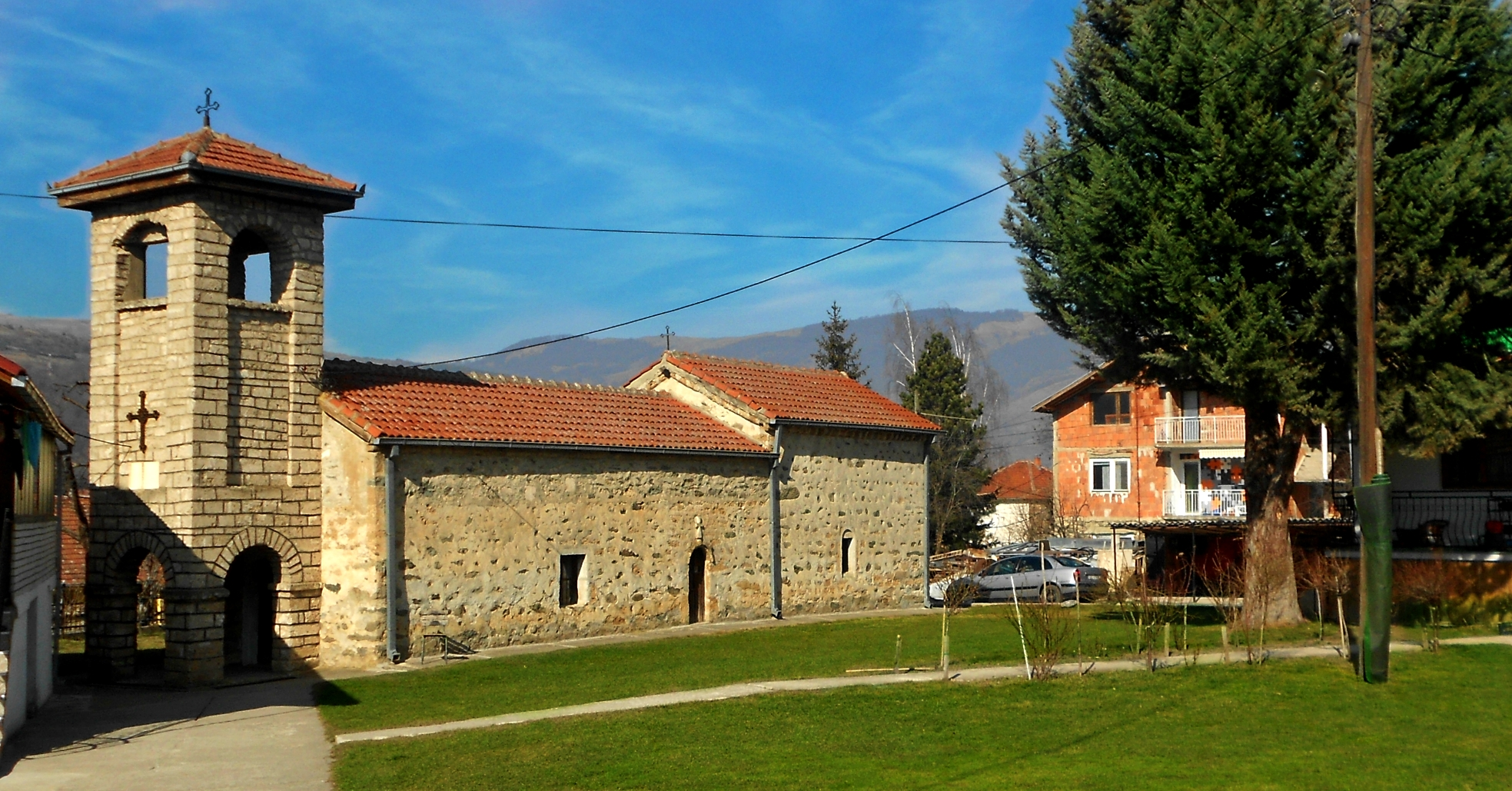

- Location in Kosovo
- Location: Štrpce, Kosovo
- Denomination: Serbian Orthodox Church

History
- Status: Church
- Founded: 1500s
- Dedication: St. Demetrius, formerly St. Nicholas

Architecture
- Heritage designation: Monument of Culture of Exceptional Importance Serbia

Administration
- Diocese: Eparchy of Raška and Prizren

The Church of St. Nicholas (Serbian: Црква светог Николе/Crkva svetog Nikole; Albanian: Kisha e Shën Kollit is a Serbian Orthodox church built in the mid-16th century, located in Štrpce, Kosovo.

== See also ==
- Cultural monuments of the Kosovo district
