= Nerodime (river) =

Bifurcated river in Kosovo

Nerodime Неродимка
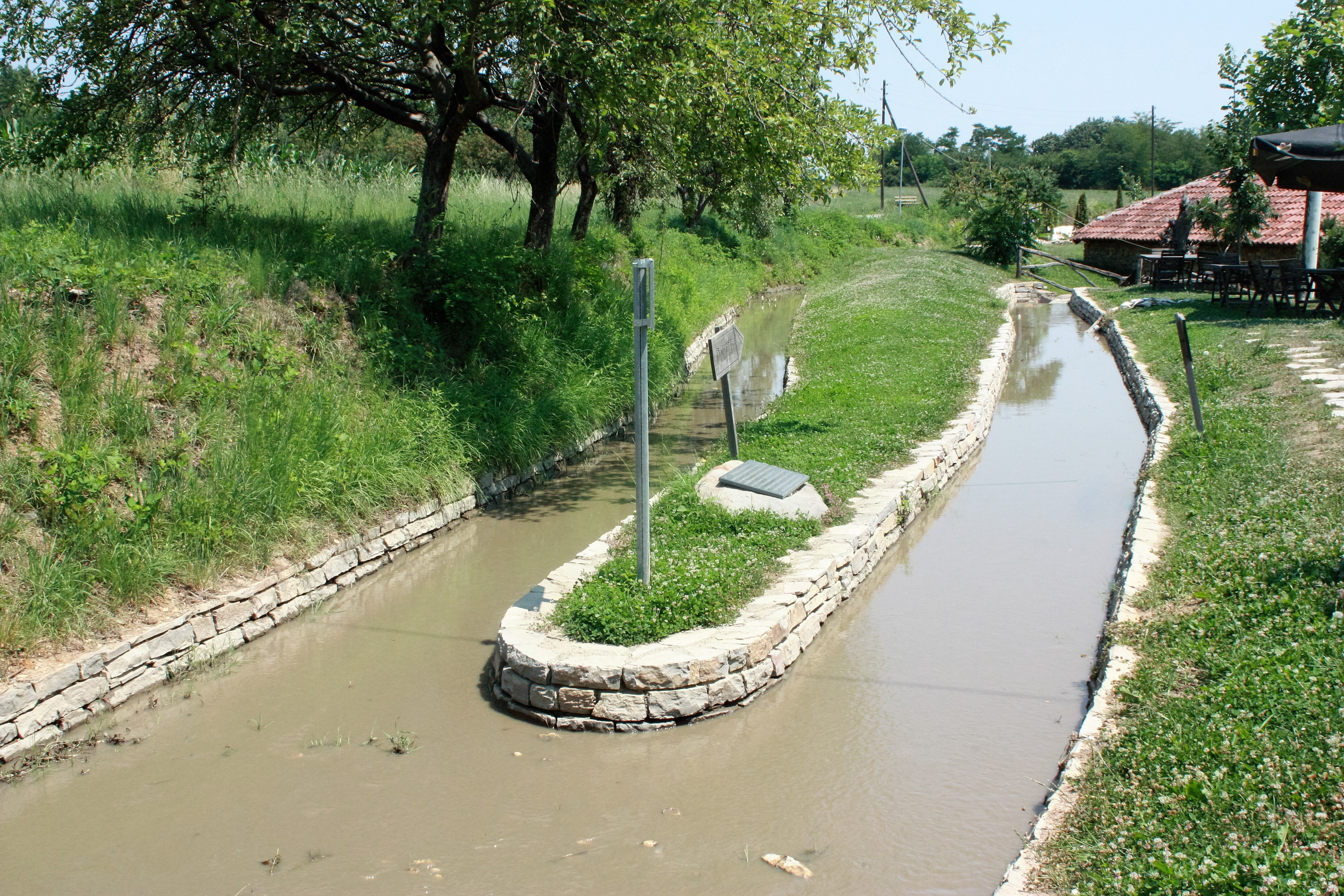
- Bifurcation of Nerodime river

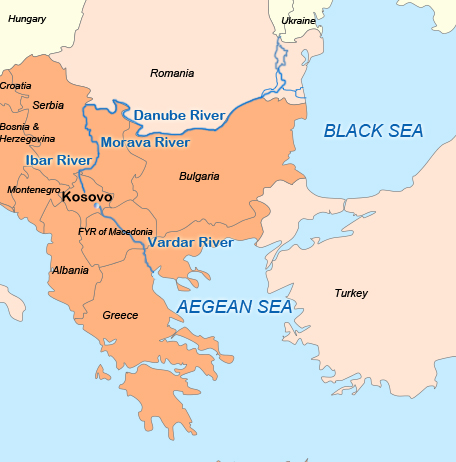
- Map showing the Nerodime bifurcation to the Aegean and Black Sea

Location
- Country: Kosovo
- District: District of Ferizaj
- Municipality: Ferizaj

Physical characteristics
- Source
  - location: Nerodimka mountain
  - coordinates: 42.348424°N 20.975935°E
- Mouth
  - location: with Drenica to Sitnica at Ferizaj (Black Sea branch) / Lepenac, at Kaçanik (Aegean branch)
  - coordinates: 42.615833°N 21.068836°E / 42.2253°N 21.2573°E
- Length: 41 km (25 mi)
- Basin size: 229 km^{2} (88 sq mi)

Basin features
- Progression: Ibar→ Danube→ Black Sea / Lepenac→ Vardar→ Aegean Sea
- River system: Aegean / Black Sea
- Landmarks: River bifurcation
- Bifurcation point: 42.372148°N 21.119610°E

The Nerodime (Albanian: Nerodimja or Nerodime; Serbian Cyrillic: Неродимка) is a river in the Nerodime region of Kosovo, a 41 km (25 mi) long left tributary to the Lepenc river. It represents Europe's only instance of a river bifurcation flowing into two seas, dividing into two irreversible branches. The left branch flows into the Black Sea, and the right branch flows into the Aegean Sea.

== Geography ==
The Nerodime river rises as Golema Reka in the Nerodime mountain and is formed by the two main tributaries, Golema (Velika) Reka and Mala Reka. They join near the village of Nerodime e Epërme (Gornje Nerodimlje). From there it flows west-east direction, and the basin bifurcation occurs at the outskirts of Ferizaj. The northern branch drains into the Sitnica and via the Iber, Morava and Danube ultimately into the Black Sea, while the main, southern branch, joins with another branch of the Nerodime river and together continue the journey to the Aegean Sea via the Lepenc and Vardar rivers.

After the major settlement of southern Kosovo, the town of Ferizaj, the Nerodime turns south and flows next to the villages of Varosh, Komoglava, Kacanik, Stagovo and Runjevo, before it reaches the town of Kacanik and empties into the Lepenec river.

The bifurcation is actually an artificial phenomenon, as the connection was achieved by digging an artificial canal, but the downstream water flow is still natural. In the 14th century a canal connecting the Sazlia pond and the river Nerodime was dug, creating an artificial bifurcation, since the Nerodime flows to the south into the Lepenec river and thus belongs to the Aegean Sea drainage basin, while the Sitnica (which is an outflow of the Sazlia) flows to the north, into the Iber river and belongs to the Black Sea drainage basin. After World War II, the canal was covered with earth again as it was previously mudded as a result of the lack of maintenance.

These water flows have separate impact in annual temperatures of this region. The average annual temperature is 9.9 °C. Warmest months are July and August, with average temperature 18.9 °C. The coldest month is January, with an average temperature -2.6 °C. Maximum air temperature is 32.5 °C in July, while the minimum -14.0 °C in January.

Atmospheric precipitation also plays a role of abundance water in Nerodime river. The average of rainfalls for every month is 73.3 mm. Months with the most rainfalls are April–May, 105.6 mm, while at least August with 42.2 mm.

== Development strategies and protection ==
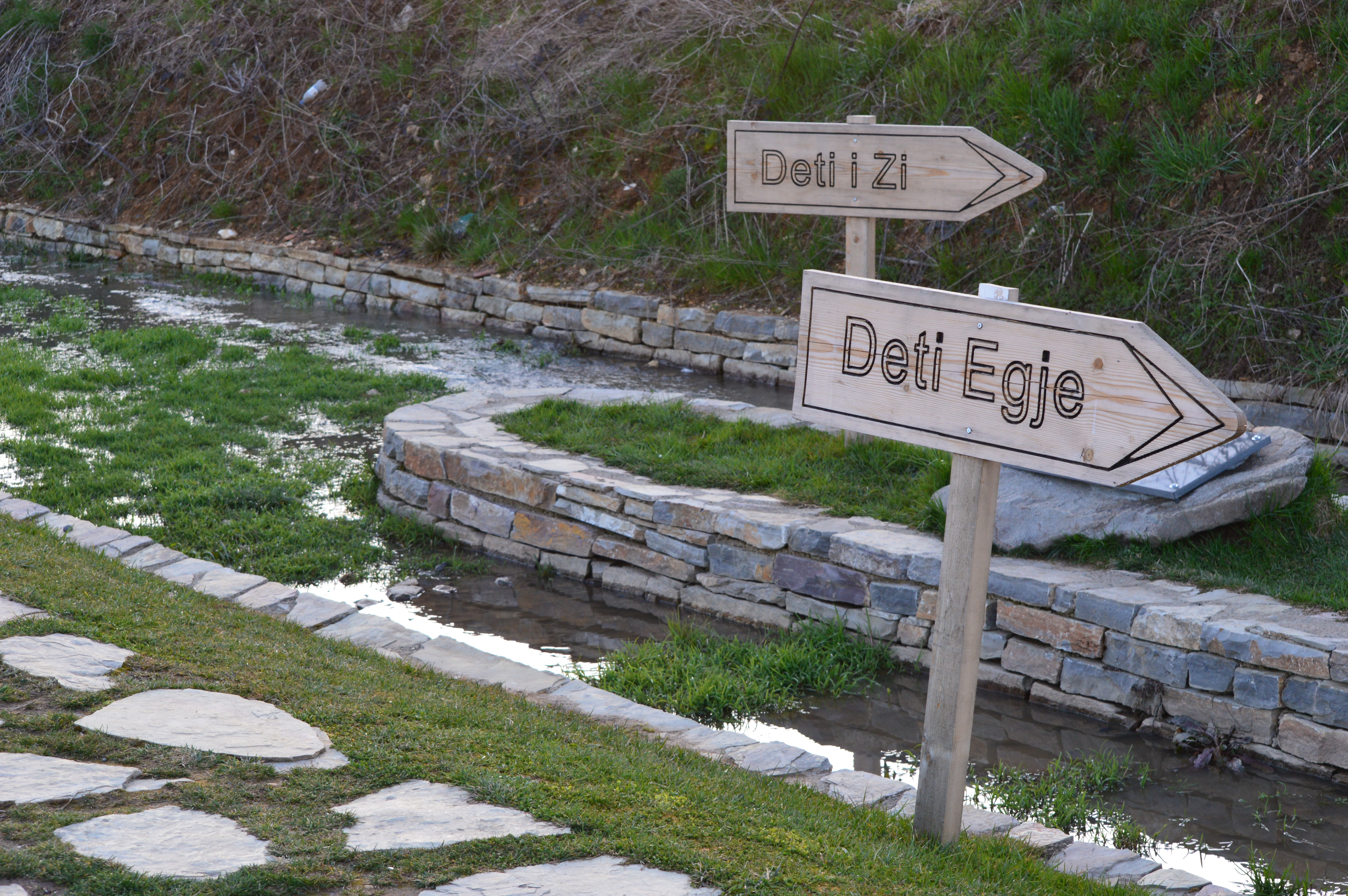
Signs at the point of the Nerodime bifurcation

The bifurcation of Nerodime has been under state protection since 1979, and it is declared as a strict wildlife sanctuary, first category according to (IUCN) The official emblem of the municipality of Ferizaj contains the visual representation of the Nerodime river bifurcation.

This phenomenon is attractive for researchers and visitors and has great importance to education, science and tourism. The western part of the city offers ideal conditions for the formation of public green spaces (parks), for the development of tourism and recreation. Branch of Nerodime River enters within the city, extensive recreational area that is also available to residents of Ferizaj bifurcation area, waterfall and the merger of the two rivers.

The Nerodime drains an area of 229 km^{2} (88 sq mi) itself, and it is not navigable.
