= Jažince, Štrpce =

Jažince
- Village
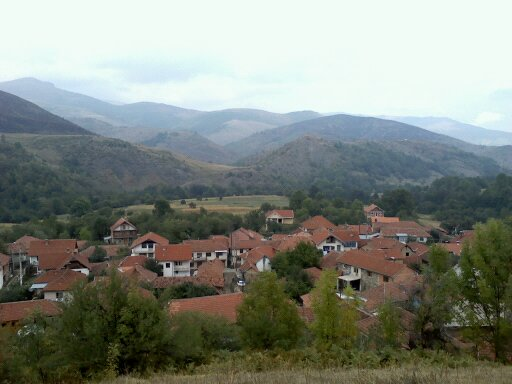
- Jažince

- Location in Kosovo
- Coordinates: 42°14′44″N 21°01′28″E
- Location: Kosovo
- District: Ferizaj
- Municipality: Štrpce

Population (2024)
  - Total: 692
- Time zone: UTC+1 (CET)
  - Summer (DST): UTC+2 (CEST)
- Car plates: 05

Jažince (Serbian Cyrillic: Јажинце, Albanian: Jazhincë) is a settlement in the Štrpce municipality in Kosovo. At the time of the 2024 census it had 692 inhabitants.
