= Brezovica, Kosovo =

Брезовица Brezovicë
- Settlement
- Brezovica
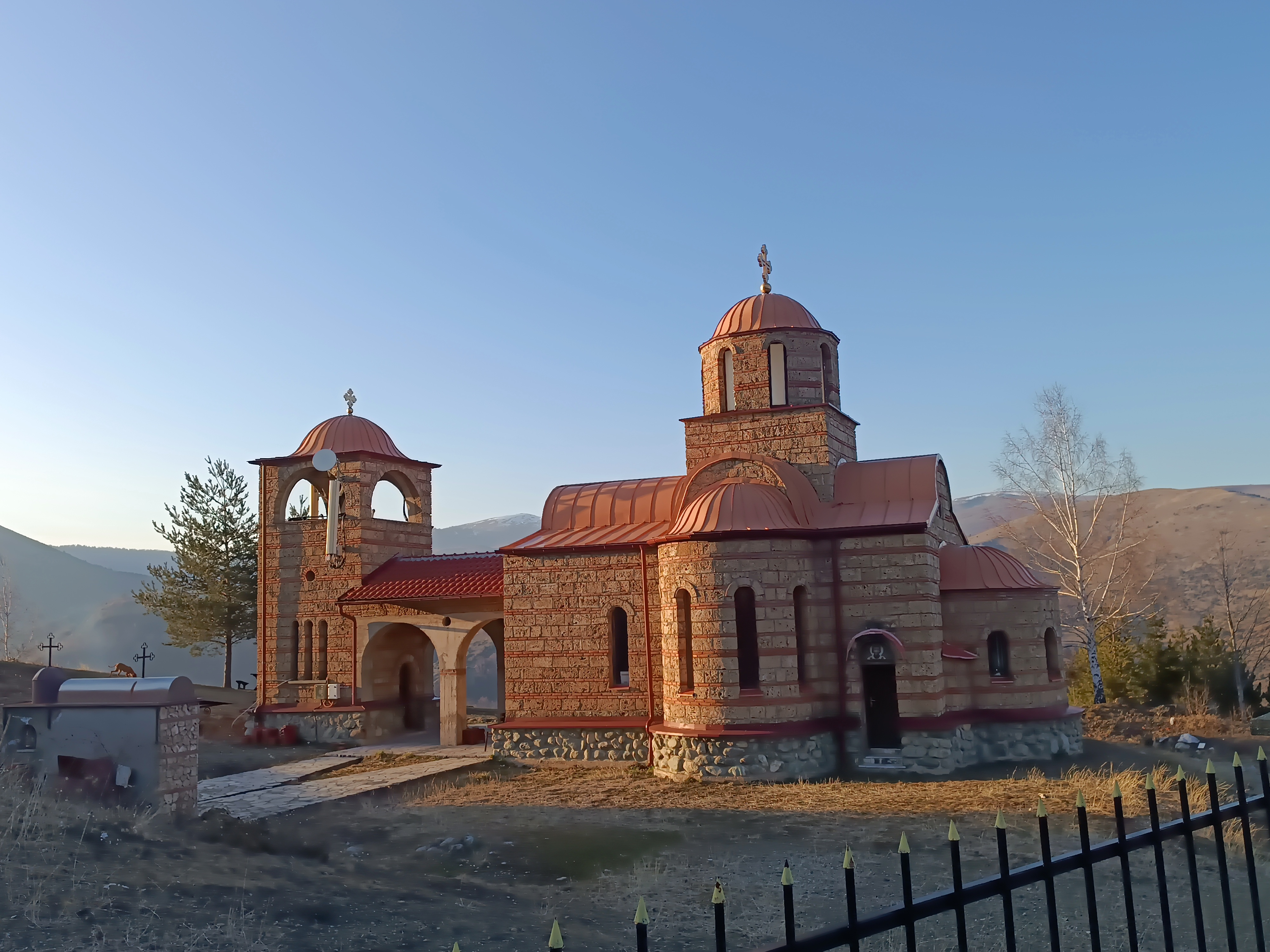
- St. Stephen's Church in Brezovica

- Location in Kosovo
- Coordinates: 42°13′19″N 21°00′17″E
- Country: Kosovo
- District: Ferizaj
- Municipality: Štrpce

Area
  - Total: 80 km^{2} (31 sq mi)
- Elevation: 1,015 m (3,330 ft)

Population (2024)
  - Total: 942
  - Density: 12/km^{2} (30/sq mi)
- Time zone: UTC+1 (CET)
  - Summer (DST): UTC+2 (CEST)
- Postal code: 38357/38157
- Area code: +383 290/+381 0290
- Car plates: 05/UR

Brezovica (Serbian Cyrillic: Брезовица, Albanian indefinite form: Brezovicë) is a settlement in the Štrpce municipality in Kosovo, known for its Brezovica ski resort. According to the 2024 Census, Brezovica's total population is 942.

Brezovica is one of the most visited winter tourist destinations in Kosovo. The ski resort area is ideally situated on the north and northwest-facing slopes of the Šar Mountains National Park. The ridge line spans 39,000 hectares of high alpine mountain terrain and forests, with a highly diverse and abundant flora and fauna. Located within 90 minutes of two international airports, the Brezovica resort area represents one of the last remaining under-developed ski resort areas in Southeast Europe.

== Geography ==
It is situated in the northeastern part of the Šar Mountains, and in the drainage basin of the Lepenac river. The Brezovica ski resort is situated between 900 m and 2,500 m above sea level, about 14 km south of the village. There is a combination of mild valley climate in the lower parts and Alpine climate in the higher regions.

== History ==
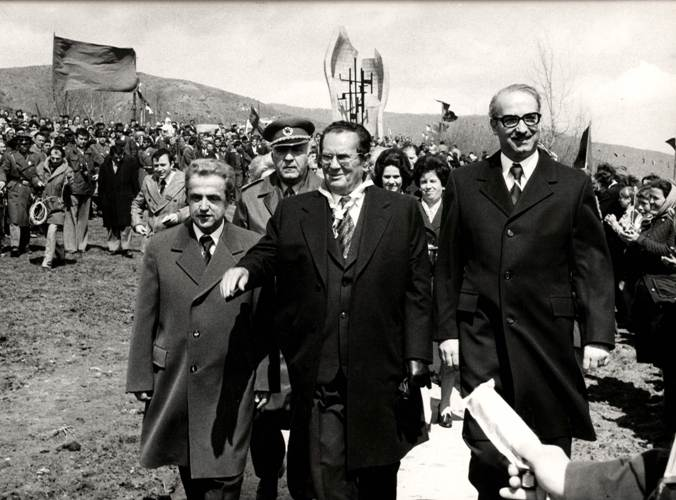
President of Yugoslavia Josip Broz Tito visiting Brezovica in 1975.

In Medieval Serbia, the župa (province) of Sirinić (first mentioned in a charter of the 13th century, the second time in 1331, in a charter of Emperor Stephen Dušan) existed, covering the whole of modern Štrpce municipality, having the cities of Gradište (in Brezovica) and Zidinac (in Gotovuša). Several remains of Byzantine forts exist in the region.

At the top of the Čajlije hill, above the mouth of the Piljevac creek of the Lepenac river, there exists the remains of the Gradište fort, which has two layers, the first from the 6th century, and the second from the 13th century. The fort is in ruins, of which a donjon tower, and outlines of other buildings, can be identified. The entrance to the city, at the north, was protected by a tower. From that tower, a rampart continued, with another tower, from where a defensive wall stretched to the foot of the hill, towards the Lepenac.

On 28 June 1944, during Bulgarian occupation of this area, Bulgarian soldiers executed 46 locals (of whom 12 were children) at Rakanovac, near Brezovica, after the death of one of their soldiers.

Church of St. Stephen in Brezovica was built from 1997 to 2001, as an endowment by doctor Rastko Aleksandrov Batasha.

== Demographics ==
Demographic history
Ethnic group	1981	2011	2024
Serbs	323 (98.48%)	44 (67.71%)	942 (100%)
Albanians		23 (33.82%)	
Others	5 (1.53%)	1 (1.47%)	
Total	328	68	942

Serbs boycott 2011 census.
