= Lepenac =

River in Kosovo and North Macedonia

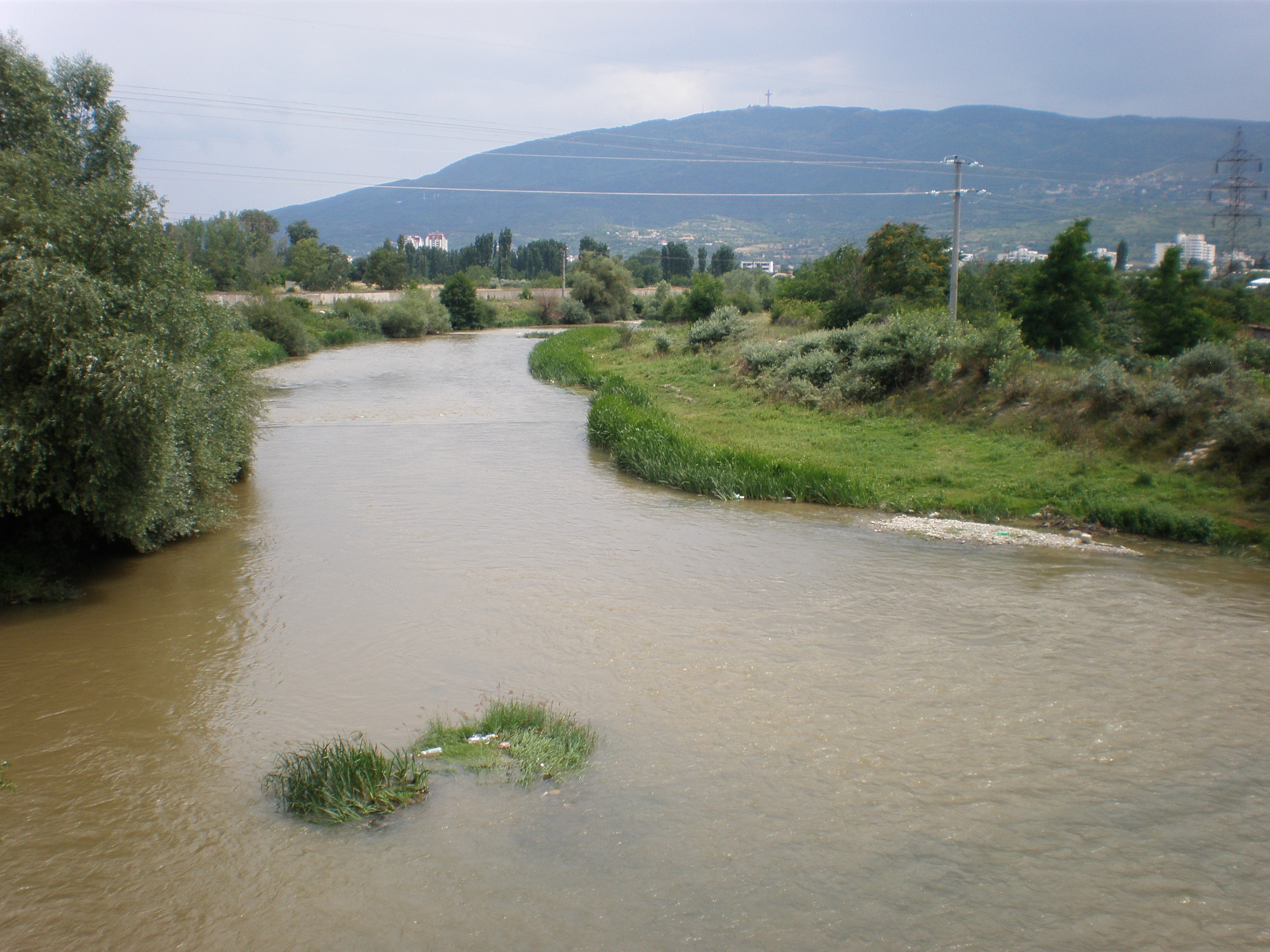
- Lepenac through North Macedonia
- Native name: Lepenci (Albanian); Лепенац (Macedonian); Лепенац (Serbian)

Location
- Countries: Kosovo; North Macedonia
- Cities: Štrpce; Kaçanik; Hani i Elezit; Skopje

Physical characteristics
- Source
  - location: Oshlak mountain, Kosovo
  - elevation: 1,833 m (6,014 ft) (source)
- Mouth
  - location: Vardar, at Skopje, North Macedonia
  - coordinates: 42.0128°N 21.3831°E
  - elevation: 262 m (860 ft)
- Length: 75 km (47 mi)
- Basin size: 770 km^{2} (300 sq mi)

Basin features
- Progression: Vardar→ Aegean Sea

The Lepenac (Albanian: Lepenc; Macedonian: Лепенец; Serbian: Лепенац, Lepenac) is a river in southern Kosovo and northern North Macedonia, a 75 km (47 mi) long left tributary to the Vardar river.

== Course ==
=== Kosovo ===
The Lepenac springs out on the Oshlak mountain, east of the city of Prizren, at an altitude of 1,833 m (6,014 ft). It flows eastward, into the region of Sirinićka župa, between the Žar mountain from the north and alongside the northern slopes of the Šar Mountains from the south. From the Šar Mountains it receives many small tributaries, most notably the Suva reka, as it passes next to the villages of Sevce and Jazhincë, the ski resort of Brezovica and a small town and regional center of Štrpce.

The Lepenac continues between the Šar Mountains in the south and Nerodimka mountain in the north, next to the villages of Biti e Poshtëme, Gotovushë, Brod and Doganaj, where the river makes an elbow turn to the south, entering the Kosovo field.

For several kilometers the Lepenac flows parallel to the Nerodime river, flows next to the villages of Kovaçefc and Bob, and receives its major tributary the Nerodime from the left at the town of Kaçanik, at the beginning of the Kaçanik Gorge.

The gorge, as the narrowest part of the Lepenac river valley, is located between the Sharr Mountains on the west and Skopska Crna Gora on the east and connects the Kosovo field and Skopje valley. The gorge is 23 km (14 mi) long, carved in the limestone and slate terrain. Higher parts of the gorge are actually formed by the ancient outflow of the now extinct lake. The village of Pustenik and small town of Hani i Elezit are located in the gorge. After Hani i Elezit, the Lepenac becomes a border river between Kosovo and Macedonia, before it leaves the gorge after the village of Seçishtë and leaves Kosovo after the course of 60 km (37 mi).

=== North Macedonia ===
For the remaining 15 km (9 mi), the Lepenac flows through the low Skopje valley, part of the composite valley of the river Vardar. Immediately entering the Greater Skopje area, it receives several small streams from the left, from the Skopska Crna Gora mountain. It passes next to the ruins of the ancient city of Scupi, but has no major settlements on its Macedonian course, before it reaches the northern suburbs of Skopje, Bardovci and Novo Selo, and empties into the Vardar at the Skopje's northern borough of Ǵorče Petrov at an altitude of 262 m (860 ft).

== Characteristics ==
The Lepenac belongs to the Aegean Sea drainage basin, with its own drainage area of 770 km^{2} (297 sq mi) (695 km^{2} or 268 sq mi in Kosovo, 75 km^{2} or 29 sq mi in Macedonia). It is not navigable.

The Kaçanik gorge is a route for both the road and the railway Kraljevo-Pristina-Skopje.

The river has a potential for hydroelectrical production, but even though being a part of the former Ibar-Lepenac Hydrosystem project, it is not much used, either for energy production or irrigation.

The Lepenac was a part of the artificial bifurcation, as the Nerodime connected both Lepenac and Sitnica rivers via a canal, thus connecting Aegean and Black Sea drainage basins, but the canal was covered after World War II.
