= Žar Mountain =

Mountain in Kosovo

- Zhar Mountain
- Location within Kosovo

Highest point
- Elevation: 1,511 m (4,957 ft)
- Coordinates: 42°16′14″N 20°57′57″E

Naming
- Native name: Жар-планина / Žar-planina (Serbian); Mali Zhar (Albanian)

Geography
- Country: Kosovo

Žar Mountain (Serbian: Жар-планина / Žar-planina) or Zhar Mountain (Albanian: Mali Zhar) is a mountain of Kosovo. It has an elevation of 1,511 metres (4,957 feet) above sea level.

The mountain marks the watershed of the drainage basins of the Ibar within the Danube drainage basin, the White Drin, and the Vardar. Hence the water from the mountain flows to the Black Sea, the Adriatic Sea and the Aegean Sea, respectively.
