= Vehicle registration plates of Kosovo =

Republic of Kosovo
- An illustration of a Republic of Kosovo (RKS) plate released since 2010
- Country: Kosovo
- Country code: RKS

Current series
- Size: 520 mm × 110 mm 20.5 in × 4.3 in
- Serial format: 01 234-AB (01 being the regional code)
- Colour (front): Black on white
- Colour (rear): Black on white

Vehicle registration plates of Kosovo are issued by the Ministry of Internal Affairs of the Republic of Kosovo. As of June 1, 2012, all residents of Kosovo are obliged to fit their cars with RKS plates. Non-compliance results in confiscation of the non-Kosovar plates (including Serbian plates with district codes for claimed Kosovar districts) and legal charges.

== Numbering and lettering ==
On 6 December 2010, a new design was introduced containing the letters RKS (Republic of Kosovo) on a blue field, a two digit number corresponding to the districts of Kosovo, the coat of arms of Kosovo, a three-digit number and finally two serial letters. The three-digit number starts at 101 and the serial letters start at AA.

Code	Districts
01	Pristina
02	Mitrovica
03	Peja
04	Prizren
05	Ferizaj
06	Gjilan
07	Gjakova

== Plates of vehicles, trailers and motorcycles ==
Horizontal plates of vehicles should be white retro – reflecting coloured, numbers and letters black coloured, while the frame should be black coloured with 4 mm width. In all horizontal plates, in the first horizontal part of the plate that is blue coloured, is placed the code of the Republic of Kosovo, RKS, with gold colour. In the second part of the plate are marked figures of the respective region.

Diagram of Kosovo number plate, descriptions below

Further, there should be the state emblem, three digit numbers, and then the horizontal line. In the end of the plate are marked two letters of the standard Latin alphabet from A to the letter Q. Three digit numbers for ordinary, horizontal and quadrate plates of registration of the vehicles will be initiated from number 101.

== Special plates ==
- Export vehicle plates have blue background and white font.
- Police vehicles have red font.
- Kosovo Security Force has dark green background and yellow font, letters "FSK", a three-digit number and then a two-digit number.
- EULEX diplomatic plates had black and white background. Black plates had the prefix "EU" and suffix "PV", while the white plates had the prefix "EU" and suffix "LEX".
- OSCE plates are black and white, with the prefix "OSCE".
- NATO Force plates have blue background, white font and prefix "KFOR".
- UNMIK plates have "UNMIK" in top on the plate, followed by numbers.
- Old-timer car plates, contain the word "HISTORIK" and the symbol of the Goddess on the Throne.
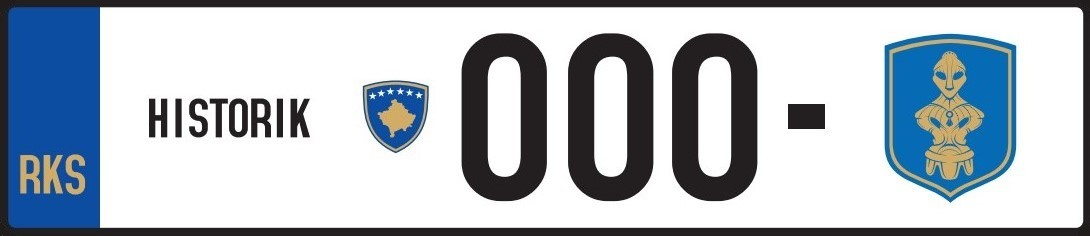
  Old-timer license plate

== North Kosovo Crisis ==
In July 2022 the implementation of rules that would make Serbian-issued plates invalid, requiring them to be switched for Kosovan-issued ones, led to protests and an ongoing conflict in Serbian majority regions of northern Kosovo. Consultation with the US and EU delayed the decision for one month from the 1st of August.

== UNMIK-era KS plates ==
These plates were issued under the administration of UNMIK from 1999 to 2010. Effective 1 November 2011, they will resume to be issued for citizens needing to cross into Serbia, as the latter only accepts these plates and not the new RKS plates. They consist of a three-digit number and a two-letter abbreviation KS, which stands for 'Kosovo', and ended in another three-digit number. These plates were no longer issued officially in 2020.

== Gallery ==
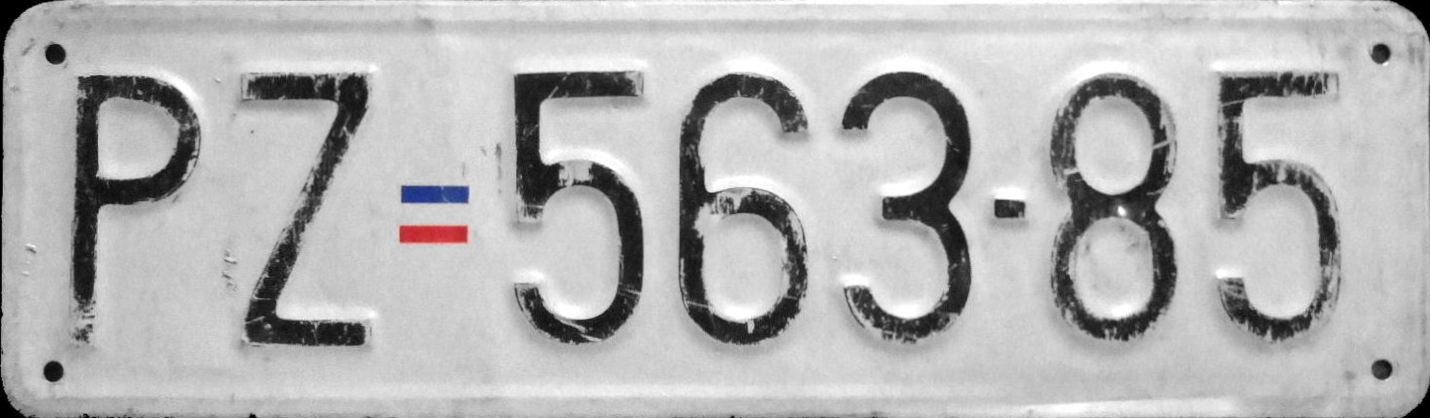
Example of a Yugoslav-era format license plate from Prizren, issued between 1998 and 30 September 1999, with a Yugoslav flag separator offset.

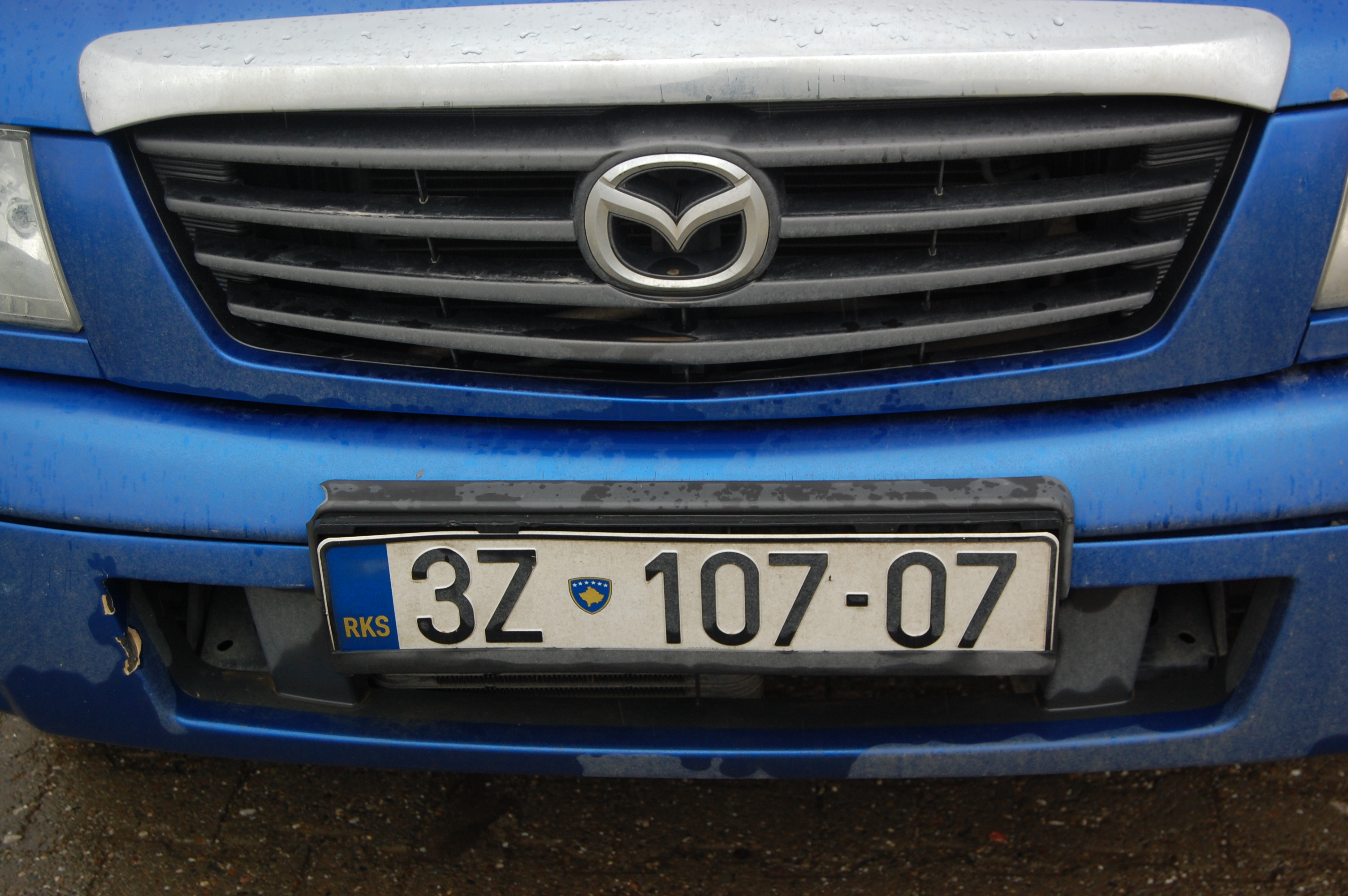
Front plate of a car from a central government authority

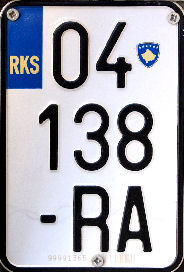
Format for mopeds and scooters ≤ 125 cm^{3}

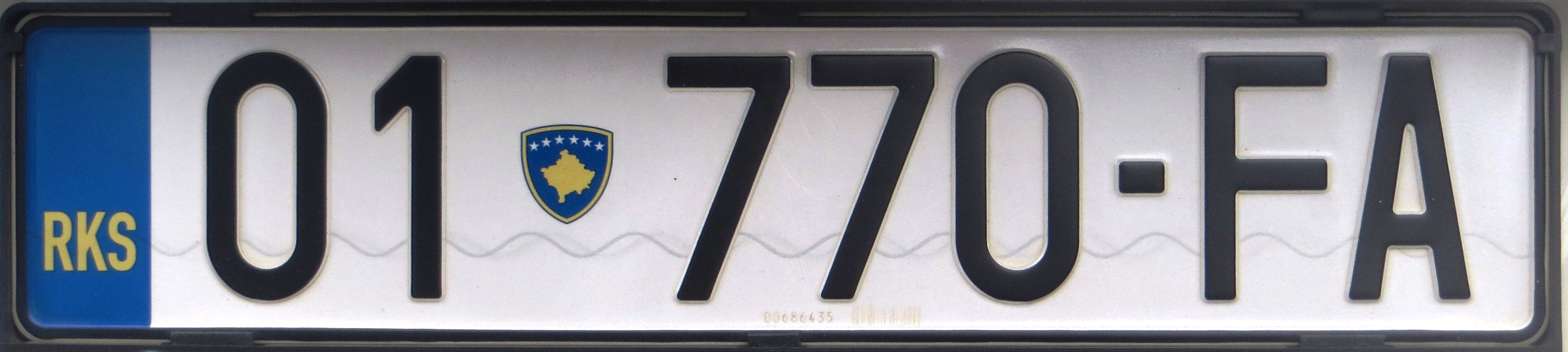
Standard passenger car plate

Customs plate

Kosovo Security Force plates

Kosova Protection Corps plates used in the 2000s, now defunct.

Emergency service plates

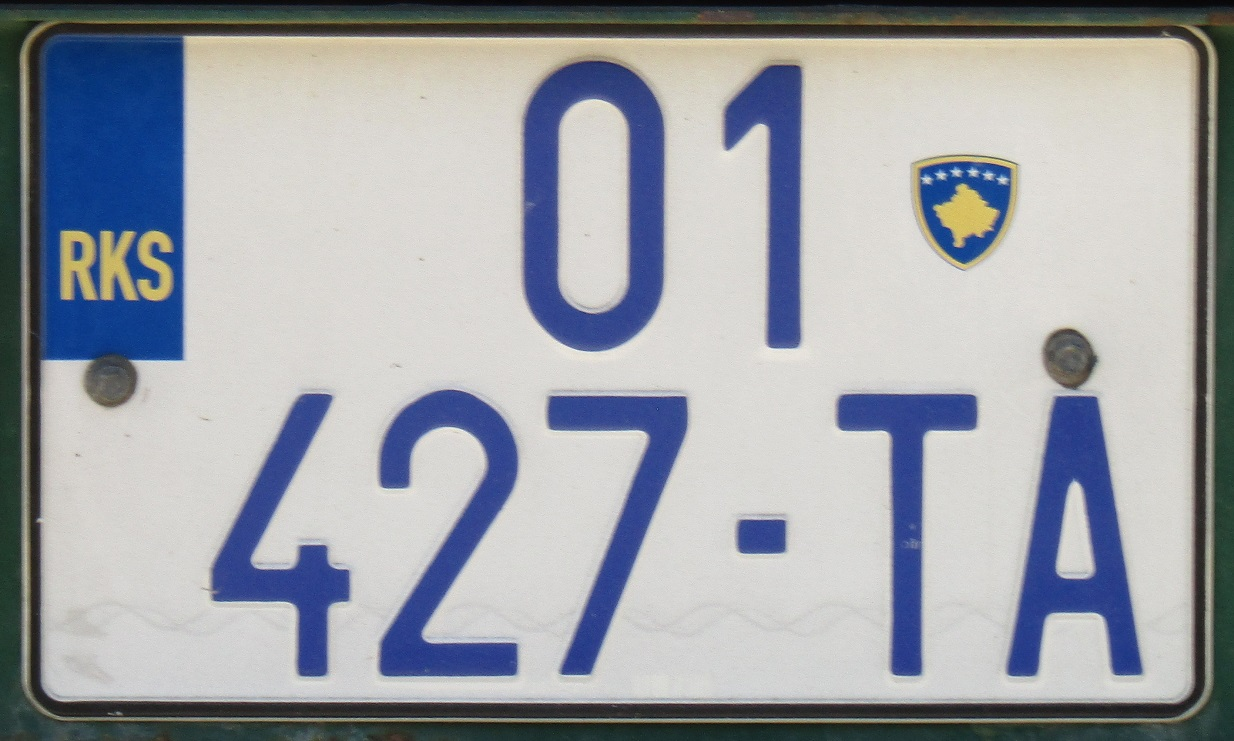
Format for trailers

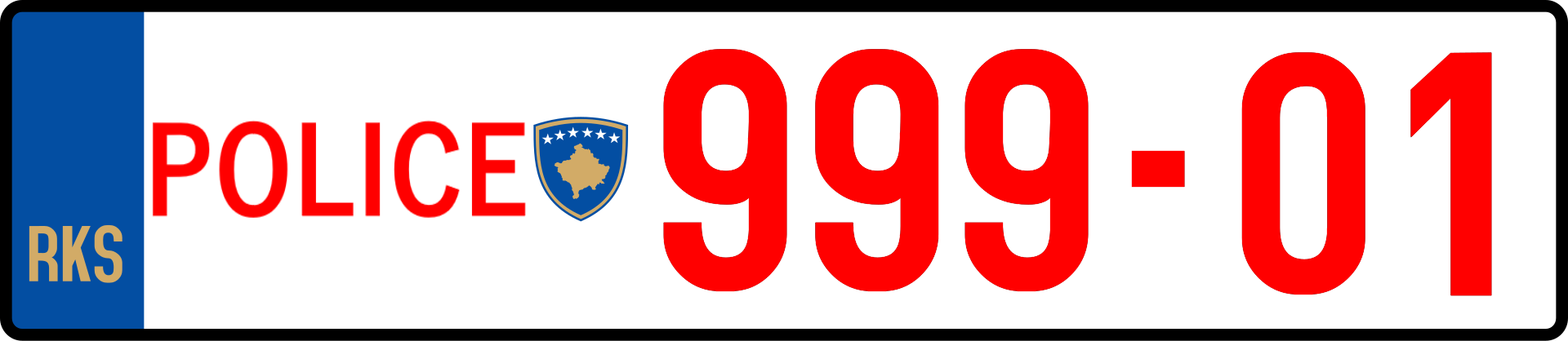
License plate of the Kosovo Police

License plate of a Kosovo Security Force vehicle of the style used until 2013 (national emblem on the left)

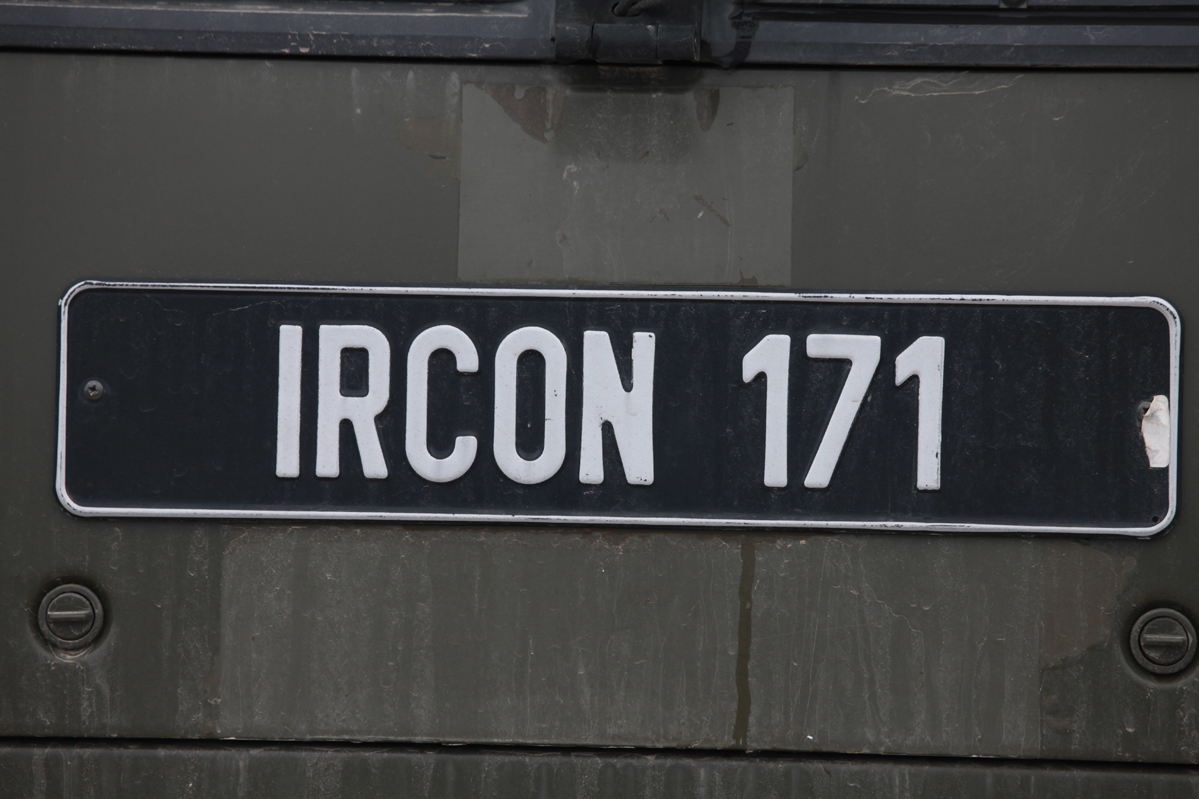
Vehicle license plate of the Irish KFOR contingent

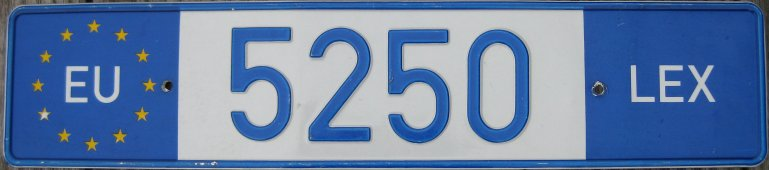
Format (the type with a white background) for EULEX vehicles

Agriculture plates

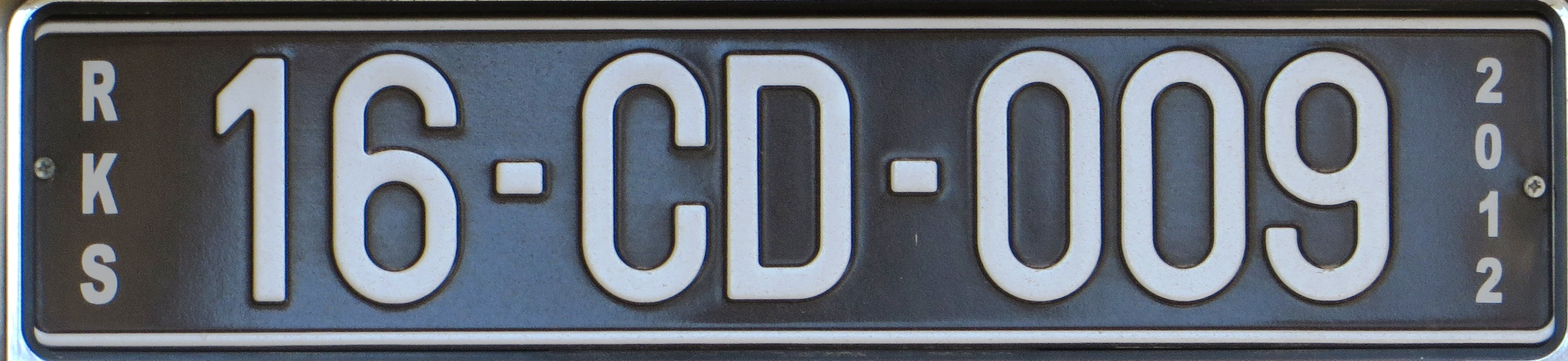
CD plate

UNMIK license plate of a Customs Guard motor vehicle

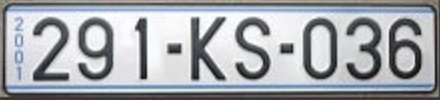
A plate issued in 2001 by the UNMIK

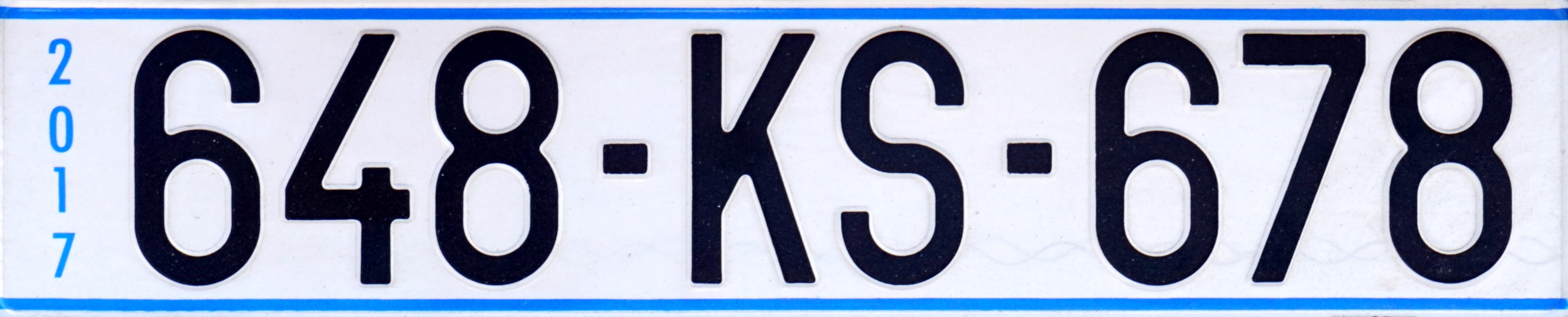
A plate issued in 2017 resembling those issued by the UNMIK in 2001. Even though new plates have been introduced, this plate was preferred to be used when crossing to Serbia. Bearers of RKS plates were issued with temporary Serbian plates instead.
