= Župa =

Historic administrative entity in Europe

A župa, or zhupa, is a historical type of administrative division in Southeast Europe and Central Europe, that originated in medieval South Slavic culture, commonly translated as "county" or "parish". It was mentioned for the first time in the eighth century and was initially used by the South and West Slavs, denoting various territorial units of which the leader was the župan.

In modern Serbo-Croatian, the term župa also refers to an ecclesiastical parish, in Slovene likewise for župnija, while the related županija is used in Croatia for lower administrative subdivisions, and likewise by Croats from Bosnia and Herzegovina (as a synonym for kanton).

== Etymology ==
The word župa or zhupa (Slovak and Czech: župa; Polish: żupa; Serbo-Croatian and Bulgarian: жупа; adopted into Hungarian: ispán and rendered in Greek as ζουπανία (zoupania, "land ruled by a župan")), is derived from Slavic. Its medieval Latin equivalent was comitatus. It is mostly translated into "county" or "district". According to Kmietowicz, it seems that the territorial organization had been created in Polish territories before the Slav Migrations. Some Slavic nations changed its name into "opole", "okolina", "kraj" and "vierw", but it has survived in župan. Some scholars consider the word's older meaning was "open area in the valley". This interpretation is confirmed by the Bulgarian župa ("tomb"), Polish żupa and Ukrainian župa ("salt mine"), and Old Slavonic župište ("tomb"). As such, the Proto-Slavic *župa wouldn't derive from *gʰeu-p- (with *gʰeu- meaning "bend, distort"), yet from Indo-European *g(ʰ)eup-/*gʰeub- meaning "cavity, pit", which derives from Nostratic *gopa meaning "hollow, empty". However, Aleksander Brückner suggested the opposite evolution; župa as a back formation from title župan (for the etymology see corresponding article), which is a borrowing from Iranian languages (*fsu-pāna, "shepherd").

== Usage ==
The division had a widespread distribution and did not always had a concrete institutional definition. The term župa was at first the territorial and administrative unit of a tribe but was later only an administrative unit without tribal features. The South Slavs that settled in Roman lands to a certain degree adopted Roman state organization, but retained their own tribal organization. Slavic tribes were divided into fraternities, each including a certain number of families. The territory inhabited by a tribe was a župa, and its leader was the župan.

The zhupa (plural zhupi) was an administrative unit in the First Bulgarian Empire, a subdivision of a larger unit called comitatus. In these countries, the equivalent of "county" is "judet" (from Latin judicium). The Croats and the Slovaks used the terms županija and župa for the counties in the Kingdom of Croatia and Kingdom of Hungary. German language translation of the word for those counties was komitat (from Latin comitatus, "countship") during the Middle Ages, but later it was gespanschaft (picking up the span root that previously came from župan).

=== Bosnia ===
Territorial-political organization in medieval Bosnia was intricate, and composed on several levels. In this scheme in the territorial-political organizational order of the medieval Bosnian state, župa was basic unit of the state organization, with feudal estate at the bottom, followed by village municipality, both below župa, and zemlja above it, with the state monarch at the top. During the 15th century, disappearance of the old organization based on župas is observed. It is obvious that at some point the Bosnian largest landowning barons no longer needed them in its old organizational capacity.

=== Croatia ===
Croatian counties in the 10th century

The Croatian word župa signifies both a secular unit (county) and a religious unit (parish), ruled over by a "župan" (count) and "župnik" (parish priest).

Croatian medieval state was divided into eleven ζουπανίας (zoupanias; župas), and the ban ruled over additional three župas Krbava, Lika, and Gacka).

Today the term županija is the name for the Croatian regional government, the counties of Croatia. Mayors of counties hold the title of župan (pl. župani), which is usually translated as "county prefect". In the 19th century, the counties of the Kingdom of Croatia-Slavonia were called županija. The Croats preserved the term župa until the modern times as the name for local clerical units, parishes of the Catholic Church and of the Protestant churches. The parish priest is called župnik.

=== Hungary ===
In c. 1074, the župa is mentioned in Hungary as -spán, also as határispánságok (march, frontier county). The derivative titles were ispán, nominated by the king for not defined time, and gradually replaced by főispán in the 18-19th century; megyésispán, also nominated by the king but could be expelled anytime; alispán was the leader of the jurisdiction in the county if the 'megyésispán' was not available; várispán was more linked to the "vár" (fortress) in Hungary in the times of Árpád.

=== Serbia ===
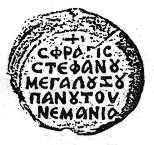
Seal of Serbian Grand Prince Stefan Nemanja (r. 1166-1196), with Greek inscription containing the title megalou zoupanou (veliki župan)

The Serbs in the Early Middle Ages were organized into župe, a collection of neighboring village communities within a geographically distinctive region (roughly the equivalent of a county), headed by a local župan (a magistrate or governor). Thus the title of grand župan (veliki župan), meant "supreme župan" of župans who ruled over župas, particularly in the Grand Principality of Serbia, from the end of the 11th up to the beginning of the 13th century.

Dušan's Code (1349) named the administrative hierarchy as following: "land(s), city(ies), župa(s) and krajište(s)", the župa(s) and krajište(s) were one and the same, with the župa on the border were called krajište (frontier). The župa consisted of villages, and their status, rights and obligations were regulated in the constitution. The ruling nobility possessed hereditary allodial estates, which were worked by dependent sebri, the equivalent of Greek paroikoi; peasants owing labour services, formally bound by decree.

Though the territorial unit today is unused, there are a number of traditional župe in Kosovo, around Prizren: Sredačka Župa, Sirinićka Župa, Gora, Opolje and Prizrenski Podgor. The Serbian language maintains the word in toponyms, the best known being that of the Župa Aleksandrovačka.

=== Slovakia ===
The term župa was popularized in Slovak professional literature in the 19th century as a synonym to contemporary Slovak term stolica (county). After the collapse of the Austro-Hungarian Monarchy, it was used as the official name of administrative units of Slovakia within Czechoslovakia in 1919 – 1928 and then again in the Slovak Republic during WWII in 1940–1945. Nowadays, the term is used semi-officially as a short alternative name for the self-governing regions of Slovakia. The president of the self-governing region is semi-officially called župan.

=== Slovenia ===
In Slovenia, the mayor of a municipality has the title župan. The name also survived in the clerical context, as parishes are called župnija (dual: župniji, plural: župnije). Colloquial parishes are also called "fara" (dual: fari, plural: fare). A parish priest is called župnik (dual: župnika, plural: župniki).

== See also ==
- Grand Župan, a Serbian medieval title (equivalent to Grand Prince)
- Gespan
- Ban
- Gau
- Shire

== Sources ==
- Acta Universitatis Carolinae: Geographica, Volume 38, Issue 1. Universita Karlova. 2005. p. 146.
- Alemany, Agustí (2009). "From Central Asia to the Balkans: the title *ču(b)-pān". In Allison, Christine; Joisten-Pruschke, Anke; Wendtland, Antje (eds.). From Daēnā to Dîn: Religion, Kultur und Sprache in der iranischen Welt. Wiesbaden: Harrassowitz Verlag. pp. 3–12. ISBN 978-344705917-6.
- Anđelić, Pavao (1982). Studije o teritorijalnopolitičkoj organizaciji srednjovjekovne Bosne [Studies on the territorial political organization of medieval Bosnia] (in Serbo-Croatian). Sarajevo: Svjetlost, OOUR Izdavačka djelatnost. pp. 9–24.
- Biliarsky, Ivan (2011). Word and Power in Mediaeval Bulgaria. Brill. p. 368. ISBN 978-900419145-7.
- Brückner, Alexander (1908). "Über Etymologische Anarchie". Indogermanische Forschungen. 23: 206–219. doi:10.1515/if-1909-0118. S2CID 202507000.
- Brugmann, Karl (1900). "Aksl. župa 'Bezirk'". Indogermanische Forschungen. 11: 111–112. doi:10.1515/9783110242539.111. S2CID 170500221.
- Ćirković, Sima (2004). The Serbs. Malden: Blackwell Publishing. ISBN 978-1-4051-4291-5.
- Erdal, Marcel (1988). "The Turkic Nagy-Szent-Miklós inscription in Greek letters". Acta Orientalia Academiae Scientiarum Hungaricae. 42: 221–234.
- Evans, Arthur (2007). Through Bosnia and the Herzegovina on Foot During the Insurrection, August and September 1875. Cosimo. ISBN 978-1-60206-270-2.
- Fine, John Van Antwerp Jr. (1991) [1983]. The Early Medieval Balkans: A Critical Survey from the Sixth to the Late Twelfth Century. Ann Arbor: University of Michigan Press. ISBN 0-472-08149-7.
- Fine, John Van Antwerp Jr. (1994) [1987]. The Late Medieval Balkans: A Critical Survey from the Late Twelfth Century to the Ottoman Conquest. Ann Arbor: University of Michigan Press. ISBN 0-472-08260-4.
- Gluhak, Alemko (1990), Porijeklo imena Hrvat [Origin of the name Croat] (in Croatian), Zagreb, Čakovec: Alemko Gluhak
- Gluhak, Alemko (1993), Hrvatski etimološki rječnik [Croatian etymological dictionary] (in Croatian), Zagreb: August Cesarec, ISBN 953-162-000-8
- Kmietowicz, Frank A. (1976). Ancient Slavs. Worzalla Pub. Co. pp. 185, footnote.
- Piško, Michal (3 October 2009). "Slovo župa je praslovanského pôvodu, aj tak ho nechceme" [The word county is of Proto-Slavic origin, we don't want it anyway]. SME (in Slovak).
- Quintavalle, Arturo Carlo (2007). Quintavalle, Arturo Carlo (ed.). Medioevo: la chiesa e il palazzo: atti del convegno internazionale di studi, Parma, 20-24 settembre 2005 [Middle Ages: the church and the palace: proceedings of the international study conference, Parma, 20-24 September 2005] (in Italian) (Illustrated ed.). Electa. p. 140.
- Smiljanić, Franjo (2007), "O položaju i funkciji župana u hrvatskim srednjovjekovnim vrelima od 9. do 16. stoljeća" [About position and function of župan in Croatian historical sources from 9th until 16th century], Povijesni prilozi (in Croatian), 33 (33)
- Štih, Peter (1995). "Novi pokušaji rješavanja problematike Hrvata u Karantaniji" [New attempts to resolve the problems of Croats in Karantania]. In Budak, Neven (ed.). Etnogeneza Hrvata [Ethnogenesis of Croats] (in Croatian). Matica hrvatska. ISBN 953-6014-45-9.
- "Terminológia verejnej správy na Slovensku" [Terminology of public administration in Slovakia] (PDF). Komunálne výskumné a poradenské centrum [Communal Research and Advisory Center] (in Slovak).
- Tomović, G. (1999). "Župa i Župan". Leksikon srpskog srednjeg veka. Beograd. pp. 195–198.
- Vucinich, Wayne S. (1975). A study in social survival: The Katun in Bileća Rudine. Denver: University of Denver.
- The Yugoslav village. University of Zagreb Institute for Agricultural Economics and Rural Sociology. Institute for Agricultural Economics and Rural Sociology. SOUR for rural sociology. 1972. p. 39.
- Živković, Tibor (2012). De conversione Croatorum et Serborum: A Lost Source. Belgrade: The Institute of History.
