= Štrpce =

Štrpce: Shtërpca or Shtërpcë (Albanian) Štrpce or Штрпце (Serbian)
- Town and municipality
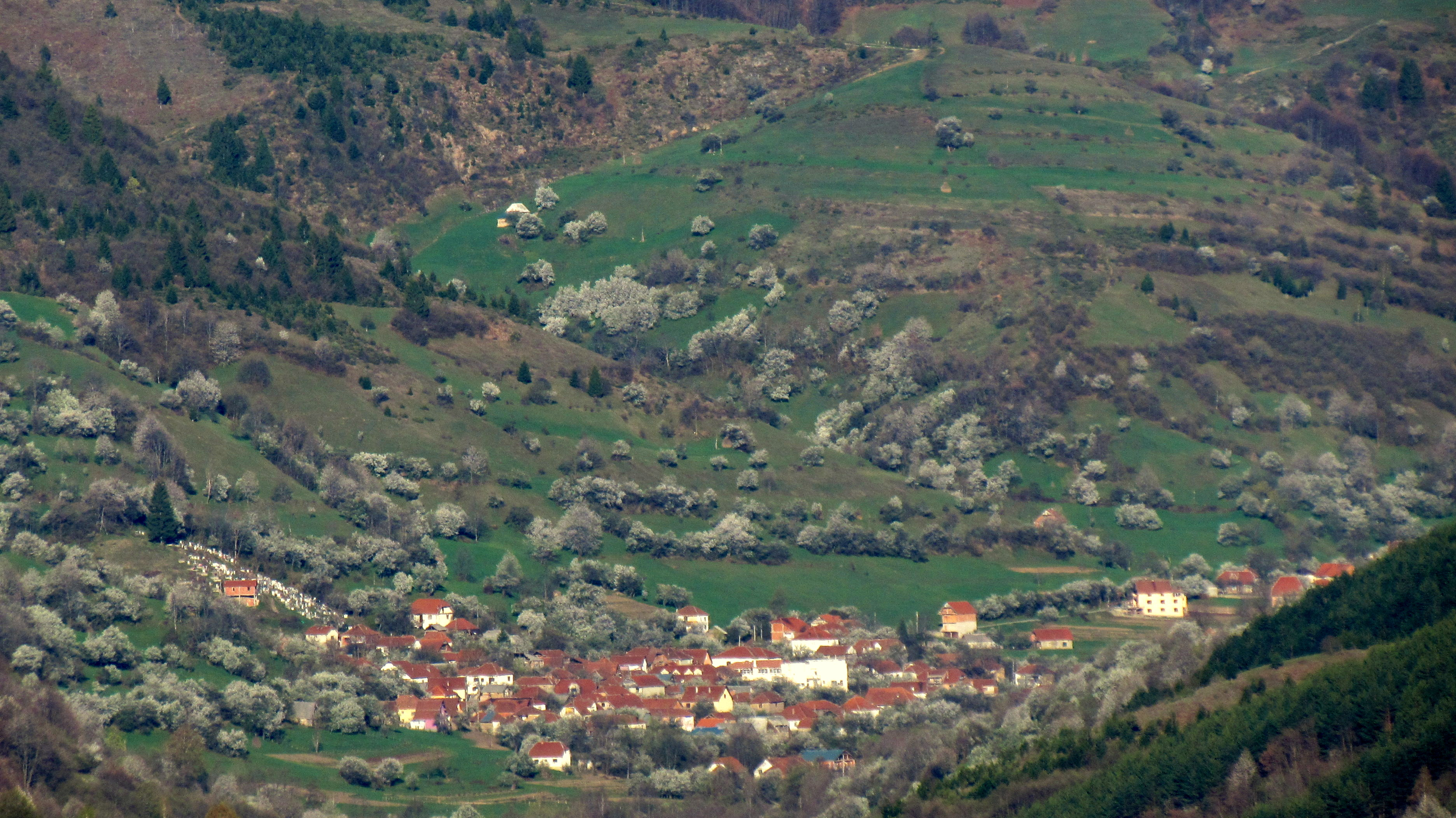
- Town of Štrpce

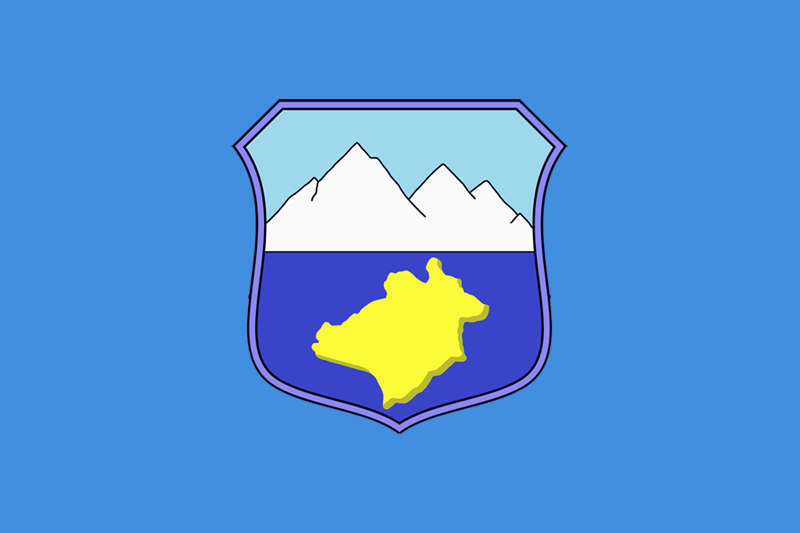
- Flag Seal
- Interactive map of Štrpce
- Location within Kosovo
- Country: Kosovo
- District: Ferizaj
- Settlements: 17

Government
  - Mayor: Ivica Tanasijević (SL)

Area
  - Municipality: 247.36 km^{2} (95.51 sq mi)
- Elevation: 975 m (3,199 ft)

Population (2024)
  - Municipality: 10,771
  - Density: 43.544/km^{2} (112.78/sq mi)
  - Urban: 2,431
  - Ethnicity: 75% Serbs; 24.4% Albanians; 0.6% Other
- Time zone: UTC+1 (CET)
  - Summer (DST): UTC+2 (CEST)
- Postal code: 73000
- Area code: +383(0)290
- Vehicle registration: 05
- Website: Official site

Štrpce (Serbian Cyrillic: Штрпце) or Shtërpcë (Albanian definite form: Shtërpca) is a town and municipality located in the Ferizaj District in Kosovo. As of 2024, it has a population of 10,771 inhabitants. The town is second largest Serbian enclave in Kosovo.

== History ==
=== Middle Ages ===
In Medieval Serbia, the župa (county, district) of Sirinić (Sirinićka župa), first mentioned in a 13th-century charter, covered the whole of modern Štrpce municipality, having the towns of Gradište (site in Brezovica) and Zidinac (site in Gotovuša). Several remains of Byzantine forts exist in the region. At the top of the Čajlije hill, above the mouth of the Piljevac creek of the Lepenac river, there exists the remains of the Gradište fort, which has two layers, the first from the 6th century, and the second from the 13th century. The fort is in ruins, of which a donjon tower, and outlines of other buildings, can be identified. The entrance to the city, at the north, was protected by a tower. From that tower, a rampart continued, with another tower, from where a defensive wall stretched to the foot of the hill, towards the Lepenac.

=== World War II ===
On 28 June 1944, during World War II, Bulgarian soldiers executed 46 locals (of whom 12 were children) on the Rakanovac site in Brezovica, after the death of one of their soldiers.

=== Modern ===
After the Brussels Agreement of 2013, representatives of Serbia and Kosovo agreed that the municipality was expected to become part of the proposed Community of Serb Municipalities.

== Demographics ==
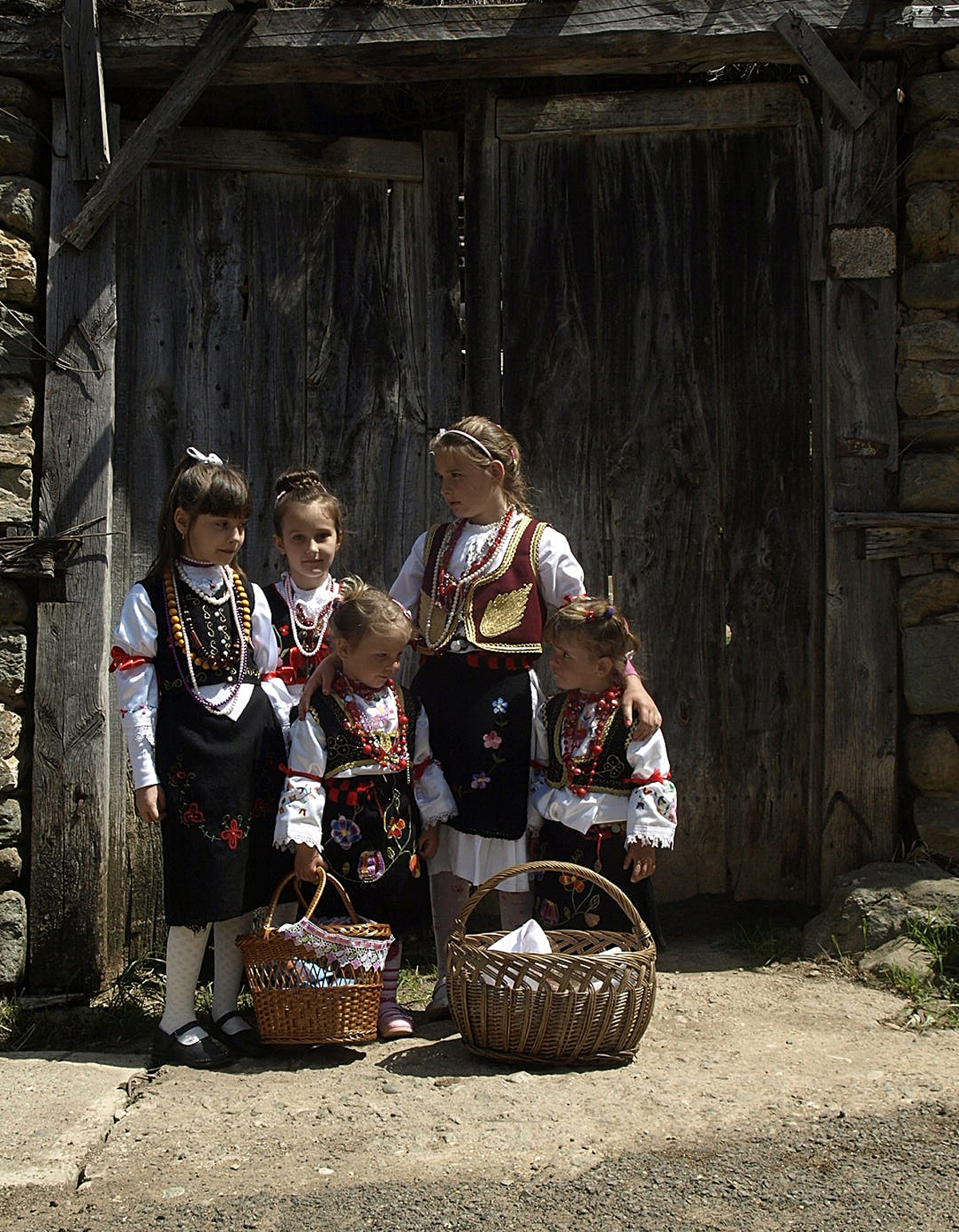
Girls in Serbian traditional costumes

Historical population
| Year | Pop. | ±% p.a. |
|---|---|---|
| 1948 | 9,573 | — |
| 1953 | 10,348 | +1.57% |
| 1961 | 10,797 | +0.53% |
| 1971 | 11,664 | +0.78% |
| 1981 | 12,115 | +0.38% |
| 1991 | 12,712 | +0.48% |
| 2011 | 6,949 (Note: The 2011 census was partly boycottedd by the Serbs) | −2.97% |
| 2024 | 10,771 | +3.43% |

According to the 2024 census by the Kosovo Agency of Statistics, the municipality of Štrpce has inhabitants 10,771 inhabitants while the town has 2,431 inhabitants. The ethnic composition of the municipality is 75% Serbs, 24.4% Albanians, and 0.6% others.

=== Ethnic groups ===
The ethnic composition of the municipality of Štrpce:

| Ethnic group | 1961 census | 1991 census | 2015 est. | 2023 est. | 2024 census |
|---|---|---|---|---|---|
| Serbs | 7,545 | 8,138 | 9,100 | 8,680 | 8,080 |
| Albanians | 3,637 | 4,300 | 4,500 | 5,120 | 2,626 |
| Romani | - | - | 30 | 38 | 37 |
| Turks | - | 74 | - | 20 | 2 |
| Others | 51 | 200 | - | - | 26 |
| Total | 11,239 | 12,712 | 13,630 | 13,858 | 10,771 |

== Geography ==
The municipality of Štrpce located in southeastern Kosovo and it covers an area of 247.36 km^{2} (95.51 sq mi). It is located in a mountainous region in the north-eastern side of the Sharr Mountains, also known as the valley of Sirinc which is the upper surface of the Lepenac river basin.

== Tourism ==
=== Brezovica ski center ===
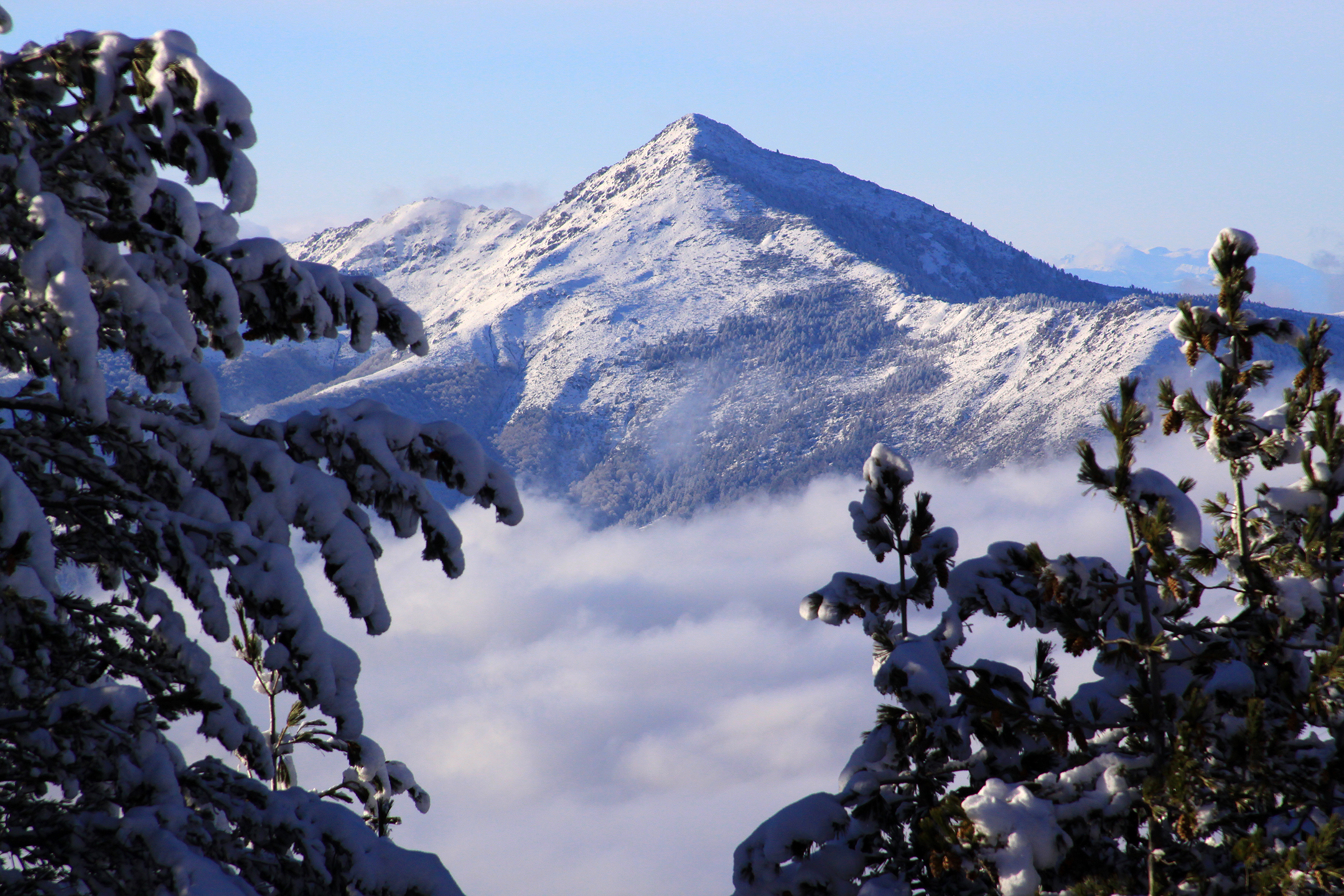
Photograph of Brezovica

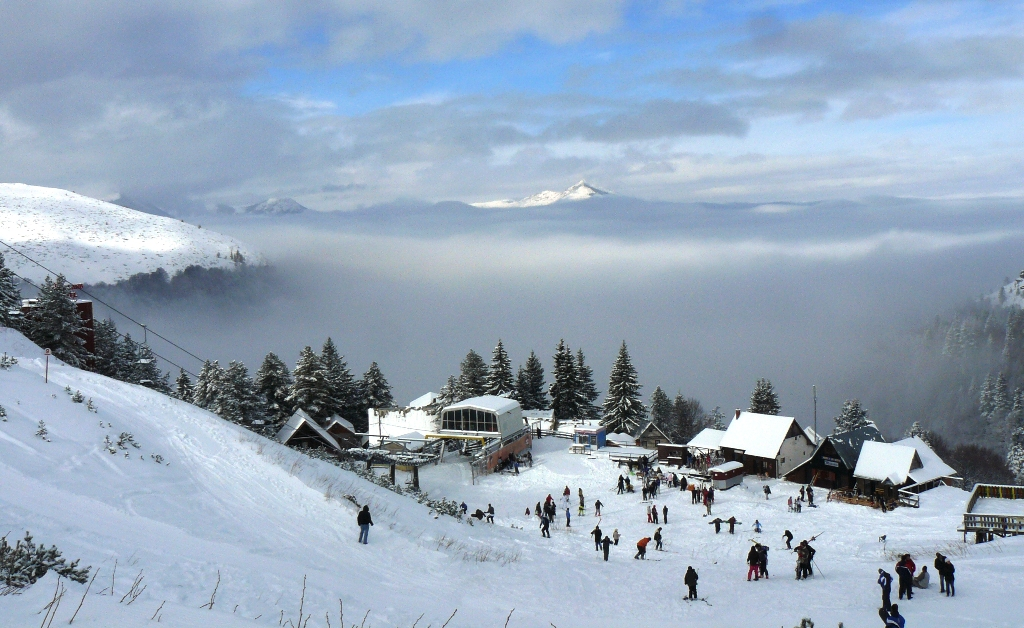
Photo of Brezovica

The Brezovica ski center is a popular center which lies in the north-western side of the Šar Mountains. Its distance from Prishtina Airport is 60 km. With its alpine nature and high mountainous environment, Brezovica and its surroundings remind you of most European and worldwide renowned touristic centers. Brezovica's surroundings cover different natural characteristics as the valley of Lepenac, its ridges reaching the height of 900m to 2.600 m. The lower zone of the tourism complex reaches a height of 900 to 980 m above the sea level and is wide slope covering the Lepenc.

=== Šar Mountain National Park ===
Šar Mountain National Park was established in 1986, covering a surface of 39.000 hectares.

=== Natural lakes ===
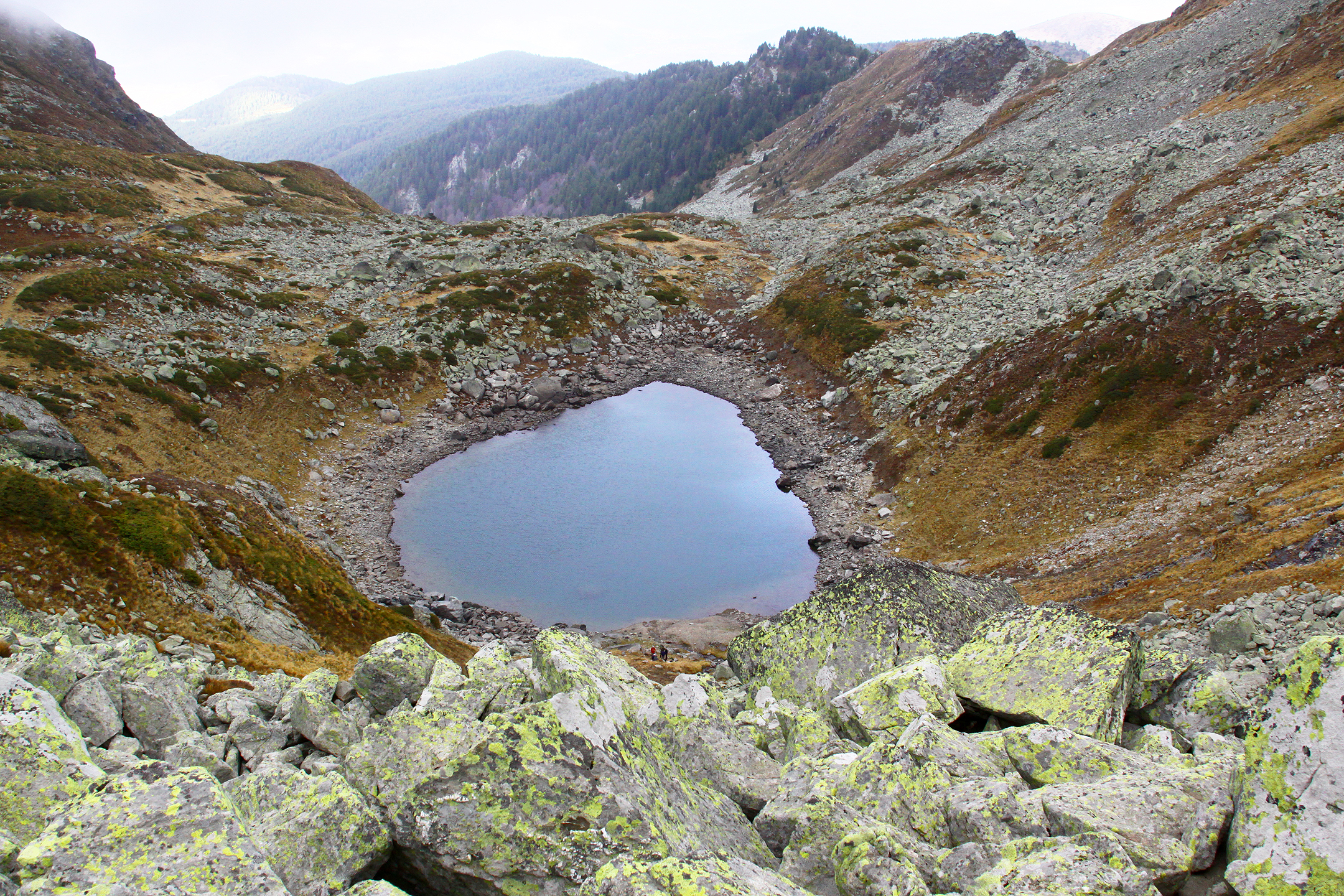
Jezersko lake

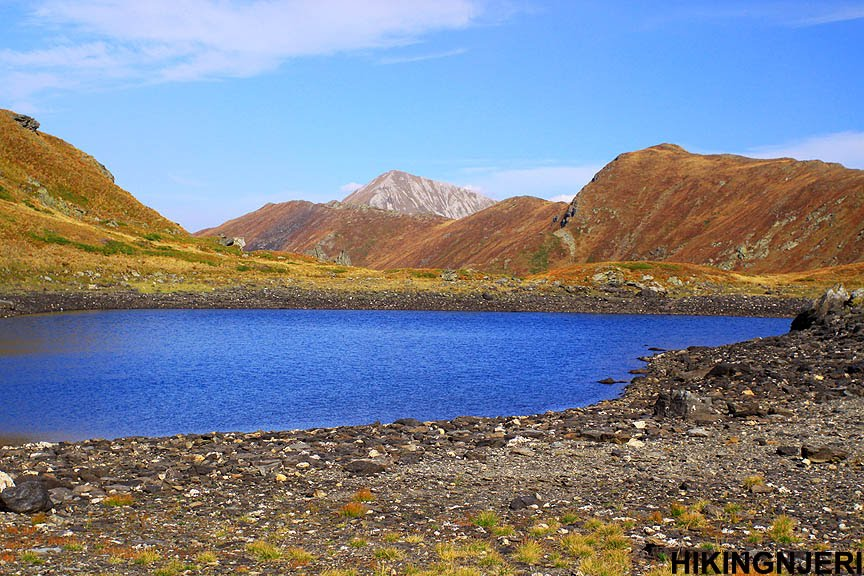
Natural lake of Brezovica

Traditionally they belong to the Štrpce municipality formed as a result of Iceberg erosions. The people of Štrpce know them as "mountains eyes" thanks to their beauty. Depending on the weather conditions, these lakes are covered with snow from November to May. It consists of lakes: Livadičko lake, Mountain Vir lake, small Jezersko lake etc. The inhabitants of Štrpce still call it Štrebačko lake. It covers wide plains and deep circle land the peak of Livadica 2491 m reaching the height of 2.173 and its width of 220–124 m.

=== Churches ===
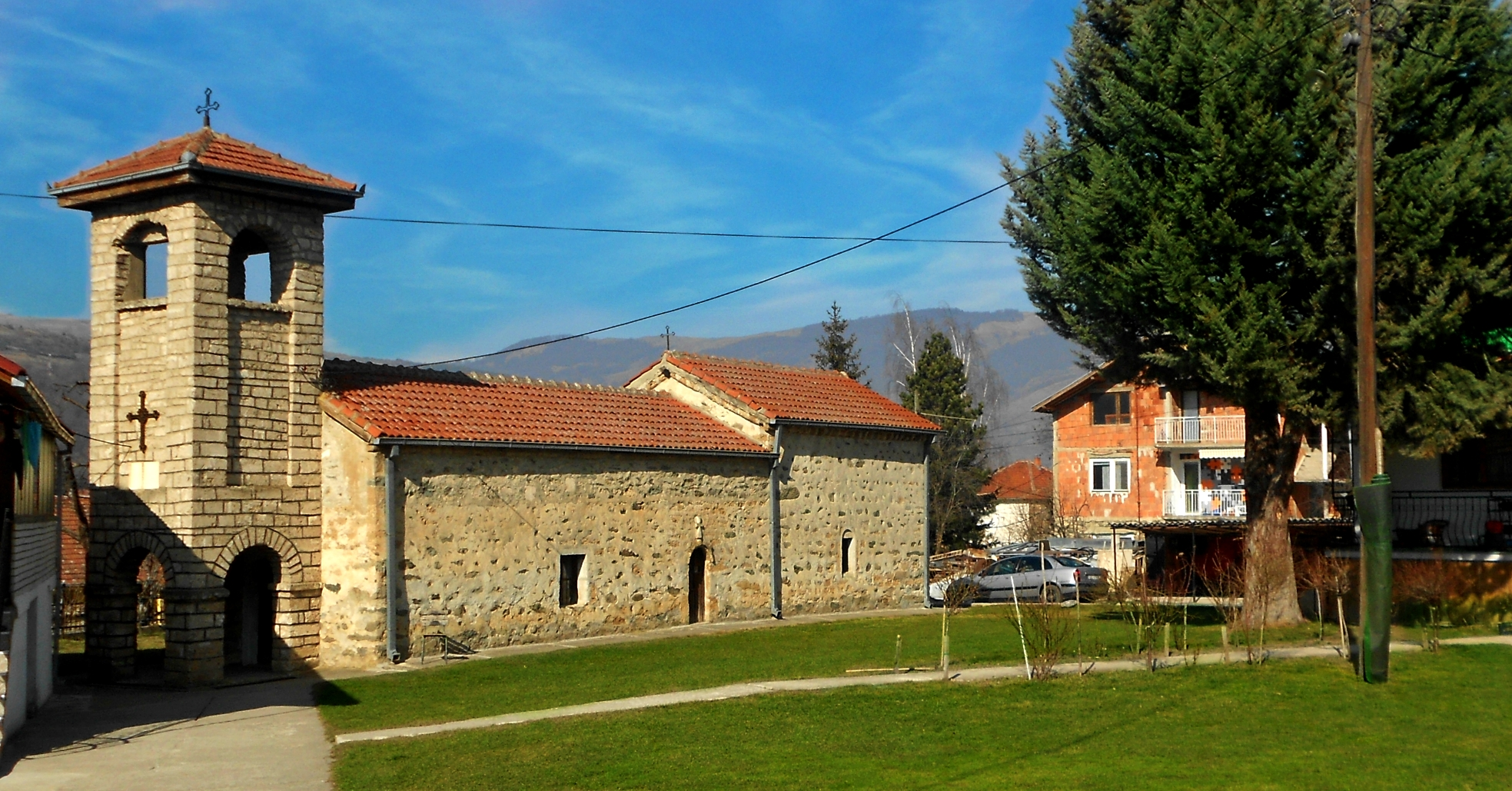
View of Sveti Nikola church in Štrpce

There are two Orthodox churches in Štrpce: St. Nikola (Sveti Nikola) and St. Jovan (Sveti Jovan). St. Nikola was built in 1576-77 by locals, and St. Jovan was built in 1911.

=== Traditions ===
One traditional holiday that is celebrated in Štrpce is Bele Poklade, also called Procka.

== Public services and infrastructure ==
=== Administration ===
The town of Štrpce is the seat of the municipality government. It also has a hospital and ambulances.

=== Education ===
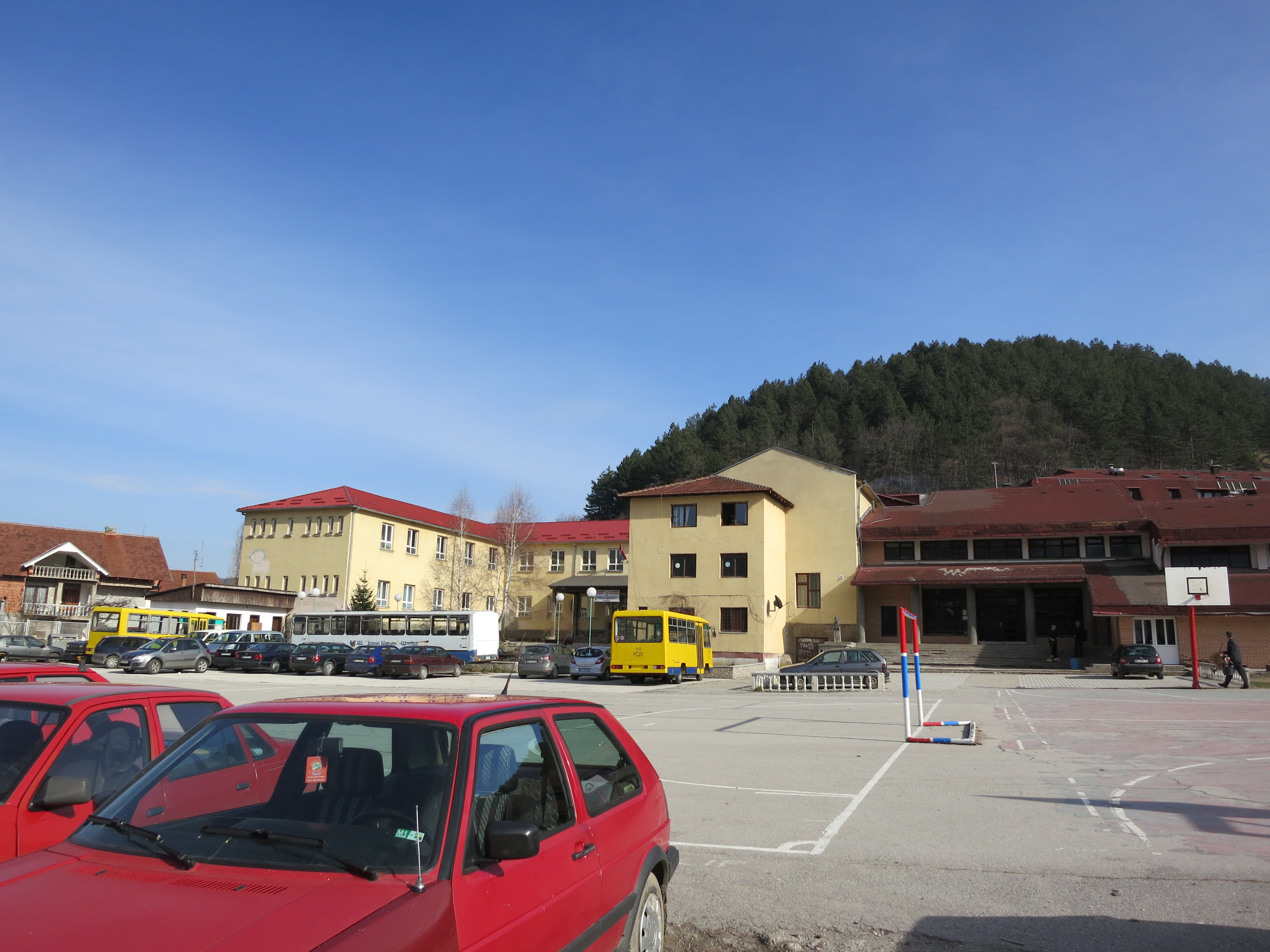
Štrpce schools

There are primary and high schools in Štrpce. The high school is named for Jovan Cvijic. The high school has many courses of study including medicine, economy, law, gymnasium (general studies), and tourism. The primary school is named after Staja Marković, a 20th-century guerrilla fighter.

There is also a kindergarten in Štrpce that is named Fawn of the Shara.

== Notable people ==
- Dardan Çerkini, Kosovan footballer
- Iljaz Halimi, Albanian politician
- Bahri Hyseni, Kosovan politician
- Svetomir Arsić Basara, Serbian sculptor and writer
- Tomislav Milovanović, Serbian singer

== See also ==
- Municipalities of Kosovo
- Cities and towns in Kosovo
- Populated places in Kosovo
