= List of monuments in Vushtrri =

This is an incomplete list of monuments in Vushtrri municipality:

== Cultural monuments ==
Number	Name	Description	Location	Photo
1	Old Hamam (Vushtrri)	The Old Hamam of Vushtrri (also known as the Gazi Ali Bey Hamam) is one of the oldest and most prominent monuments in Vushtrri, Kosovo.	20°57′51.5″N 42°49′18.0″E	Old Hamam (Vushtrri)
2	Former Historical Archive (Vushtrri)	The Former Historical Archive (Vushtrri) is a cultural heritage monument in Vushtrri municipality, Kosovo. The building is two-story and was built of brick on a stone foundation.	42°49′21″N 20°57′53″E	Former Historical Archive (Vushtrri)
3	Kalaja e Vushtrrisë (Vojinović Tower)	The Old Tower in Vushtrri (Kalaja e Vushtrrisë - Vojinovic Tower) is a city fortifications in Vushtrri, Kosovo.	42°49′20″N 20°58′3″E	The Old Tower in Vushtrri
4	Ura e Gurit, Vushtrri (Vojinovic Bridge)	The Stone Bridge in Vushtrri (Serbian: Војиновића мост/Vojinovića most; Albanian: Ura Nëntë Harkore) is located in Vushtrri, Kosovo.	42°49′25″N 20°57′37″E	The Stone Bridge in Vushtrri
5	Mahmut Gjinolli House	The Mahmut Gjinolli House is a cultural heritage monument in Vushtrri Municipality, Kosovo.		Mahmut Gjinolli House
6	Kadri Hyseni Tower House	The Kadri Hyseni Tower House is a cultural heritage monument in Oshlan, Vushtrri, Kosovo.		Kadri Hyseni Tower House
7	Zeynullah Bey Tower House	The Zeynullah Bey Tower House is a cultural heritage monument in Balince, Vushtrri, Kosovo.		Zeynullah Bey Tower House
8	Hajrizi Mill (Gentleman's Mill)	The Hajrizi Mill or Gentleman's Mill is a cultural heritage monument in the village of Smrekonica, Vushtrri Municipality, Kosovo		Hajrizi Mill
9	Gentleman's Wall (Smrekonica)	The Gentleman's Will is a cultural heritage monument in Smrekonica, Vushtrri, Kosovo.		Gentleman's Wall (Smrekonica)
10	Zymer Musiqi House	The Zymer Musiqi House is a cultural heritage monument located in the village Cecelia, Vushtrri. The house was built of stone and wood with a straw-based mortar. The ground floor includes soft limestone and wood with walls about 1 metre (3.3 ft) thick, while the first floor uses the aforementioned thatch mortar albeit less on the north side. The roof is tile and stretches out into a 1-m awning. There are two entrances, one northward and one southward, with an interior staircase connecting both to the three bedrooms, living room, hearth, hallway, and bathrooms inside. The south side featured a divan for summer gatherings.		Zymer Musiqi House
11	Tower of Azem and Shote Galica	The Tower of Azem and Shote Galica (Albanian: Kulla e Azem dhe Shotë Galicës) is a cultural heritage monument located in Galica, Vushtrri Municipality, in Kosovo.		Tower of Azem and Shote Galica

== Religious monuments ==
Number	Name	Description	Location	Photo
1	Church of St John the Baptist, Samodreža	The Church of St John the Baptist (Serbian: Црква Светог Јована Претече, romanized: Crkva Svetog Jovana Preteče) also known as the Church of St. Lazar (Serbian: Црква Св. Лазара, Crkva Sv. Lazara, Albanian: Kisha e Shën Llazarit) in Samodreža, six kilometers east of Vushtrri, Kosovo, is a Serbian Orthodox Church dedicated to the Beheading of St John the Baptist.		Church of St. John Baptist, Samadrexhë
2	Church of Saint Elijah, Vučitrn	Church of Saint Elijah is a Serbian Orthodox Church located in Vushtrri, the city and the seat of the eponymous municipality in Kosovo. The church dedicated to St. Elijah was built in 1834 on the foundations of the old Orthodox church in the eastern part of Vushtrri, where the buried church items were found.		Kisha e Vushtrrisë
3	City Tekke (Vushtrri)	The City Tekke of Vushtrri is a tomb and a cultural heritage monument in Vushtrri, Kosovo. It is named a teqe or tekke because the local Sufi monastery or khanqah, so named in the region, is nearby.		City Tekke (Vushtrri)
4	Gazi Ali Beg Mosque	Mosque of Gazi Ali Bey (Xhamia e Gazi Ali Beut) was built in 1444 near the public bath (Hammam). During the last war in 1999, its [minaret] was destroyed by a Serbian grenade. In 2002 the mosque was restored and the minaret was rebuilt, unfortunately not corresponding to the original one. Besides this, authenticity of the mosque and its surrounding was damaged by removal of the carrel near the entrance and some grave-stones from the yard. It is a protected monument by law with a status number 02-985/66. This mosque is one of the oldest ones in Kosovo. Destroyed during the war, this mosque was rebuilt.		Mosque of Gazi Ali Beg

== Archaeological & architectural sites ==
Number	Name	Description	Location	Photo
1	Pestova (archaeological site)	Pestova village is located in the municipality of Vushtrri, on the left side, stretched along the Pristina-Kosovska Mitrovica road, more or less 4 km from Vushtrri. The area is known for a very fertile agricultural land, productive even in present days.		Villa Rustica (Pestova)
2	Duboc Fortress	Duboc Fortress is situated above the Ceçan, part of the Ciçavica mountain chain, in the village of Duboc, approximately 10–12 km in the south-west of the Municipality of Vushtrri.		Duboc Fortress
3	Stroc Castle	The Stroc Castle is a cultural heritage monument in Stroc, Vushtrri, Kosovo.		Stroc Castle
4	Maletaj architectural complex	Maletaj or Gumnishta is situated 18 kilometers in the north-east side of the Municipality of Vushtrri. In this village is found a Dardani location named Katunishte. The substructure of this location is situated in a valley that has the form of the letter T. It has three entrances and it is all enclosed. The main entrance is called "The doors of Katunishta" (Albanian: "Dyert e Katunishtes"). Next to this location is situated "The Hill of Church" where is the groundwork of the church. None of this locations has not been studied yet. In this village was found an altar of the Antiquity period, with inscription that has not been deciphered yet because it is very damaged. Mycrotoponyms in Maletaj: The Crown Mountain, The Goddess Creek, Venc Hill, Creek above Torishta, Fountain of Mata, Fountain of Nika etc.		Maletaj architectural complex

== Natural monuments ==
Number	Name	Description	Location	Photo
1	Bukoshi Oak	The Bukoshi Oak is a natural heritage monument of botanical character, located in the village of Bukosh in Vushtrri Municipality, Kosovo.		Bukoshi Oak
2				

== See also ==
- List of monuments in Prizren
- Archaeological sites in the District of Mitrovica
