= Kadri Hyseni Tower House =

- Kulla e Kadri Hysenit (Albanian)
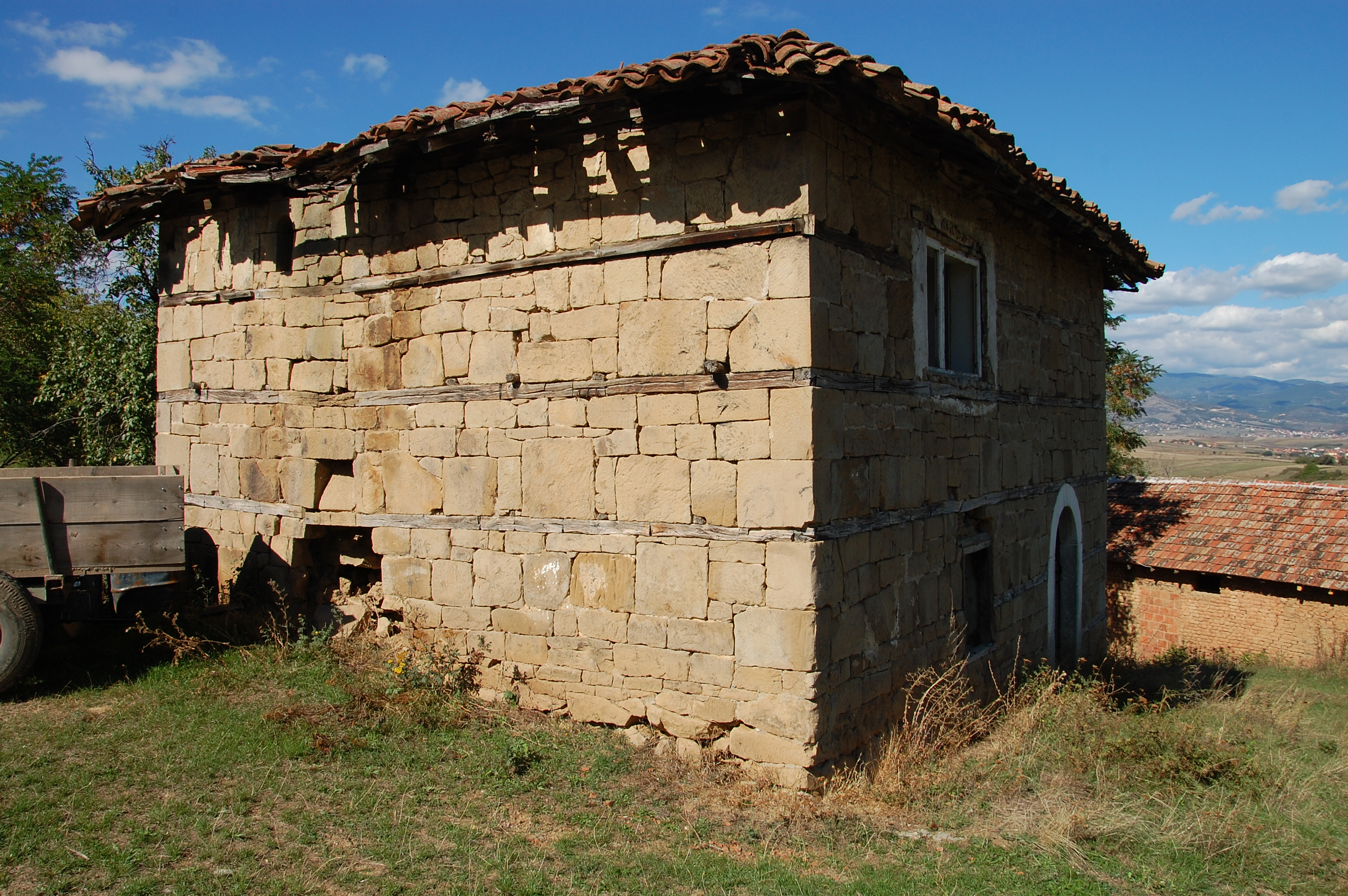
- Location: Oshlan, Vushtrri, Kosovo

History
- Built: 19th century

The Kadri Hyseni Tower House is a cultural heritage monument in Oshlan, Vushtrri, Kosovo.

== History ==
Oshlan has been settled since the 15th century, appearing in the 1455 defter of the Branković lands, an Ottoman Empire land registry. Though many tower houses in the Balkans were burned during the conflicts in which the Kingdom of Yugoslavia grew, Kadri Hyseni Tower House remains a solid example. A carved stone tower in a wide, walled courtyard, it stretches to two stories. Open square windows have gun turrets on all four sides. The roof is tiled. The tower's wooden roofed door and stone wall and well contrast to the tower and its immediate vicinity. The site's historic importance includes its use by guerrilla Kachaks fighting the Yugoslav government under Azem Galica. Emergency restoration was conducted in 2014 by the Kosovo Ministry of Culture, Youth, and Sport.

== See also ==
- Sanjak of Viçitrina
- List of monuments in Vushtrri
