= City Tekke (Vushtrri) =

Tomb in Vushtrri, Kosovo

City Tekke and Shrine
- Teqja e Qytetit Tyrbe (Albanian)
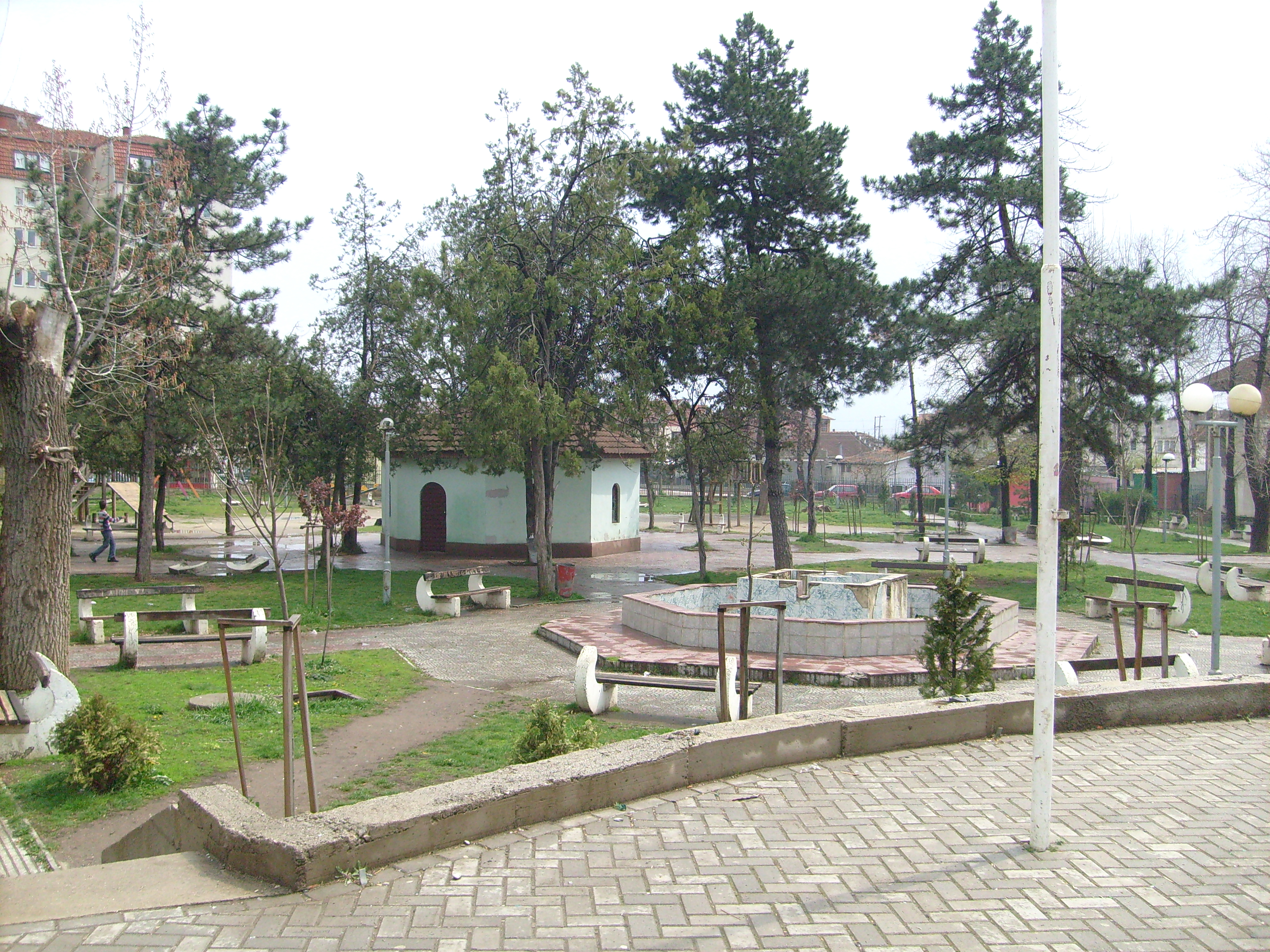
- Interactive map of City Tekke and Shrine
- 42.821111°N 20.971269°E
- Location: Vushtrri, Kosovo

History
- Built: 19th century

The City Tekke of Vushtrri is a tomb and a cultural heritage monument in Vushtrri, Kosovo. It is named a teqe or tekke because the local Sufi monastery or khanqah, so named in the region, is nearby.

== History ==
The tomb lies at the center of the city park, near the schools. The octagonal crypt contains six graves, said to belong to Sufi sheikhs but also speculated to be those of high-ranking Ottoman soldiers. Some of the local nobility are buried here. A shrine cult has emerged around the tomb, where candles are lit and thin metal sleeves thrown in. Those seeking luck or holding vigil will often be found there.

The graves once stretched all the way to the sports fields, but the gravestones were flattened into the current park by the Socialist Federal Republic of Yugoslavia government after World War II. This fate also befell the graves on the western side of the Old Fortress near the Vojinović Tower. The oral recounting of shrine custodian Ajet Havarda holds that the tekke was built 200 years ago.

== See also ==
- Vushtrri
- Sanjak of Viçitrina
- List of monuments in Vushtrri
