= Bukoš =

Bukoš (Serbian Cyrillic: Букош) may refer to:

- Bukoš, Vučitrn, a village in the municipality of Vučitrn
- Bukoš, Suva Reka, a village in the municipality of Suva Reka

== See also ==
- Bukosh (disambiguation)
