= Gentleman's Wall (Smrekonica) =

Cultural heritage monument of Kosovo

- Muri i Zotnisë (Albanian)
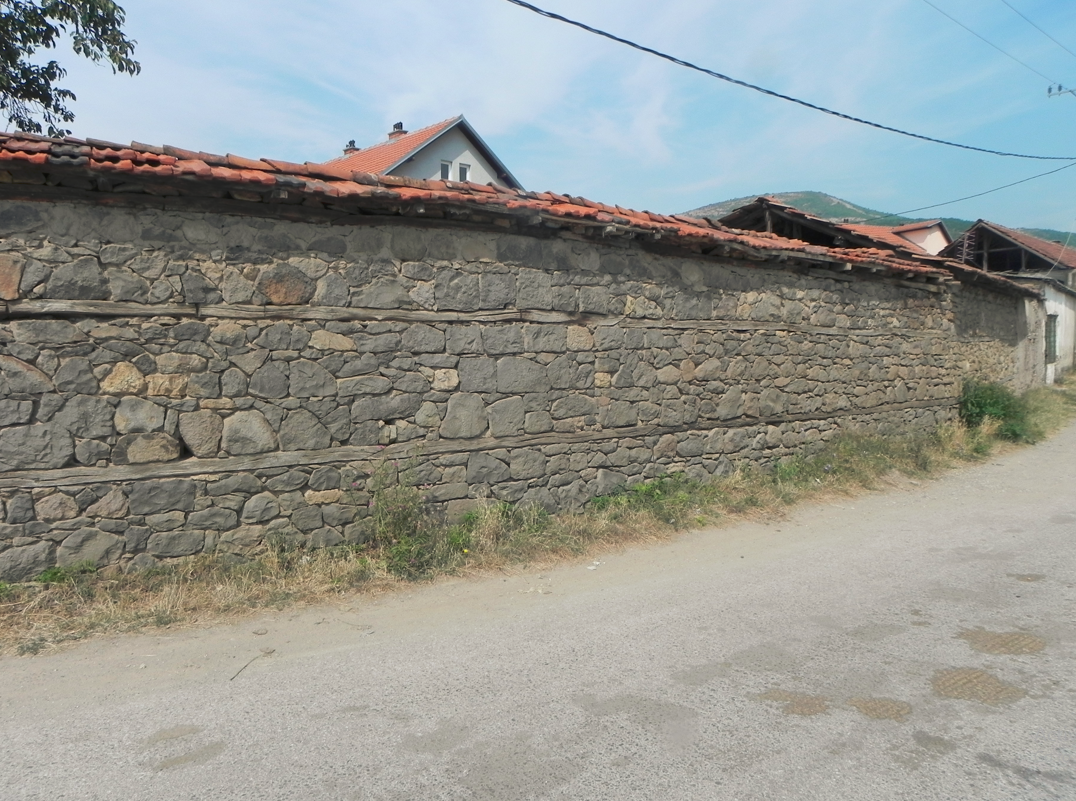
- Interactive map of Gentleman's Wall
- 42.86674°N 20.94153°E
- Location: Smrekonica, Vushtrri, Kosovo

History
- Built: 19th century

The Gentleman's Will is a cultural heritage monument in Smrekonica, Vushtrri, Kosovo.

== History ==
The wall known locally as Gentleman's Wall is located in the Kajtazi neighborhood of Smrekonica, about 7 kilometres (4.3 mi) from the center of Vučitrn. The wall is said to have been built by the local feudal lord in the 19th century. Made of carved stone, the protective wall reaches a height of 4 metres (13 ft) and is topped with a two-layer wood-braced roof covered with local tile. The village school and the lord's tower house originally stood nearby but have been lost. In the early 20th century, the Kajtazi family bought the property. The wall has never collapsed or been breached save for a section of 10 metres (33 ft) to 15 metres (49 ft) intentionally leveled for the family construction. Exterior stabilization by the family is the only renovation made so far.

== See also ==
- Sanjak of Viçitrina
- List of monuments in Vushtrri
