= Bukosh =

Bukosh (Albanian: Bukoshi) may refer to:

- Bukosh, Vushtrri, a village in the municipality of Vushtrri
- Bukosh, Suhareka, a village in the municipality of Suhareka

== See also ==
- Bukoš (disambiguation)
