= Zymer Musiqi House =

Cultural heritage monument of Kosovo

- Shtëpia e Zymer Musiqit (Albanian)
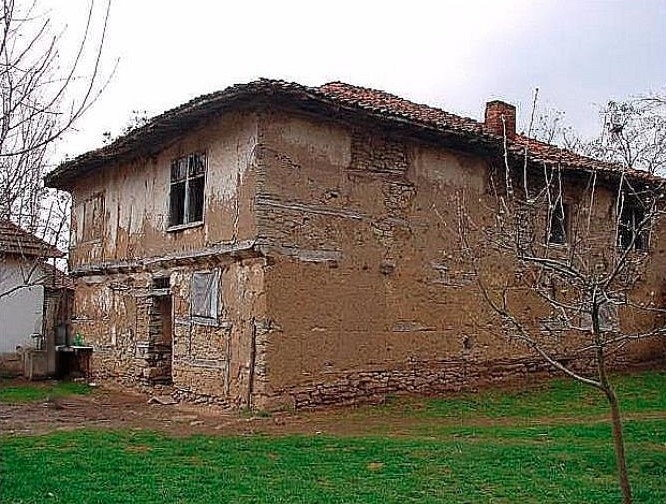
- Location: Cecelija, Vushtrri, Kosovo

History
- Built: 17th century

The Zymer Musiqi House is a cultural heritage monument in Cecelija, Vushtrri, Kosovo.

== History ==
The house, which was once the property of the Musiqi and Mulaku families, is located in a village named after Saint Cecilia, registered within the Sanjak of Vushtrri as Çeçelije in the 1537 defter of the Eyalet of Rumelia. It lies on both hillsides beside a valley about 14 kilometres (8.7 mi) northeast of Vushtrri. Several beys from Vushtrri settled here, founding the Berisha that predominates in the area today. A craftsman named Dibran is held in local folklore to have built the house as one of the first of its kind and the first school in the region in the early 17th century.

The house was built of stone and wood with a straw-based mortar. The ground floor includes soft limestone and wood with walls about 1 metre (3.3 ft) thick, while the first floor uses the aforementioned thatch mortar albeit less on the north side. The roof is tile and stretches out into a 1-m awning. There are two entrances, one northward and one southward, with an interior staircase connecting both to the three bedrooms, living room, hearth, hallway, and bathrooms inside. The south side featured a divan for summer gatherings.

== See also ==
- Sanjak of Viçitrina
- List of monuments in Vushtrri
