= Hajrizi Mill =

Cultural heritage monument

Hajrizi Mill (Gentleman's Mill)
- Mulliri i Hajrizit (Mulliri i Zotnisë) (Albanian)
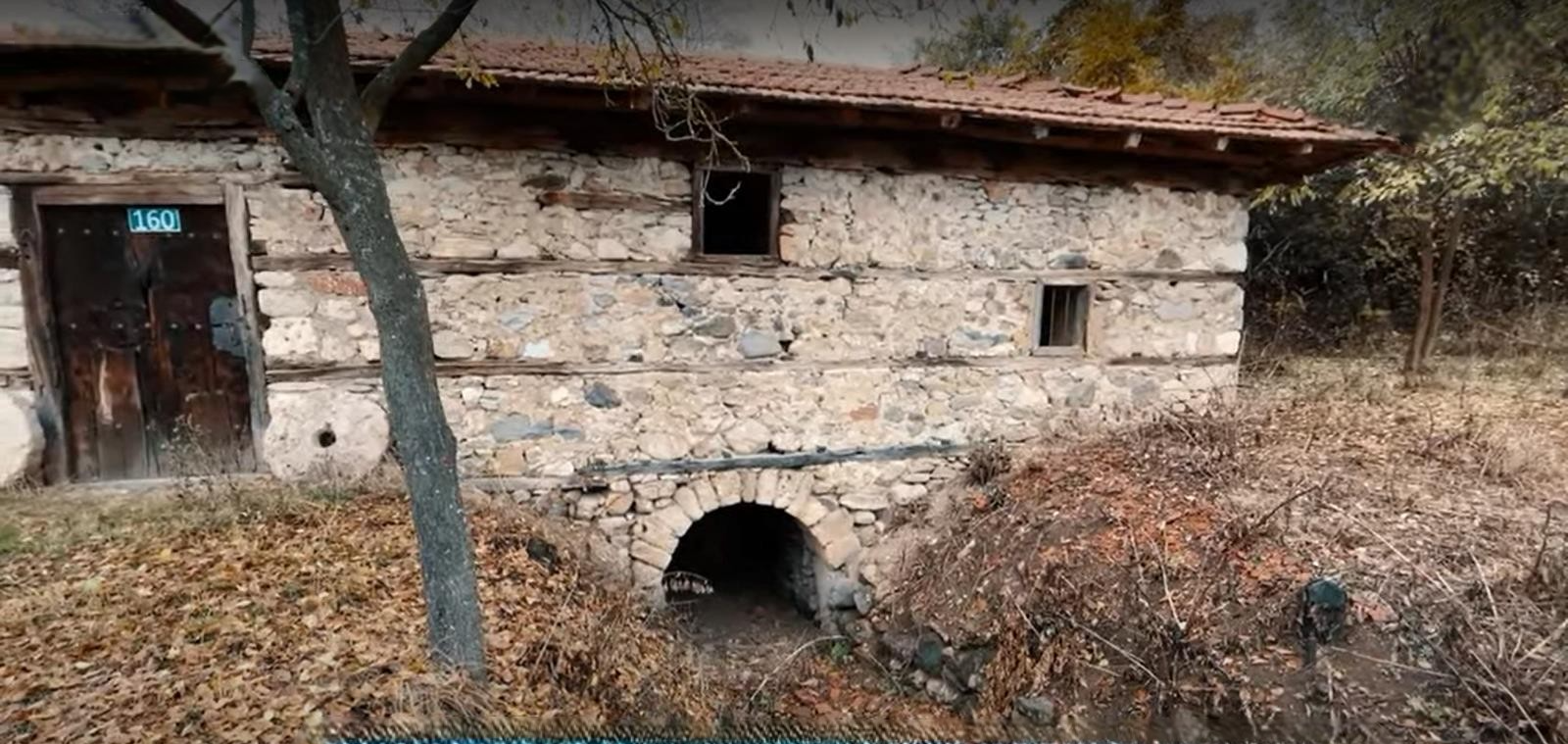
- Location: Smrekonica, Vushtrri, Kosovo

History
- Built: 19th century

The Hajrizi Mill or Gentleman's Mill is a cultural heritage monument in the village of Smrekonica, Vushtrri Municipality, Kosovo, aro.

== History ==
The watermill is in the Mustafa neighborhood of Smrekonica, in the northern part of the municipality around 7.5 kilometres (4.7 mi) from the center of Vučitrn. The mill is said to have been built by the local feudal lord in the 19th century. Originally built to grind maize and wheat, the mill is a stone structure 10 metres (33 ft)by 5 metres (16 ft) reinforced with horizontal wooden studs and a square Mediterranean tile roof. One grinding stone complete with a wooden basket was supplied for each of the two crops, which were ground simultaneously while a canal supplied abundant water. As was common in mills in the area, a miller's room housed the proprietor and guests from Smrekonica itself as well as nearby villages such as Kçi, Rashana, Pasoma, and Torllabu. The Mustafa family mill remained intact save for the millstones until after the Kosovo War. In 2002, surviving family helped renovate the roof and the first floor's interior wall.

== See also ==
- Sanjak of Viçitrina
- List of monuments in Vushtrri
