= Galica =

Village in Vushtrri Municipality, Kosovo

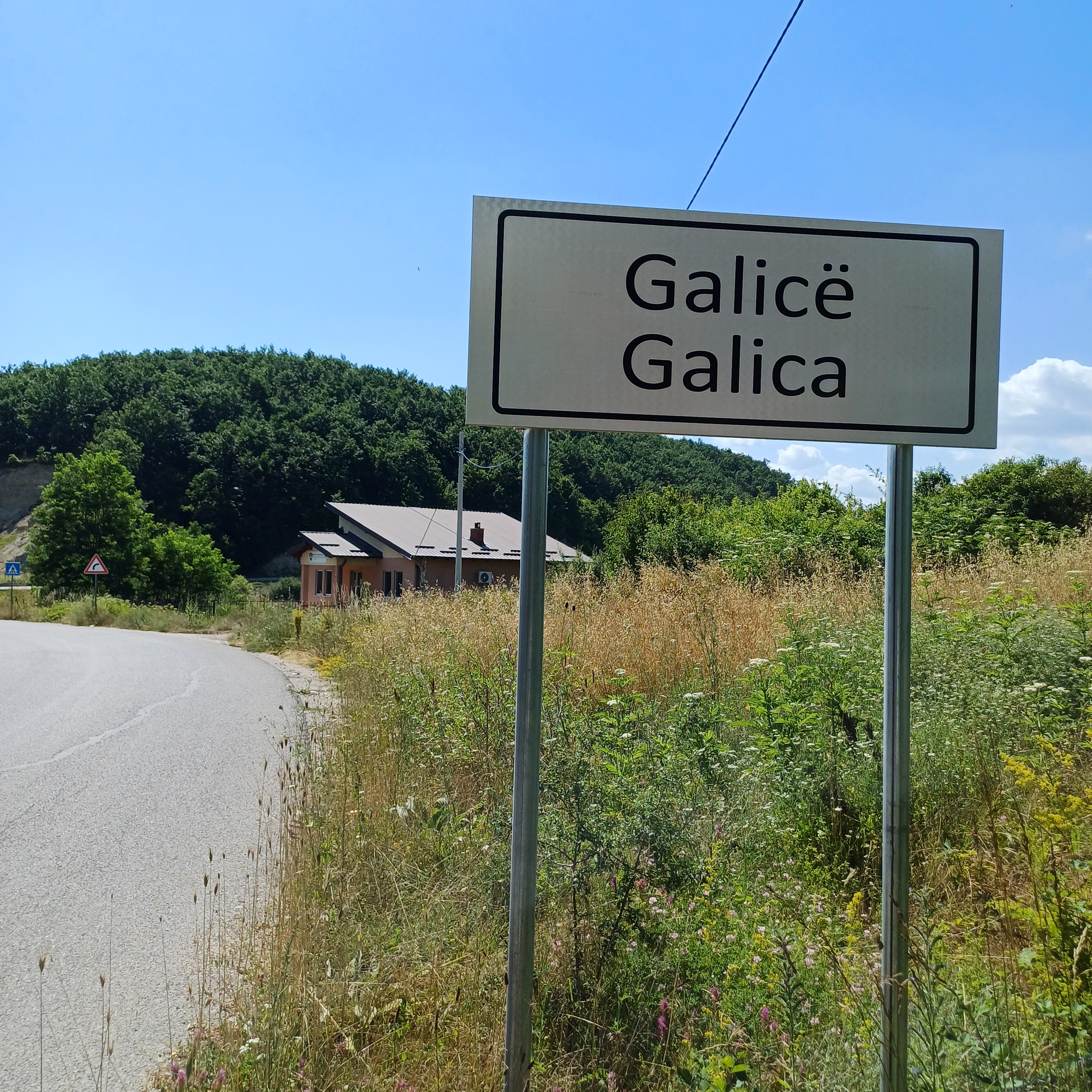
Galica

Galica is a village administratively located in the Municipality of Vushtrri, Kosovo, but geographically situated in the Drenica region. The village covers an area of 443 hectares and is known for its numerous microtoponyms such as Katuni i Moçëm, Livadhi i Kolë Bibës, Kroni i Bajramit, among others, which testify to the village's history and culture.

== Overview ==
Historical documents mention the village as early as 1455 under the name Kaliça, with a total of 50 houses. In 1725, Archbishop Pjetër Karagiqi mentioned the village Galizza with 8 houses and 50 Christian inhabitants.

Galica has a tumultuous history, especially during the 20th century. In 1908, Bejtë Galica and 25 others were killed here, and in 1920, during an action by the Serbian gendarmerie, 6 Albanian houses were burned. During the Austro-Hungarian occupation, several houses were burned, and Azem Bejta's two brothers, Seferi and Zeneli, were executed.

Azem Bejta, an important figure in the Kachak movement, strongly resisted the Serbian regime and turned Galica into part of the free zone of Drenica, known as Little Arbania. In 1924, the Serbian army attacked the villages of Galica, Mikushnicë, and Lubovec, burning 100 houses, injuring 28 and causing the deaths of 82 Albanians, most of them fighters.

Today, the Tower of Azem and Shote Galica stands in the village as an important monument of Kosovo's cultural heritage. Near this village, about 3-4 km away, lie the ruins of the ancient Duboc Fortress.

== See also ==
- Drenica
- Vushtrri
