= Zeynullah Bey Tower House =

Cultural heritage monument of Kosovo

- Kulla e Zejnullah Beut (Albanian)
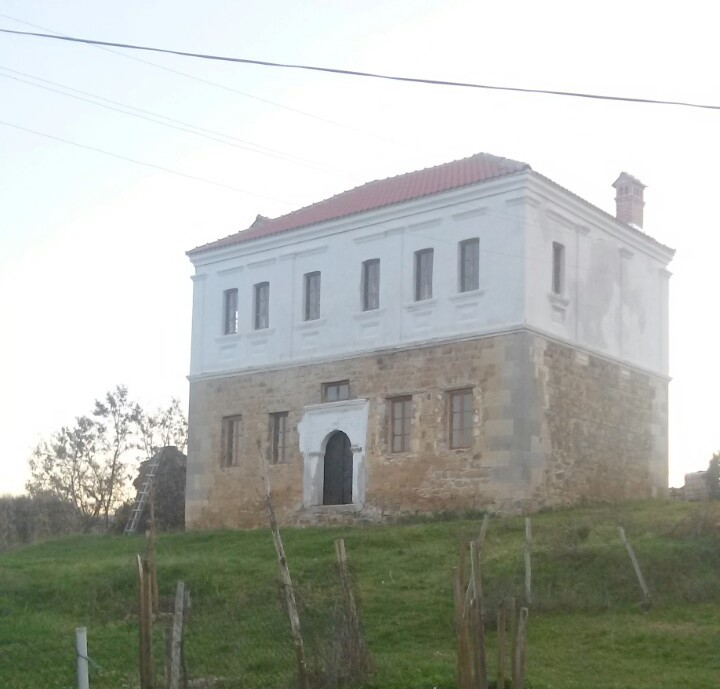

- Location within Kosovo
- 42.80969°N 20.88969°E
- Location: Balince, Vushtrri, Kosovo

History
- Built: 20th century

The Zeynullah Bey Tower House is a cultural heritage monument in Balince, Vushtrri, Kosovo.

== History ==
Built at the beginning of the 20th century as one of many properties owned by Zejnullah Bey Prishtina, grandfather of politician Hasan Prishtina, it was originally a holiday villa for family who lived elsewhere in the region. An educator by trade, Zejnullah left the building to the government as a school.

Restoration work took place in the summer of 2014. The ground floor walls were restored with similar stone and mortar to what remained, while the first floor wall had to be rebuilt from scratch with lime mortar. Roofing was restored based on photographs and what was left of the west wing. The façade was restored with its original brick and stone windows, and all surfaces were re-treated and re-plastered.

== See also ==
- Sanjak of Viçitrina
- List of monuments in Vushtrri
