= Gazi Ali Beg Mosque =

Old mosque in Vushtrri, Kosovo

- Xhamia e Gazi Ali Beut
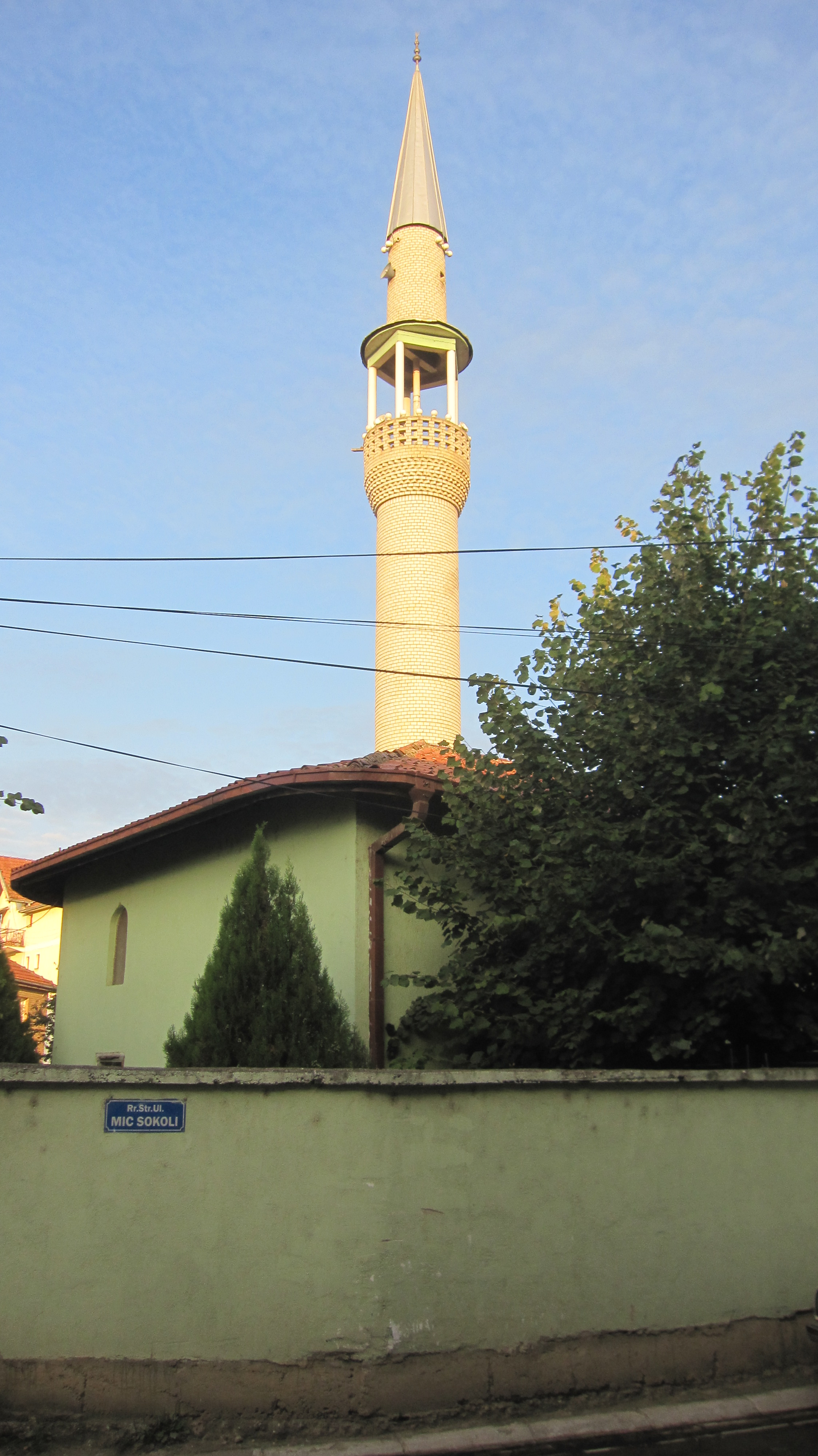

Religion
- Affiliation: Islam

Location
- Location: Vushtrri
- Country: Kosovo
- Interactive map of Gazi Ali Beg Mosque
- Coordinates: 42°49′15″N 20°57′50″E

Architecture
- Completed: 1444; 582 years ago

Gazi Ali Beg Mosque (Albanian: Xhamia e Gazi Ali Beut) is a mosque located in the old core of the city of Vushtrri, 100 m away from the Old Hammam, as part of the Gazi Ali Beg Complex. Built in the 15th century, it is one of the oldest cultural heritage monuments in Kosovo.

== History ==
Gazi Ali Beg Mosque was built in the middle of 15th century. From the beginning until today, the Mosque has always served as a sacred object for the rites and religious ceremonies of the Islamic community. Until 1999, although with some small interventions, the mosque had preserved some of the original architectural features.

== See also ==
- Islam in Kosovo
- Religion in Kosovo
- List of monuments in Vushtrri
