= Mahmut Gjinolli House =

- Shtëpia e Mahmut pashë Gjinollit (Albanian)
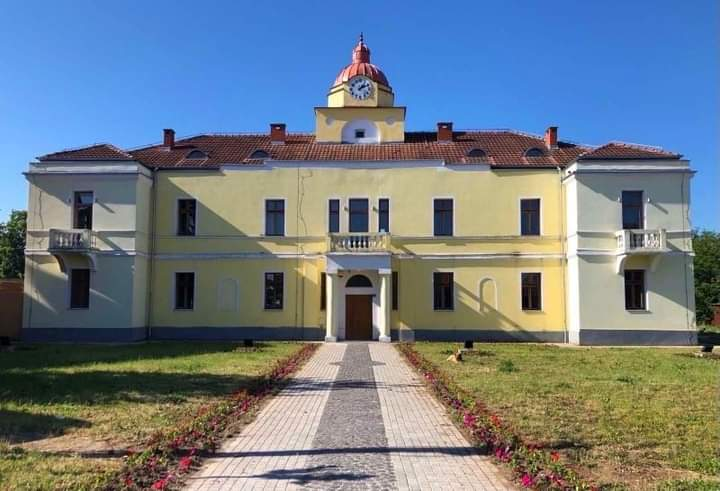
- Interactive map of Mahmut Gjinolli House
- Location: Vushtrri, Kosovo

History
- Built: 19th century

The Mahmut Gjinolli House is a cultural heritage monument in Vushtrri Municipality, Kosovo.

== History ==
The house of Mahmut Pasha Gjinolli, a member of prominent feudal lord Jashar Pasha Gjinolli’s family lies in western Vushtrri near the Terstena River. Historical records and oral tradition agree on its 19th-century origin. Later in the century, it became an Ottoman municipal office (Turkish: belediye). After World War II, it was put back into use for a similar purpose, going on to serve as an ambulance garage in the 1960s and a shelter for families displaced by floods in 1978. Including a basement and two above-ground floors, the building was built from natural stone reinforced by brick lines with some oak wood panels on the domed roof highlighted by a clock. The front façade is decorated in a Western-influenced style. The house's exterior is unchanged, and most interior changes amount to re-furnishing.

Facing eastward unlike most feudal buildings of the era, the house overlooks the city from what was at the time of construction its center to better observe the goings-on. Baroque and Ottoman elements coexist in this hybrid building. The domed clock testifies to a business-oriented mentality in the city at the time of construction.

== See also ==
- Vushtrri
- List of monuments in Vushtrri
