= Former Historical Archive (Vushtrri) =

Cultural heritage monument of Kosovo

Former Historical Archive in Vushtrri
- Ndërtesa e Arkivit të Vjetër në Vushtrri (Albanian)
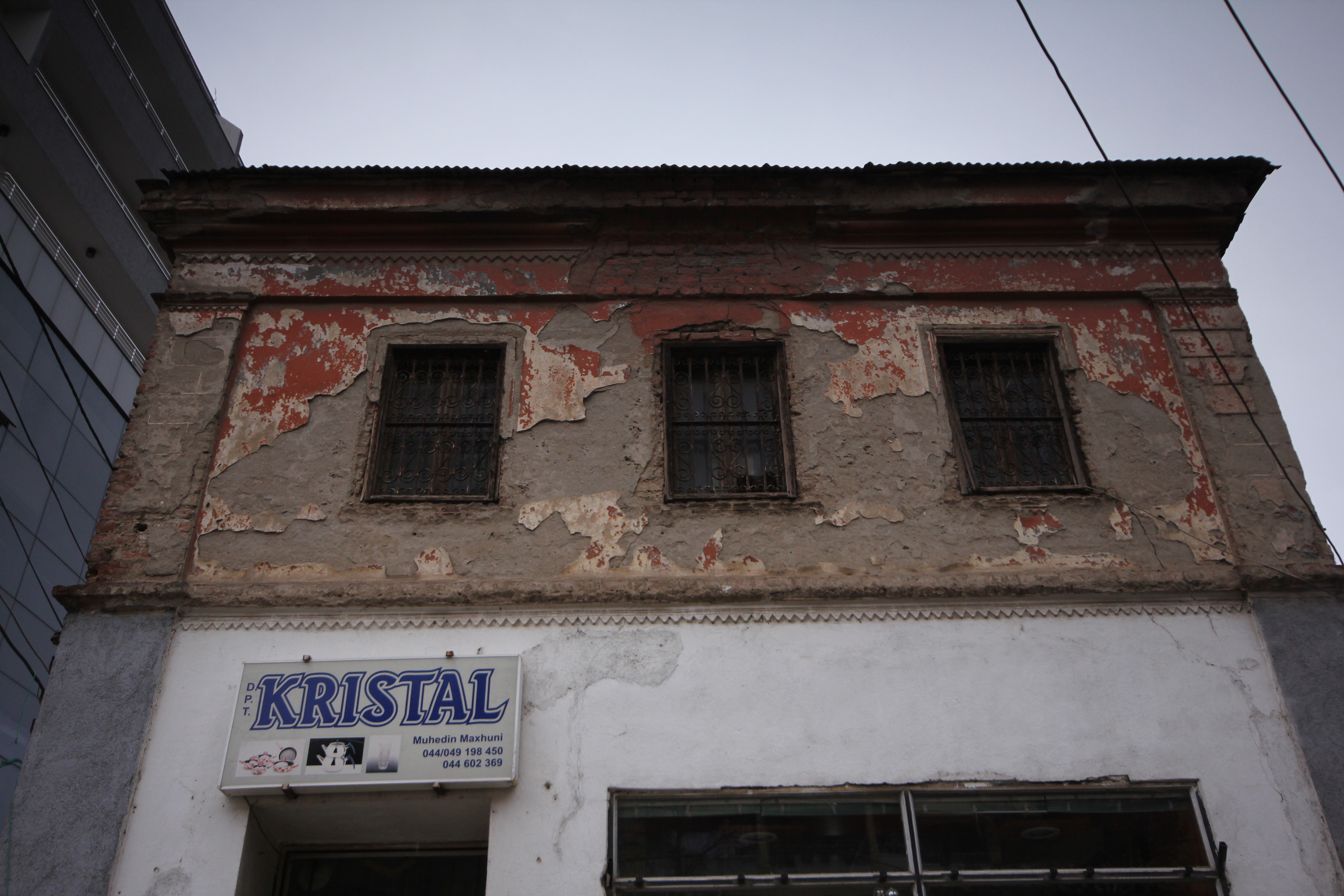
- Interactive map of Former Historical Archive in Vushtrri
- 42.82253°N 20.96467°E
- Location: Vushtrri, Kosovo

History
- Built: 20th century

The Former Historical Archive is a cultural heritage monument in Vushtrri, Kosovo.

== History ==
The former home of the municipality of Vushtrri's Historical Archive is two-story and was built of brick on a stone foundation. The ground floor includes a renovated western façade with a shop window, but the first floor is preserved in its original form inside and out. The western and northern front façades have wood-framed lighting racks with metal railings and a jagged ceiling. The north side front door today has its original half-arch molding. The Communal Historical Archives were founded on 3 March 1968, initially run by the Legal and General Affairs Administrative Directorate of the Municipal Assembly of Vushtrri.

== See also ==
- Vushtrri
- List of monuments in Vushtrri
