= Old Hamam (Vushtrri) =

Cultural heritage monument in Vushtrri, Kosovo

- Hamami i Gazi Ali Beut (Albanian)
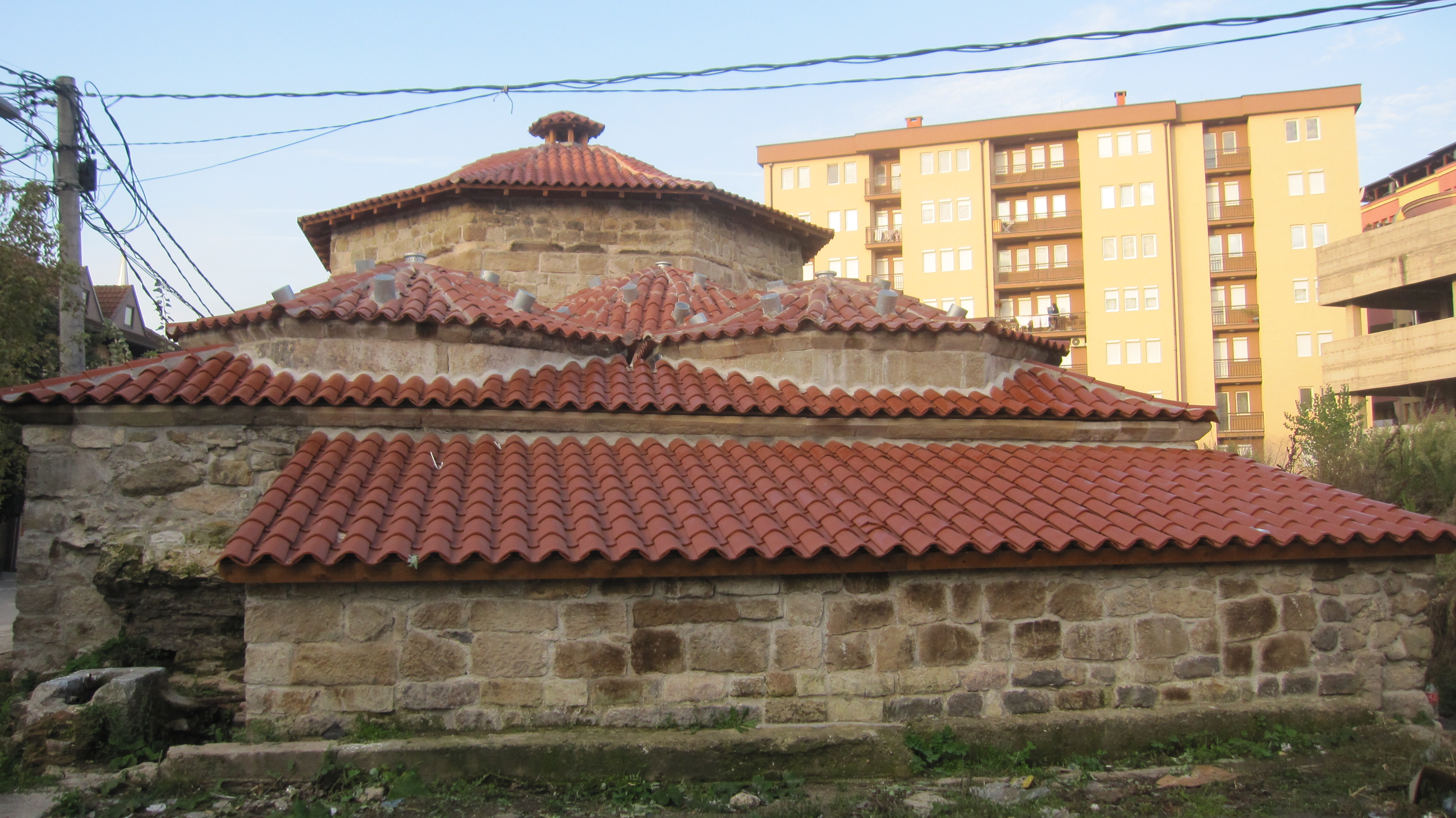
- Old Hamam of Vushtrri
- Interactive map of Old Hamam
- 42°49′18.0″N 20°57′51.5″E
- Location: Vushtrri, Kosovo

Cultural Heritage under Permanent Protection
- Official name: Hamami i Vjetër
- Type: Architectural Heritage: Monument/Ensemble
- Criteria: Under Protection
- Part of: Nr.v.E.K. 02-628/68
- Reference no.: 2850

The Old Hamam of Vushtrri (also known as the Gazi Ali Bey Hamam) is one of the oldest and most prominent monuments in Vushtrri, Kosovo.

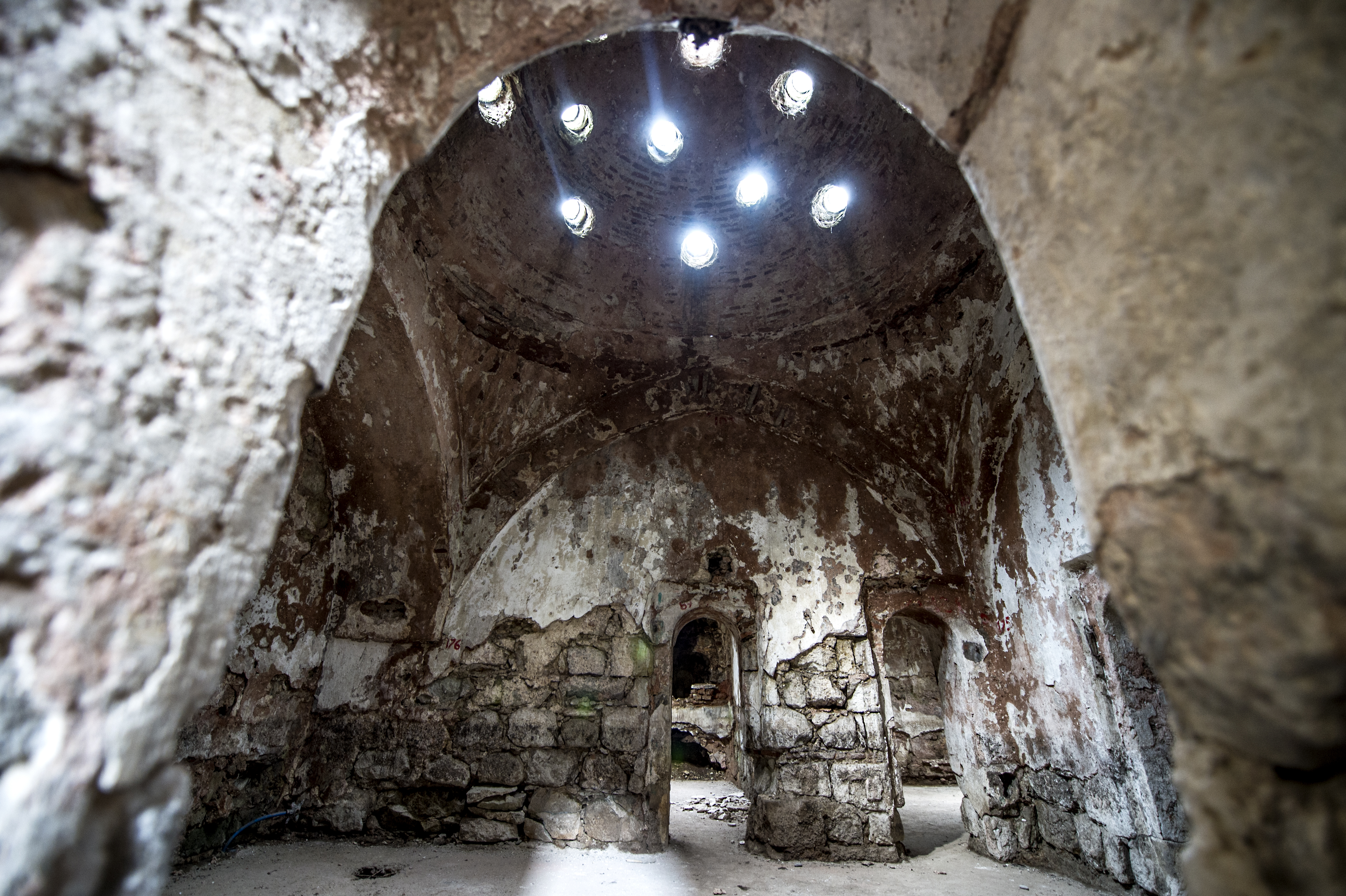
Old Hamam of Vushtrri, interior view

== History ==
Gazi Ali Bey Hamam is located in the old city center of Vushtrri, and was built by Gazi Ali Bey at the turn of the 14th and 15th centuries. Public baths were included for both sexes. The technically sophisticated building is an example of a "Tek" hamam, including a large lobby covered by a massive octagonal dome, a second room for heating and cleaning, and two alcoves paved with white marble for each gender to bathe. A kurna (stone bath) in each alcove was supplied by the central hot water tank. The women's alcove is similar in design to that in the Hamam of Peja. Clearly, the structure was built in two stages: first, the original floor and the three lower domes; followed by the outer entryway of volcanic tuff and spanning the entire perimeter of the building, dating to the 17th century. Unused since the 1970s, the facility was renovated during the period August 2013 to May 2014 with a focus on its façade and cupola .

== See also ==
- Gazi Ali Beg Mosque
- List of monuments in Vushtrri

== Gallery ==
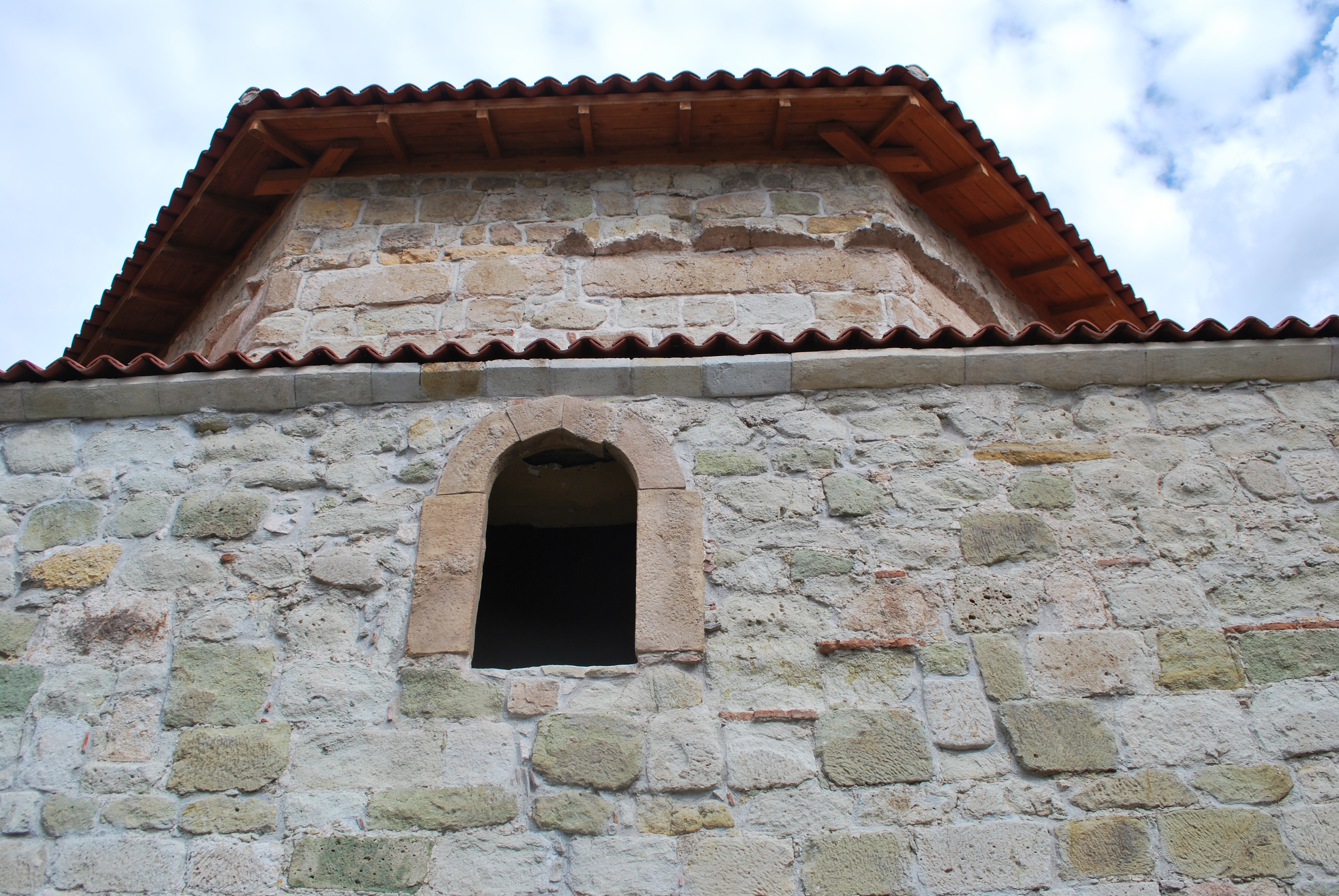

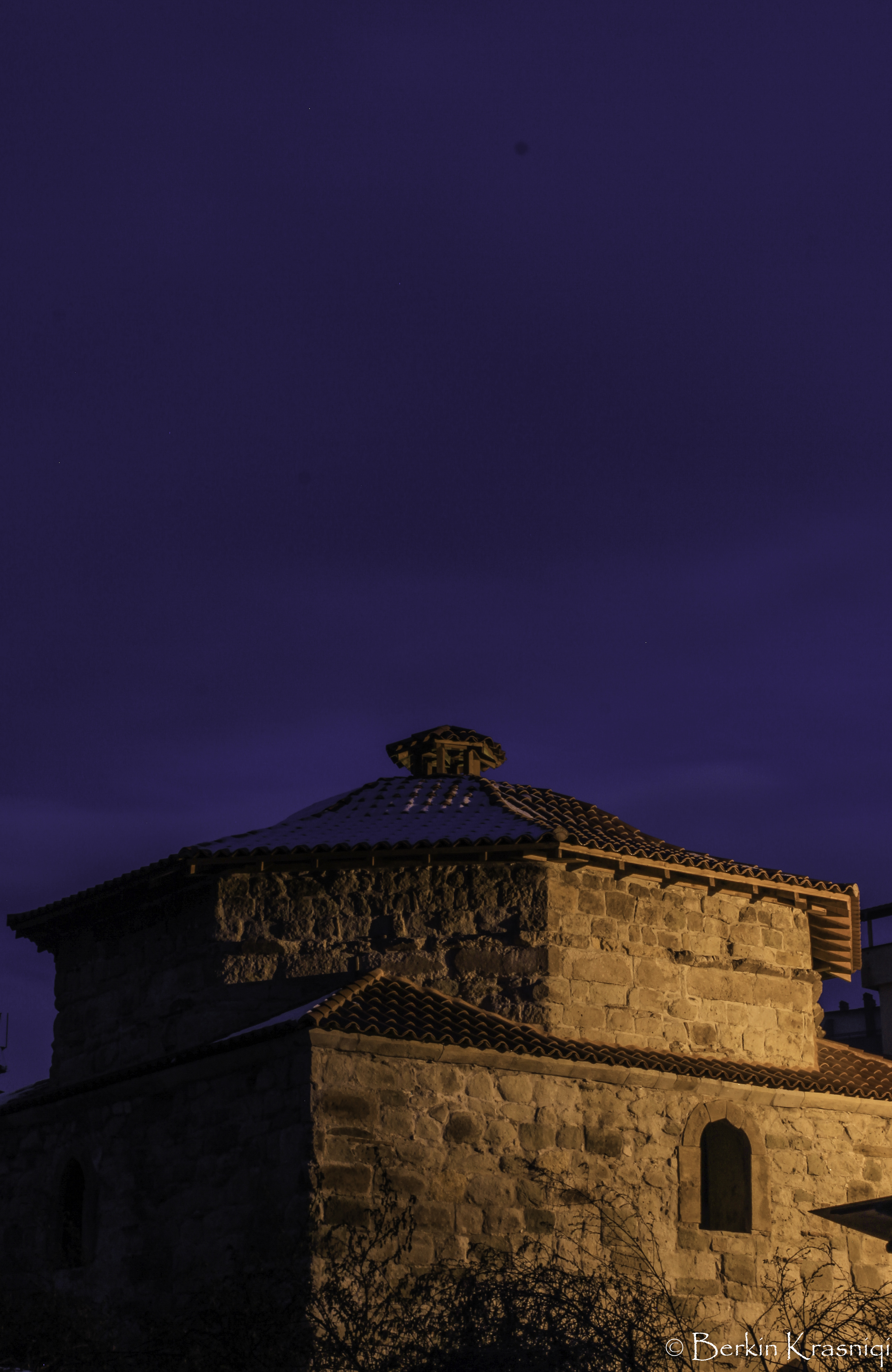

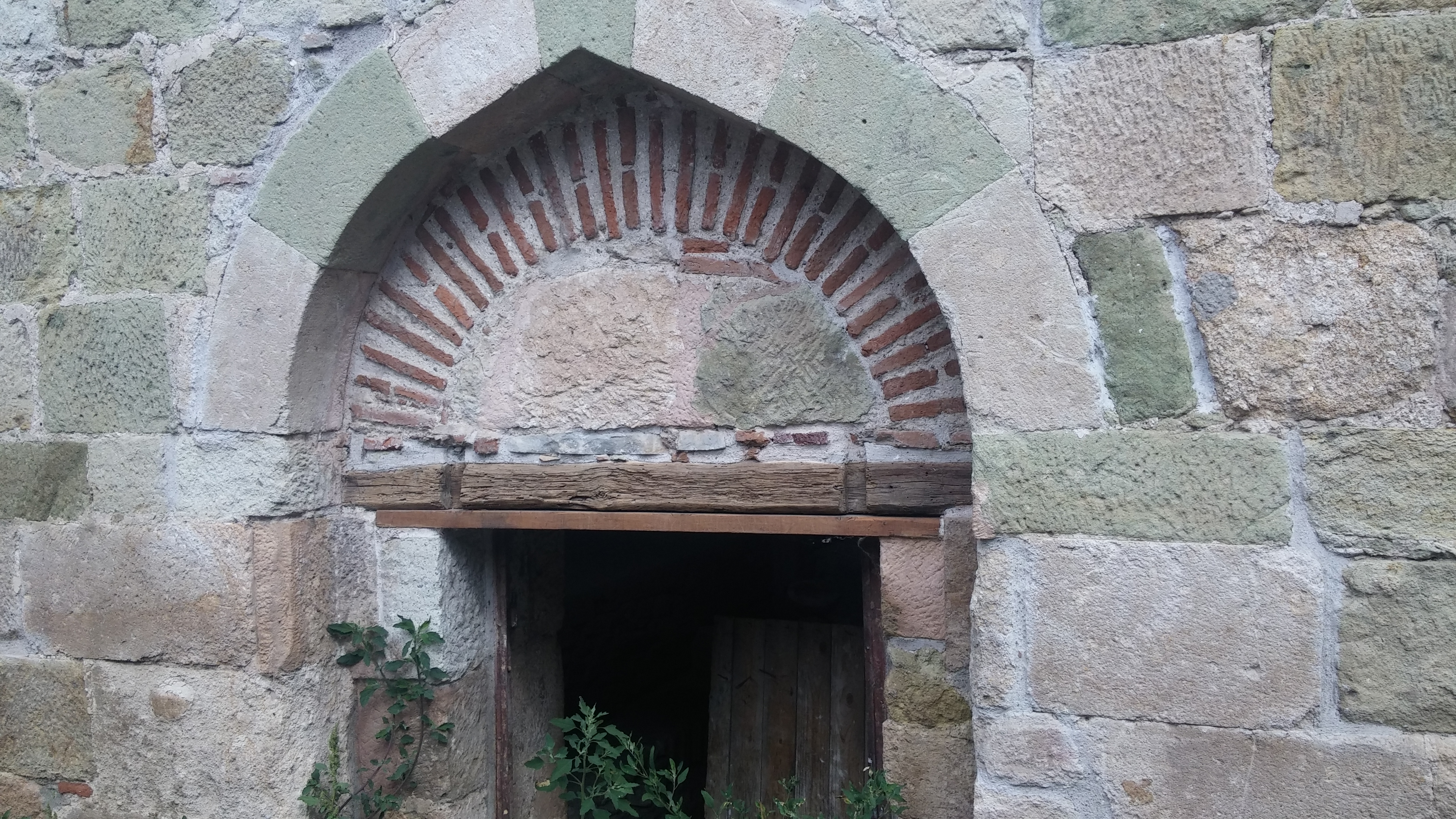

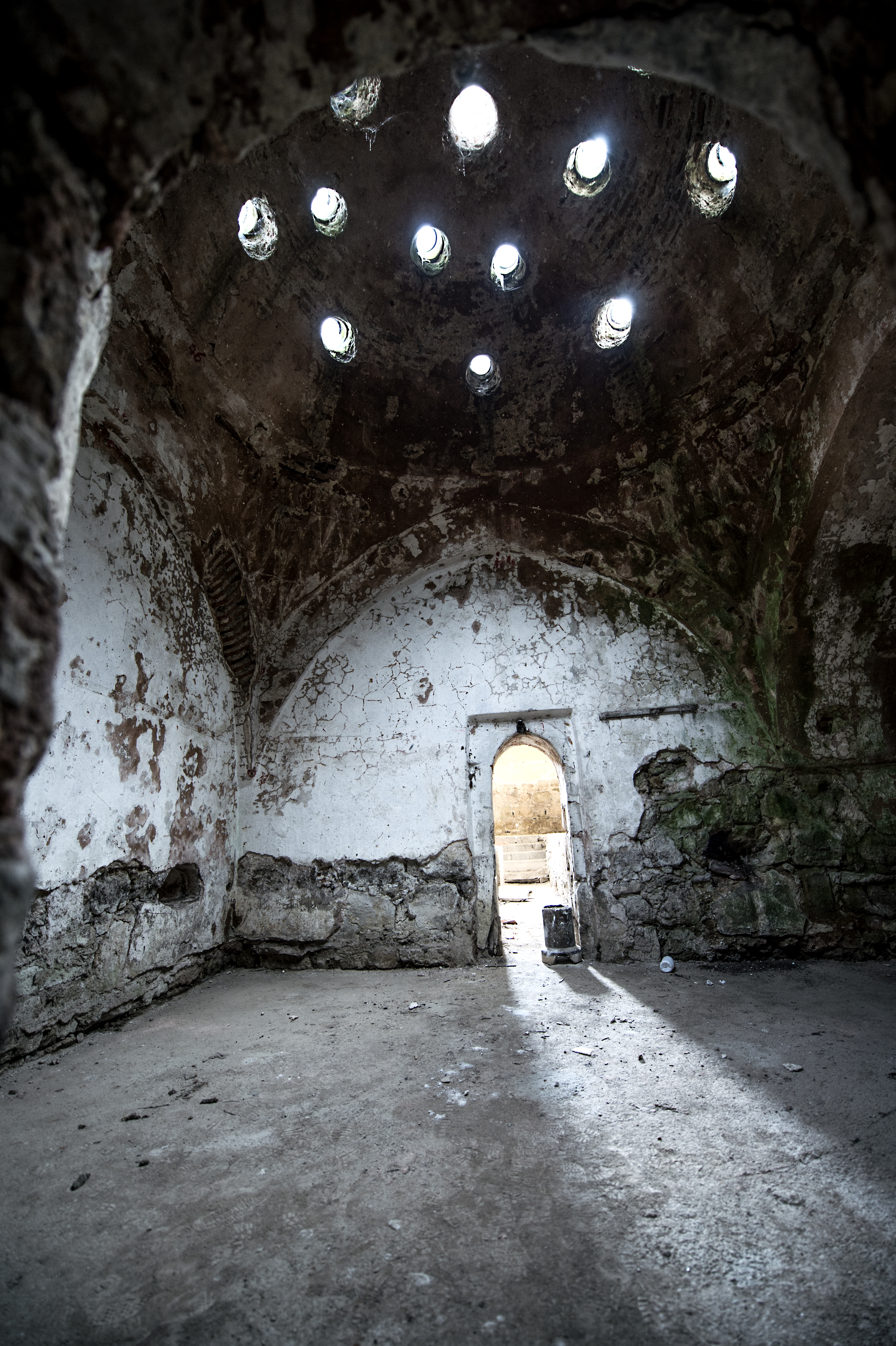

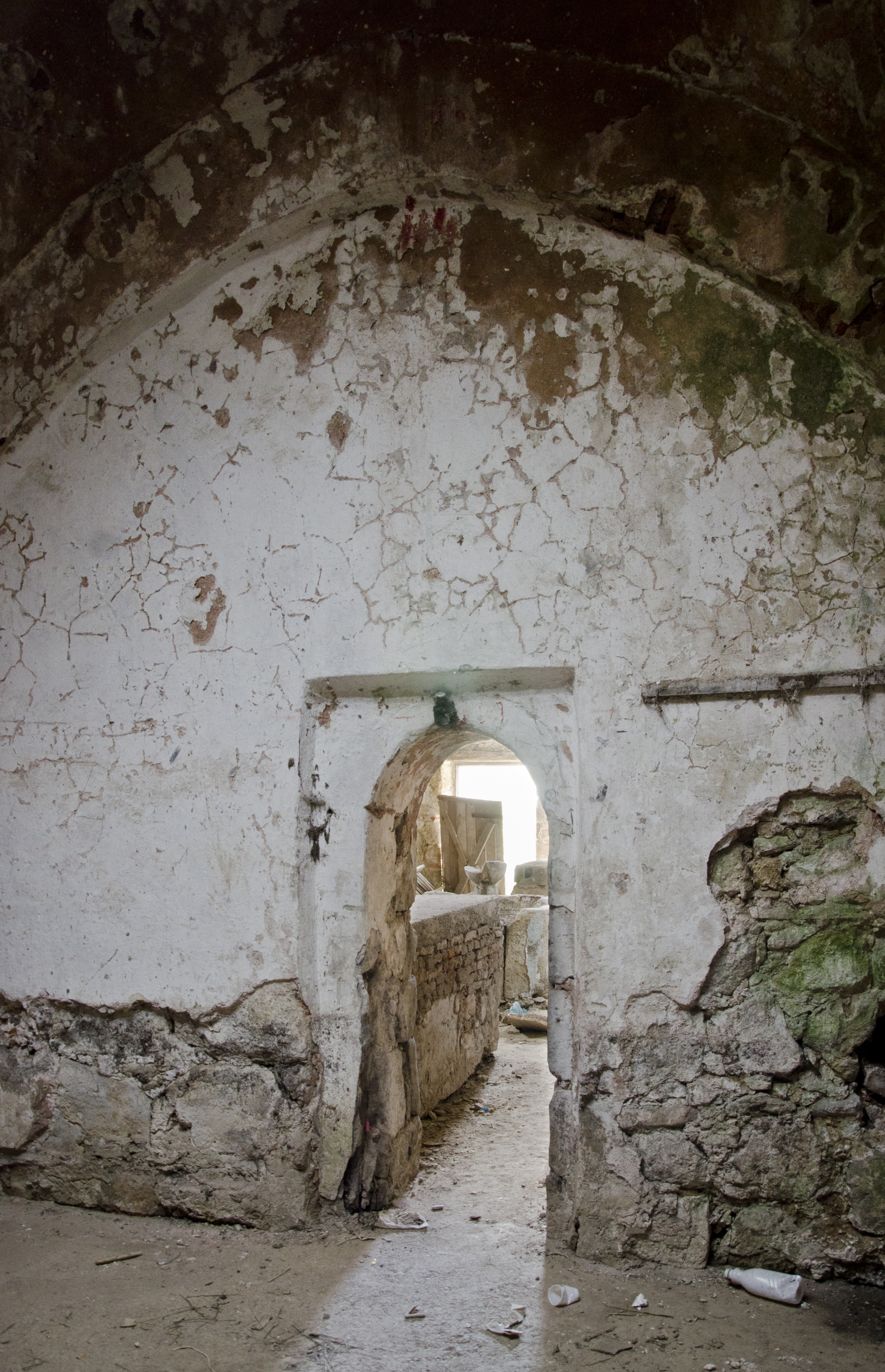

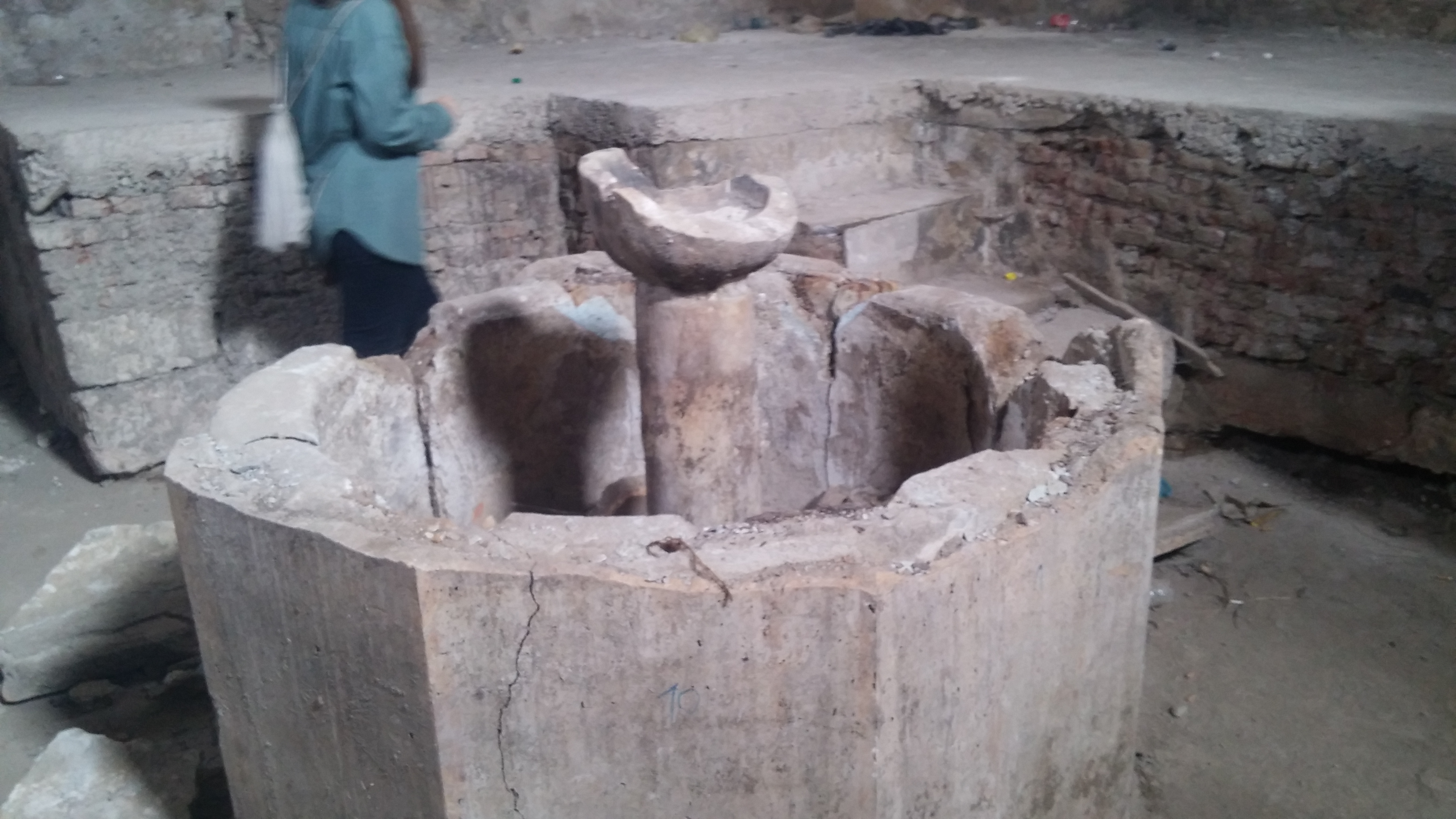

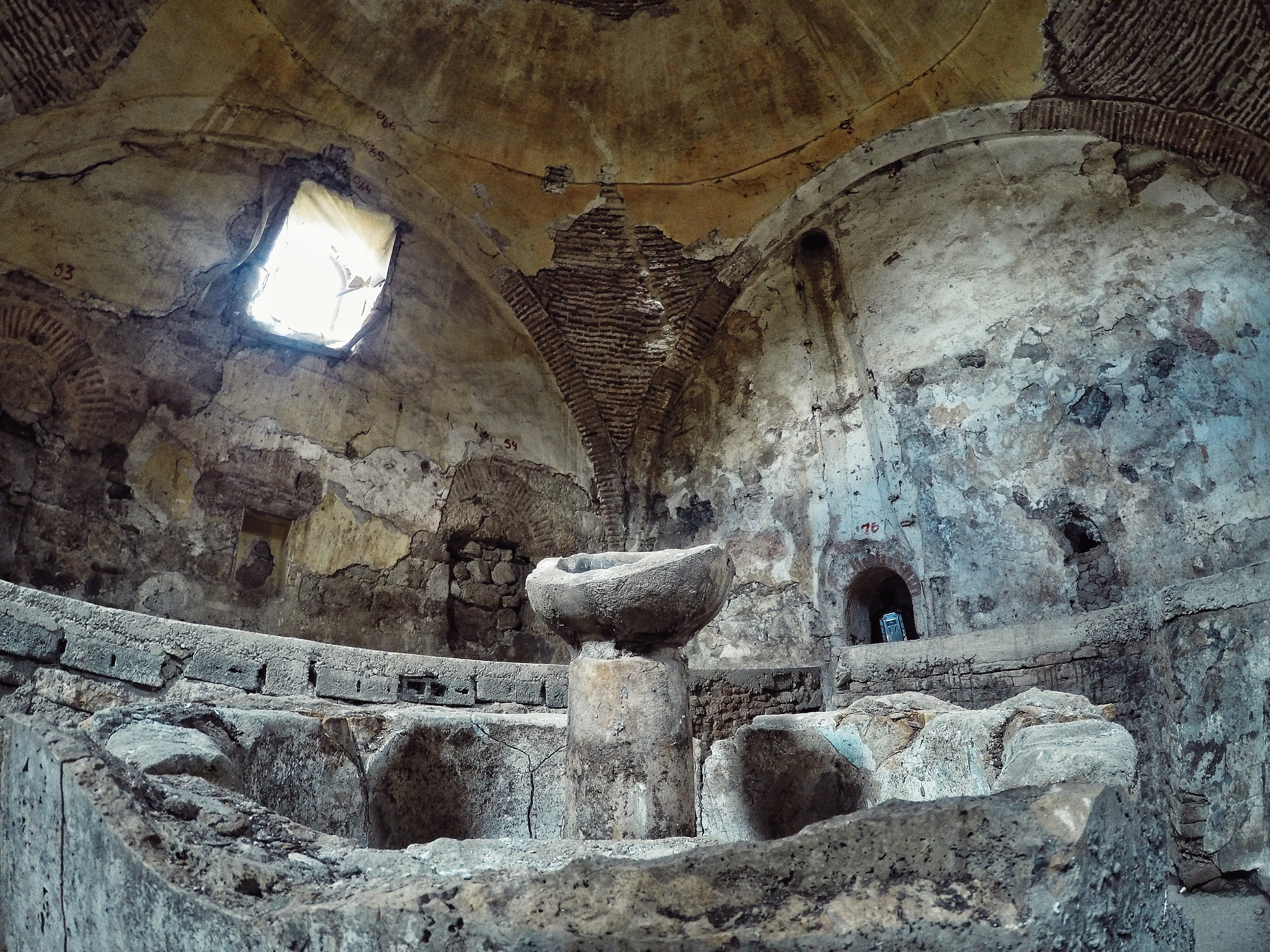
