= Stroc Castle =

- Kalaja Gjyteti në Strofc (Albanian)
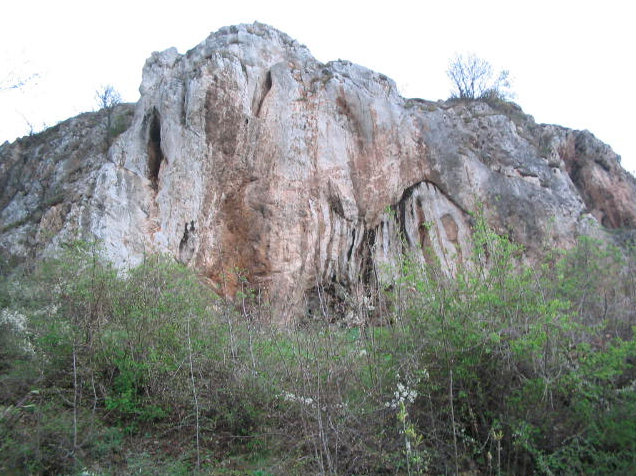
- Location: Stroc, Vushtrri, Kosovo

History
- Built: Antiquity

The Stroc Castle is a cultural heritage monument in Stroc, Vushtrri, Kosovo.

== History ==
Gradina Castle, in the village of Stroc, shows evidence of settlement in prehistory, late antiquity, and the Early Middle Ages. Cascade walls terraced on the slopes of the hill remain visible, including ones up to 2 metres (6.6 ft) thick. All evidence from the organization and remains found indicate a local ancient relic.

== See also ==
- Viciano
- List of monuments in Vushtrri
