= Maletaj architectural complex =

Cultural heritage monument of Kosovo

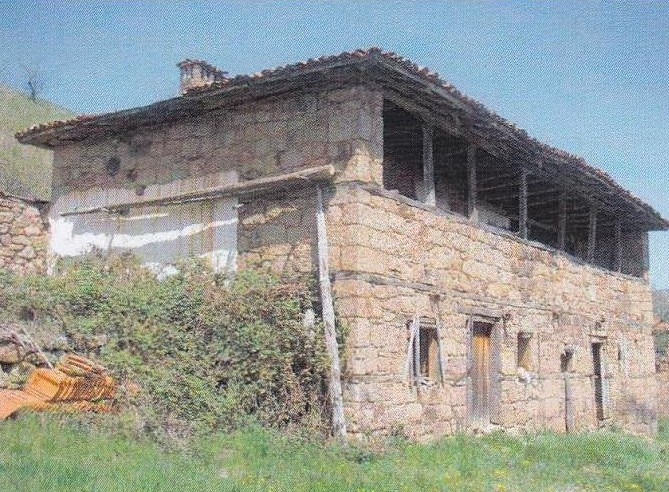
A house in the architectural complex in Maletaj

The Architectural complex in Maletaj is a cultural heritage monument located in Maletaj (Gumnisht), Vushtrri, Kosovo. This monument is of the "Architectural" category, approved with number.

== Overview ==
Maletaj or Gumnishta is situated 18 kilometers in the north-east side of the Municipality of Vushtrri. In this village is found a Dardani location named Katunishte. The substructure of this location is situated in a valley that has the form of the letter T. It has three entrances and it is all enclosed. The main entrance is called "The doors of Katunishta" (Albanian: "Dyert e Katunishtes"). Next to this location is situated "The Hill of Church" where is the groundwork of the church. None of this locations has not been studied yet. In this village was found an altar of the Antiquity period, with inscription that has not been deciphered yet because it is very damaged. Mycrotoponyms in Maletaj: The Crown Mountain, The Goddess Creek, Venc Hill, Creek above Torishta, Fountain of Mata, Fountain of Nika etc.

== Gallery ==
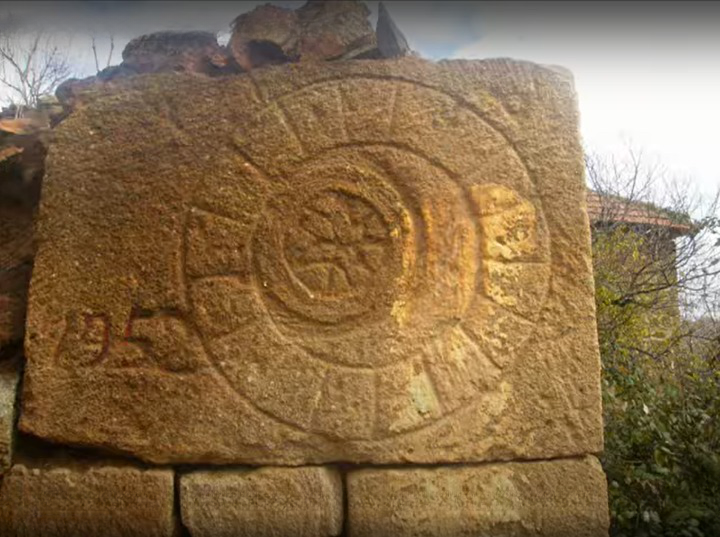
Inscription from a tower in Maletaj

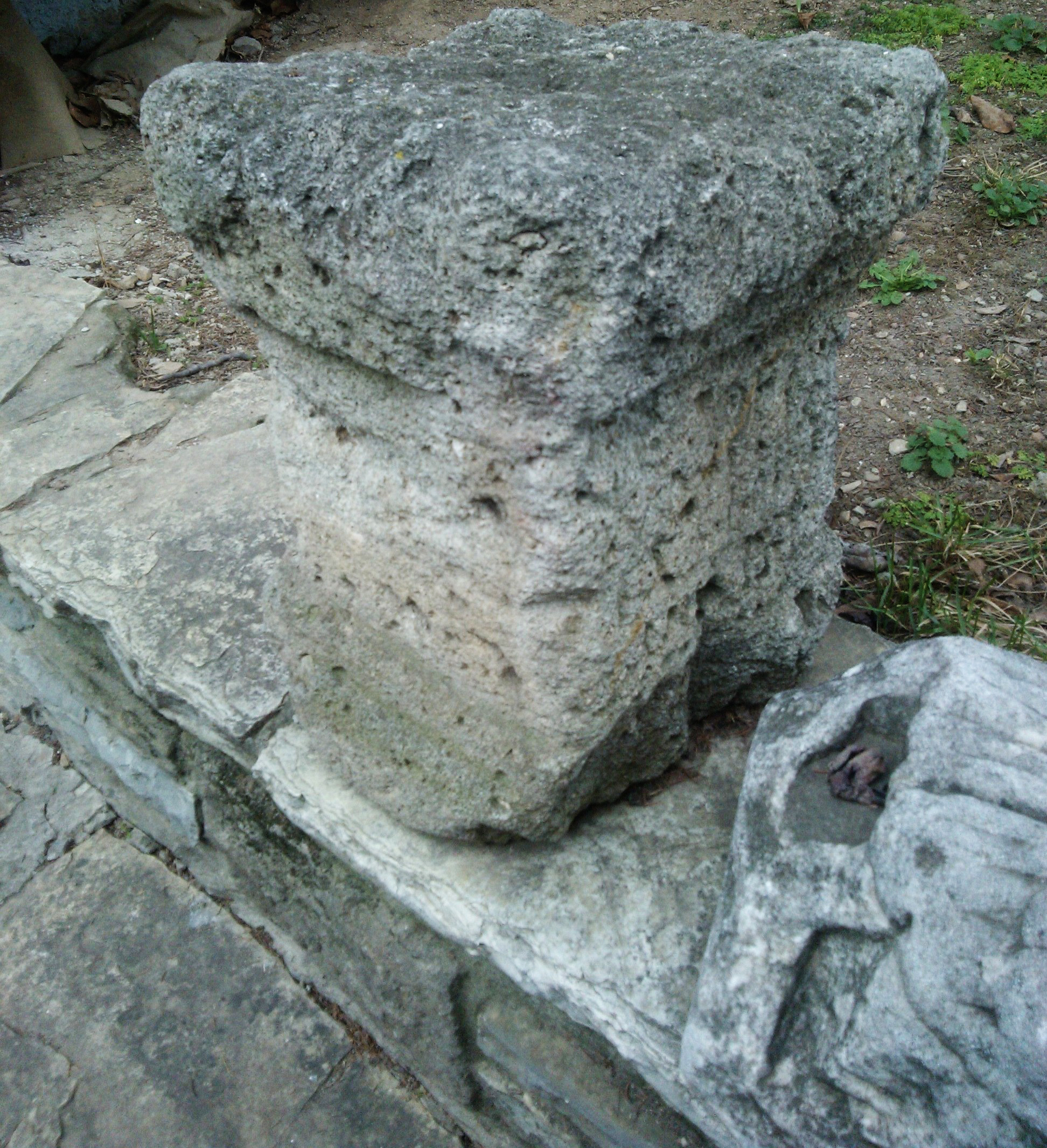
Prehistoric altar from Maletaj

== See also ==
- List of monuments in Vushtrri
