= Tower of Azem and Shote Galica =

Cultural heritage monument of Kosovo

The Azem and Shote Galica Tower Kulla e Azem dhe Shote Galicës
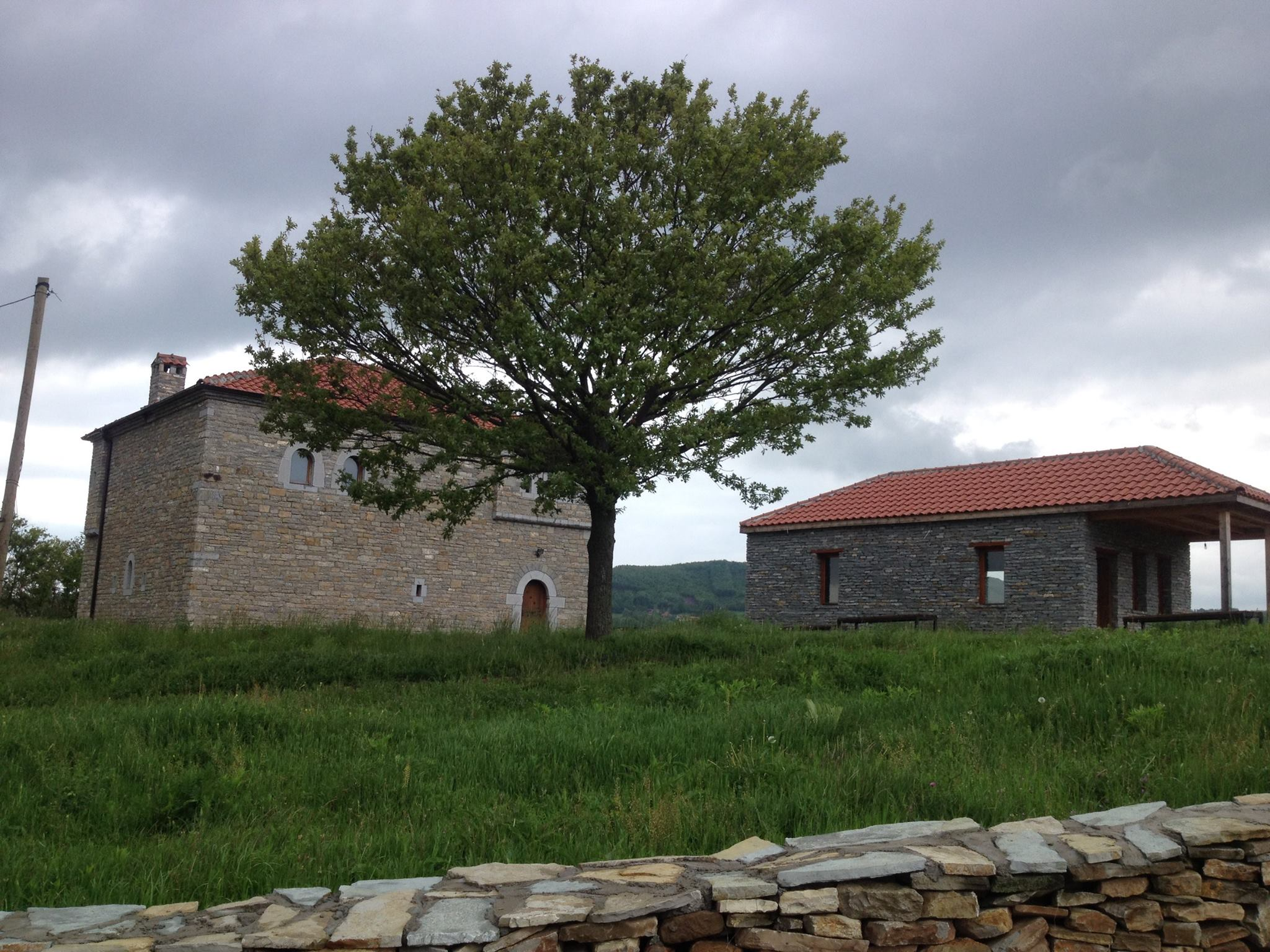
- Interactive map of The Azem and Shote Galica Tower; Kulla e Azem dhe Shote Galicës
- Location: Galica, (Drenica); Vushtrri, Kosovo
- Coordinates: 42°47′06″N 20°51′40″E
- Type: Tower
- Material: Stone
- Completion date: 1923

The Tower of Azem and Shote Galica (Albanian: Kulla e Azem dhe Shotë Galicës) is a cultural heritage monument located in Galica, Vushtrri Municipality, in Kosovo. This monument is classified as "architectural" and has been approved with the number 4019.

== Overview ==
During the existence of the Free Zone in Drenica, known as Little Arberia, a voluntary action led to the construction of a tower for Azem Bejtë Galica. The tower was built in Galica, the village where Azem was born and raised. In the summer of 1923, specifically in July, with the help of local and other residents, the construction of the tower was successfully completed.

The tower had windows facing south and was divided by a foundational wall into two parts. The ground floor of the western part of the tower served as a stable for the horses of Azem and Shote Galica, while the second floor was used for guests. The ground floor of the eastern part of the tower served as a kitchen for bread preparation, while the second floor had four sleeping rooms.

The Tower of Azem and Shote Galica was destroyed in the fall of 1924, after the Battle of Little Arberia, during which Azem Galica and several of his comrades were killed, leading to the disbandment of the Free Zone of Drenica, known as Little Arberia. After the end of the Kosovo Liberation War (1999), new circumstances emerged. In 2010, it was decided to rebuild the Tower of Azem Bejta in his birthplace, Galica, in the Vushtrri Municipality. The reconstruction work began on July 16, 2010, on the occasion of the 86th anniversary of Azem Bejtë's heroic death.

Throughout its history, the tower has been damaged several times, including during the siege by Serbian forces in 1924. It has since been restored and stands today as a popular tourist destination, symbolizing the bravery and struggle of the Albanian people for freedom and independence.

== Gallery ==
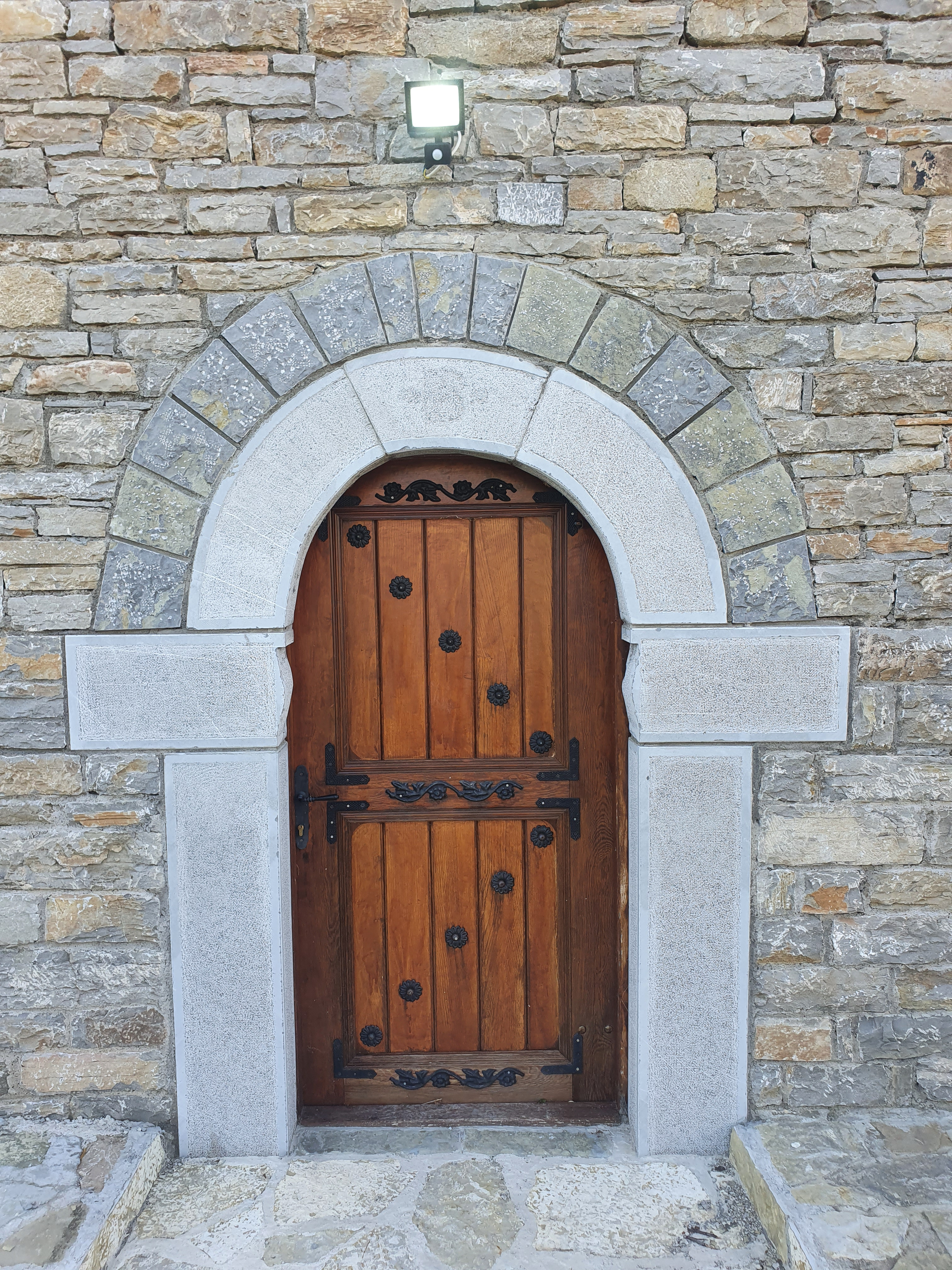

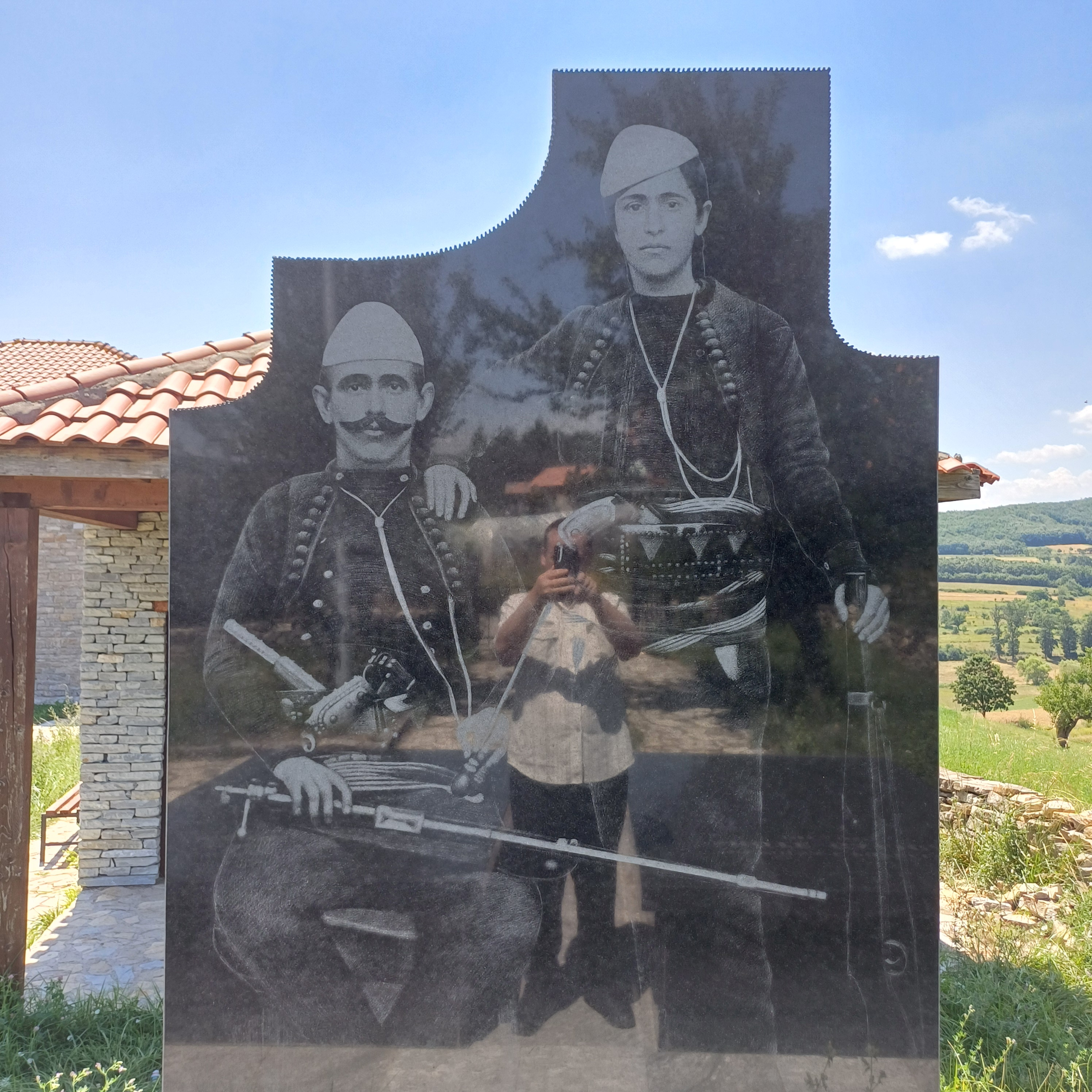

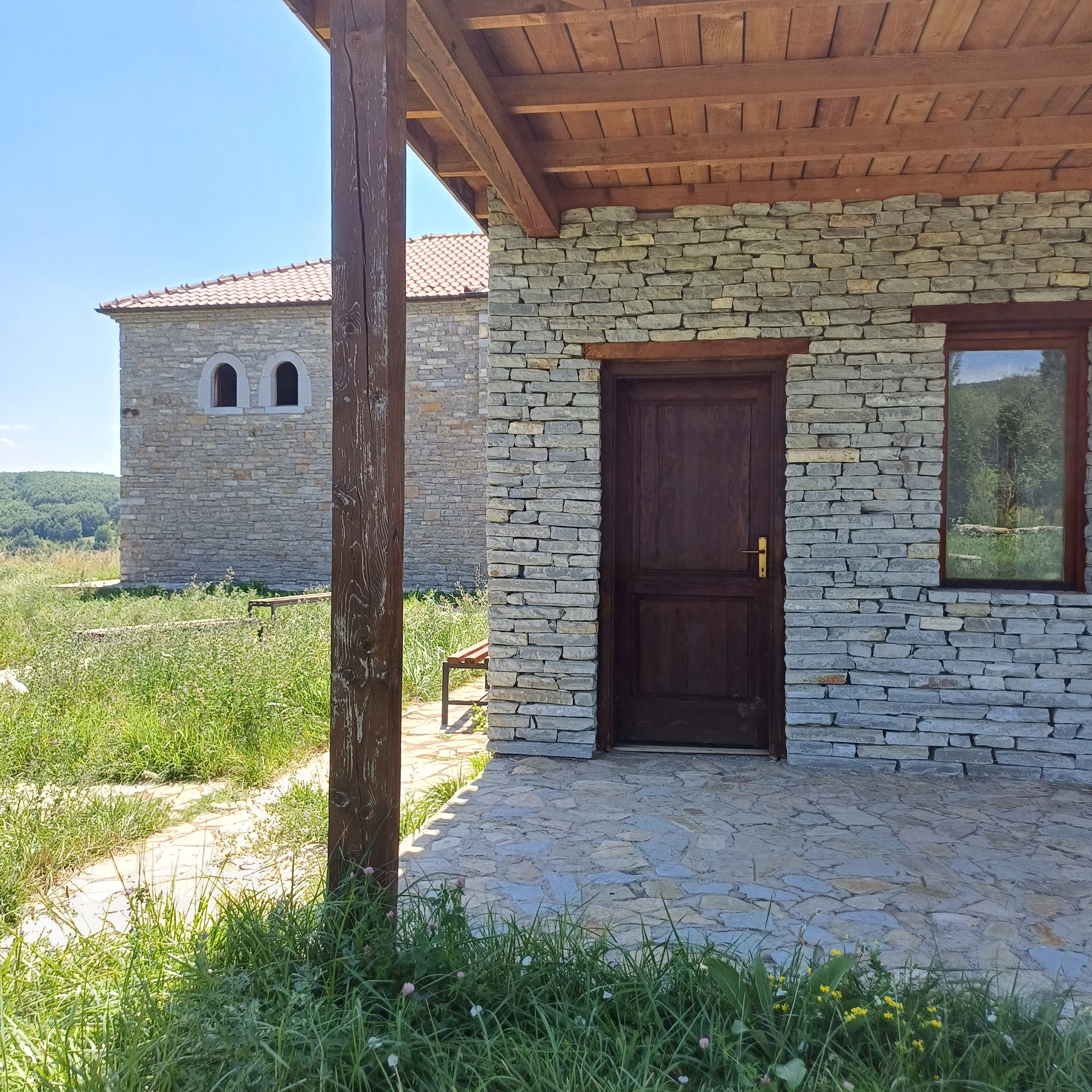

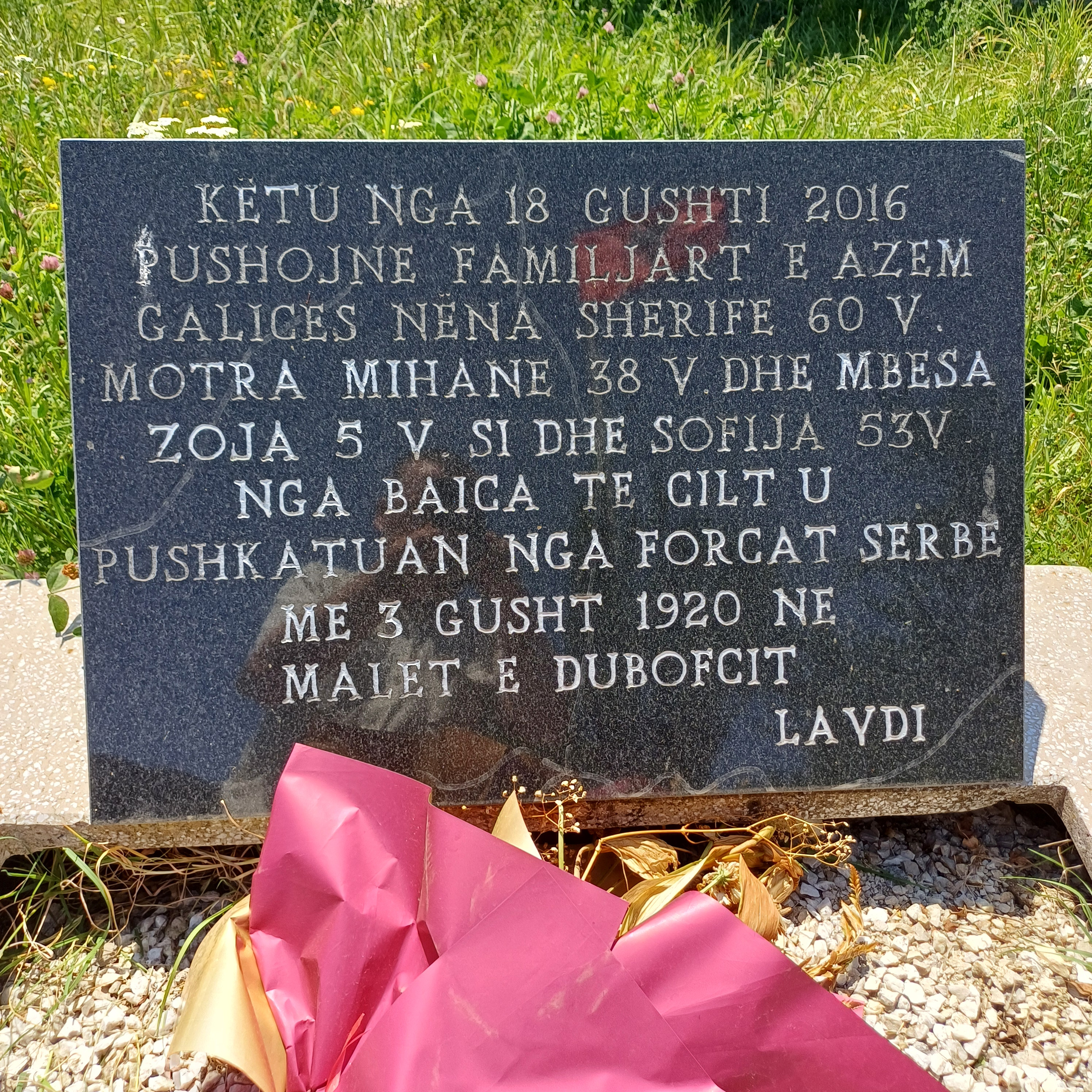

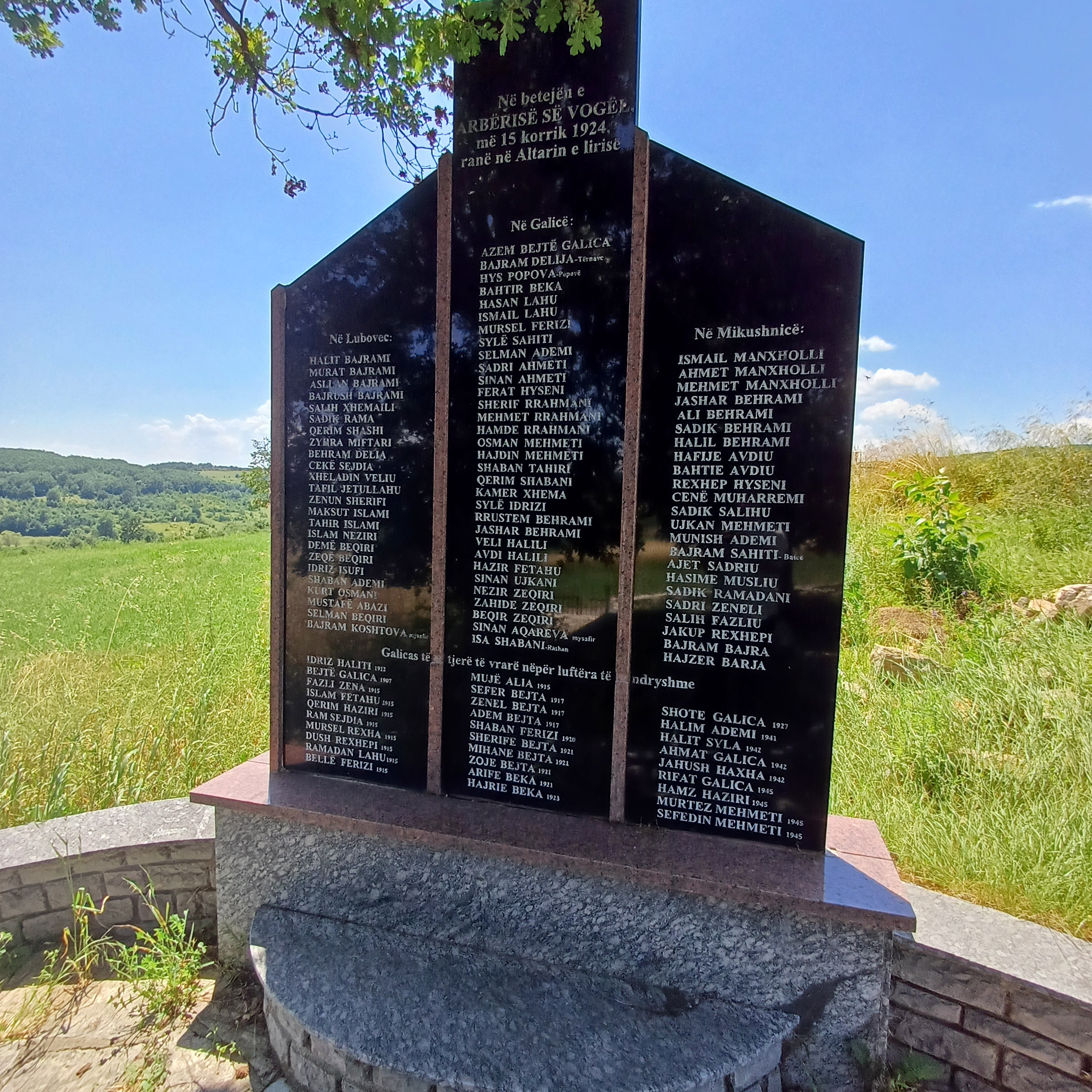

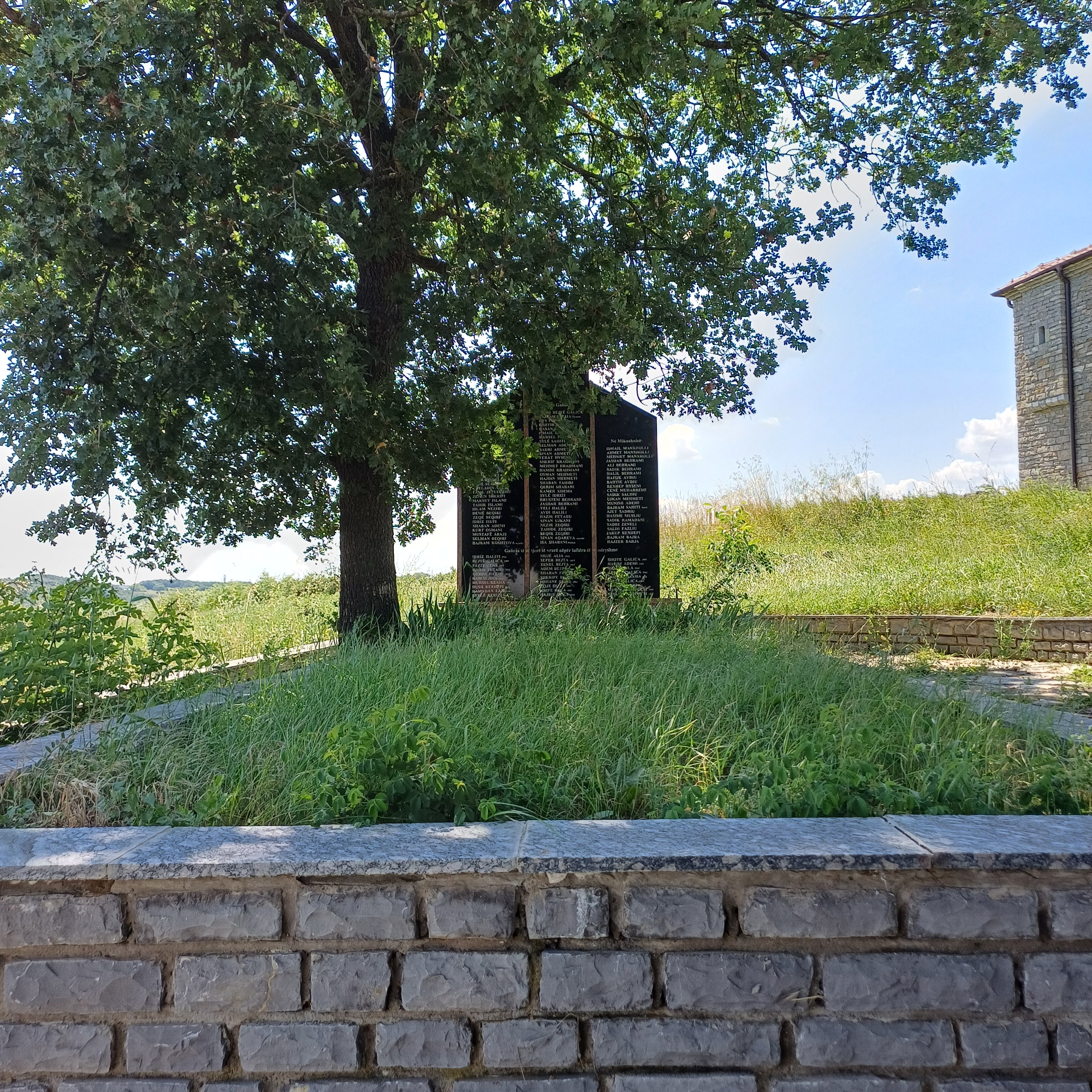

== See also ==
- Drenica
- List of monuments in Vushtrri
