= Oshlak Strict Nature Reserve =

- IUCN category Ia (strict nature reserve)
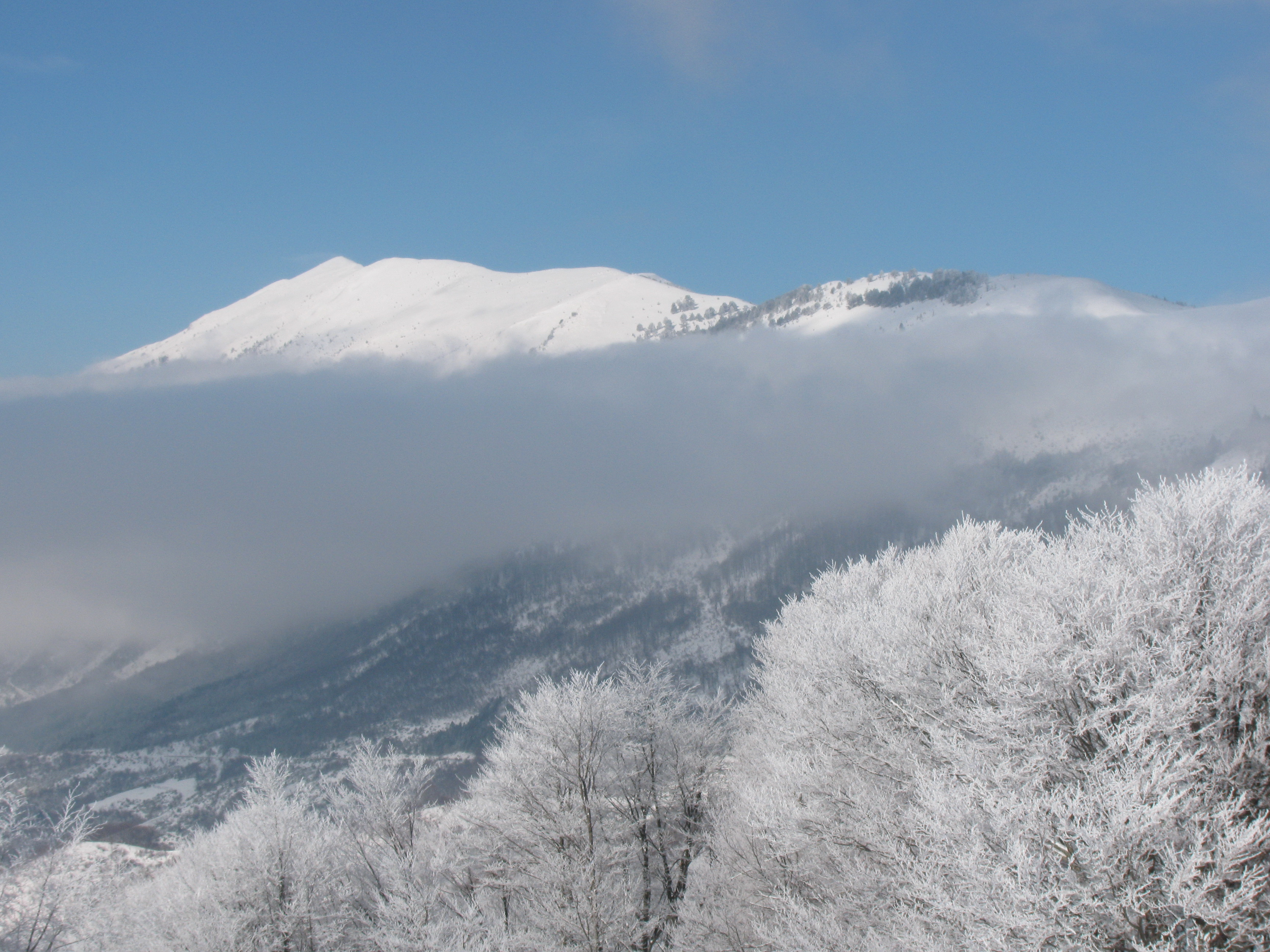
- Peak of Oshlak

- Location within Kosovo Location within Europe
- Location: District of Prizren and Ferizaj, Kosovo
- Nearest city: Prizren, Ferizaj
- Coordinates: 42°11′48″N 20°53′31″E
- Area: 20 ha (0.20 km^{2})
- Established: 1960

The Oshlak Strict Nature Reserve (Albanian: Rezervat Strikt i Natyrës Oshlaku; Serbian: Строги природни резерват Ошљак / Strogi prirodni rezervat Ošljak) is a strict nature reserve in the District of Prizren and Ferizaj of Southeastern Kosovo. The reserve encompasses 20 hectares (0.20 square kilometres) of mountainous and hilly terrain, small lakes and wide forests with numerous of the related flora and fauna. It is entirely located within the Sharr Mountains National Park, one of the two national parks of Kosovo.

In terms of phytogeographically, the reserve falls within the balkan mixed forests terrestrial ecoregion of the Palearctic temperate broadleaf and mixed forest biome. It possesses coniferous, mixed, and deciduous forests that constitute the ideal habitat for numerous animals, birds and plants. The forests are particular endowed with fir (silver fir), pine (Bosnian and macedonian pine) and oak (macedonian oak).

An extraordinary variety of wildlife species live in the region that are of high biodiversity value. Perhaps the most iconic species are the brown bear, red fox, roe deer, golden eagle, wild goat and wild boar. Nonetheless, relatively large shares of those species are threatened and endangered.

== See also ==
- Protected areas of Kosovo
- Geography of Kosovo
- Biodiversity of Kosovo
