= Stroc =

Village in Kosovo

Stroc Стровце (Strovce)
- Coordinates: 42°42′49″N 20°58′49″E
- Country: Kosovo
- District: District of Mitrovica
- Municipality: Vushtrri
- Elevation: 603 m (1,978 ft)

Population (2011)
  - Total: 865
- Postal code: 42000
- Area code: 28

Stroc is a village in the municipality of Vushtrri, Kosovo. It is the site of the Stroc Castle.

== Population ==
Population history
Year	Population
1948	535
1953	599
1961	640
1971	804
1981	1014
1991	1121
2011	865

In the census of 2011, there were 865 inhabitants in Stroc.
