= Bukoshi Oak =

Natural monument in Kosovo

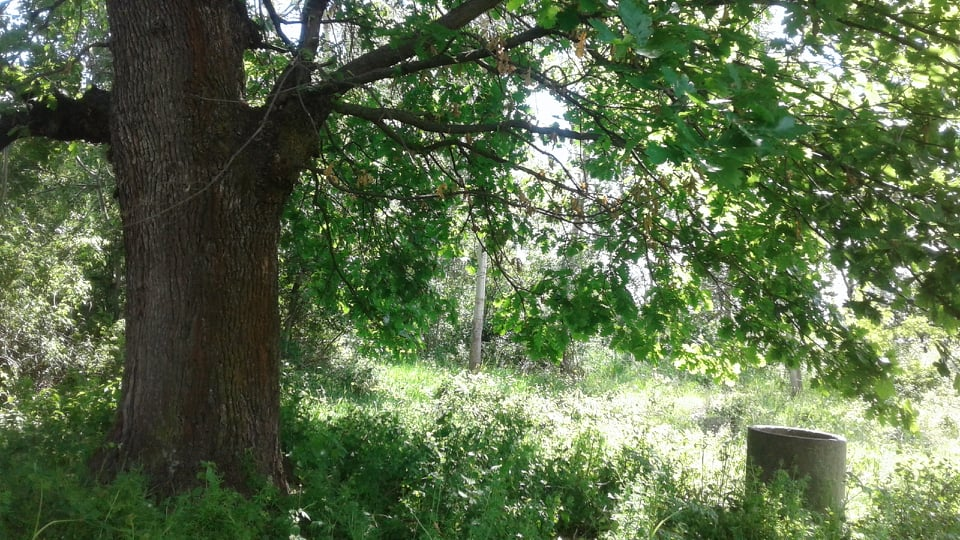
- The Bukoshi Oak in May 2019
- Native name: Lisi i Bukoshit (Albanian)
- Species: Oak (Quercus)
- Location: Bukoshi, Vushtrri Kosovo
- Coordinates: 42.803972°N 20.925889°E
- Date seeded: Circa 1870; 155 years ago

The Bukoshi Oak is a natural heritage monument of botanical character, located in the village of Bukosh in Vushtrri Municipality, Kosovo.

== History ==
The Bukoshi Oak is an oak tree (genus Quercus) with trunk perimeter dimensions which at the base of the trunk are 3.10 cm (1.22 in) while the maximum length / height of its crown is about 22 m (72 ft ). Its exact age is not known, but it is said that when the construction of the railway line Skopje - Fushë Kosova - Mitrovica began, this oak was a small sapling near a freshwater spring. (It is known that the construction of this railway was completed in 1874). Near the oak, at the site of a former freshwater spring, there is now a well, which also gives the monument a hydrological character too.

== See also ==
- Natural heritage
- Natural monument
