= Bukosh, Vushtrri =

Bukosh: Bukosh (Albanian); Букош/Bukoš (Serbian)
- Village
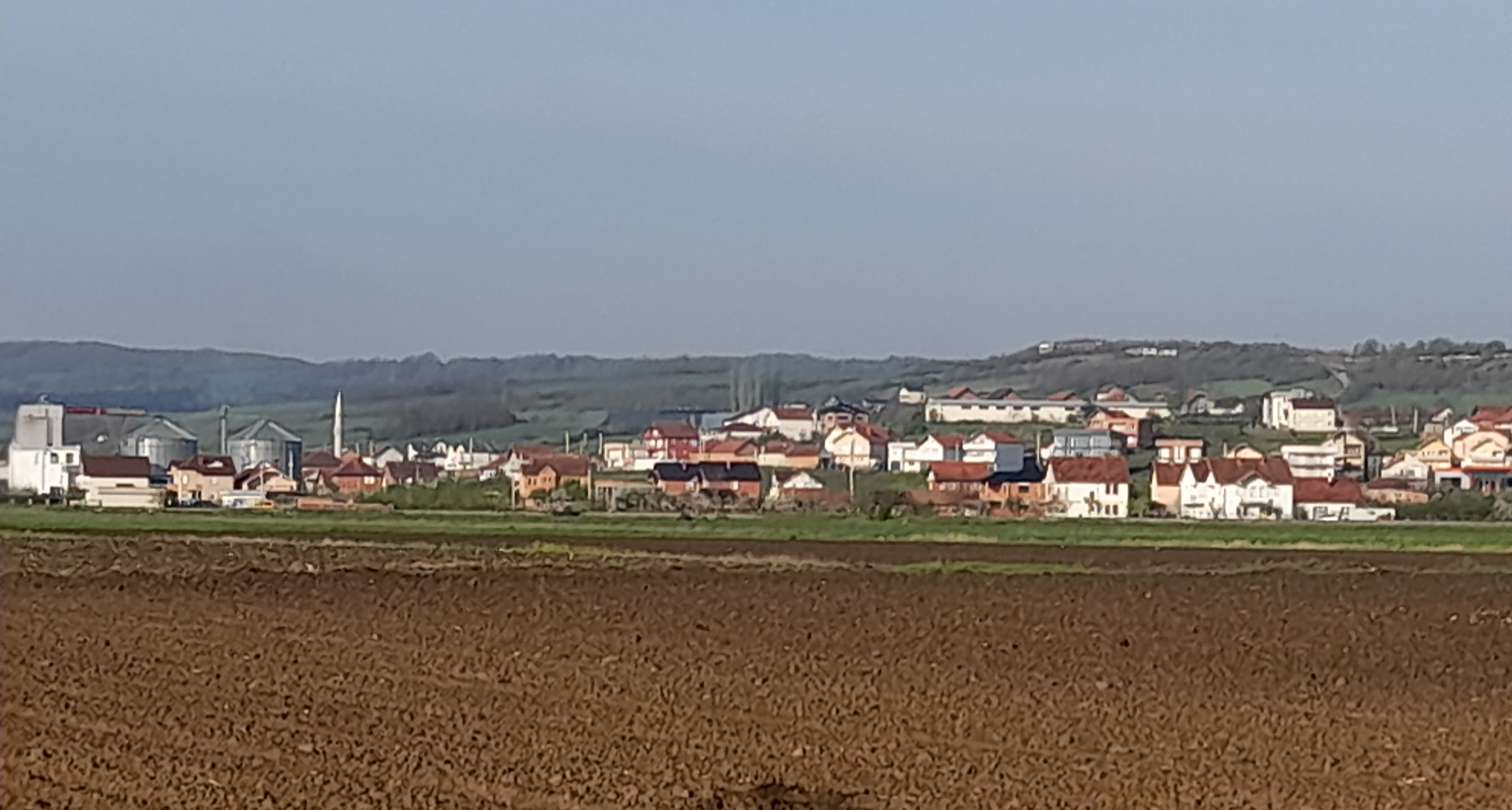
- Bukosh, Vushtrri
- Interactive map of Bukosh
- Coordinates: 42°48′11″N 20°55′44″E
- Location: Kosovo
- District: Mitrovicë
- Municipality: Vushtrri
- Elevation: 1,097 m (3,599 ft)

Population (2011)
  - Total: 1,171
- Time zone: UTC+1 (CET)
  - Summer (DST): UTC+2 (CEST)

Bukosh (Albanian: Bukoshi), is a village in the Vushtrri municipality in Kosovo. It is inhabited by a majority of ethnic Albanians.

== History ==
Bukosh was first mentioned in the 1530 Ottoman defter, as a village in the Sanjak of Viçitrina. It was recorded in the 1566–1574 defter of the Sanjak of Viçitrina as well. It was included in an Austrian map based on data of 1689. It was recorded in the salname of the Kosovo Vilayet in the years 1893, 1896 and 1900.

== Demographics ==
=== Evolution of the population ===
| Year | 1574 | 1913 | 1921 | 1923 | 1948 | 1953 | 1961 | 1971 | 1981 | 1991 | 2011 |
|---|---|---|---|---|---|---|---|---|---|---|---|
| Number of inhabitants | 14 households + 2 singles | 259 | 160 | 31 households | 345 | 375 | 484 | 566 | 867 | 843 | 1171 |

== Business zone ==
The Vushtrri municipal assembly, during its session on March 27, 2008, decided to create a Business Zone (Industrial Zone) of common interest in the zone of Bukosh village with approximately surface area of 17.98.87 ha.

== See also ==
- Bukoshi Oak
