= Oshlak (mountain) =

Mountain in Kosovo

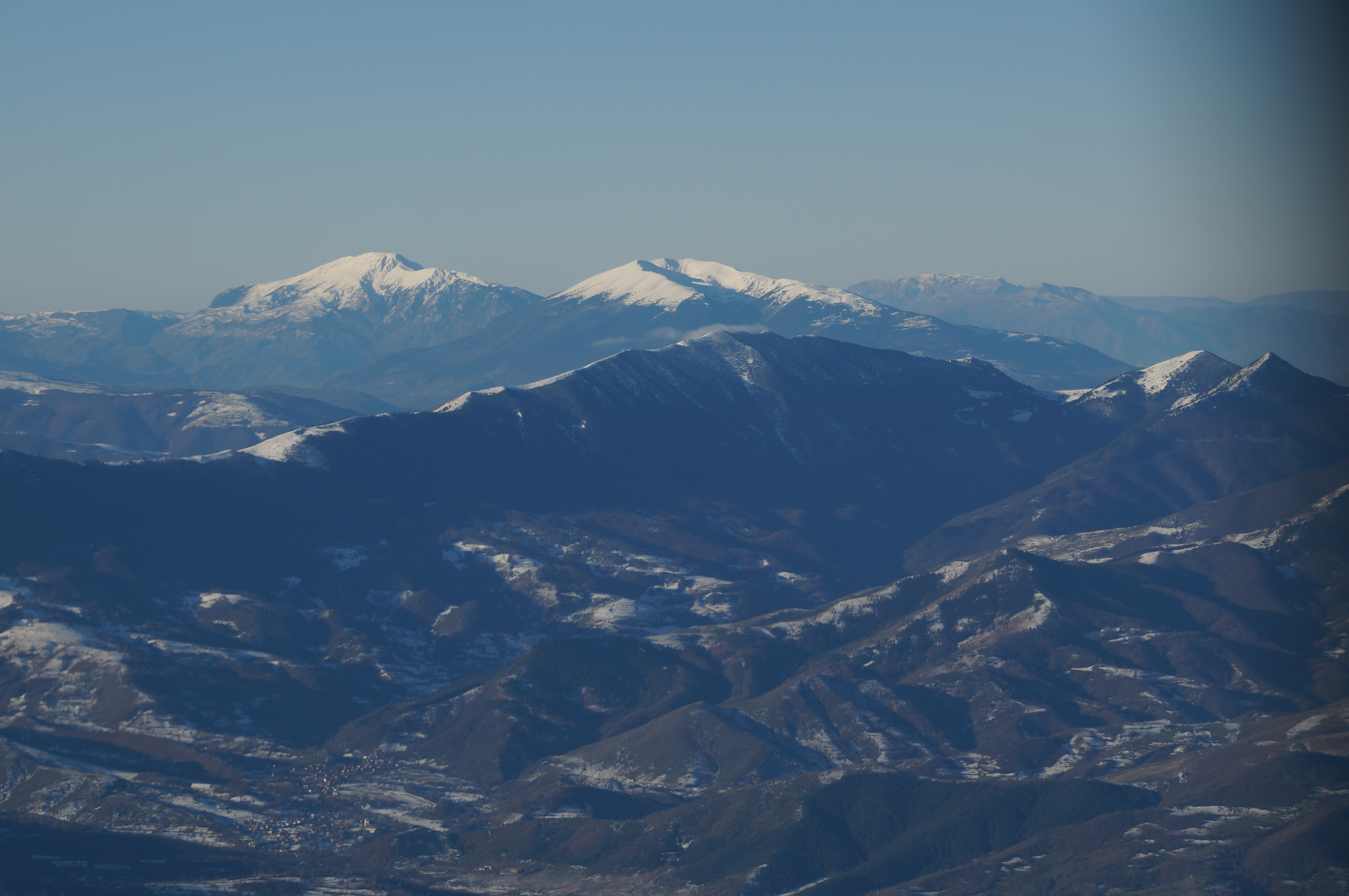
- Oshlak mountain in December, Gjallica and Koritnik in the background

Highest point
- Elevation: 2,212 m (7,257 ft)
- Coordinates: 42°11′38″N 20°54′45″E

Geography
- Location within Kosovo
- Country: Kosovo
- Parent range: Šar Mountains

Oshlak (Albanian: Oshlaku) or Ošljak (Serbian Cyrillic: Ошљак) is a mountain in the south of Kosovo. It is 2,212 metres (7,257 ft) high. Oshlak has steep slopes and its eastern side is connected to the Šar Mountains and its western side is connected to Jezerska planina.

The mountain is part of the Oshlak Strict Nature Reserve.

== See also ==
- List of mountains in Kosovo
- National parks of Kosovo
