= Duboc Fortress =

Cultural heritage monument of Kosovo

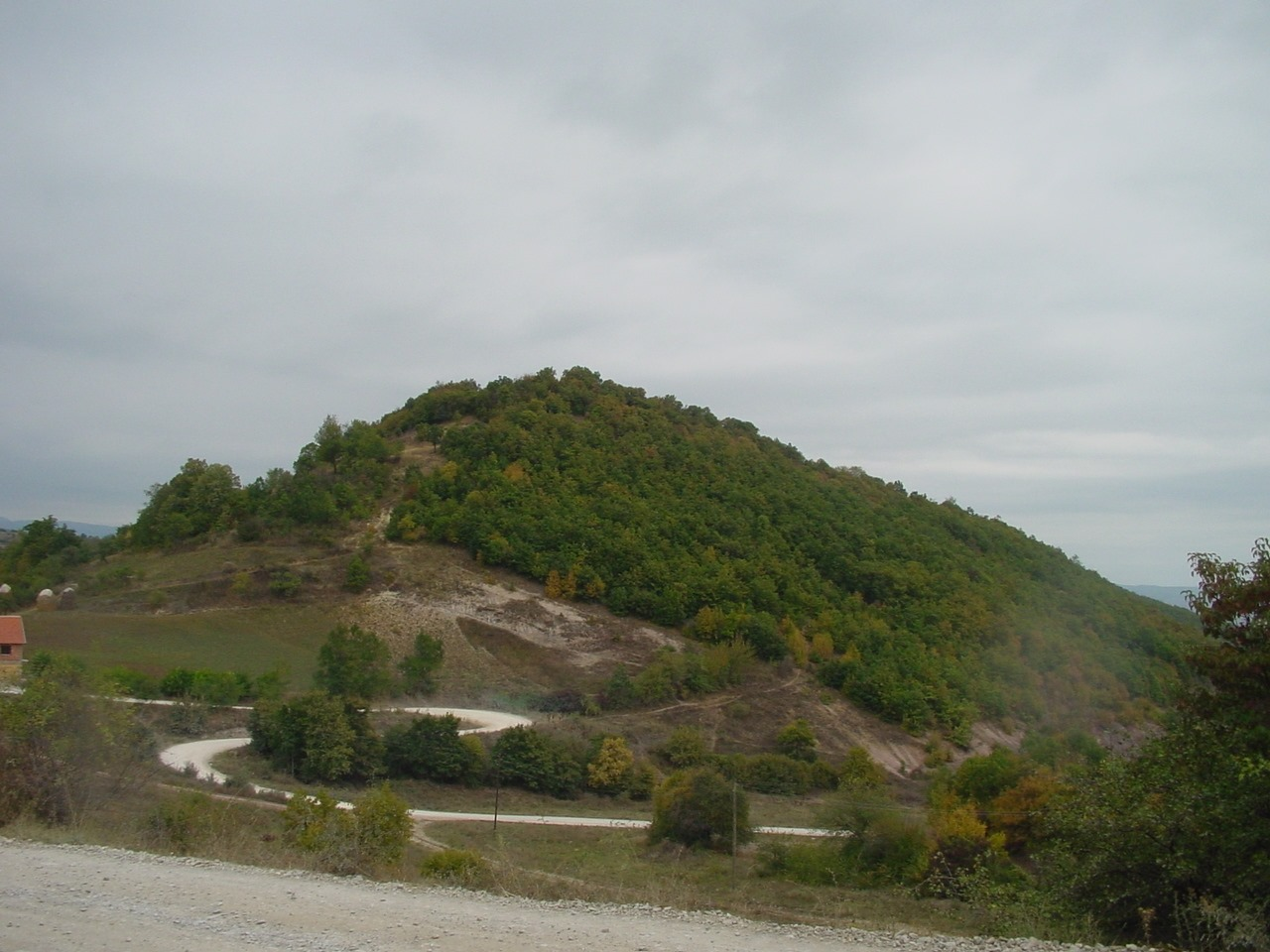
Duboc Fortress

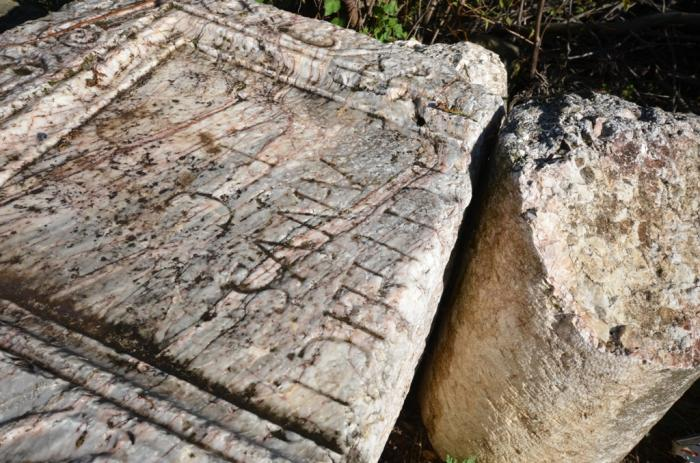
Archaeological findings near the Duboc Fortress

Duboc Fortress is a fortress in Duboc village in the Vushtrri municipality in Kosovo. It is situated above Ceçan, part of the Ciçavica mountain chain, approximately 11 km southwest of the city of Vushtrri.

== History ==
Duboc Fortress is a location of the Dardanic cultural group of the 8th and 9th centuries BCE Based on the findings of the cultural layers in this location, the discovered archaeological exhibits show about two different civilizations. Civilization A is in the lower layers underneath the civilization B, and the civilization B is in the upper layers.

Civilization B or the Duboc Fortress is located in the Mountain of the Town, (alb. "Mali i Gjytetit") from the north-east to the west. The length of the wall of the Duboc fortress is 900 meters, with the width of 2–4 meters, the height it is not known. The town of Duboc had two pairs of doors facing each other. In this fortress were found ceramics with ornaments of the Illyrian ethnographic fond, bricks, and marble objects with inscriptions.

From the Paleolithic period there were found chisels made of pigs teeth. From the Neolithic period were found different types of jewelry: earrings, and coins.

== See also ==
- Archaeology of Kosovo
- List of settlements in Illyria
