= Sanjak of Vučitrn =

Sanjak of the Ottoman Empire from 1459 to 1864

Sanjak of Vulçitrin
- Sanjak of Ottoman Empire
- 1459–1864
- Coat of arms
- Capital: Vulçitrin (Vushtrri, Vučitrn)
- History
  - Established: 1459
  - Disestablished: 1864
Preceded by	Succeeded by
Serbian Despotate	Sanjak of Pristina

The Sanjak of Vulçitrin (Turkish: Vulçitrin sancağı, Serbian: Вучитрнски санџак/Vučitrnski sandžak), also known as the Pristina Pashaluk (Serbian: Приштински пашалук/Prištinski pašaluk), was a sanjak (second-level administrative division) of the Ottoman Empire in Rumelia (the Balkans), in present-day Kosovo. It was named after its administrative center of Vulçitrin, now known as "Vushtrri" in Albanian and "Vučitrn" in Serbian.

== History ==
=== Early history ===
The town of Vučitrn was captured from the Serbian Despotate by the Ottomans in 1455, and it remained under control of the governor of Sanjak of Üsküp (Skopje) until the definite annexation of the Serbian Despotate in 1459. The first Ottoman records include the territory of the sanjak as Vilayet-i Vlk (Vilayet of Vuk), a reference to Vuk Branković. The town and sanjak was known as Vulçitrin in Turkish.

According to Ottoman defters of 1525–1561 the sanjak of Vulçitrin included the following towns: Vulçitrin, Pristina, Janjevo, Novo Brdo, Belasica, Belo Brdo, Koporići, Trepča and Donja Trepča.

The 1566–67 defter of the sanjak show that the c. 1000 villages of the region were mostly inhabited by Christians, with Muslims comprising forty-six households not in compact communities but spread in thirty villages. As in nearby Pristina the rate of conversion of Orthodox Slavs to Islam was low.

=== 17th century ===
Ottoman traveller Evliya Çelebi visited the capital of the sanjak in 1660 and observed that the population spoke "Albanian and Turkish, but not Bosnian". According to Ottoman sources, the sanjak was then inhabited by Albanians, Vlachs, Slavs, Turks, Gypsies and others, of Muslim, Orthodox and Catholic confessions. Among the Christians a Catholic community also existed as evidenced by a local landmark known as the "Latin cemetery" (Albanian: varrezat latine).

=== 18th century ===
In 1717, during the Austro-Turkish War, the Serb rayah revolted but were brutally suppressed.

=== 19th century ===
In 1864 during the administrative reforms of the era, it was demoted to a kaza of the newly established sanjak of Pristina.

== Administration ==
In 1459–1826 it was part of Rumelia Eyalet, except for a brief period after 1541 when it was included into newly established Budin Eyalet. It was also part of Temeşvar Eyalet briefly before returning to Rumelia Eyalet.

=== Governors ===
- Hussein Bey
- Malik Pasha (fl. 1807–1820s)
- Yashar Pasha (fl. 1830–1836)

== Economy ==
A group of mines on the Kopaonik mountain together with those in Novo Brdo and Janjevo belonged to this sanjak.
