= Radika =

River in Kosovo and North Macedonia

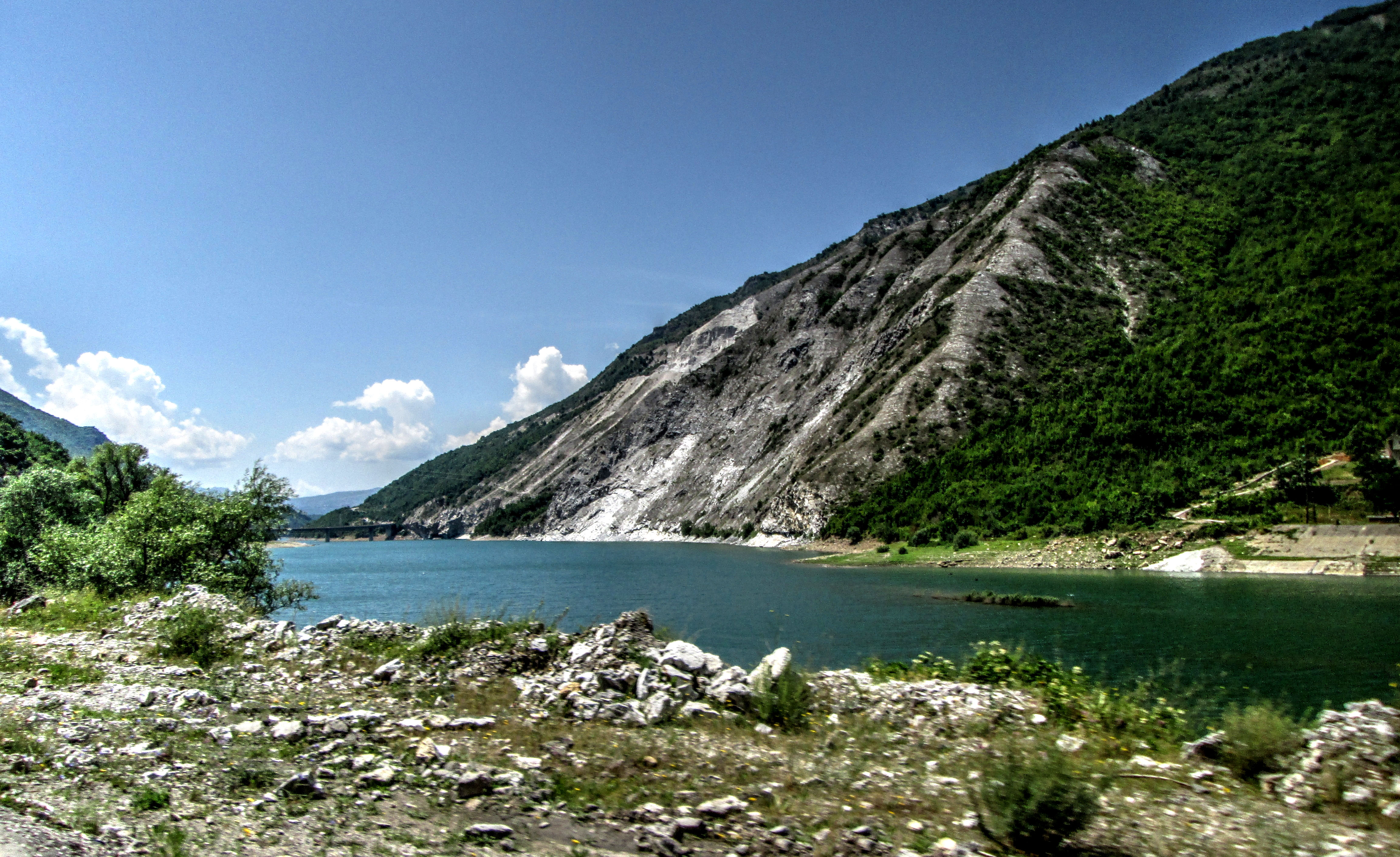
- Radika River
- Native name: Radikë (Albanian); Радика (Serbian); Радика (Macedonian)

Location
- Country: Kosovo, North Macedonia

Physical characteristics
- Source
  - location: Mount Vraca, Kosovo
- Mouth
  - location: Black Drin river, south of Debar, North Macedonia
  - coordinates: 41.494°N 20.515°E
- Length: 70 km (43 mi)
- Basin size: 665 km^{2} (257 sq mi)

Basin features
- Progression: Black Drin→ Drin→ Adriatic Sea

Radika (Albanian indefinite form: Radikë, Macedonian and Serbian Cyrillic: Радика) is a river in southern Kosovo and western North Macedonia, a 70 km (43 mi)-long right tributary to the Black Drin river.

== Geography ==
The Radika proper is 52 km (32 mi) long, but measured from the most distant source in its watershed, that of the Crni Kamen river, it is 70 km (43 mi) long. Overall, the Radika belongs to the Adriatic Sea drainage basin, draining an area of 665 km^{2} (257 sq mi) itself. It is not navigable. The Radika has huge possibilities for the hydroelectric power production, which is partially used in its upper course. Also, the river valley is the natural route for the major road in Western North Macedonia which connects the regions of Polog and Ohrid.

=== Origin ===
The Crni Kamen (Cyrillic: Црни Камен; Albanian: Guri i zi, meaning "black stone") springs out from the northern slopes of the Vraca mountain, the southern extension of the Šar Mountains, under the Golema Vraca peak (2,582 m or 8,471 ft). The 'Guri i zi' 'Crni Kamen' originally flows westward, through the Gora region, bends around the Vraca and sharply turns to the south and empties into the Kosovo-Macedonian border river Kafa Kadis (Albanian: Qafa e Kadisë; Macedonian: Ќафа Кадис/Ḱafa Kadis; Serbian: Ћафа Кадис/Ćafa Kadis).

The Kafa Kadis originates from the southern slopes of the Vraca mountain and northern slopes of the Mangulova Kula mountain, another extension of the Šar Mountains. It flows westwards, on the northern section of the mountain of Ničipurska planina (Brodec peak, still part of the Šar massif) and for several kilometers forms the Kosovo-Macedonian border. After it receives the Crni Kamen from the right and another stream coming from Kosovo, the Kafa Kadis turns south into the Macedonian proper again and from this point it is known as the Radika.

=== Upper Radika ===
Upper Radika is just 8 km (5 mi) long and due to the human managing of its course, it belongs to the Aegean Sea drainage basin, unlike the latter course of the Lower Radika which belongs to the Adriatic Sea drainage basin. It flows to the south between the mountains of Korab to the west and Ničipurska planina to the east. At the village of Volkovija, an artificial bifurcation is created, as the waters of the Upper Radika are conducted into the artificial Mavrovo Lake at the village of Mavrovi Anovi and from there, via the Mavrovo system of the hydroelectric power plants, into the Vardar river (in this bifurcational flow, it even receives a tributary, small stream of Beličica from the right).

=== Lower Radika ===
In the lower, 44 km (27 mi)-long section of the course, the Radika continues its general direction to the south. It carved a long and 1 km (0.62 mi) deep gorge between the mountains of Korab and Dešat on the west and Bistra (on the east). There are many interesting places along the Radika valley; including the villages of Velebrdo, Rostuša, Janče, Prisojnica, Skudrinje, the Saint Jovan Bigorski Monastery, the spa of Kosovratska banja (with sulphuric water, hot up to 49 °C or 120 °F) and the unique Alčija cave, formed in alabaster. Alabaster is abundant in the surrounding terrain and it has been extracted and treated for industrial and commercial use in the town of Debar.

After the gorge, the Radika receives its major tributary, the Valovica river from the right and flows on the northern slopes of the Stogovo mountain. After the villages of Dolno Kosovrasti, Dolno Melničani, Gorenci and Rajčica, the Radika empties into the Black Drin, just south of Debar. The river Black Drin is one of tributaries of River Drin, while the next is White Drin that originate from Kosova. Actually, the lowest section of the river is floodbed by the artificial lake Debar on the Black Drin, becoming one of lake's bays.

== Environment ==
=== Important Bird Area ===
The Radika catchment is characterised by mountains, cliffs and rocky gorges, with coniferous and deciduous woodlands and alpine pastures. The land is used mainly for cattle-grazing and forestry. It has been designated an Important Bird Area (IBA) by BirdLife International because it supports populations of Eurasian eagle-owls, golden eagles, yellow-billed choughs, wallcreepers, alpine accentors and white-winged snowfinches.
