= Mavrovo =

Mavrovo or Mavrova can refer to:

- Mavrovo (region), a region in North Macedonia
- Mavrovo National Park, a national park in North Macedonia
- Mavrovo Lake, a lake in North Macedonia
- Mavrovo and Rostuša Municipality, a municipality in North Macedonia
- Mavrovo, Mavrovo and Rostuša, a village in North Macedonia
- Mavrochori, also called Mavrovo, a village in Greece, near Kastoria
- Mavrovë, a village in Vlorë County, Albania
