= Konjushka =

Konjushka may refer to:

- Konjushka (lake), lake in the Sharr Mountains in Kosovo
- Konjushka (peak), peak in the Sharr Mountains between Kosovo and North Macedonia
