= Vraca =

Vraca may refer to:

- Vraca, Vratza or Vratsa, a city in northwestern Bulgaria.
- Big Vraca, a mountain in Kosovo and the Republic of Macedonia, part of the Šar Mountains.
- Small Vraca, a peak in Kosovo and the Republic of Macedonia, part of the Šar Mountains.
- Vraca Memorial Park, a park dedicated to the World War II victims in Sarajevo.
