= List of mountains in North Macedonia =

Topography of Republic of North Macedonia

The following is a list of mountains in North Macedonia.

North Macedonia is a predominantly mountainous country. The average elevation of the terrain is 850 meters. Approximately 80% of the country consists of hills and mountains. The mountains are divided into two basic groups: on the one hand in the North-West the Šar Mountains mountain range that continues to the West Vardar/Pelagonia mountain range in the South-West and South (contiguous with the Dinaric ranges). On the other hand, in the South-East the Osogovo-Belasica mountain chain (westernmost section of the Rila-Rhodope Mountains).
The Šar Mountains and West Vardar/Pelagonia mountain range is a continuation between the Dinaric Alps to the north and Pindus mountain ranges to the south, whereas the Osogovo-Belasica mountain chain is a continuation of the Rila-Rhodopes mountain massif.

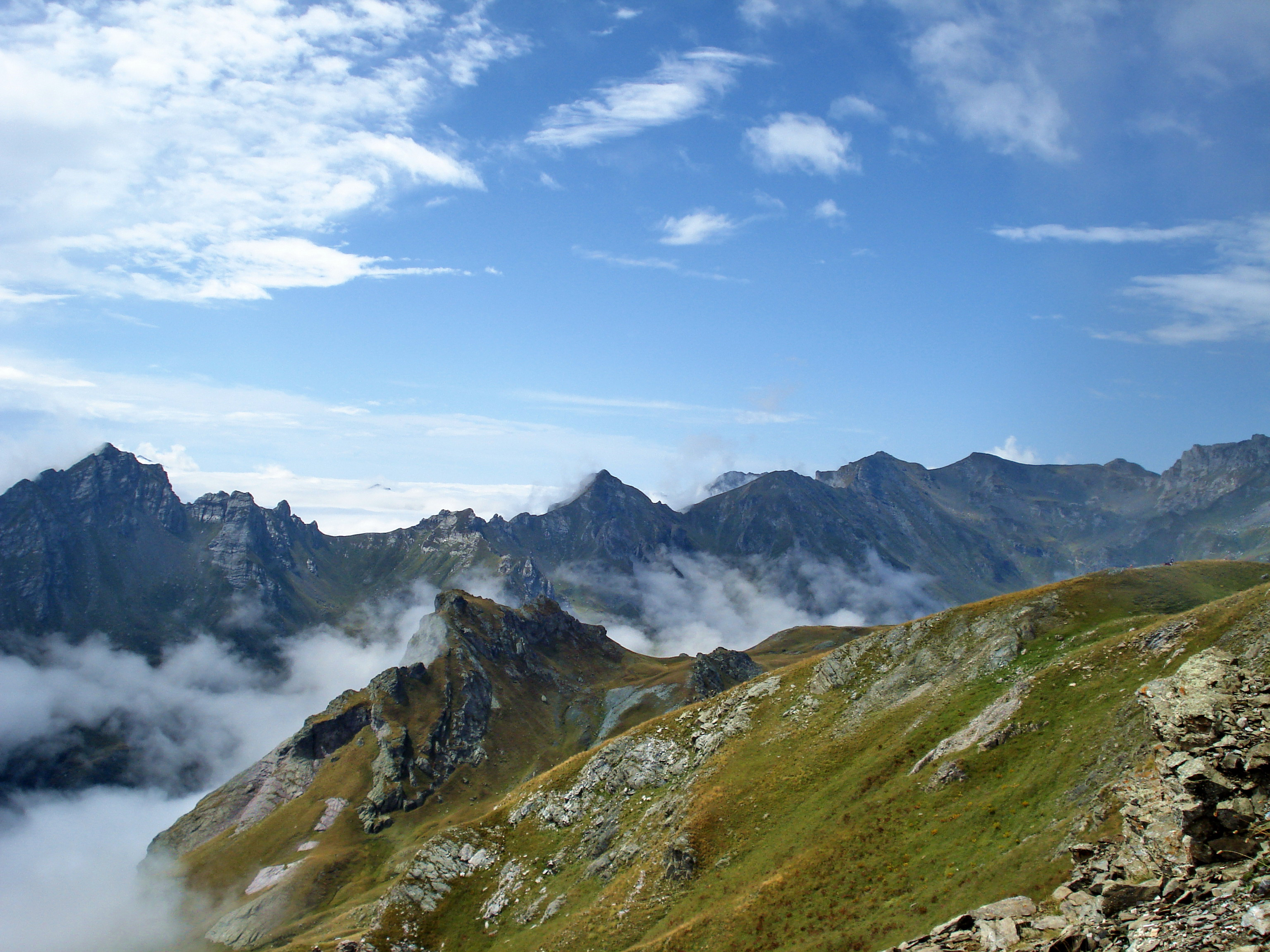
Landscape of Mount Korab

Šar mountain range:

- Šar Mountains
- Mount Korab
- Mount Bistra
- Stogovo
- Dešat
- Jablanica
- Galičica

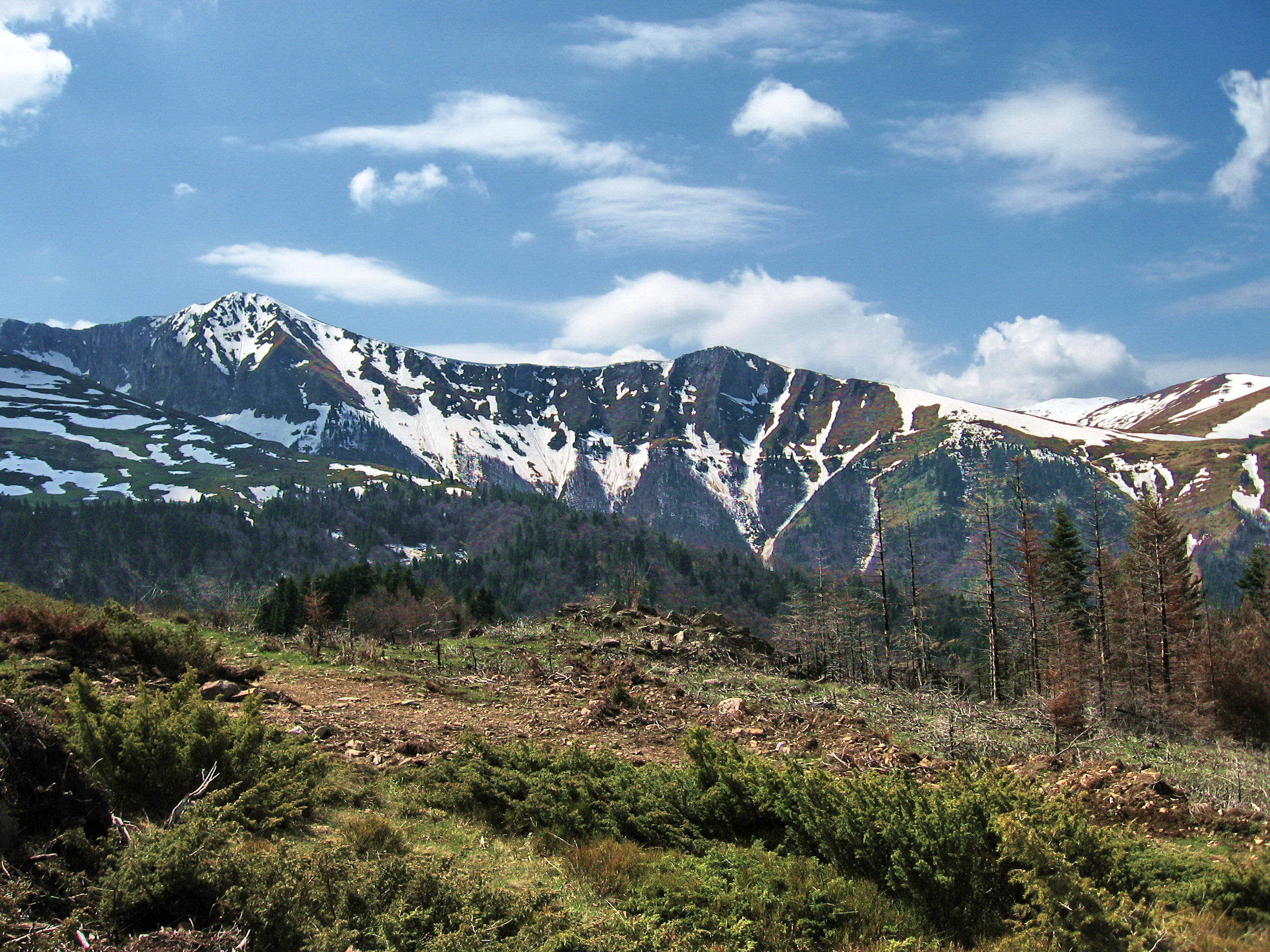
Karadzica, part of Jakupica mountain range

West Vardar/Pelagonia mountain range:

- Baba
- Jakupica
- Nidže
- Kožuf

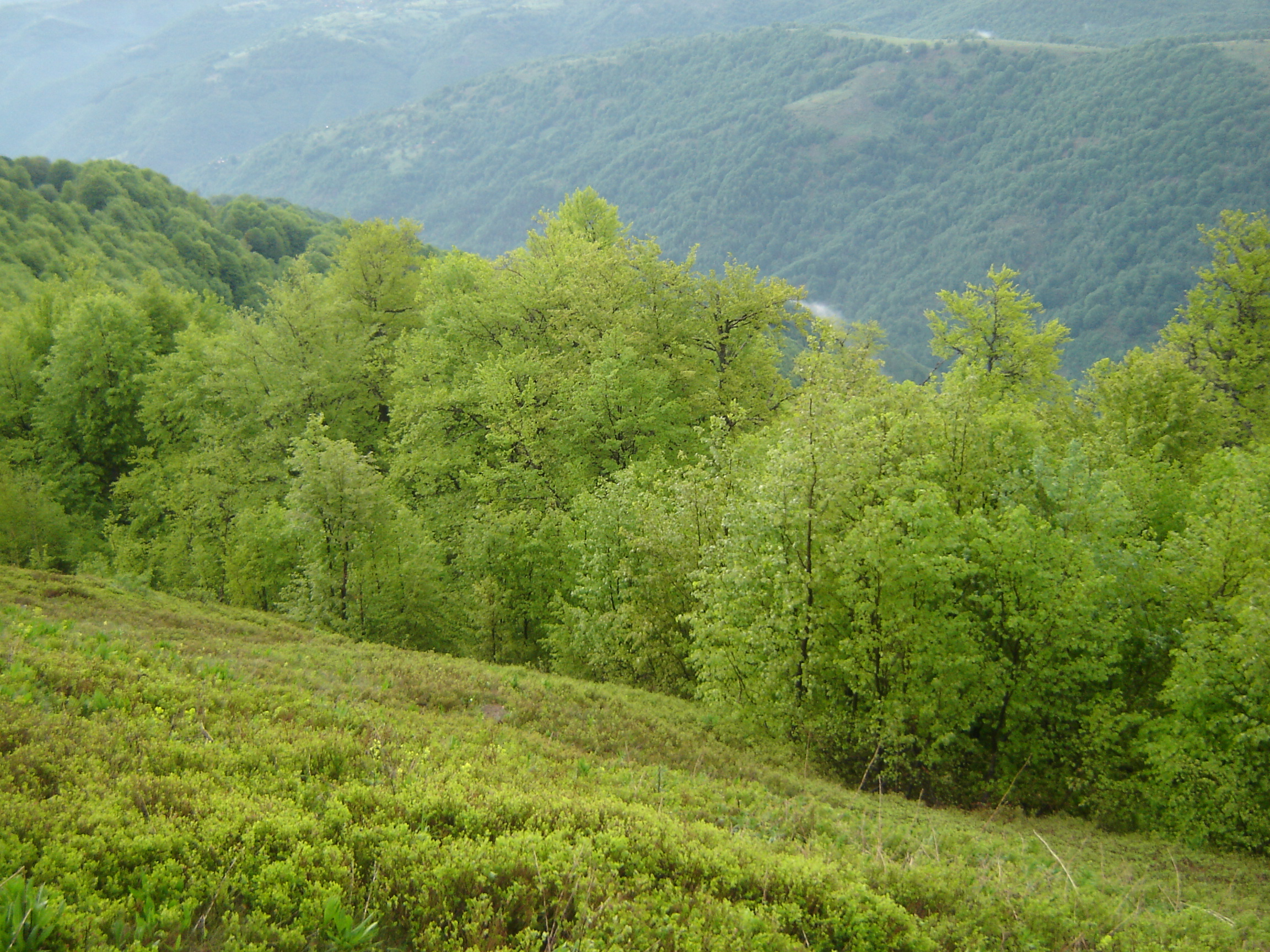
Spring aspect of Osogovo in Macedonia.

Osogovo-Belasica mountain range:

- Osogovo
- Belasica
- Vlahina
- Maleševo
- Plačkovica
- Ogražden

The mountains in the Osogovo-Belasica group are older mountains. They are spread across the eastern part of Macedonia. The mountains in the Šar Mountains group are younger mountains, situated in the western and central part of the country. They are divided in 3 subgroups: area around the Vardar river, area around Pelagonia valley and the area in the north-western part of the country.

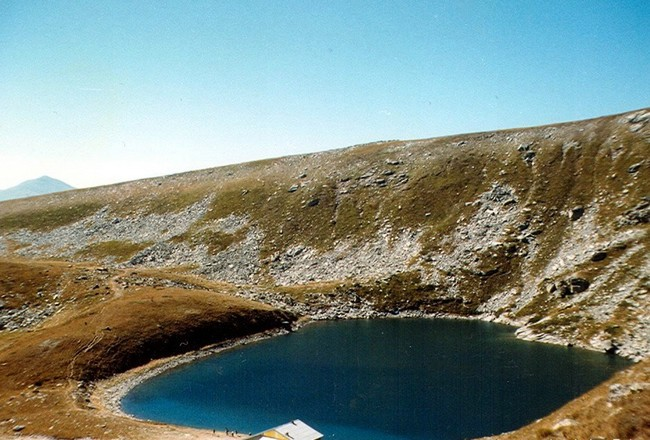
Big Lake (2218 m) – glacier lake on Pelister Mountain

There are three national parks protected by law in Macedonia: Pelister, Mavrovo and Galichica.

Following is a list of the most important Macedonian mountains:

- Mount Korab (2,764 m)
- Šar Mountains (2,747 m)
- Baba (2,601 m)
- Konjushka (2,571 m)
- Jakupica (2,540 m)
- Nidže (2,521 m)
- Dešat (2,373 m)
- Galičica (2,288 m)
- Stogovo (2,273 m)
- Jablanica (2,257 m)
- Osogovo (2,252 m)
- Kožuf (2,166 m)
- Bistra (2,163 m)
- Čeloica (2,062 m)
- Belasica (2,029 m)
- Kozjak (1,284 m)
- Plakenska planina
- Konečka planina
- Maleševo
- Plačkovica
- Buševa planina
- Babuna
- Ogražden
- Selečka planina
- Skopska Crna Gora
