= Ana Colovic Lesoska =

Macedonian environmental activist

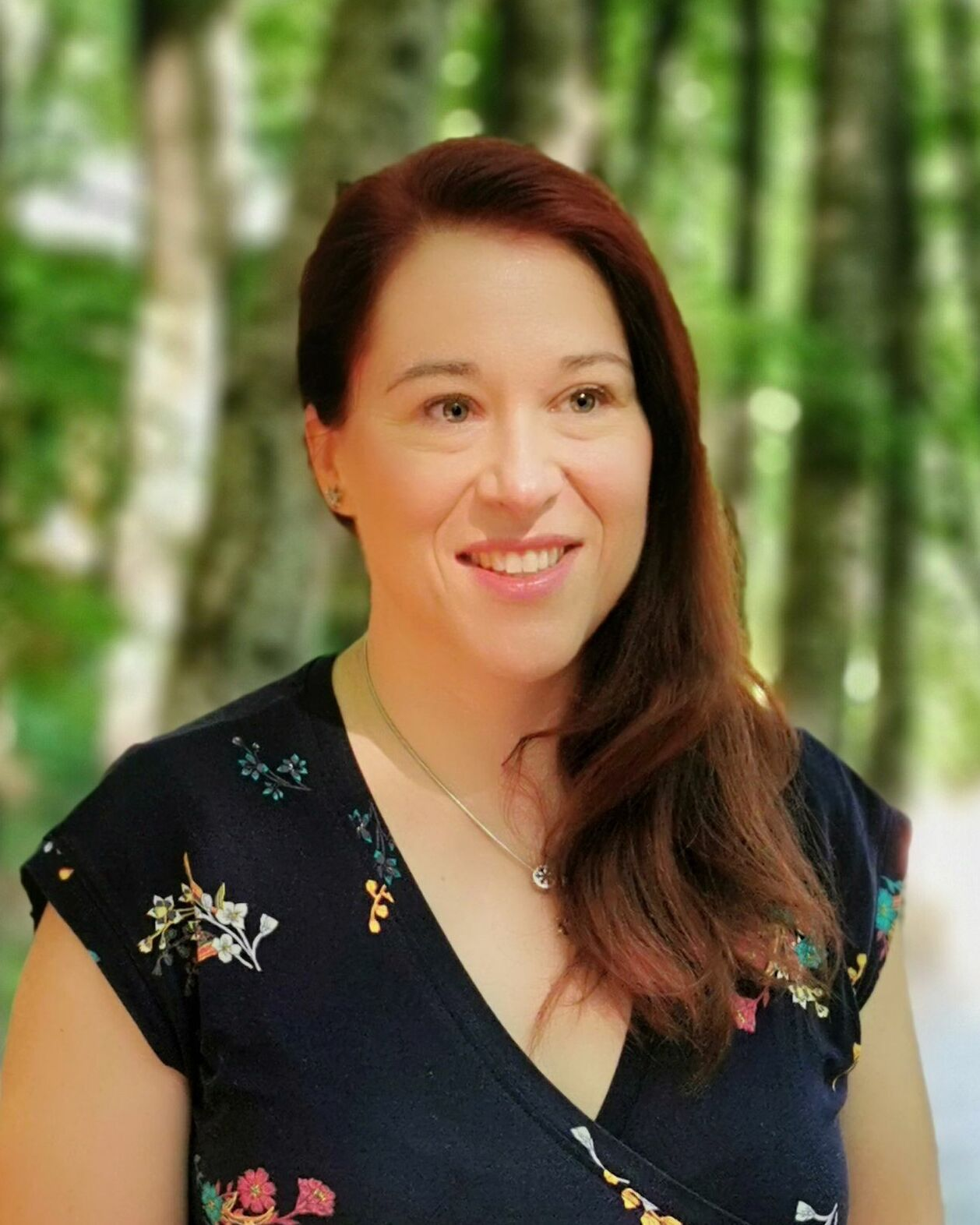
Ana Čolović Lešoska (2022)

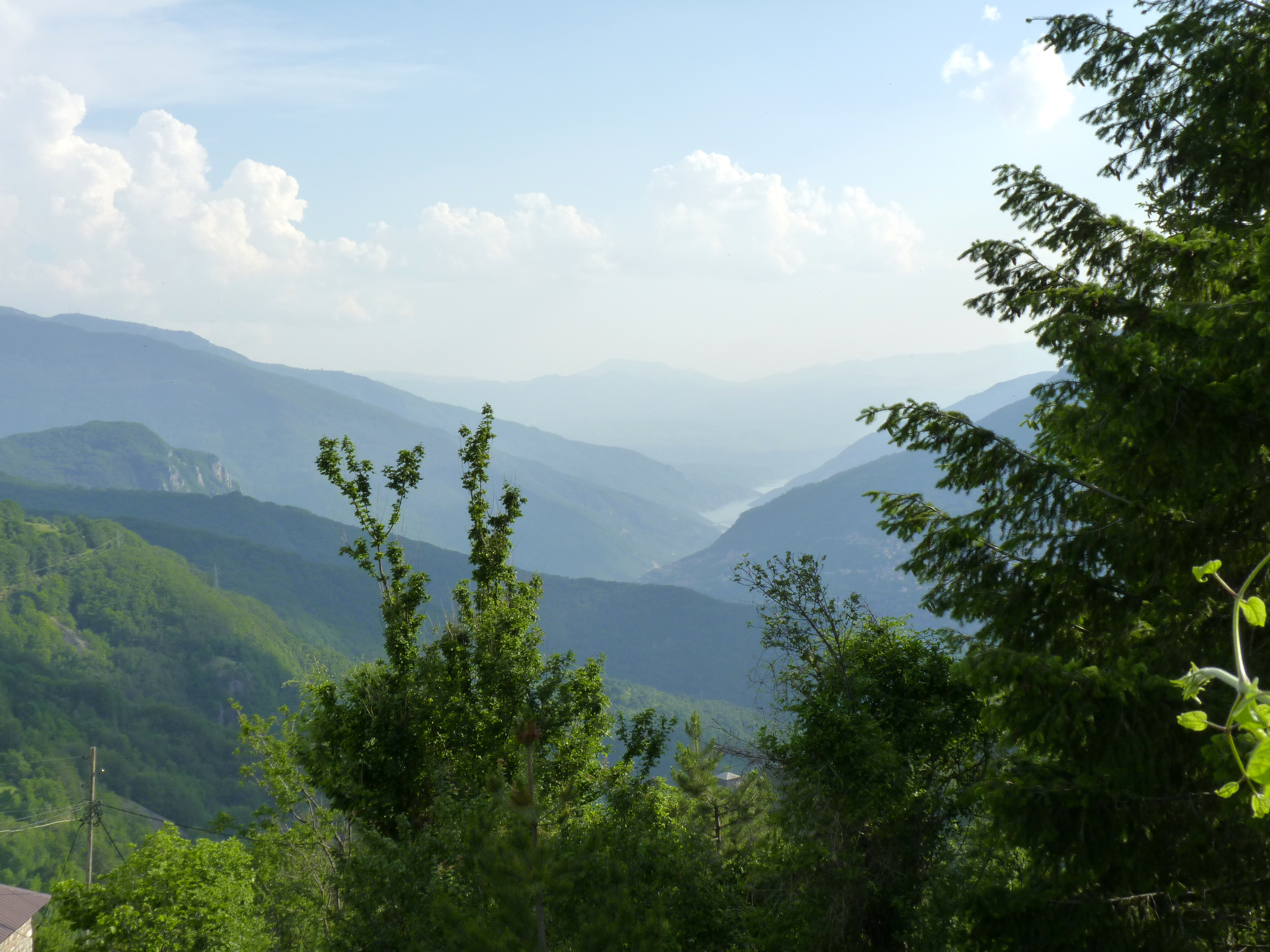
Mavrovo National Park

Ana Čolović Lešoska (born 1979) is a Macedonian biologist who since 2011 has campaigned against the construction of dams for hydroelectric power production in the Mavrovo National Park in order to safeguard threatened species, including the Balkan lynx. This led to the withdrawal of loans from the World Bank and the European Bank for Reconstruction and Development (EBRD), convincing the Government of North Macedonia to suspend further work on dams in the national park. In recognition of her efforts, in April 2019 she was one of six environmentalists to be awarded the Goldman Environmental Prize.

Colovic Lesoska, a biologist, heard about plans to create hydroelectric power facilities in Mavrovo in 2010. They included the 33m-high Boškov Most dam and the 70m-high Lukovo Pole dam. As executive director of Eko-svest, a Macedonian environmental research centre, in collaboration with other NGOs and activists, she launched the "Save Mavrovo" campaign. In November 2011, she filed a complaint with the ERBD, explaining that they had approved a loan for the Boškov Most project without conducting the required biodiversity assessment. She encouraged the ambassadors of countries with representatives on the EBRD board to push for an end to the funding. A petition she launched urging the government, the ERBD and the World Bank to bring the projects to a close was supported by almost 100,000 signatures.

In 2013, she filed a complaint with the Berne Convention on the Conservation of European Wildlife and Natural Habitats, explaining that the Boškov Most hydropower project "could have a decisive negative impact on the lynx". In December 2015, the Berne Convention ordered the ERBD and the World Bank to suspend financing as the project could have "a decisive negative impact on the lynx". The World Bank immediately withdrew funding and the following May, a court decision to annul the environmental permit for the Boškov Most project. In January 2017, the EBRD cancelled financing.

In recognition of these achievements, in April 2019 Ana Colovic Lesoska was awarded the Goldman Environmental Prize. It was the first time the prize had been awarded to North Macedonia.
