= Velebrdo =

Velebrdo Велебрдо
- Village
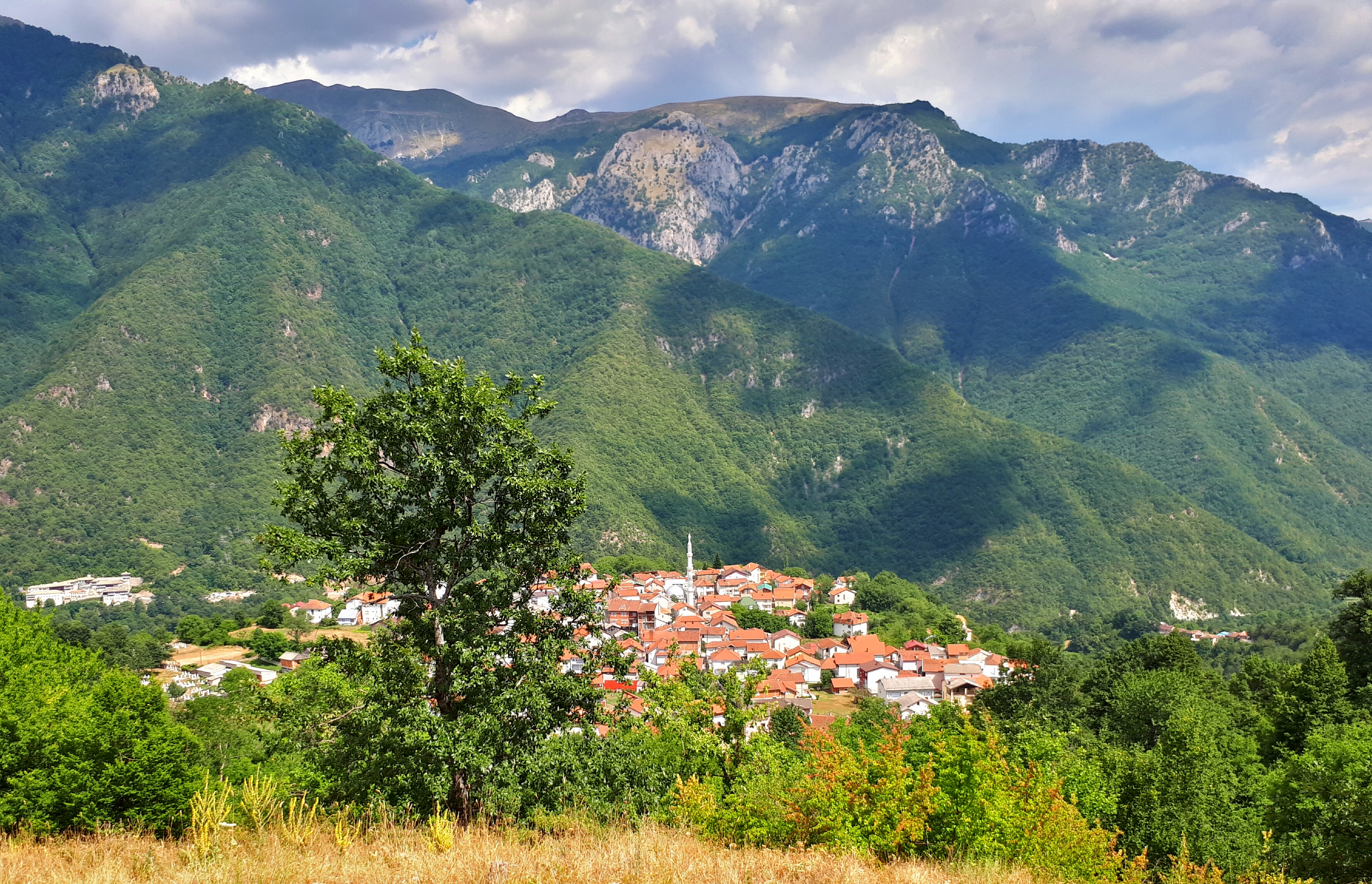
- Panoramic view of the village

- Location within North Macedonia
- Coordinates: 41°37′N 20°36′E
- Country: North Macedonia
- Region: Polog
- Municipality: Mavrovo and Rostuša
- Elevation: 850 m (2,790 ft)

Population (2002)
  - Total: 750
- Time zone: UTC+1 (CET)
  - Summer (DST): UTC+2 (CEST)
- Postal code: 1254
- Car plates: GV

Velebrdo (Macedonian: Велебрдо) is a village in the municipality of Mavrovo and Rostuša, North Macedonia. Situated on the slopes of the Dešat mountain, 2 km from the River Radika. The village has a relatively flat terrain, placed on a hill (брдо), giving it a unique position with extensive views of the surrounding mountains and the Radika valley.

== Origin of the name ==
The village is believed to have been named after its founder, called Vele.

== Demographics ==
Velebrdo has traditionally been inhabited by a Torbeš and Orthodox Macedonian population.

According to the 2002 census, the village had a total of 750 inhabitants. The ethnic composition was as follows:

- Macedonians – 609
- Turks – 132
- Albanians – 6
- Others – 3
