= Boškov Most Hydro Power Plant =

- Interactive map of Boškov Most Hydro Power Plant
- Country: North Macedonia
- Location: Near Debar, Mavrovo and Rostuša Municipality
- Coordinates: 41°33′55″N 20°42′45″E
- Purpose: Power
- Status: Proposed
- Construction cost: €144 million
- Operator: Elektrani na Severna Makedonija (ESM)

Dam and spillways
- Type of dam: Rock-filled embankment dam
- Impounds: Mala Reka river
- Height (foundation): 46 m
- Height (thalweg): 32 m
- Dam volume: 160.000 m^{3}

Reservoir
- Creates: Tresonče reservoir
- Total capacity: 2 million m^{3}
- Active capacity: 0.55 million m^{3}
- Normal elevation: 990 m

Power Station
- Coordinates: 41°32′59″N 20°37′02″E
- Type: Derivation
- Turbines: 2 x 35.75 MW Francis turbine
- Installed capacity: 71.5 MW
- Annual generation: 117 GWh (est.)

Boškov Most Hydro Power Plant, referred to as Boškov Most HPP, is a derivation plant planned to be built in Mala Reka valley, in the southernmost part of the Mavrovo National Park, in North Macedonia. It will have a total capacity of 71,5 MW. Construction is expected to last 4 years.

The project raises several environmental concerns, including threats on the survival of the Balkan lynx.

== Project details ==
The project is being developed by Elektrani na Severna Makedonija (ESM), a 100% state owned electric power utility of North Macedonia responsible for mining and power generation. As of 2020, the public company operates 554 MW of hydropower capacity, representing 40% of its total installed power generation capacity.

Boškov Most HPP is intended to utilise the hydro power potential of Mala Reka river and 6 of its tributaries. The facility will include a rock-filled embankment dam and its accumulation reservoir near the village of Tresonče, and a 71.5 MW power station located lower in the valley, near Mogorče. Water will be conveyed from the first to the latter by a 8,750 m long and 3.3 m diameter underground penstock, and from six smaller water intakes on Mala Reka tributaries via supply canals totalling 10.7 km.

It will generate an estimated 117 GWh of power per year, according to the preliminary design studies.

The total cost of the project was estimated €144 million as of 2019, rising from €84 million in 2011, and €107 million in 2014.

== History ==
Plans to build the Boškov Most HPP date back to 1983 (as a substantially smaller 45 MW facility) but it was postponed several times due to financial problems. The project under its current design started in 2010. In November 2011, the European Bank for Reconstruction and Development (EBRD) signed on loaning a country €65 million for the construction of the project. The rest is to be provided by the AD Elektrani na Severna Makedonija (ESM). The EBRD cancelled its loan in January 2017, after a seven-year environmental activism campaign again the project, led by biologist Ana Colovic Lesoska.

== Importance for the energy sector of North Macedonia ==
As of 2020, only 26.6% of technically usable hydropower potential in North Macedonia has been developed, which remains far under the European average of ~50%.

Unfavourable energy mix, strong dependence on energy import, obsolete energy system and inefficiency in energy production and use are the main problems of the energy sector of North Macedonia. North Macedonia imports roughly a quarter of its annual electricity needs. Domestic energy production is based mainly on the low-quality domestic lignite, biomass and hydro.

The Boškov Most HPP aimed support North Macedonia's drive to improve the security and quality of its energy supplies, as well as promote renewable sources of energy generation. Once operational, the plant enabled the nation to reduce electricity imports and, in addition decrease the carbon intensity of North Macedonia's generation sector. It also supports North Macedonia to achieve its widely accepted objective of 20% energy production from renewable sources.

Boškov Most HPP is conceived as a peaking power plant, operating near rated capacity around 5 hours daily during peak demand.

== Controversial issues ==
=== Environmental impact ===
The Mavrovo National Park is one of the oldest national parks in Europe, famous for its pristine nature. The park hosts more than 1,000 different plant species. Trout species, wolves, bears and otters are an important part of the ecosystem. The park is also a centre of the remaining population of the Balkan Lynx, an endangered subspecies of the Eurasian Lynx. The territory where it moves is thus a critical habitat and represents an area where measures for protection and preservation of this species should be undertaken. Putting any additional stress on this source population may lead to the extinction of the species.

Boškov HPP is designed to produce peak energy which means that the water from Mala Reka river and its tributaries will be diverted into a reservoir and on demand released once a day. Aside from the fact that the entire valley will suffer from the diversion of the majority of its natural water supplies, it will also result in daily flushes, which have enormous negative impacts on biodiversity and species populations in the river sections below the HPP.

=== Legal issues ===
The Environmental impact assessment prepared for the project is lacking significant information vital for the precise and objective evaluation of the impact of the project on the environment, specifically data on the mammals in the project area and complete absence of the Balkan lynx from the study.

The project is also not in accordance with Law on Nature protection specifically with Article 74, which does not envisage the use of natural resources for energy as a part of national park management and Article 75 which lists the prohibited activities in the national park. Furthermore, the project is not in accordance with the following international conventions signed and ratified by the government of North Macedonia: Bern Convention, Bonn Convention and Convention on Biodiversity.

=== Funding plan cancellation ===
After over five years of campaigns against the Boskov Most project, CEE Bankwatch, along with its member groups, Macedonian center for environmental research and information, Eko-svest, and Macedonian environmental lawyer association, Front 21/42, finally welcomed the cancellation of the project. In 2015, just few days after the Berne Convention decision on Mavrovo, the World Bank withdrew its funds from the Lukovo Pole project, thus preventing the project from being realised. It took the EBRD another year to cancel its EUR 65 million loan for Boškov Most as well, stating that it fully respects Bern Convention’s recommendation and believes that the project should be suspended.
