= Konjushka (lake) =

Lake in Kosovo

Konjushka Lake
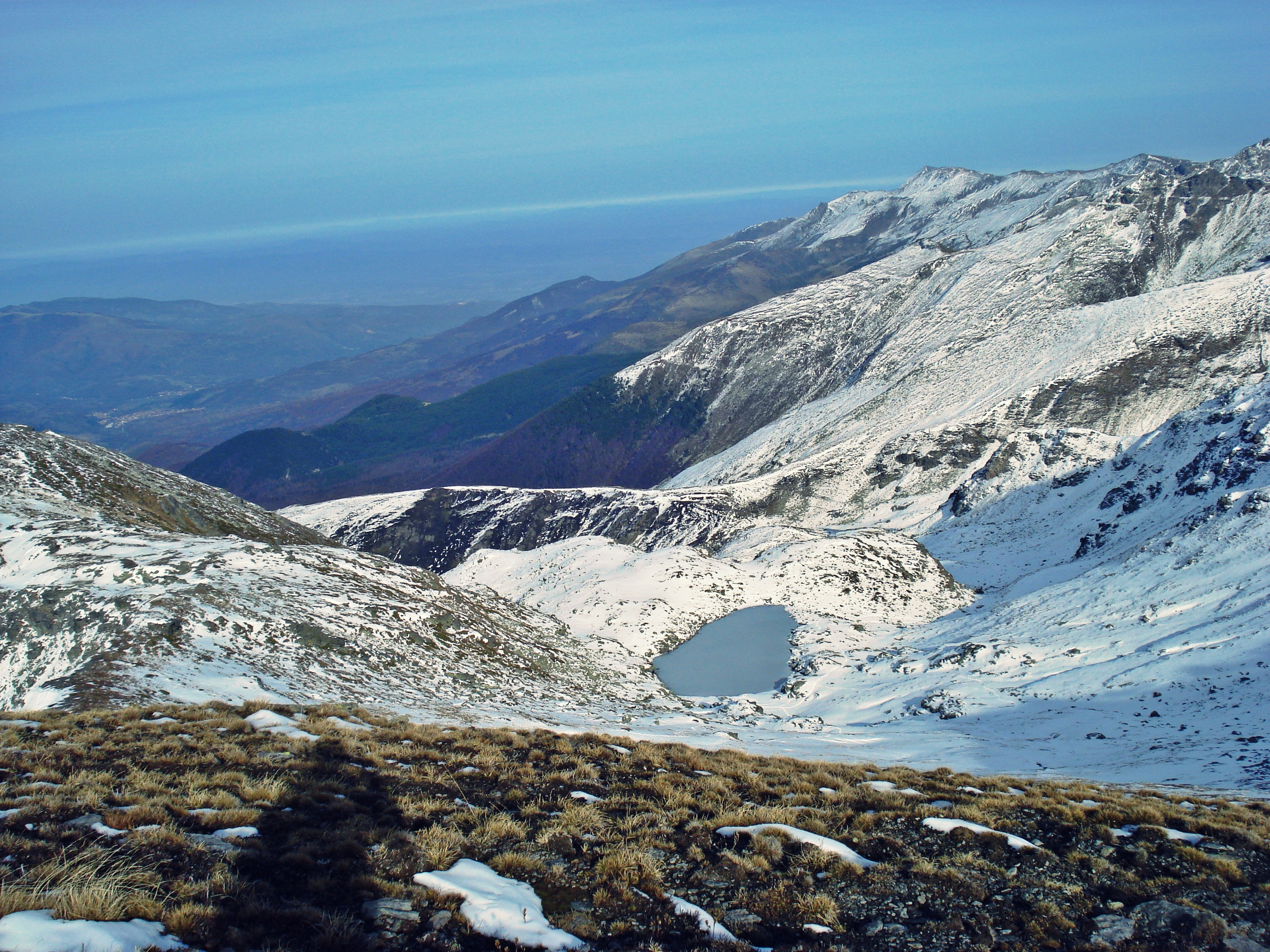
- View of the Konjushka Lake

- Location within Kosovo
- Interactive map of Konjushka Lake
- Location: Prizren, Kosovo
- Coordinates: 42.1406°N 20.9494°E
- Type: Alpine lake
- Primary outflows: left tributary of Lumbardhi i Prizrenit
- Basin countries: Kosovo
- Max. length: 100 m (330 ft)
- Max. width: 70 m (230 ft)
- Average depth: 1 m (3.3 ft)
- Surface elevation: 2,410 m (7,910 ft)
- Islands: None

Konjushka Lake (Albanian: Liqeni i Konjushkës) is an alpine lake in the Sharr Mountains in Kosovo. It is the highest lake in Kosovo and in the Sharr Mountains at around 2,410 m (7,910 ft).

== Overview ==
The lake is located in south-eastern Kosovo in the Sharr Mountains and it lies at the foot of the peak carrying the same name, Konjushka peak. The lake is approximately 100 m (330 ft) long, 70 m (230 ft) wide, and 1 m (3 ft 3 in) deep. A hunting lodge was built in the 1970s to accommodate those hunting wild goats.

In 2025, the German ambassador in Kosovo, Jorn Rohde, together with the Albanian alpinist Uta Ibrahimi, climbed the peak in an initiative of him called "Ecje me Ambasadorin".

== Etymology ==
The name comes from the Albanian for "close to the summit". Yugoslavian maps used the Serbian language name, Gornje Jezero. The Serbian name comes from its being the highest lake in the mountain range, and like Gornja Mahalla near what is now Gornje Selo near Prizren, the area was once used for pasture by local Serbs.

== Gallery ==
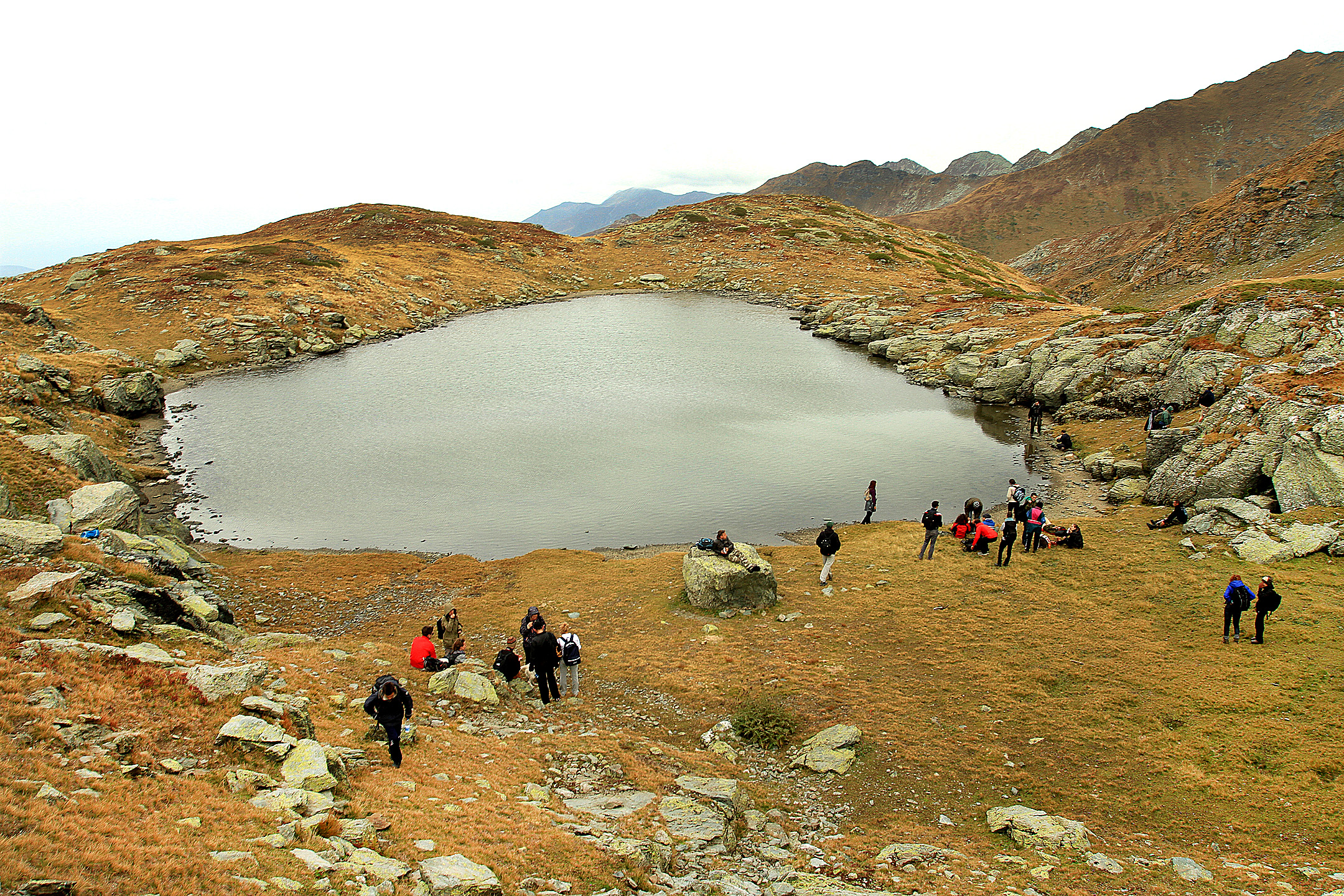
Hikers near the lake

== See also ==
- List of lakes of Kosovo
