= Mavrovo (region) =

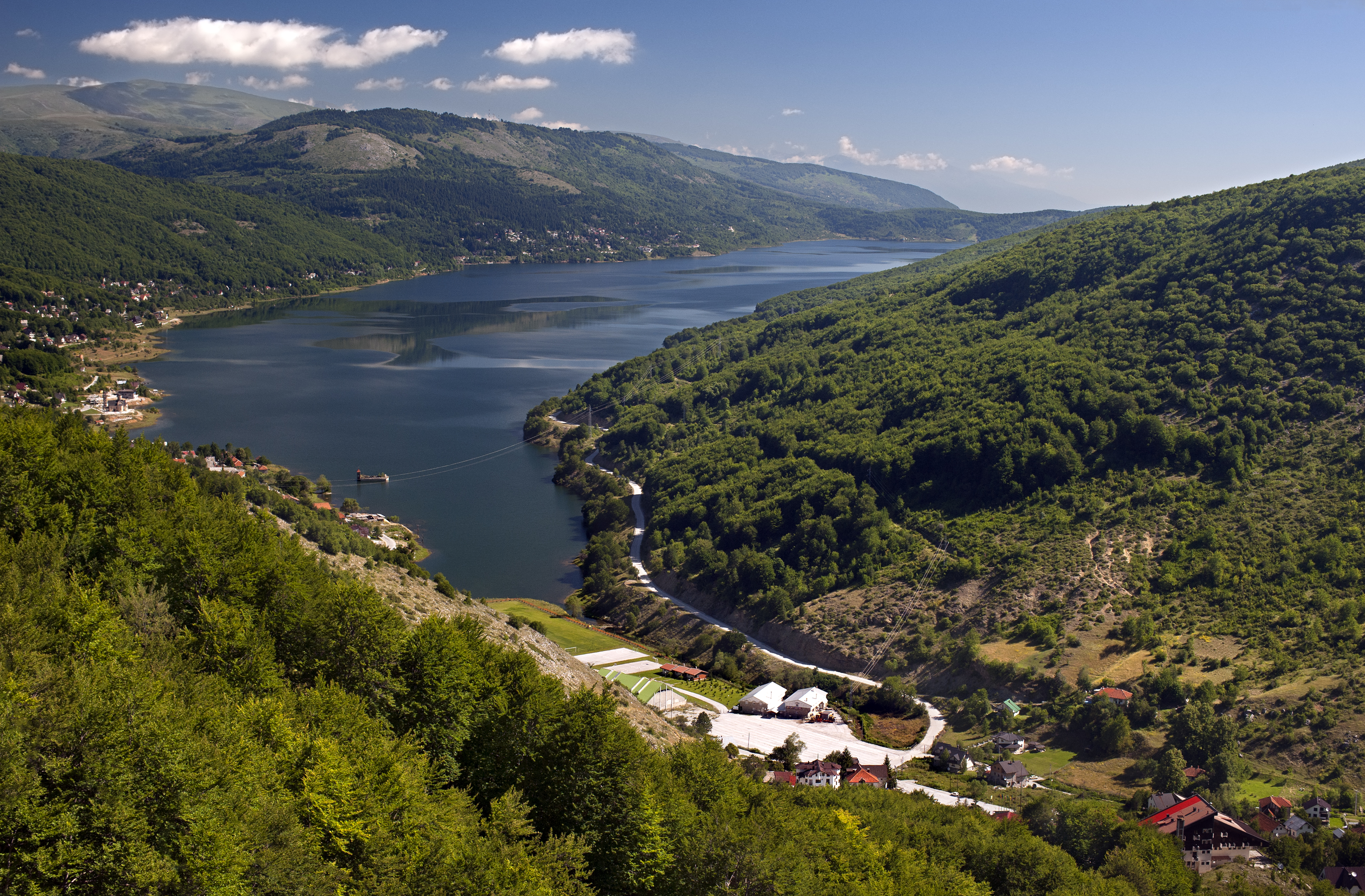
Panoramic image of Mavrovo valley with Lake Mavrovo in Summer

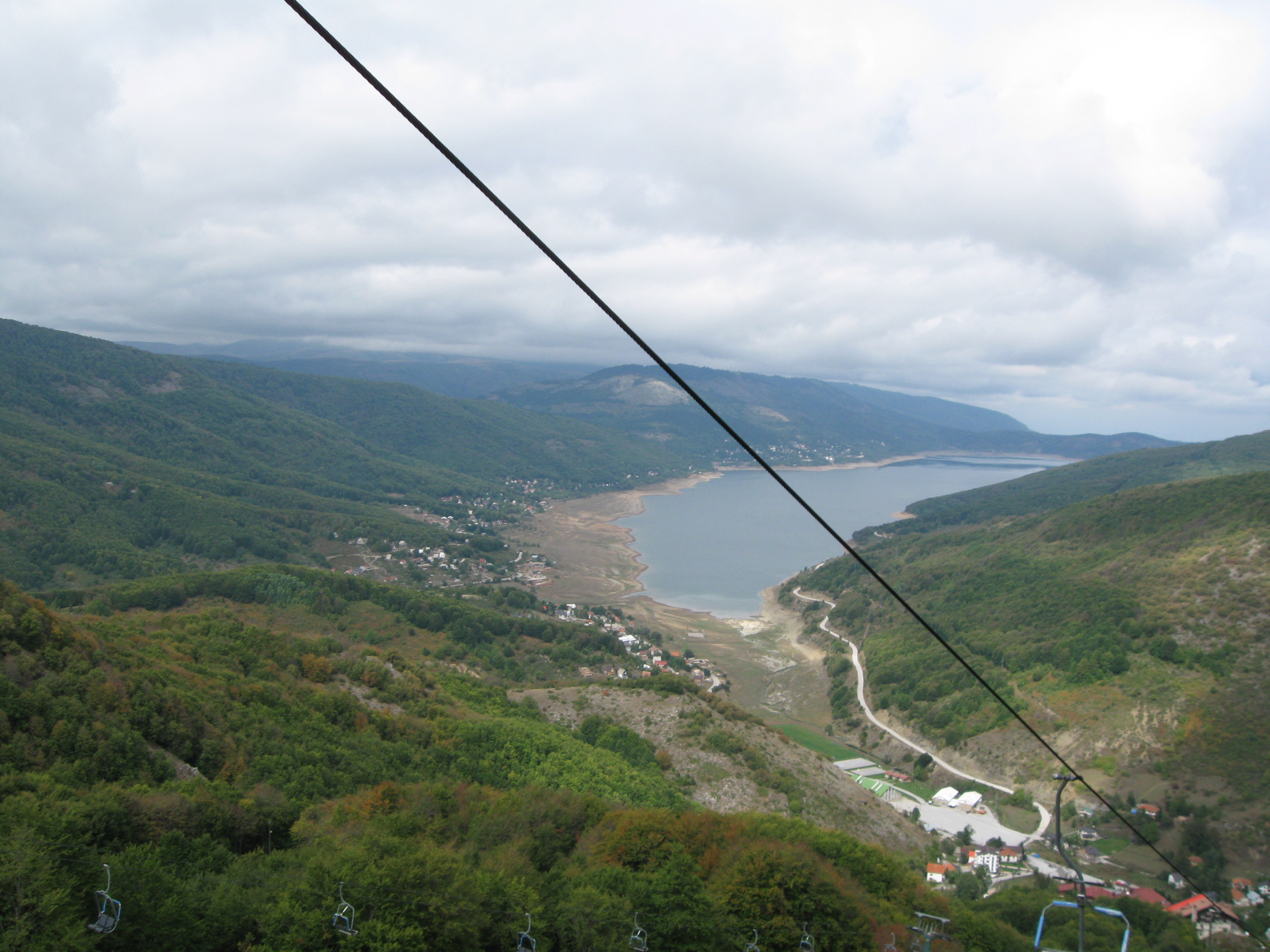
View of Mavrovo Lake from the chairlift in Autumn

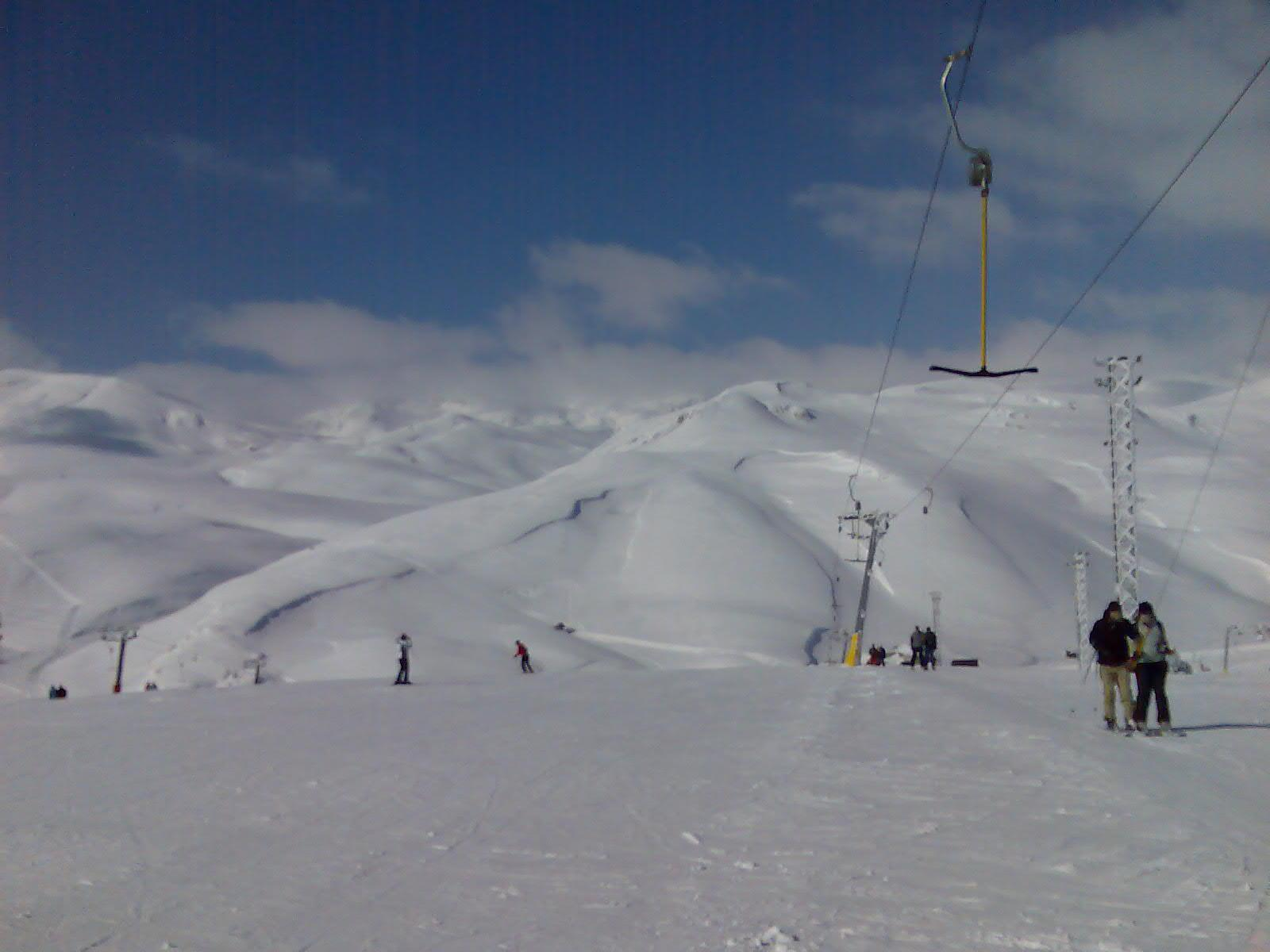
Mavrovo ski center in winter

Mavrovo (Macedonian: Маврово, pronounced [ˈmavrɔvɔ]; or Mavrovo Valley, Macedonian: Мавровска Котлина, romanized: Mavrovska Kotlina), near Gostivar is a valley region in the northwest of North Macedonia. It is home to Mavrovo National Park and a winter sports center. Some of the villages and smaller hamlets include: Mavrovo, Nikiforovo, Leunovo, and Mavrovi Anovi. This micro region is named Mavrovo after the most populated settlement in the region, the village of Mavrovo.

The region's location at Bistra mountain and Mavrovo Lake have helped it grow into a year-round tourist center. Mavrovo is the most popular ski center in North Macedonia, Ski center „Mavrovo“.

The Mavrovo Lake lies at an altitude of 1220 m. It is 12 km long, 3 km wide and covers an area of 13.3 square kilometers. The coast is 24 km long. The deepest measured spot of the lake is 48 m deep.
