= Lukovo Pole hydro power project =

The Lukovo Pole hydro power project is a plan to construct a 20km channel, a 70m high dam and a small hydroelectric power project with an installed capacity of 5 MW on Črn Kamen River downstream of Lukovo Pole. The projected site is located within the Mavrovo National Park where there is strong opposition to any unnecessary interference with the natural landscape and ecosystem.

== General information ==
The Lukovo Pole Hydroelectric Power Plant is a planned project. It is intended to be located 100km southwest of Skopje, North Macedonia, near to the country's western border with Albania, in the Mavrovo National Park area of the Korab mountain range. The plan envisages the construction of a covered feeder channel (approximately 20km long) at an altitude of 1,500m. This will channel the flow of several tributaries of the Radika river into a reservoir through a pipe system. In this way, it will provide additional flow of water to existing hydroelectric power plants. The reservoir will be supported by a 71m-high dam at Lukovo Pole; it will have a storage capacity of about 39 million cubic meters. The slopes of the reservoir will have moderate to low inclination, meaning that instability is unlikely. Approximately 3.5km downhill from the dam, a small hydroelectric power plant will be constructed with an installed capacity of 5 megawatts (MW). The preliminary design for this power plant envisions two Francis turbines, each with an installed capacity of 2.5 MW.

== Ownership and financing ==
The project will be implemented by Elektrani na Severna Makedonija (ESM), a state-owned electric utility. This company was formed in 2005 and currently carries out mining operations in four different coal mines. Its current maximum power generation capacity is 1,329 MW, 60% of which comes from coal-fired plants and 40% from existing hydroelectric power plants.

The total cost of this project is estimated to be US$83 million, of which US$70 million will be provided by a loan from the World Bank.

== Controversial issues ==
The Mavrovo National Park is an area which contains diverse fauna and flora and a relatively untouched landscape. The area around the project site has been identified as a potential World Heritage Site by an international delegation of expects: it is characterized by the "richest and most beautiful parts of the national park," with a large amount of plant biodiversity which makes it a valuable site for researchers specialising in Europe´s plant species. According to PlantLife, this project would affect 17 threatened plant species, including the endemic fritillary Fritillaria, the macedonica and the Narthecium scardicum. In order to facilitate the implementation of this project, the area specifically intended for the construction work was downgraded from a strictly prohibited area to an area with sustainable use: this is the lowest possible level of protection, and allows construction work to take place on the site.

Preliminary assessments of the project indicate that the proposed project would only have a limited impact on the amount of water diverted from the Radika River. However, several NGOs claim that the loss of water will be a problem for sustaining life in the park.

This project will require extensive hydrological engineering in a high-altitude valley with unfavorable geological conditions. These geological problems include landslides, leaking materials and the permanent presence of water. Therefore, substantial adjustments will be needed in order to complete the construction work successfully. Large-scale construction of canals and service roads might well cause a substantial disturbance to the Balkan lynx, which is a subspecies of the Eurasian lynx.

In addition, it has been alleged that this project is in breach of international law: it violates the Berne Convention on the Conservation of European Wildlife and Natural Habitats, the Bonn convention and the Convention on Biological diversity, all of which have been ratified by North Macedonia.
