= Mavrovo Lake =

Reservoir in North Macedonia

Mavrovo
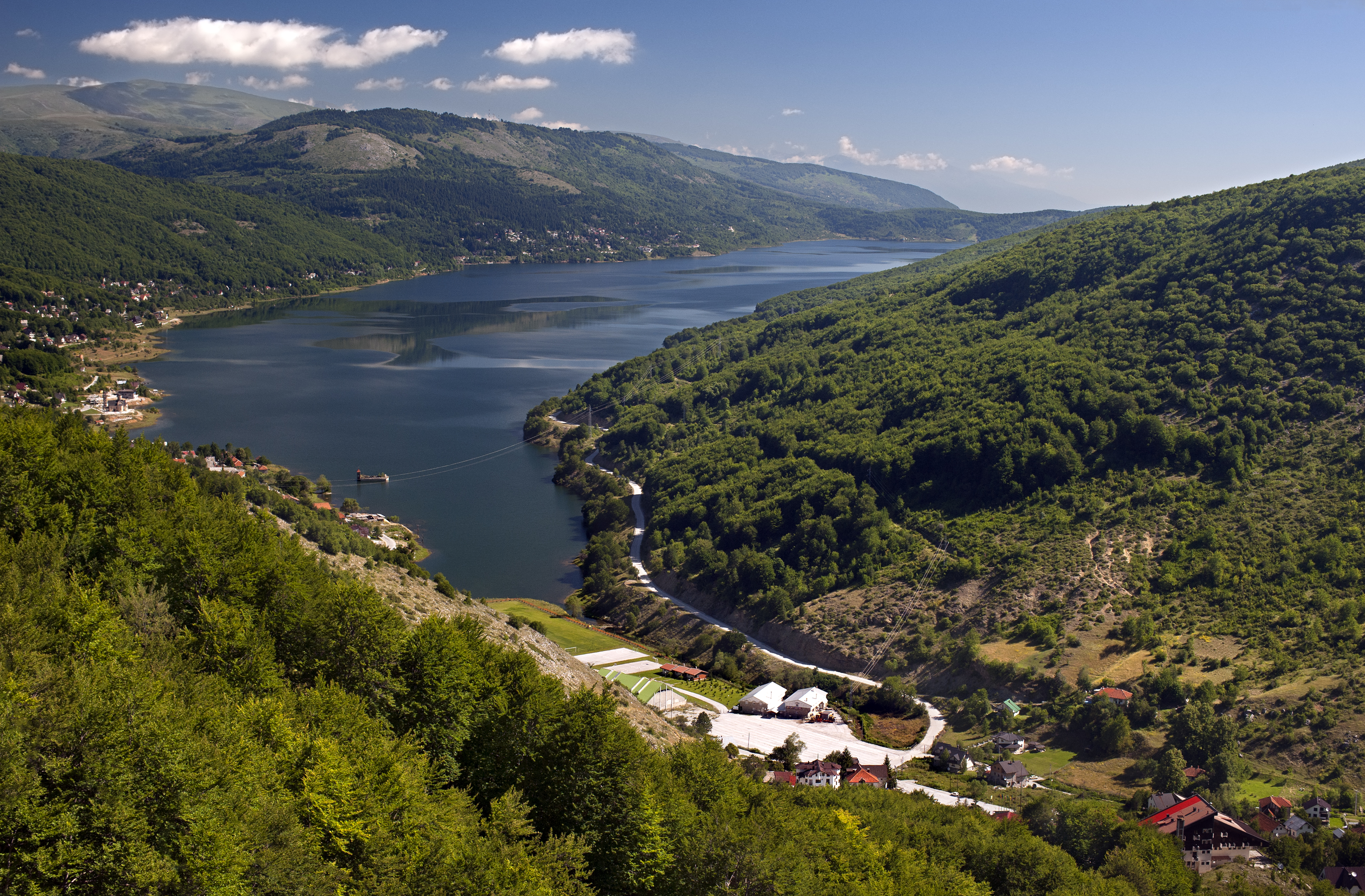

- Location within North Macedonia
- Interactive map of Mavrovo
- Location: Mavrovo region
- Coordinates: 41°41′N 20°45′E
- Type: reservoir
- Primary inflows: Mavrova
- Primary outflows: Mavrova
- Basin countries: Republic of North Macedonia
- Max. length: 10 km (6.2 mi)
- Max. width: 5 km (3.1 mi)
- Surface area: 1,370 ha (3,400 acres)
- Max. depth: 50 m (160 ft)
- Water volume: 357 hm^{3} (289,000 acre⋅ft)

Mavrovo Lake (Macedonian: Мавровско Езеро, romanized: Mavrovsko ezero) is situated in the Mavrovo region, in the Mavrovo and Rostuša municipality, Gostivar in the Republic of North Macedonia, less than 100 km from Skopje. It is an important tourist destination, being frequented for recreational activities such as swimming, boating and trout fishing during the summer; a distinctive building in the lake is the half-submerged church of Saint Nicholas. Since 1952 it is part of the Mavrovo National Park. With its surface of 13.7 km^{2} (3,400 acres), is one of the most extensive artificial lakes of the country.

The lake is surrounded by the Šar Mountains on the North and the Bistra Mountains on the South, both exceeding heights of 2500 m.

== Gallery ==
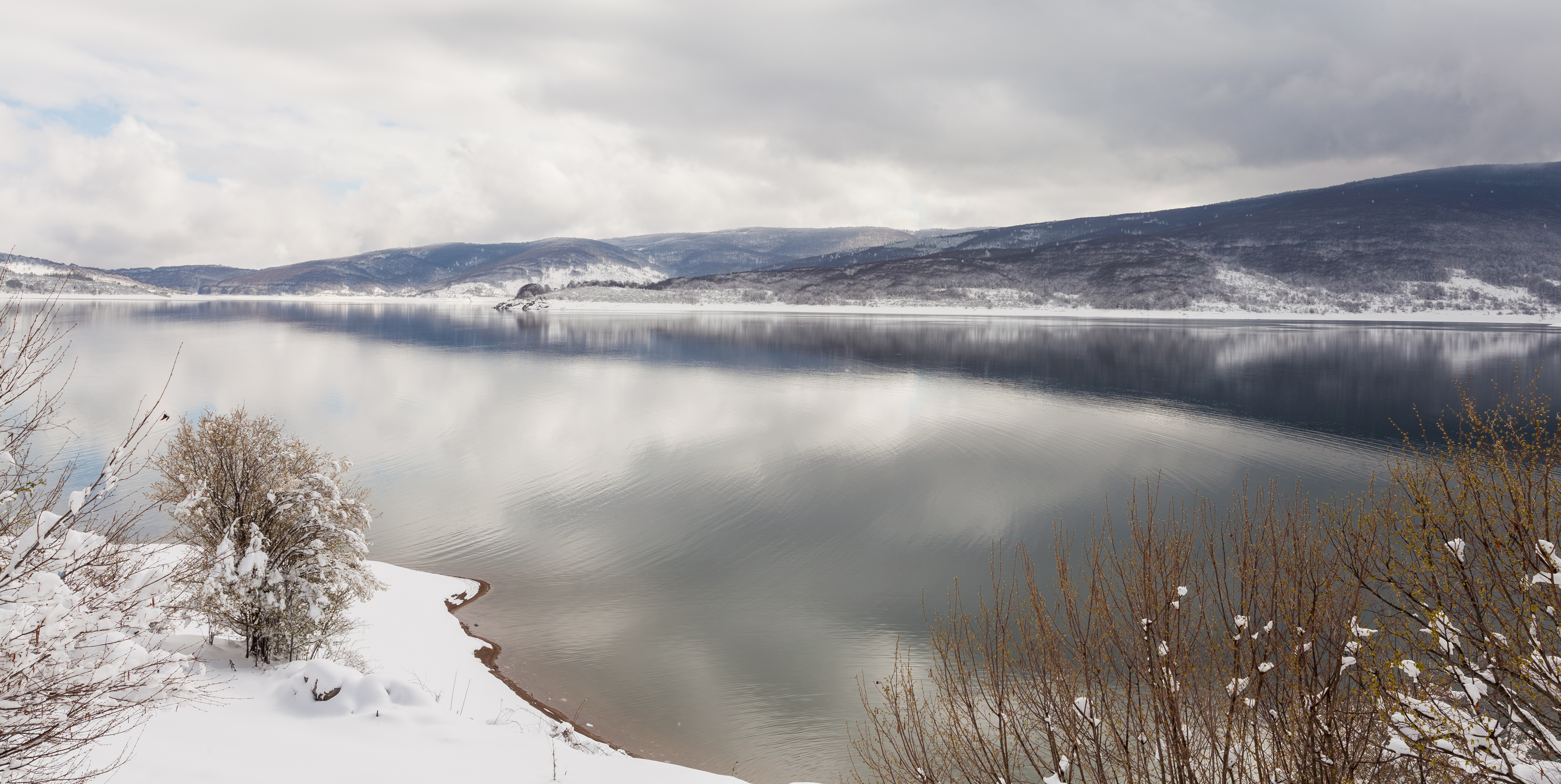
View of the lake in winter

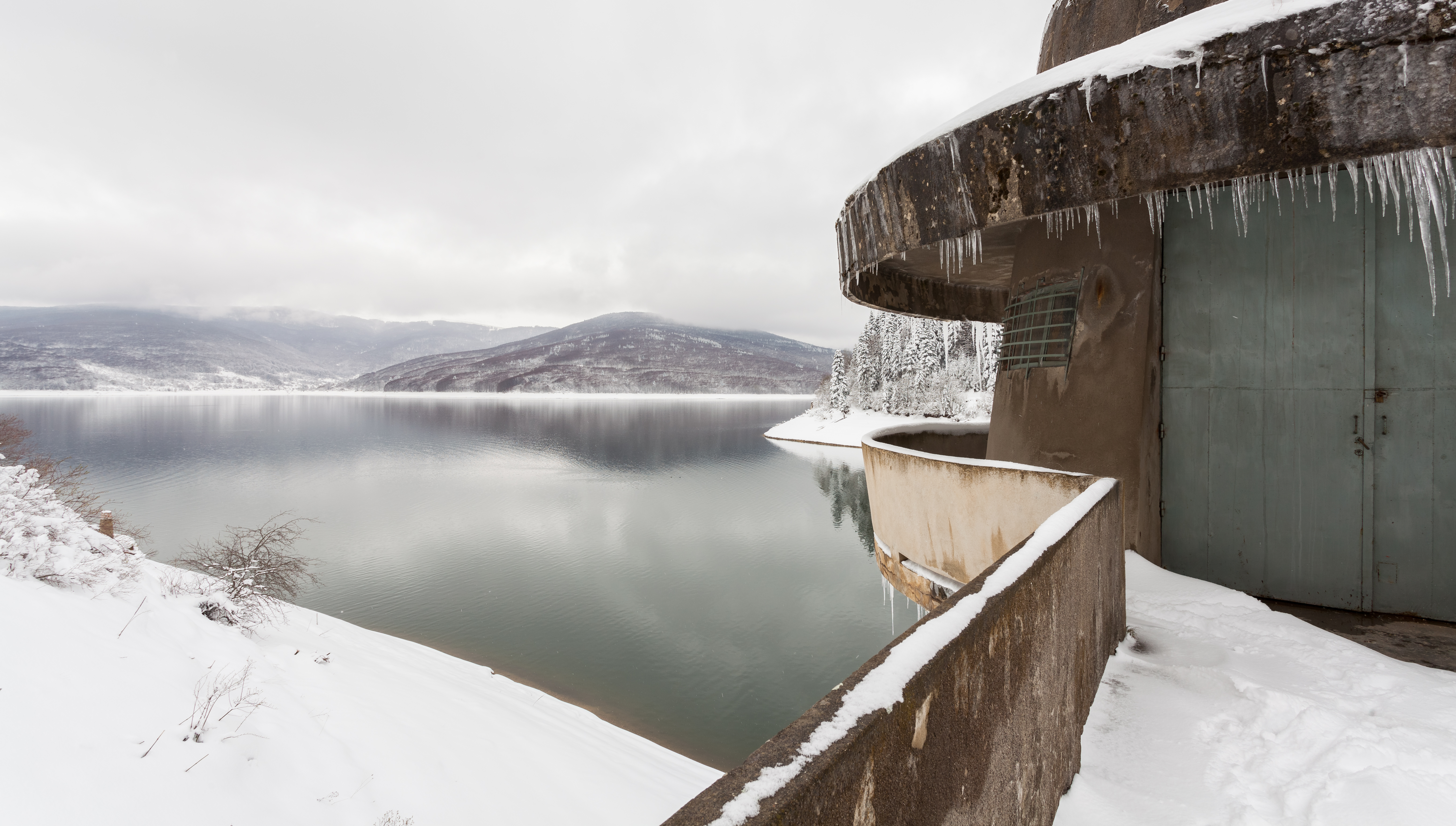
Watchtower at the dam

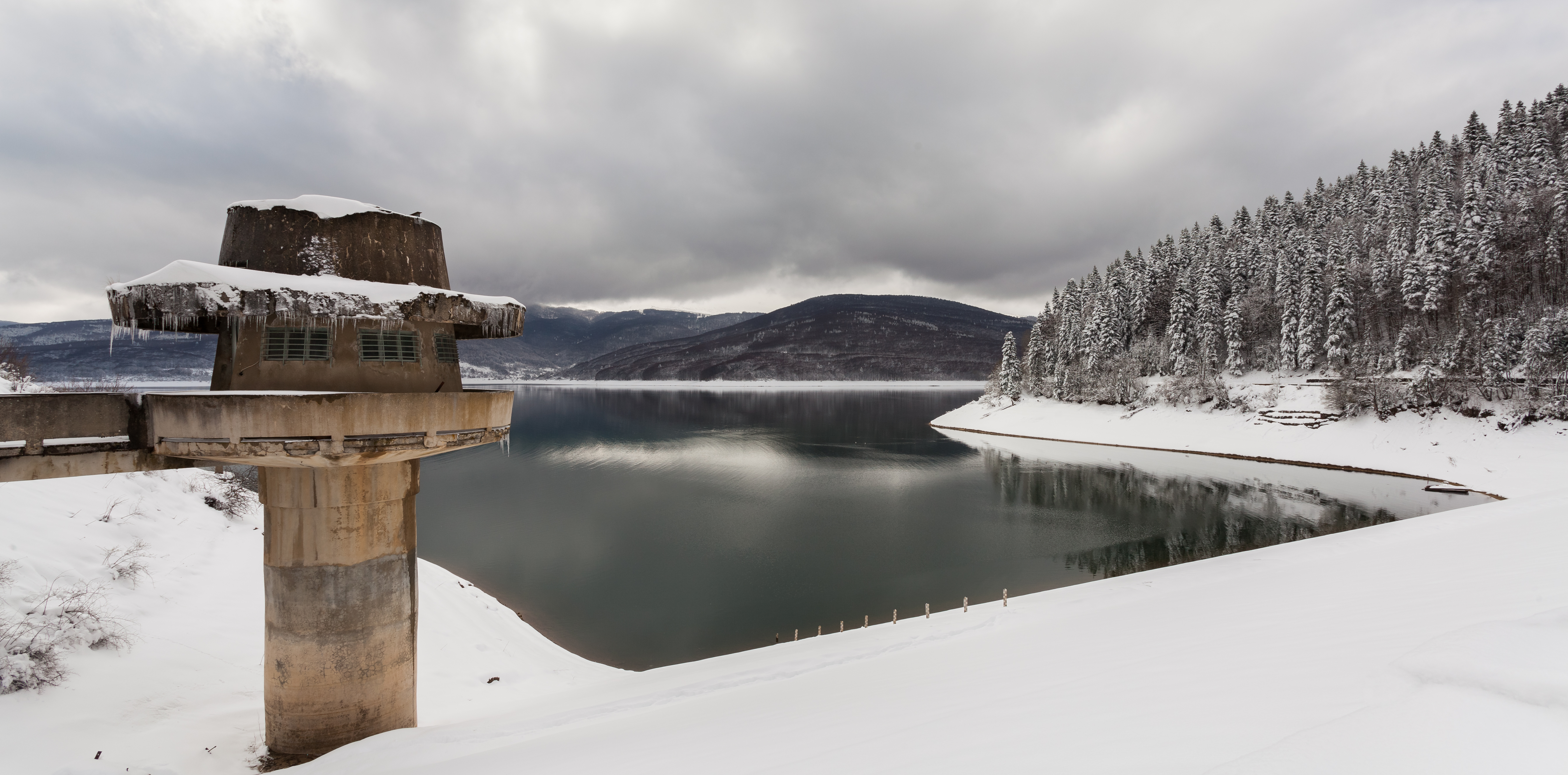
Watchtower at the dam
