= Janče, Mavrovo i Rostuše =

Janče
- Village
- Јанче
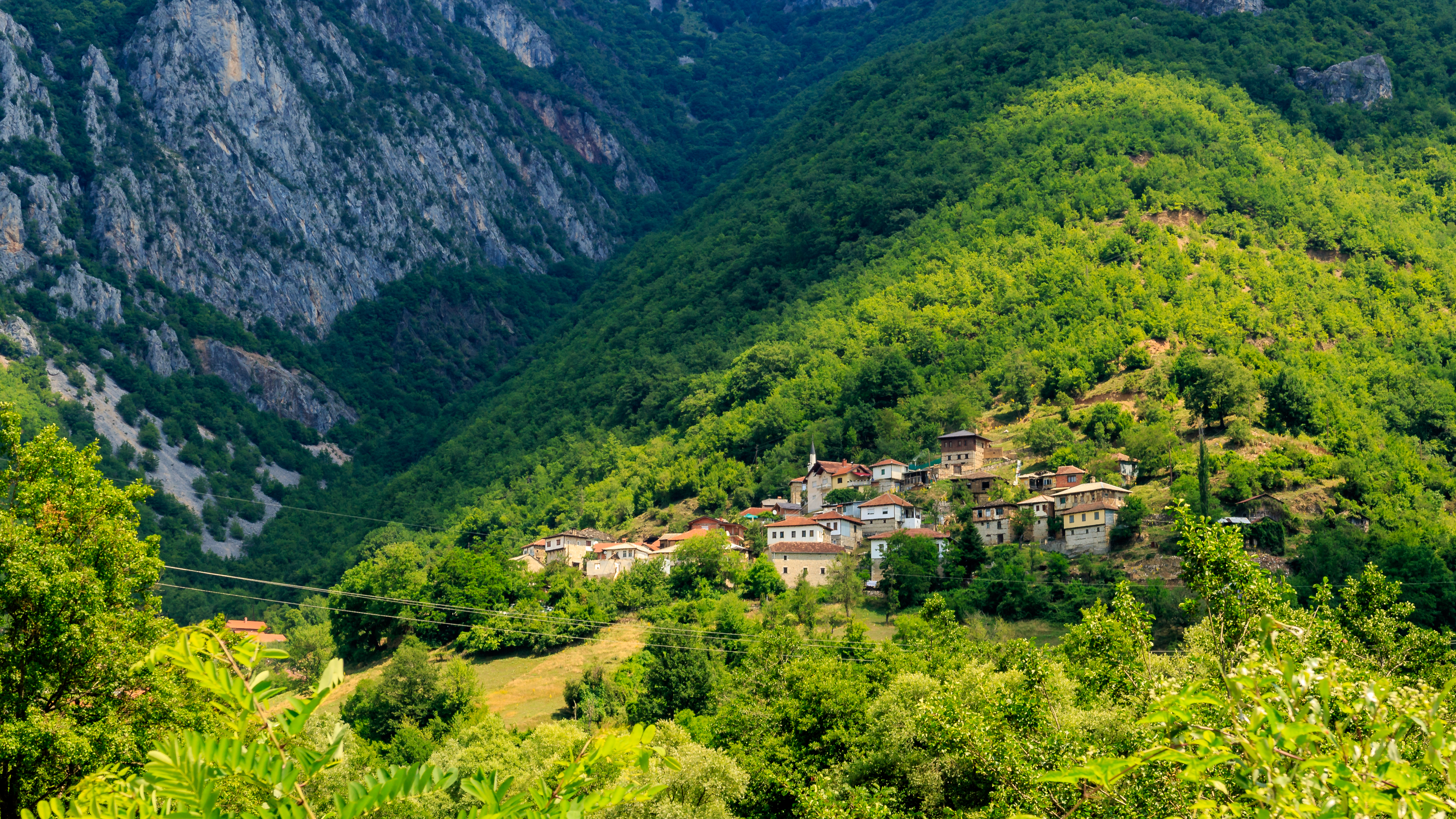
- View of the village

- Location within North Macedonia
- Coordinates: 41°35′N 20°38′E
- Country: North Macedonia
- Region: Polog
- Municipality: Mavrovo and Rostuša

Population (2002)
  - Total: 146
- Time zone: UTC+1 (CET)
  - Summer (DST): UTC+2 (CEST)
- Car plates: GV
- Website: .

Janče (Macedonian: Јанче) is a village in the municipality of Mavrovo and Rostuša, North Macedonia.

== History ==
Local tradition and historical research indicate that the population of present-day Janče previously lived at a nearby site known as Pesja Gorica. Due to repeated raids, the inhabitants relocated to the current location. According to oral tradition, the village was named after an early settler named Jane. Archaeological remains and local memory associate the former settlement with a church dedicated to Saint Elijah (Sv. Ilija) and a nearby cemetery, suggesting continuity of a Christian Slavic population in the area prior to later demographic and religious changes.

== Demographics ==
Janče (Jançi) is recorded in the Ottoman defter of 1467 as a village in the ziamet of Reka. The settlement only had a single household represented by a single household head who bore an Albanian personal name, albeit with a Slavicised patronym: Gjergj Ilijaviqi (Ilijavići).

Janče has traditionally been inhabited by Orthodox Macedonians and a Torbeš population.

According to the 2002 census, the village had a total of 146 inhabitants. Ethnic groups in the village include:

- Macedonians 111
- Turks 33
- Albanians 2
