= Dolno Melničani =

- Village
- Долно Мелничани
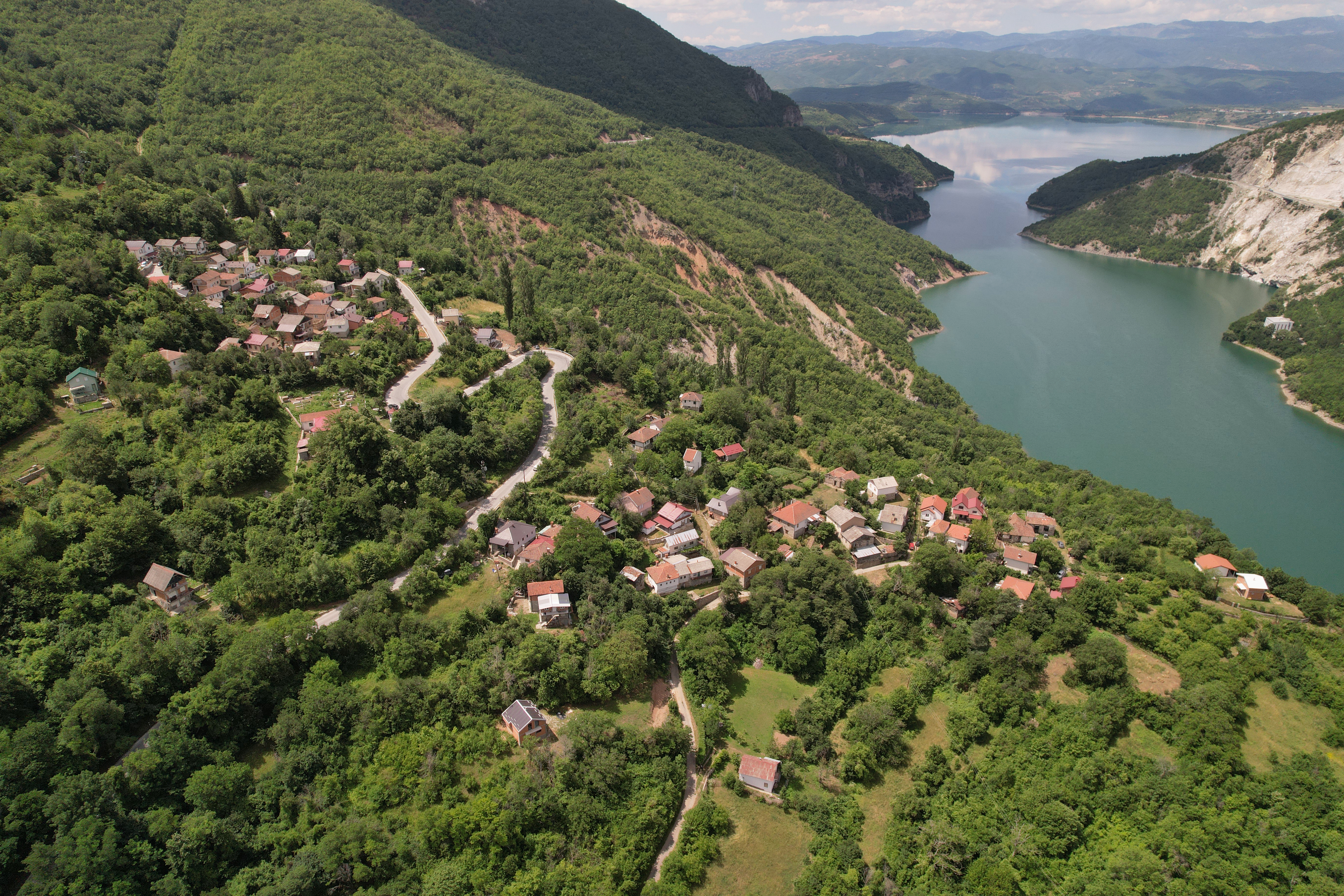
- Airview of the village

- Location within North Macedonia
- Coordinates: 41°30′56″N 20°34′24″E
- Country: North Macedonia
- Region: Southwestern
- Municipality: Centar Župa

Population (2021)
  - Total: 13
- Time zone: UTC+1 (CET)
  - Summer (DST): UTC+2 (CEST)
- Car plates: DB
- Website: .

Dolno Melničani (Macedonian: Долно Мелничани) is a village in the municipality of Centar Župa, North Macedonia.

== Demographics ==
Dolno Melničani (Dolni Menliçani) is attested in the Ottoman defter of 1467 as a village in the ziamet of Reka was under the authority of Karagöz Bey. The village had a total of 5 households and the anthroponymy attested was Slavic in character.

Dolno Melničani has traditionally been inhabited by an Orthodox Macedonian and Torbeši population.

As of the 2021 census, Dolno Melničani had 13 residents with the following ethnic composition:

- Macedonians 13

According to the 2002 census, the village had a total of 11 inhabitants. Ethnic groups in the village include:

- Macedonians 11
