= Skudrinje =

Skudrinje Скудриње
- Village
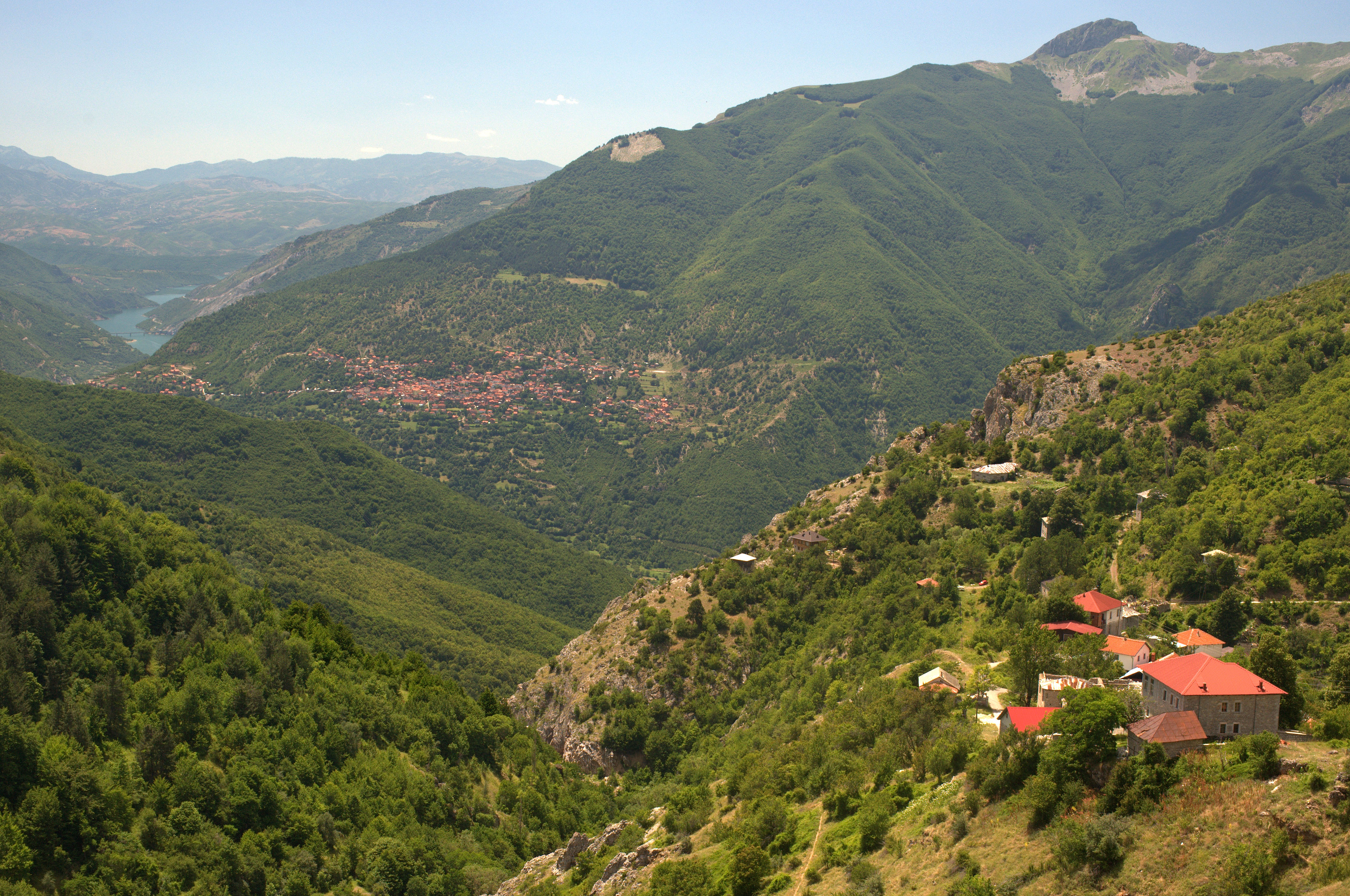
- Panoramic view of the village

- Location within North Macedonia
- Coordinates: 41°34′N 20°37′E
- Country: North Macedonia
- Region: Polog
- Municipality: Mavrovo and Rostuša

Population (2002)
  - Total: 2,119
- Time zone: UTC+1 (CET)
  - Summer (DST): UTC+2 (CEST)
- Postal code: 1257
- Car plates: GV
- Website: https://seloskudrinje.bookmark.com/

Skudrinje (Macedonian: Скудриње) is a village in the municipality of Mavrovo and Rostuša, North Macedonia.

== Demographics ==
Skudrinje (Shkodrina) is recorded in the Ottoman defter of 1467 as a settlement in the ziamet of Reka. The village had a total of 11 households, the heads of which in majority bore typical Albanian personal names, albeit in minority alongside Slavic personal names: Petër Bernakshi; Doikë Bernakshi; Ajdin Filipi; Gjergj Bardhi; Gjergj Bardi, the other; Dikon Popoviqi (Popovići); Pop Gjorgji; Gjon Doksha; Petko Skura; Gjin Skura; Gjon Bernakshi.

In the second part of the 20th century, Skudrinje was inhabited by a Torbeš population.

According to the 2002 census, the village had a total of 2119 inhabitants. Ethnic groups in the village include:

- Turks 1629
- Macedonians 468
- Albanians 5
- Others 17
