= Mala Vraca =

Small Vraca
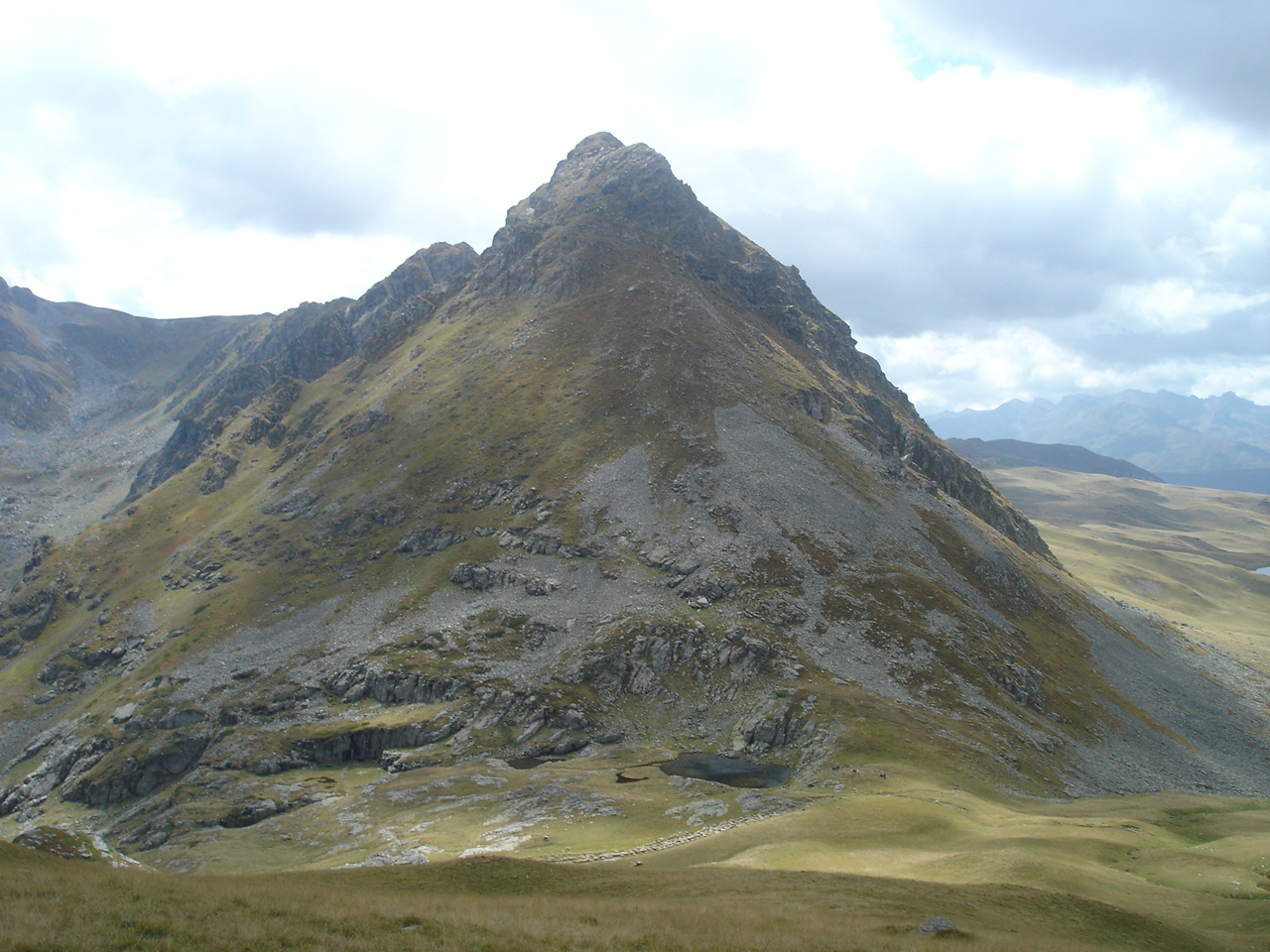
- Small Vraca peak

Highest point
- Elevation: 2,536 m (8,320 ft)
- Coordinates: 41°53′10″N 20°44′15″E

Naming
- Native name: Vraca e Vogël (Albanian); Мала Враца (Macedonian); Mala Vraca (Macedonian)

Geography
- Location within Kosovo Location within Europe
- Location: Kosovo /North Macedonia
- Country: Kosovo / North Macedonia
- Parent range: Šar Mountains

Mala Vraca (Macedonian and Serbian Cyrillic: Мала Враца; Albanian: Vraca e Vogël) is a peak of the Šar Mountains located in Kosovo and North Macedonia. Small Vraca is one of the most southern peaks of the Šar Mountains. It reaches a height of 2,536 m (8,320 ft) or 2,483 m (8,146 ft). So it is smaller than its bigger brother Big Vraca which is 2,582 m (8,471 ft) high.

== See also ==
- Big Vraca
