= Prisojnica =

Prisojnica Присојница
- Village
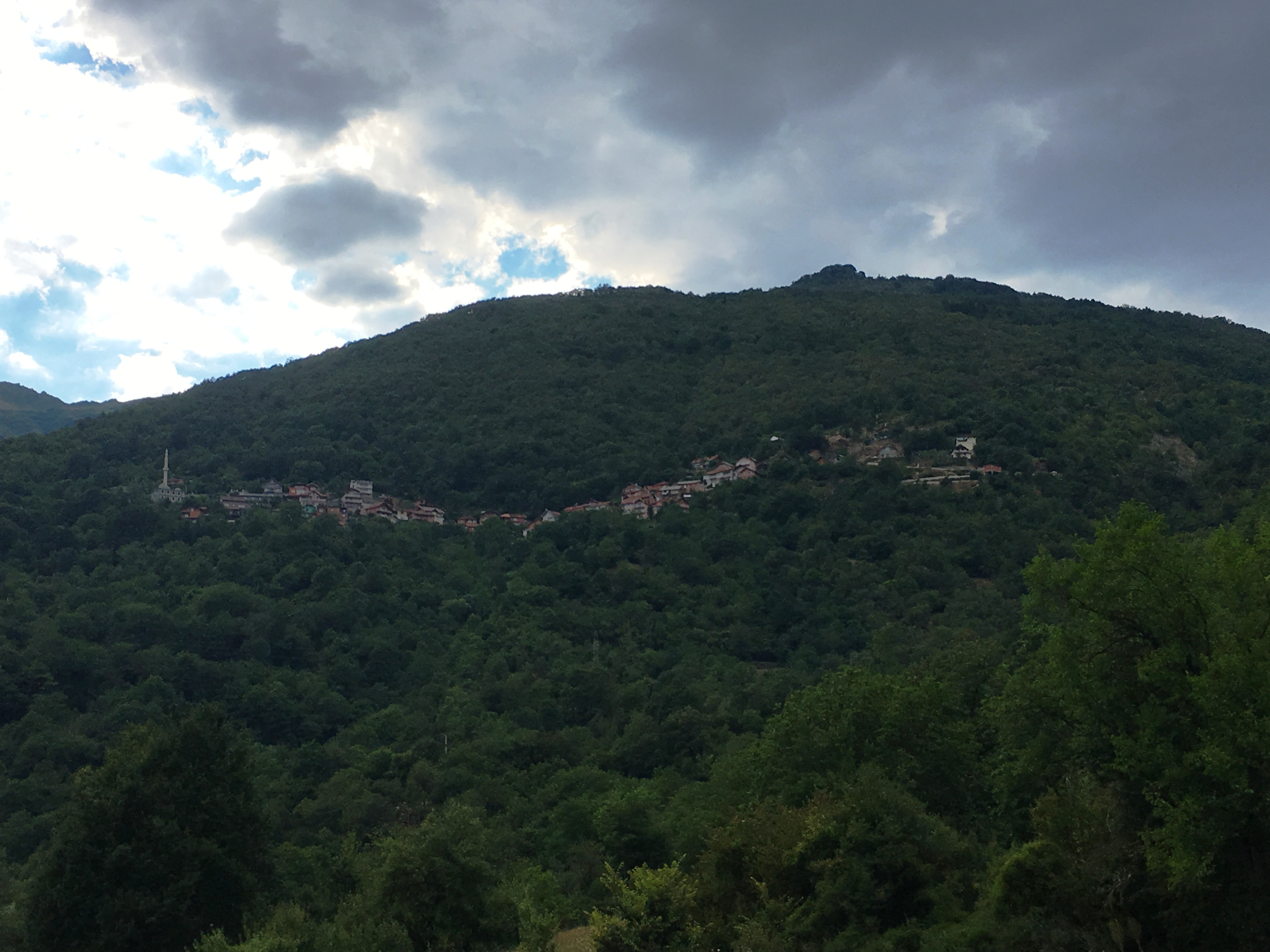
- Panoramic view of the village

- Location within North Macedonia
- Coordinates: 41°35′N 20°37′E
- Country: North Macedonia
- Region: Polog
- Municipality: Mavrovo and Rostuša
- Time zone: UTC+1 (CET)
  - Summer (DST): UTC+2 (CEST)
- Car plates: GV
- Website: .

Prisojnica (Macedonian: Присојница) is a village in the municipality of Mavrovo and Rostuša, North Macedonia.

== Demographics ==
Prisojnica (Prisovinçe) is attested in the Ottoman defter of 1467 as a village in the ziamet of Reka which was under the authority of Karagöz Bey. The settlement had a total of five households and the anthroponymy attested depicts an Albanian character: Progon Primiqyri, Dimitri Gjoneci, Petër Arrasi, Dimitri Arrasi, and Dimitri Palama.

From the 20th century onwards, the village was inhabited by a Torbeš population.

According to the 2002 census, the village had a total of 315 inhabitants. Ethnic groups in the village include:

- Macedonians 232
- Turks 66
- Bosniaks 6
- Albanians 2
- Others 9
