= Nikiforovo =

Nikiforovo Никифорово
- Village
- Location within Arkhangelsk Oblast Location within Russia
- Coordinates: 61°09′N 38°35′E
- Country: Russia
- Region: Arkhangelsk Oblast
- District: Kargopolsky District
- Time zone: UTC+3:00

Nikiforovo (Russian: Никифорово) is a rural locality (a village) in Ukhotskoye Rural Settlement of Kargopolsky District, Arkhangelsk Oblast, Russia. The population was 46 as of 2010.

== Geography ==
Nikiforovo is located 57 km southwest of Kargopol (the district's administrative centre) by road. Zaparino is the nearest rural locality.
