= Golema Vraca =

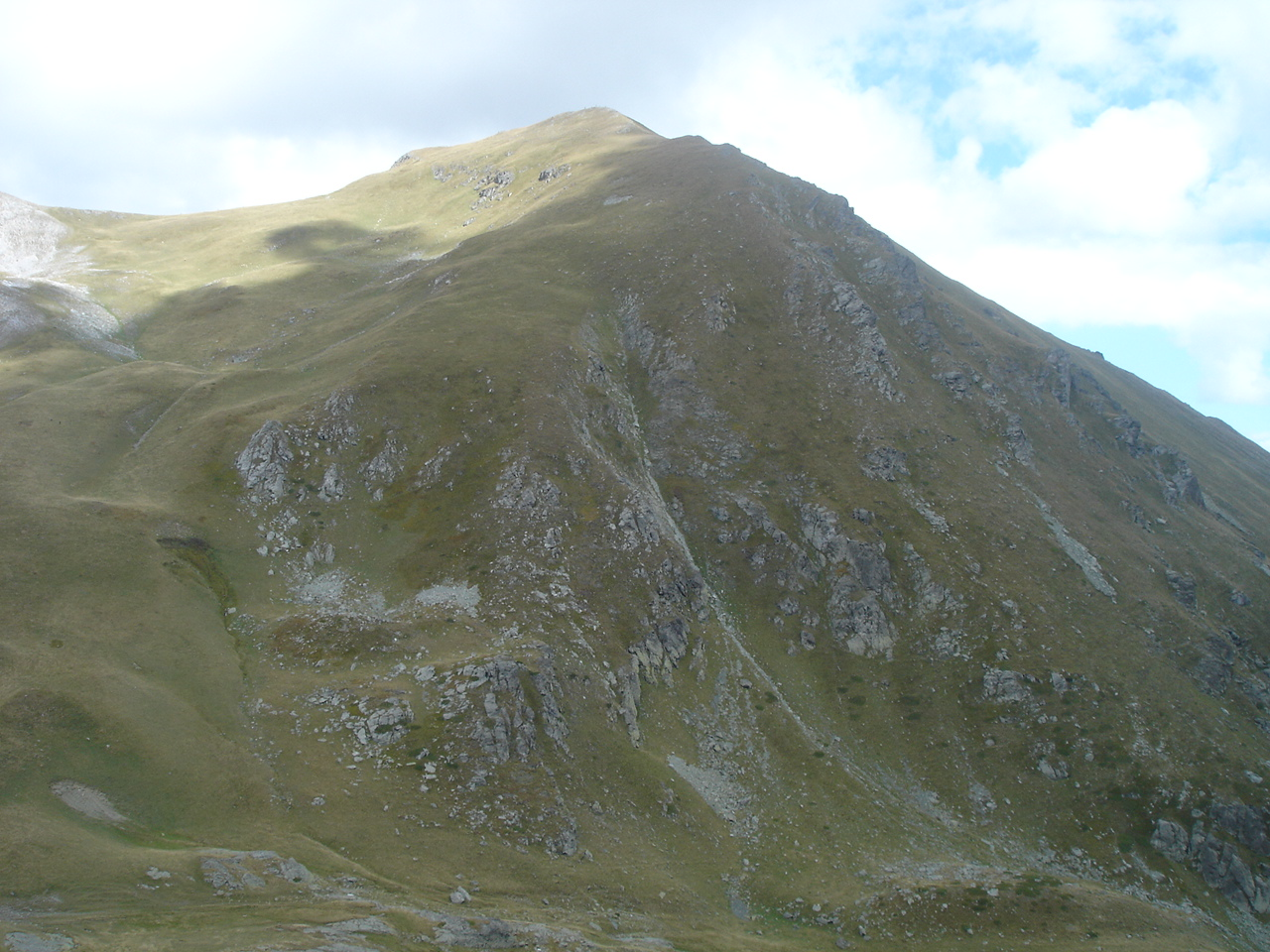
- Peak of Bigger Vraca

Highest point
- Elevation: 2,582 m (8,471 ft)
- Coordinates: 41°53′52″N 20°45′05″E

Naming
- Native name: Vraca e Madhe (Albanian); Голема Враца / Golema Vraca (Macedonian); Велика Враца / Velika Vraca (Serbian)

Geography
- Location within Kosovo Location within Europe
- Location: Kosovo /North Macedonia
- Country: Kosovo / North Macedonia
- Parent range: Šar Mountains

Golema Vraca (Macedonian: Голема Враца; Albanian: Vraca e Madhe; Serbian: Велика Враца, romanized: Velika Vraca) is a mountain in the southern end of the Šar Mountains in Kosovo and North Macedonia. It measures a height of 2,582 m (8,471 ft) above sea level. It is on the Big Vraca in the Kosovan side, where the Radika river originates.

== See also ==
- Small Vraca
