= Mavrovo National Park =

National park in North Macedonia

- IUCN category II (national park)
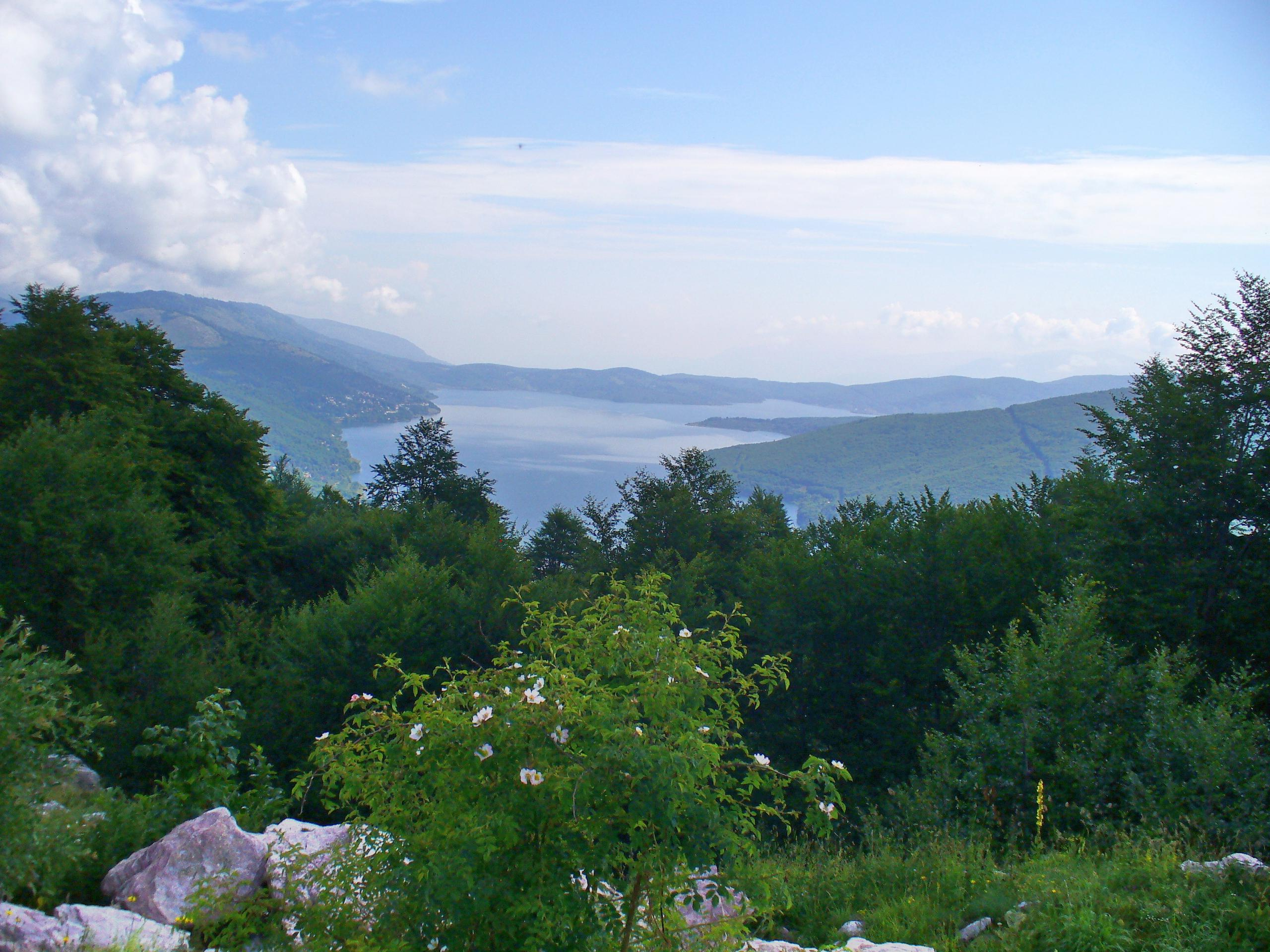
- Mavrovo National Park with Lake Mavrovo in summer

- Location within North Macedonia
- Interactive map of Mavrovo National Park
- Coordinates: 41°41′N 20°42′E
- Area: 73,088 hectares (730.88 km^{2})
- Established: 19 April 1949
- Website: www.npmavrovo.org.mk

Mavrovo National Park (Macedonian: Национален парк Маврово) is the largest of the four national parks of North Macedonia, within the borders of the municipality of Mavrovo and Rostuse. Located in the west of the country, it spreads over an area of about 780 km^{2} (300 square miles) and is characterized by deep canyons, lakes, and dense forests that abound with diverse wildlife. It was established in 1949 by a law passed by the National Assembly of Socialist Republic of Macedonia; later the legislation was changed to enforce a much stricter protection system, dividing the park into three zones: strict nature reserves, managed reserves, and a tourist zone.

The relief of the park contains three Alpine mountain systems: the Šar, Korab and Bistra mountains. The Šar and Korab exceed heights of 2700 m (the Korab peak, with its 2764 m, is the highest in North Macedonia). These mountains are distinguished by chains of snowy, jagged peaks and broad grassy plateaus below them. Between the three mountains extends the Radika gorge for more than 25 km (16 miles). Vertical cliffs exceeding 300 m (980 feet) rise above the waters of the Radika river.

The park area contains other interesting natural phenomena—the highest waterfall in the Balkans (with a vertical fall of approximately 120 m), alpine bogs in the Šar mountains as remnants of the Ice age, rare karst relief (including beautiful caves) in the Bistra mountains, as well as numerous glacial lakes throughout the Alpine zone.

The national park, the lake, and the region are named after the village of Mavrovo.

== Ecology ==
Dense forest vegetation covers mountain slopes in the park, while Alpine pastures grow in the higher areas. The various climatic influences, as well as the large differences in altitude are the main contributing factors for the diversity of flora and fauna. The fact that this region is a kind of "geographical crossroads" where major changes of climate have occurred through history is a direct reason for the existence of an enormous number of relict and endemic species. Remnants of the life that existed in the Ice age or in the Tertiary coexist in one diverse environment, concealed between the jagged cliffs and peaks. In fact, the six life zones of the park (a rare phenomenon for such a small area) support 22 forest and 16 grass ecosystems. There are more than 1300 species of herbaceous plants and 145 species of trees living in them. About 40 percent of them are relict or endemic. Moreover, the park is the habitat of many rare plants (like the Crimean wild juniper) which are extinct in their natural habitat.

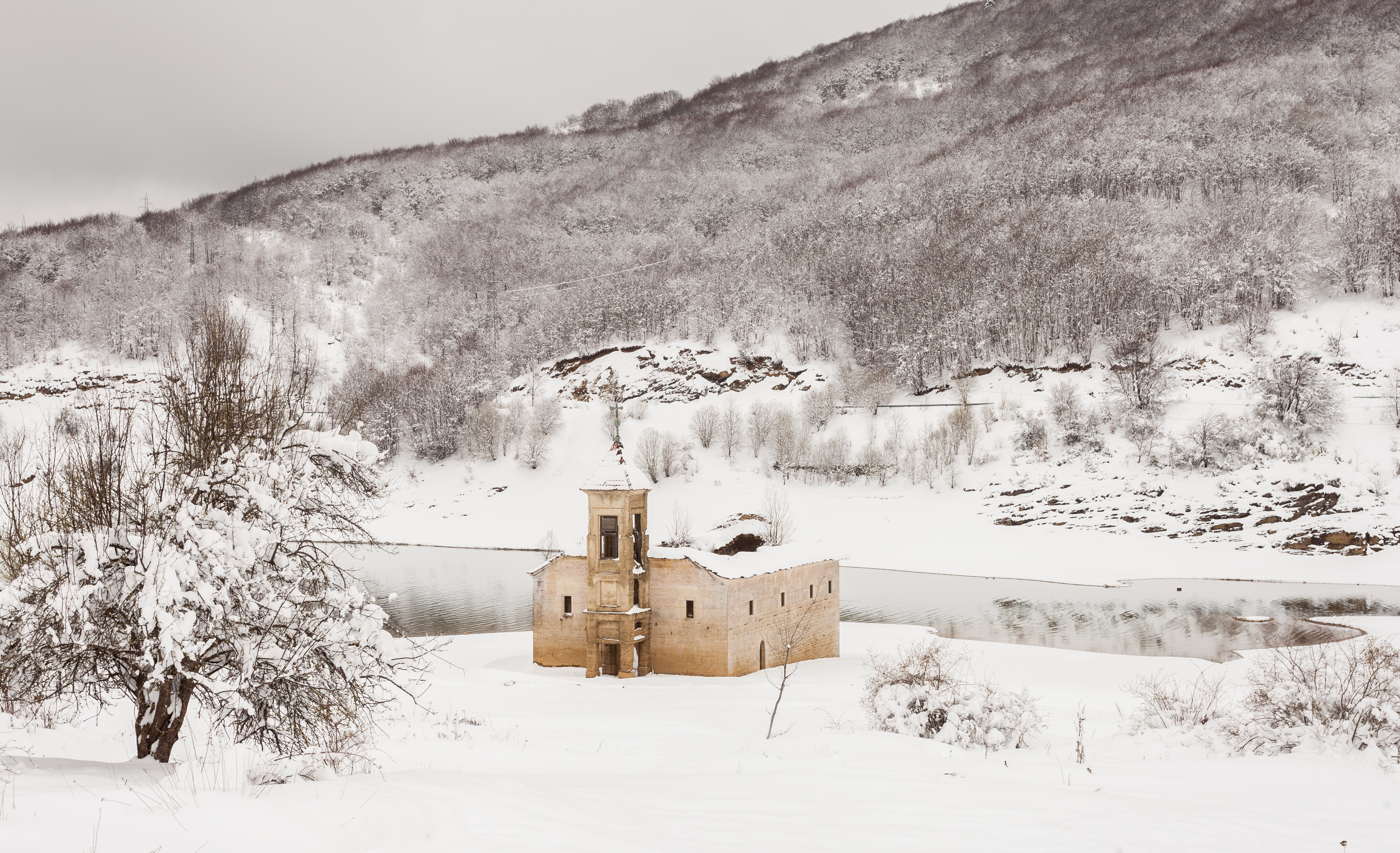
Submerged church of St. Nicholas

Nearby stands the Saint Jovan Bigorski Monastery, which with its famous carved wooden iconostasis has retained colorful folklore traditions.

This iconostasis is a sample of traditional woodcarving which can be found in North Macedonia along with the 19th-century iconostasis of the church of the Holi Saviour (Crkva Sveti Spas) in Skopje. In Galičnik, one of the largest villages in Mavrovo, folklore traditions are cherished as they had been centuries ago. As a result of its long geological history, the park abounds with relics from the tertiary and glacial epochs (even two plant species from the early tropical vegetation).

The most interesting tertiary relics are the Macedonian pine and the Bosnian pine, rare endemic conifers of the Central Balkans. This group includes the endemic Greek maple and the yew (extremely uncommon in the Mediterranean). One of the few natural habitats of the common chestnuts (an endemic Balkan tertiary relic) exists on the southern slopes of Mount Bistra. Large areas of the park are covered in forests of the Macedonian fir (a riddling hybrid fir species) which is to be found only in this part of the Balkans and is also a remnant of the late Tertiary age.

Through the Forest Reserve Jasen, the park abounds with numerous glacial relic species from the Ice age, mostly in the form of awkward herbaceous plants scattered throughout the Alpine zone. Certainly one of the most dazzling forests is the community of Norway spruce hidden deep in an inaccessible canyon of the Western Šar mountains. This forest is far beyond the southernmost point of the range of Norway spruce, indicating that a long time ago it had invaded the Mediterranean regions.

The diverse forest vegetation supports an abundance of wildlife. More than 140 species of birds (some of them very rare, like hawks, eagles and vultures) thrive in the forested areas of the park. With more than 45 species, the park is among the richest reserves of rare animals. There are bears, several types of deer, wild goats, otters, wolves, etc. Most importantly, the Mavrovo National Park is one of the three remaining habitats of the Balkan lynx. A permanent population of 18 specimens of this near-extinct sub-species lives predominantly in the western and central areas of the park.

== Gallery ==
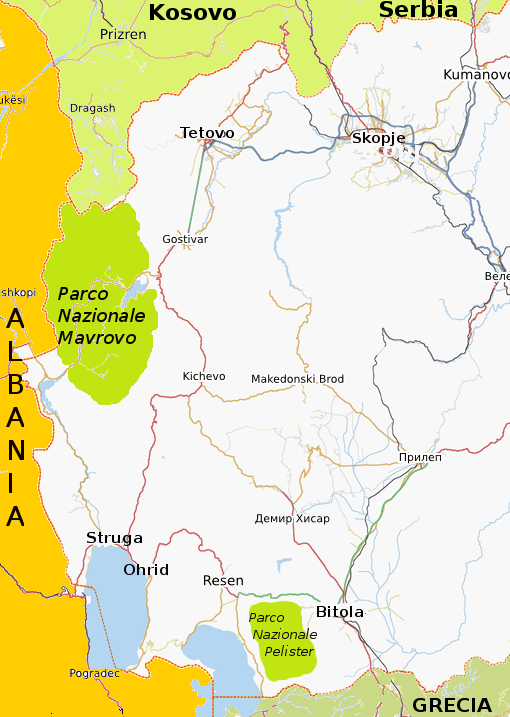
Mavrovo National Park marked on a map (left)

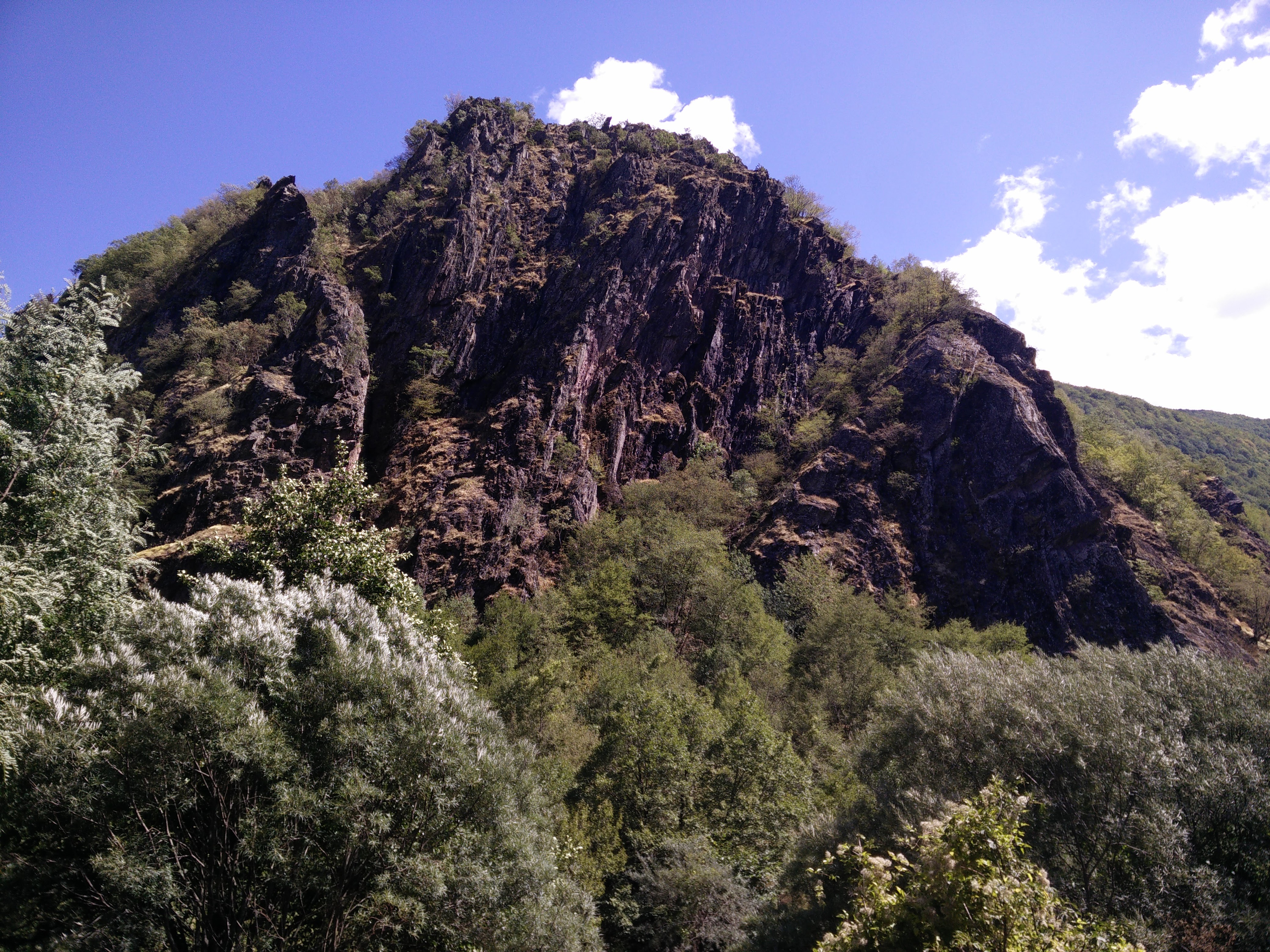
Mavrovo National Park

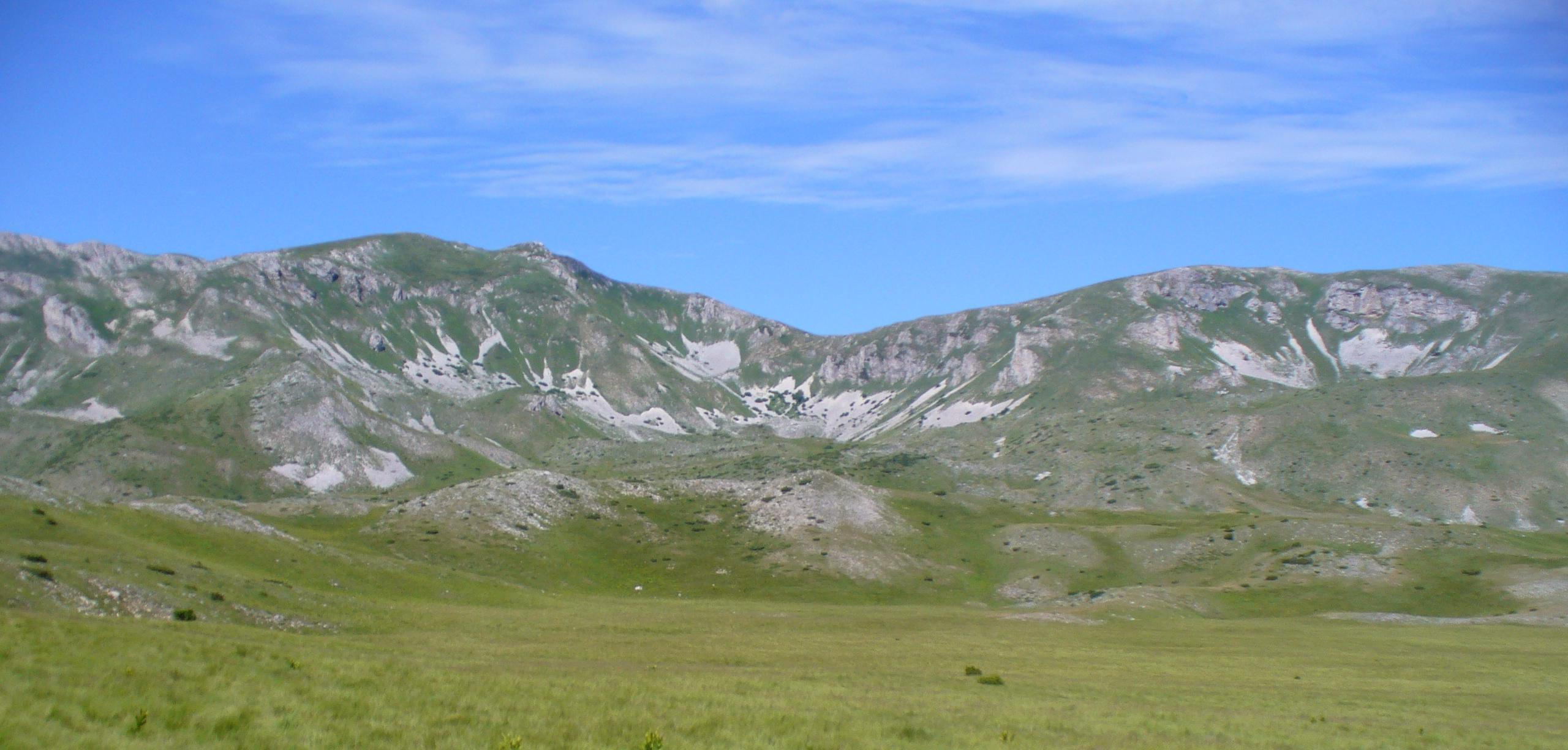
Mount Bistra within the national park

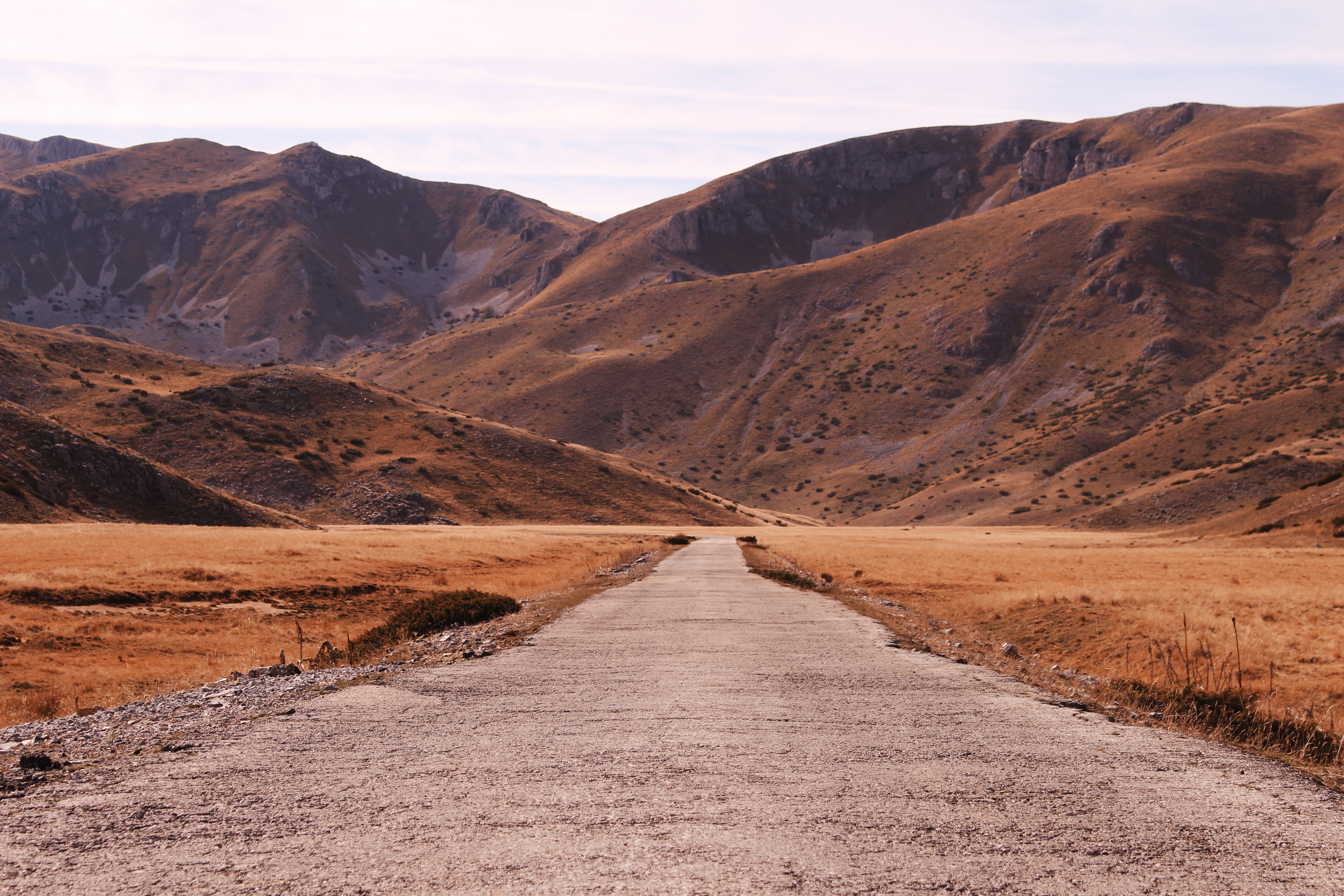

== See also ==
- List of national parks in North Macedonia
- Lukovo Pole hydro power project
