= Konjushka (peak) =

Mountain peak in Kosovo and North Macedonia

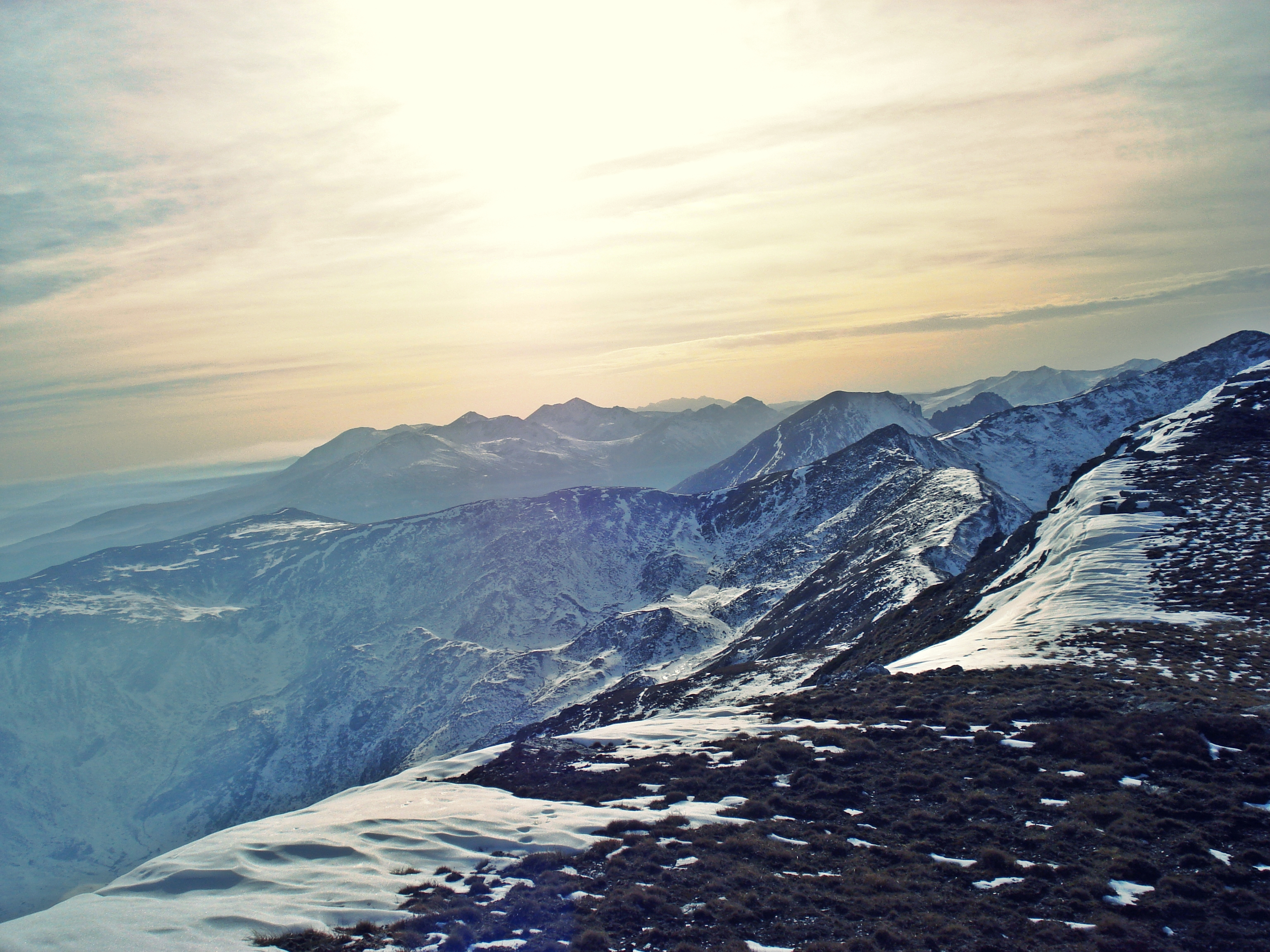
- The view from the Konjushka peak

Highest point
- Elevation: 2,571 m (8,435 ft)
- Coordinates: 42°08′17″N 20°56′41″E

Geography
- Location within Kosovo Location within North Macedonia
- Location: Prizren, Kosovo; Tetovë, North Macedonia
- Countries: Kosovo; North Macedonia
- Parent range: Sharr Mountains

Konjushka (Albanian: Maja e Konjushkës; ) is a mountain peak in the Sharr Mountains in the border between Kosovo and North Macedonia. The peak has an altitude of 2,571 m (8,435 ft).

The peak is part of the Sharr Mountains National Park in Kosovo.

== See also ==
- List of mountains in Kosovo
- List of mountains in North Macedonia
- National parks of Kosovo
