= Deshat =

Mountain on the border between Albania and North Macedonia

- Dešat
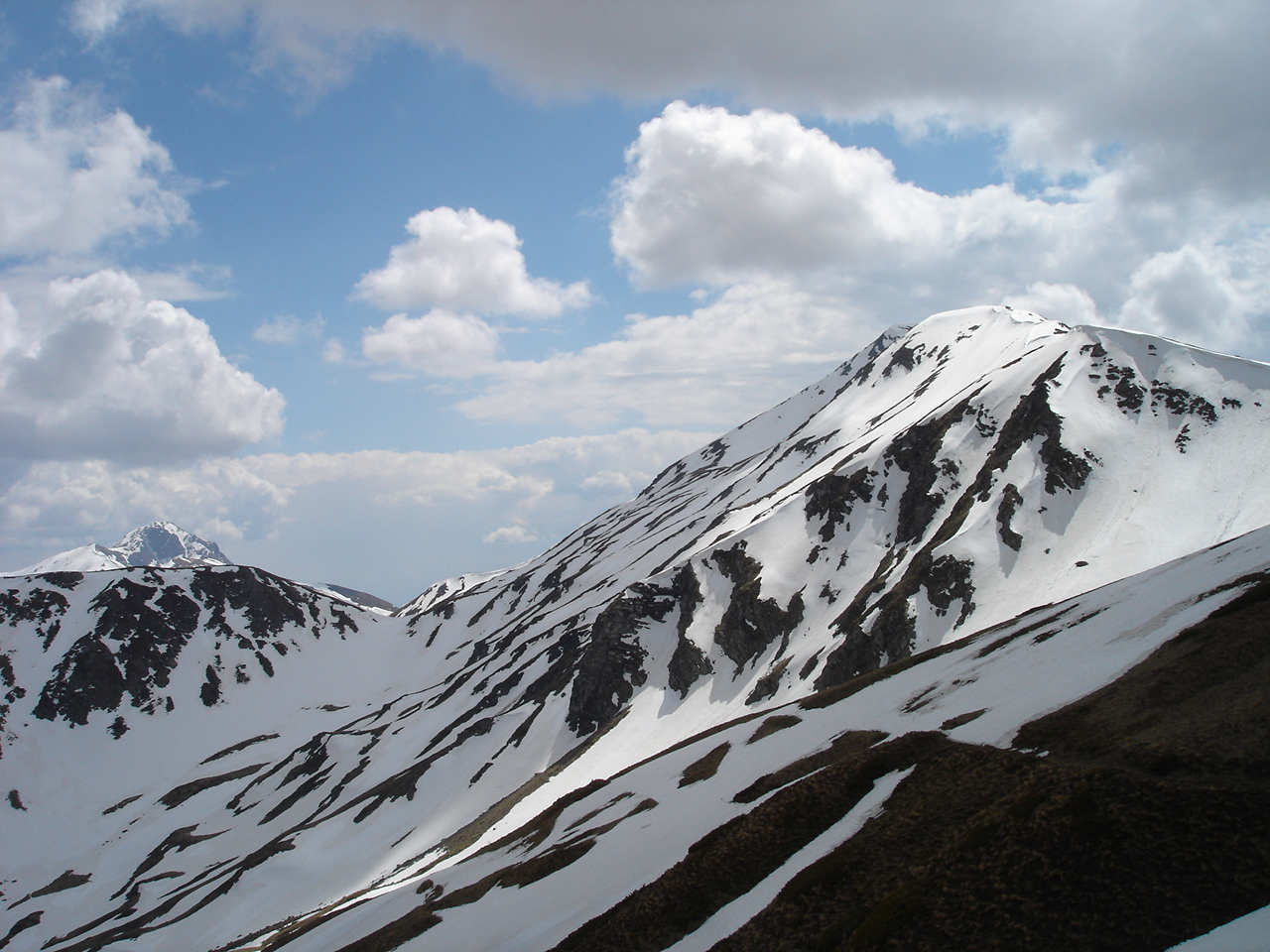
- Velivar is the highest peak of the massif

Highest point
- Elevation: 2,372 m (7,782 ft)
- Prominence: 409 m (1,342 ft)
- Isolation: 51 m (167 ft)
- Coordinates: 41°38′14″N 20°31′30″E

Geography
- Location within Albania Location within North Macedonia
- Countries: Albania; North Macedonia
- Region: Central Mountain Region
- Municipality: Dibër, Mavrovo and Rostuša
- Parent range: Korab

Geology
- Rock age: Mesozoic
- Mountain type: massif
- Rock type(s): flysch, limestone

Deshat (def. 'Deshati'; Macedonian: Dešat or Дешат) is a massif situated in the Korab mountain range, on the border between Albania and North Macedonia. Positioned at the southeastern tip of the range, it is bounded by the Dibër basin to the south (known as Gryka e Radikës), Banja stream valley to the north, Black Drin valley to the west and Radikë valley (the right branch of the Black Drin) to the east.

The Deshat watershed serves as a dividing line between both countries. The larger section of the massif is located within Albania proper, including the two highest peaks, Velivar 2,372 m (7,782 ft) and Kërçinë 2,342 m (7,684 ft).

== Geology ==
Composed predominantly of flysch and partially of Mesozoic limestone, the massif presents a rugged structure with a combination of scaly and blocky formations. It has an elongated shape, aligned in a nearly north-south orientation, featuring a relatively gentle relief. Its two prominent peaks showcase typical dome-like shapes. The slopes of the mountain bear the marks of glacial cirques, particularly on the eastern side.

== Biodiversity ==
Vegetation on Deshat varies with altitude, encompassing oak forests from 700 to 1,000 meters, with beech forests extending up to 1,700 meters and lush alpine meadows. Additionally, sulfur deposits can be found at the foothills of Kërçinë, in the area known as Kërçisht.

== See also ==
- List of mountains in Albania
- List of mountains in North Macedonia
