= Bistra (mountain) =

Mountain in North Macedonia

Coordinates: 41.3600°N 20.4300°E

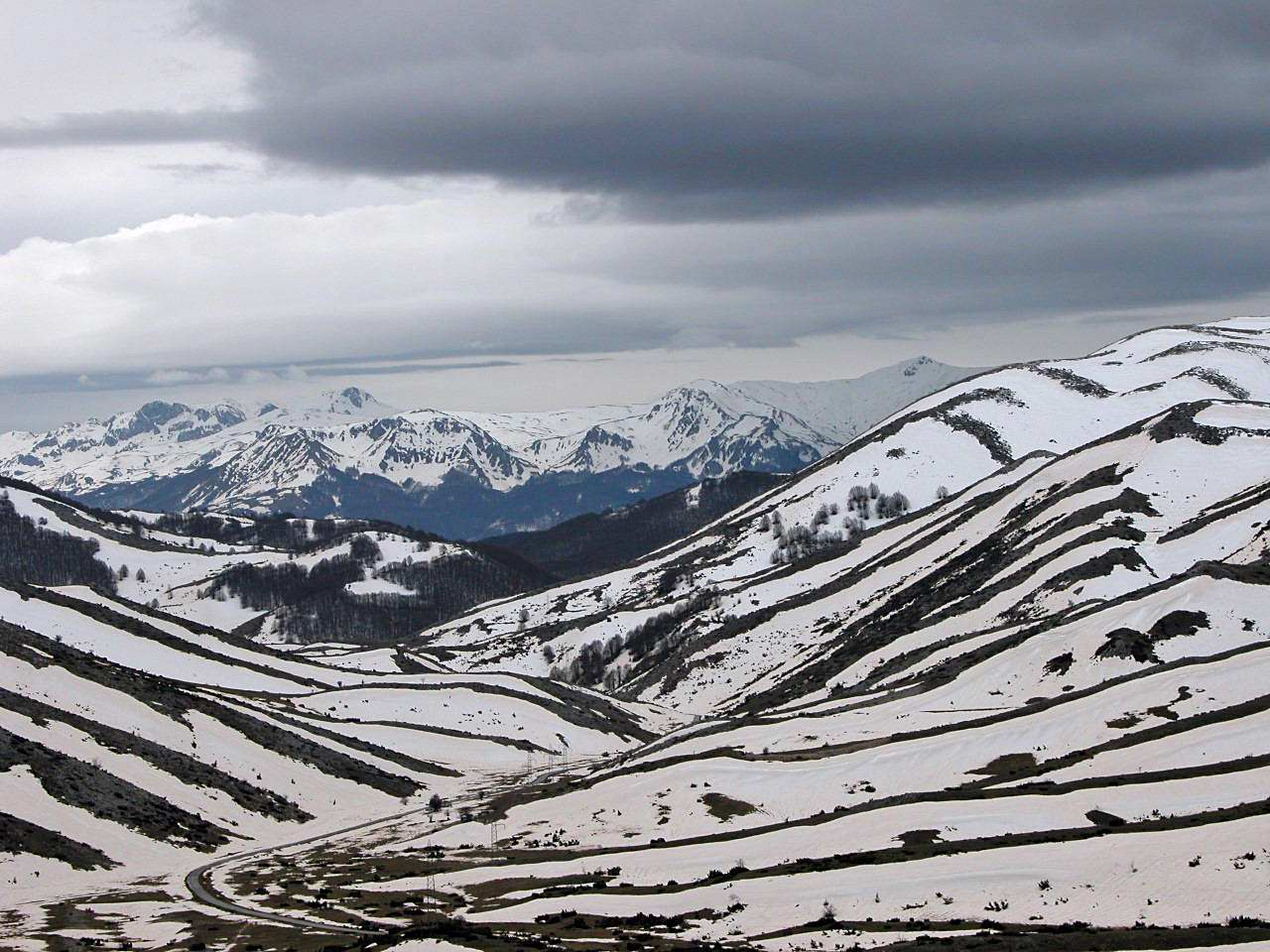
- Snow on the Bistra

Highest point
- Elevation: 2,163 m (7,096 ft)

Geography
- Location within North Macedonia
- Location: North Macedonia
- Parent range: Dinaric Alps

Geology
- Mountain type: Limestone massif

Climbing
- Easiest route: Hike

The Bistra (Macedonian: Бистра) is a massif in North Macedonia. The massif has several summits higher than 2,000 metres, with the highest being Medenica at 2,163 metres above sea level.

Limestone erosion on the mountain created a total of 14 limestone fields, which are located in the limestone region of the Bistra: Tonivoda, Govedarnik, Bardaš, Sultanica, Solomunica, Suvo Pole, Small and Big Brzovec, Čukni Topanica, Lower and Upper Poljce, Tri Bari, Tri Groba, and Lazaropole.

Much of the mountain's area lies within the boundaries of the Mavrovo National Park, which is known for its flora and fauna.
