= List of lakes of the Šar Mountains (Kosovo) =

This is a list of lakes located in Kosovo's Šar Mountains.

== List ==
| Name | Image | Elevation | Notes | Location |
|---|---|---|---|---|
| Crn Vir Lake | | 2,350 metres (7,710 ft) | The lake has a maximum length of 35 m (115 ft) and a maximum width of 20 m (66 ft). Like many other lakes close by, it is surrounded by varied rock compositions. | List of lakes of the Šar Mountains (Kosovo) is located in Kosovo |
| Dinivodno Lake | | 2,260 metres (7,410 ft) | The lake is circular-shaped, with a maximum length of 109 m (358 ft) and a maximum width of 55 m (180 ft). It is 80 cm (31 in) deep. There is a bunch of grass that has made to the surface of the lake making it look like an island. | List of lakes of the Šar Mountains (Kosovo) is located in Kosovo |
| Donji Vir Lake | | | The lake is circular-shaped, with a rough diameter of 30 m (98 ft). It is situated just a few metres west of the larger Small Jazhincë Lake. | List of lakes of the Šar Mountains (Kosovo) is located in Kosovo |
| Jazhincë Lake | | 2,180 metres (7,150 ft) | The lake has a maximum length of 125 m (410 ft) and a maximum width of 90 m (300 ft). It is 12 m (39 ft) deep and has a total surface area of 8,500 m^{2} (2.1 acres). On some sides the lake is surrounded by large rocks, which makes it ideal for animals to hide or live in. | List of lakes of the Šar Mountains (Kosovo) is located in Kosovo |
| Livadh Lake | | 2,173 metres (7,129 ft) | The lake has a maximum length of 228 m (748 ft) and a maximum width of 120 m (390 ft). It is 7.3 m (24 ft) deep and has a total surface area of 0.017 km^{2} (4.2 acres). It is next to the Tumba Peak (Šar) and Maja Livadh peaks. | List of lakes of the Šar Mountains (Kosovo) is located in Kosovo |

== See also ==
- Geography of Kosovo
- List of lakes in Kosovo
