= Maja e zezë =

Mountain in Kosovo and North Macedonia

- Crn Vrv
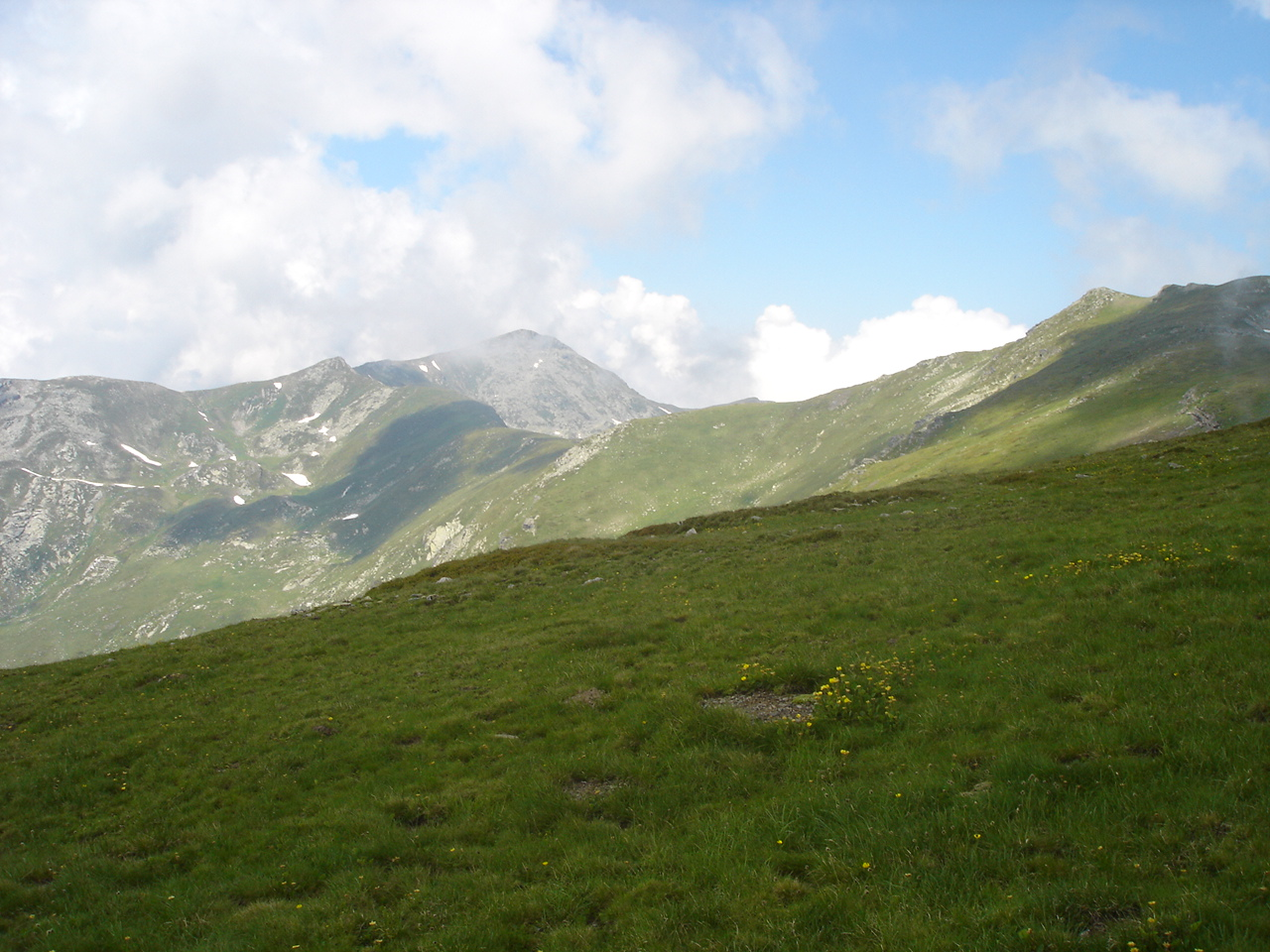

Highest point
- Elevation: 2,528 m (8,294 ft)
- Coordinates: 42°7′45″N 20°55′10″E

Geography
- Location within Kosovo
- Location: North Macedonia, and Republic of Kosovo
- Parent range: Šar Mountains

Maja e Zezë (Macedonian: Црн Врв, romanized: Crn Vrv; Serbo-Croatian: Црни Врх, Crni Vrh, meaning black peak), is a mountain in Kosovo and North Macedonia. It is part of the Šar Mountains range and is 2,585 m (8,481 ft) high. To the east of the mountain is Peskovi (2,651 m or 8,698 ft), and to the west of it is Kobilica (2,528 m or 8,294 ft).
