= Vrtop =

Vrtop may refer to:

== Mountains ==
=== Kosovo ===
- Vrtop (peak); a mountain peak in the Kobilica massif

=== Serbia ===
- The peak of Gramada (mountain)
