= Crni Kamen =

Crni Kamen (Cyrillic: Црни Камен), meaning "black stone" in Serbo-Croatian and Macedonian, may refer to:

- Crni Kamen Peak, a peak of the Šar Mountains, located in Kosovo and North Macedonia
- Crni Kamen River, a river in Kosovo, an affluent of the Radika river
- Crni Kamen, near Selecka Planina and Prilep North Macedonia
