= Tumba Peak =

Tumba Peak may refer to:

- Tumba Peak (Šar), a peak located in Kosovo and part of the Šar Mountains
- Tumba Peak (Belasica), a peak located in Belasica mountains in the region of Macedonia
