= Gjini Beg =

Mountain peak in Kosovo and North Macedonia

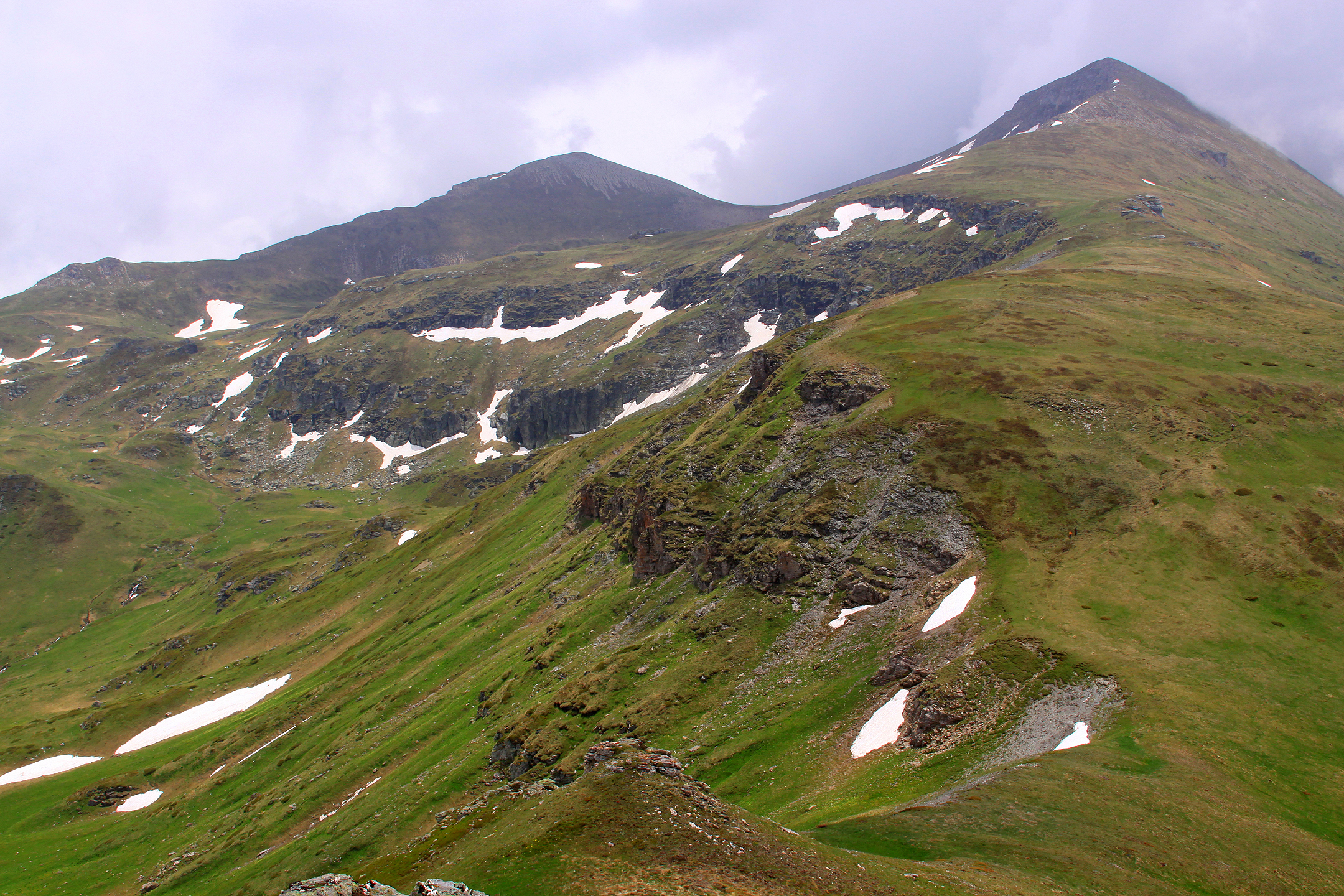
- Gjini Beg and Terpeznica

Highest point
- Elevation: 2,610 m (8,560 ft)
- Coordinates: 42°02′39″N 20°45′59″E

Geography
- Location within Kosovo
- Location: Kosovo
- Countries: Kosovo; North Macedonia
- Parent range: Sharr Mountains

Gjini Beg (Albanian: Gjini Beg; Macedonian: Џини Бег, romanized: Džini Beg) is a peak in the Sharr Mountains found on the boundary between Kosovo and North Macedonia. Gjini Beg reaches a top height of 2,610 m (8,563 ft) and is totally covered with short grass. To the extreme south of Gjini Beg in Kosovo is the large Dinivodno Lake which is shaped like a circle and is 80 cm (31 in) deep.
