= Upper Blateštičko Lake =

Lake in Kosovo

- Location within Kosovo Location within Europe
- Interactive map of Upper Blateštičko Lake
- Location: Šar Mountains
- Coordinates: 42°09′14″N 21°01′07″E
- Basin countries: Kosovo
- Surface elevation: 2,220 m (7,280 ft)

The Upper Blateštičko Lake (Serbian: Горње блатештичко језеро / Gornje blateštičko jezero, Albanian: Liqeni i Baltishtës së Epërme) is a small lake in the south of Kosovo. The lake is found on an altitude of 2,220 m (7,283 ft) above sea level in the high Šar Mountains. The lake is found near the peak of Crni Kamen rising up to 2,536 m (8,320 ft). It is located 200m from the Lower Blateštičko Lake.

== See also ==
- List of lakes of Kosovo

== Sources ==
- "Mala enciklopedija Prosveta: Opšta enciklopedija". Мала енциклопедија Просвета (3 ed.). Београд: Просвета. 1985. ISBN 978-86-07-00001-2.
- Марковић, Јован Ђ. (1990). Енциклопедијски географски лексикон Југославије. Сарајево: Свјетлост. ISBN 978-86-01-02651-3.
