= Šar Mountains =

Mountain range in Southeast Europe

- Sharr Mountains
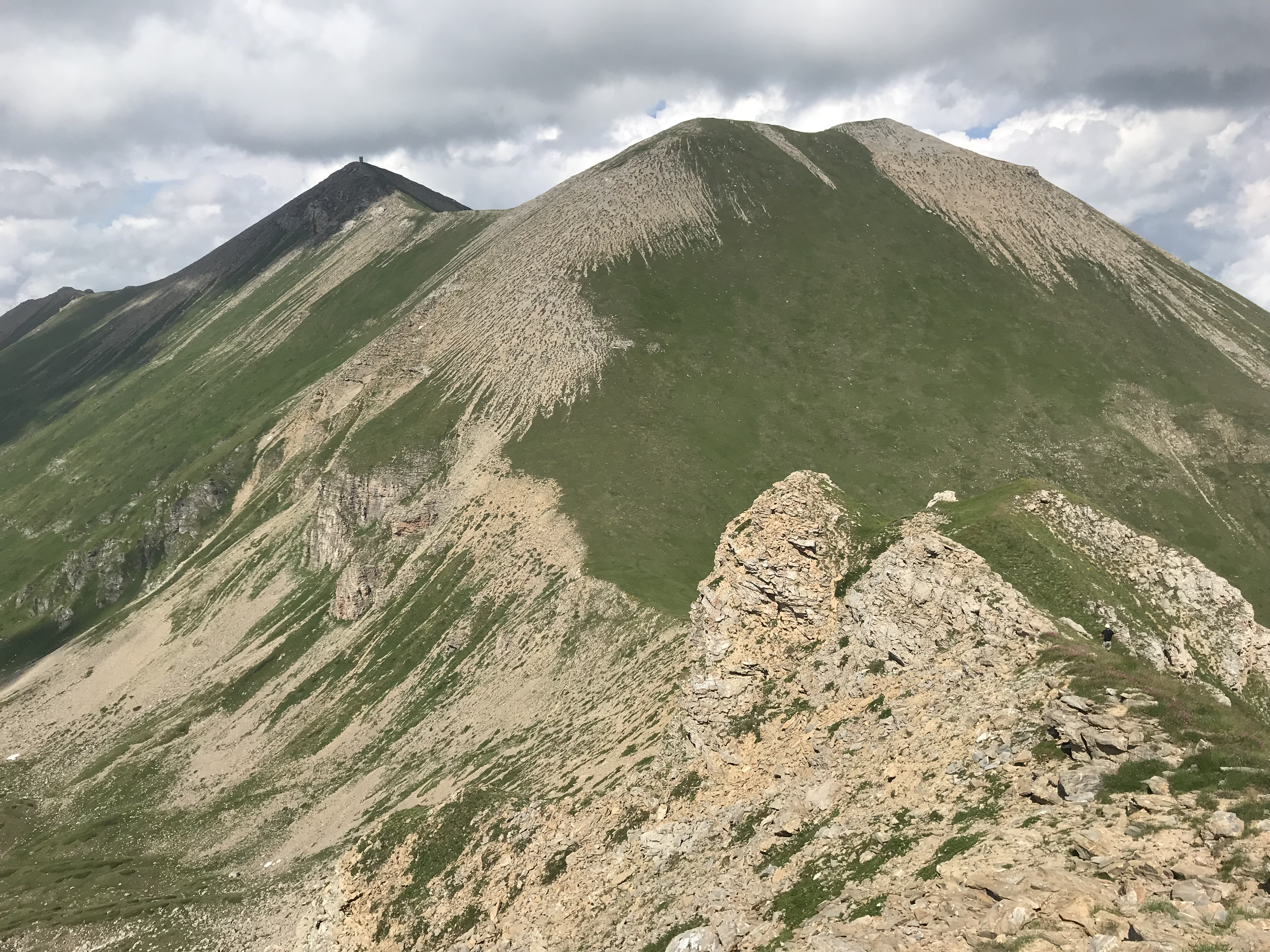
- Titov Vrv (back) and Small Turk (front), the tallest peaks of Šar Mountains

Highest point
- Peak: Titov Vrv, North Macedonia
- Elevation: 2,748 m (9,016 ft)

Naming
- Native name: Шар Планина (Macedonian); Шар-планина / Šar-planina (Serbian); Malet e Sharrit (Albanian)

Geography
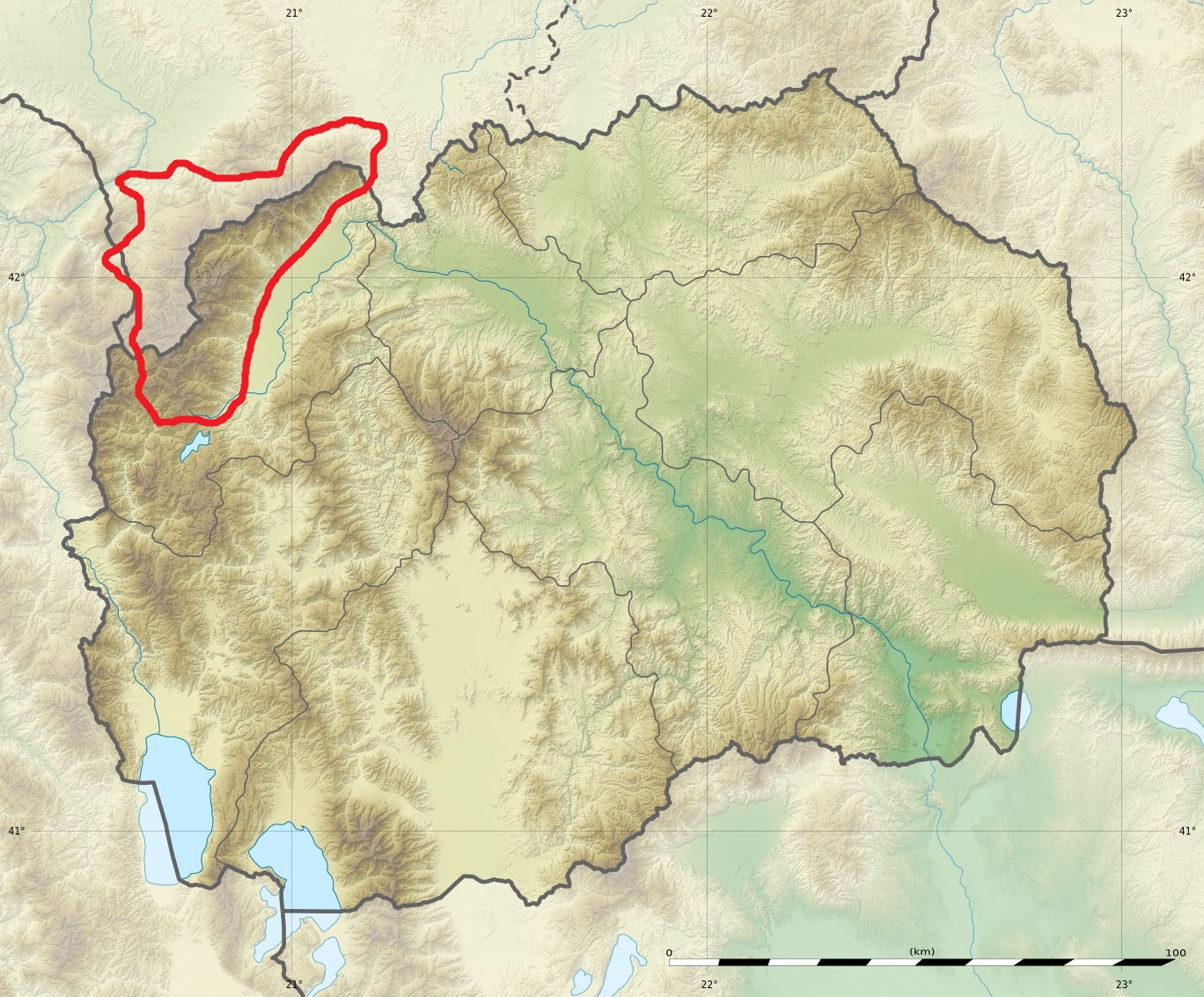
- Location: Kukës and Dibër Counties – Albania Ferizaj and Prizren Districts – Kosovo Polog Valley – North Macedonia
- Countries: Albania; Kosovo; North Macedonia
- Range coordinates: 42°00′00″N 20°44′00″E

The Šar Mountains (Macedonian: Шар Планина, romanized: Šar Planina; Serbian: Шар-планина / Šar-planina; colloquially also Šara, Cyrillic: Шара) or Sharr Mountains (Albanian: Malet e Sharrit, pronounced [malɛt ɛ ʃarit]) is a mountain range in Southeast Europe, extending into several countries from southern Kosovo, to northwestern North Macedonia, to northeastern Albania. The sections in Kosovo (Sharr Mountains National Park) and North Macedonia (Šar Planina National Park) are national parks. Rugged and barren, the mountains are among the highest in the Balkans, with 30 peaks higher than 2,500 m (8,202 ft).

== Etymology ==
In antiquity, the mountains were known as Scardus, Scodrus, or Scordus (το Σκάρδον ὂρος in Polybius and Ptolemy). It is considered of Indo-European origin (cf. Lithuanian: skardús 'steep'), and has been compared to the toponym Scardona and to the tribal name Scordisci (with Scardus featuring the Illyrian vocalism /a/).

The theory according to which the modern Sharr/Šar represents an evolution of the ancient name Scardus through Albanian sound changes is untenable on the basis of current historical-linguistic research. Sharr/Šar rather can be traced to Albanian: sharrë meaning 'saw', denoting the jagged peaks and 'saw-toothed ridge'. In the early 16th century, it was recorded that the mountain was called "Catena Mundi" (Latin for "the chains of the world").

Sometimes the range is called "Carska Planina" (Cyrillic: Царска Планина, "Tsar's Mountain"), as a reference to the capitals (Prizren and Skopje), courts (Nerodimlje, Pauni, Svrčin, etc.) and monasteries (monastery of the Holy Archangels) of the Serbian Empire located in the region. In the medieval period, Serbs called the mountain "Mlečni" (Cyrillic: Млечни), because of the major milk production on the mountain and the vast herds of cattle, goats and sheep. In the golden bull issued by Emperor Dušan on 20 September 1349, he says: "I also bequest all of mine estates and areas around the Mlečni Mountain ("Milk Mountain"), the Durlev estates and all the metochions and all the wealth and treasure of that region". The bull is kept in the Dubrovnik Archive.

== Borders ==
The mountain borders extend from the city of Prizren, following the two rivers of the Prizren Bistrica and the Lepenac. In the east, it passes by the town of Kaçanik through the Kaçanik Gorge and into North Macedonia via the Polog Valley. The border passes near the Vardar spring called Vrutok and enters near the Mavrovo Valley. There the Radika river separates the mountain massif from the higher Mount Korab. After that, the border is mounting, reaching the point of junction of three state borders: Kosovo, North Macedonia and Albania. The border now follows the road to the small, mountainous, town of Restelicë, the rivers of Globocica, Plava and the White Drin and finally reaches the city of Prizren.

== Geographical characteristics ==
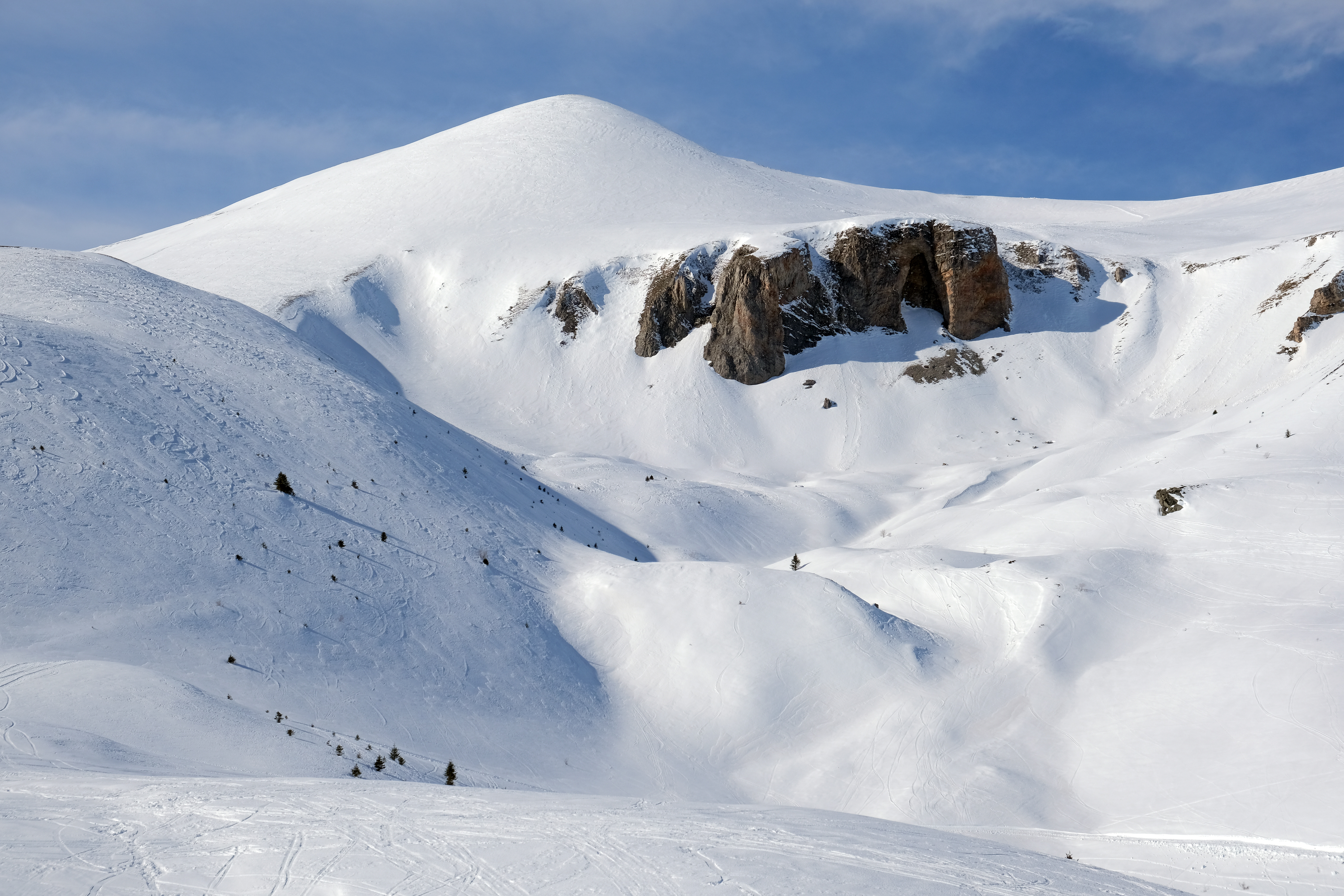
Anteni peak (2 531m), Šar Mountains, North Macedonia

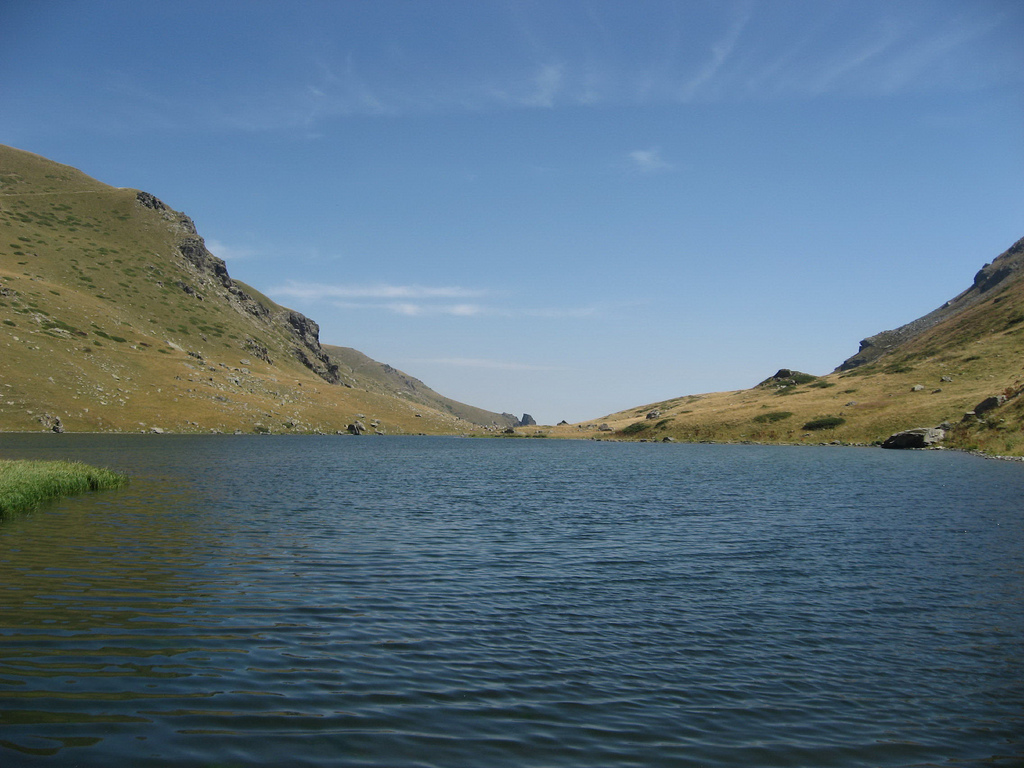
Bogovinje Lake

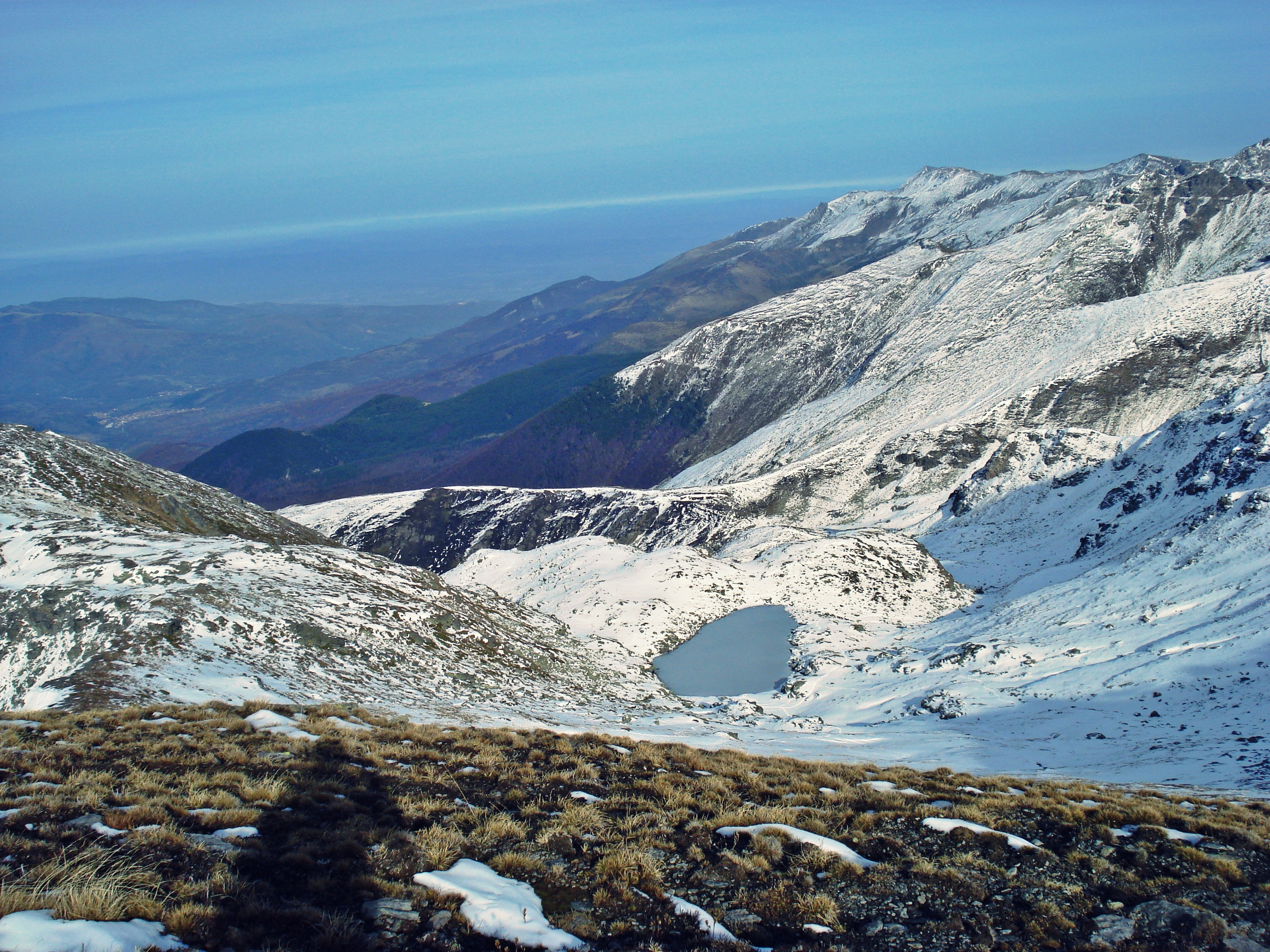
Konjushka lake is the highest lake in this mountain chain at an altitude of 2,410 m (7,910 ft).

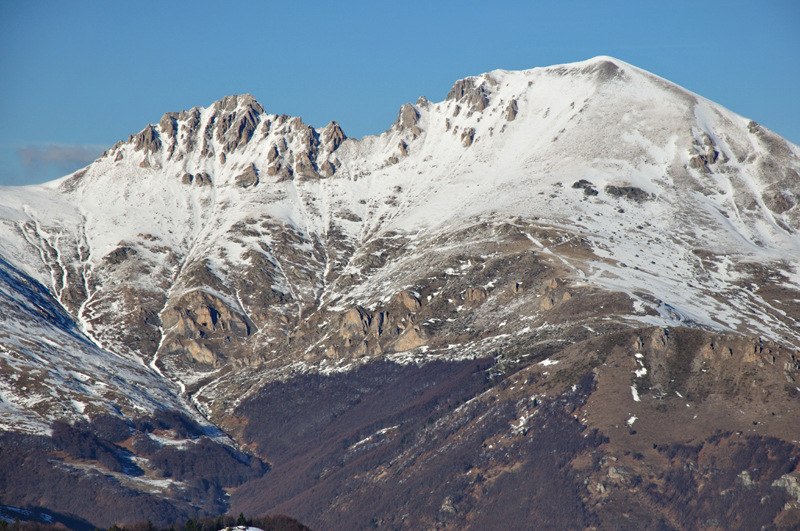
Šar Mountains peak Kobilica

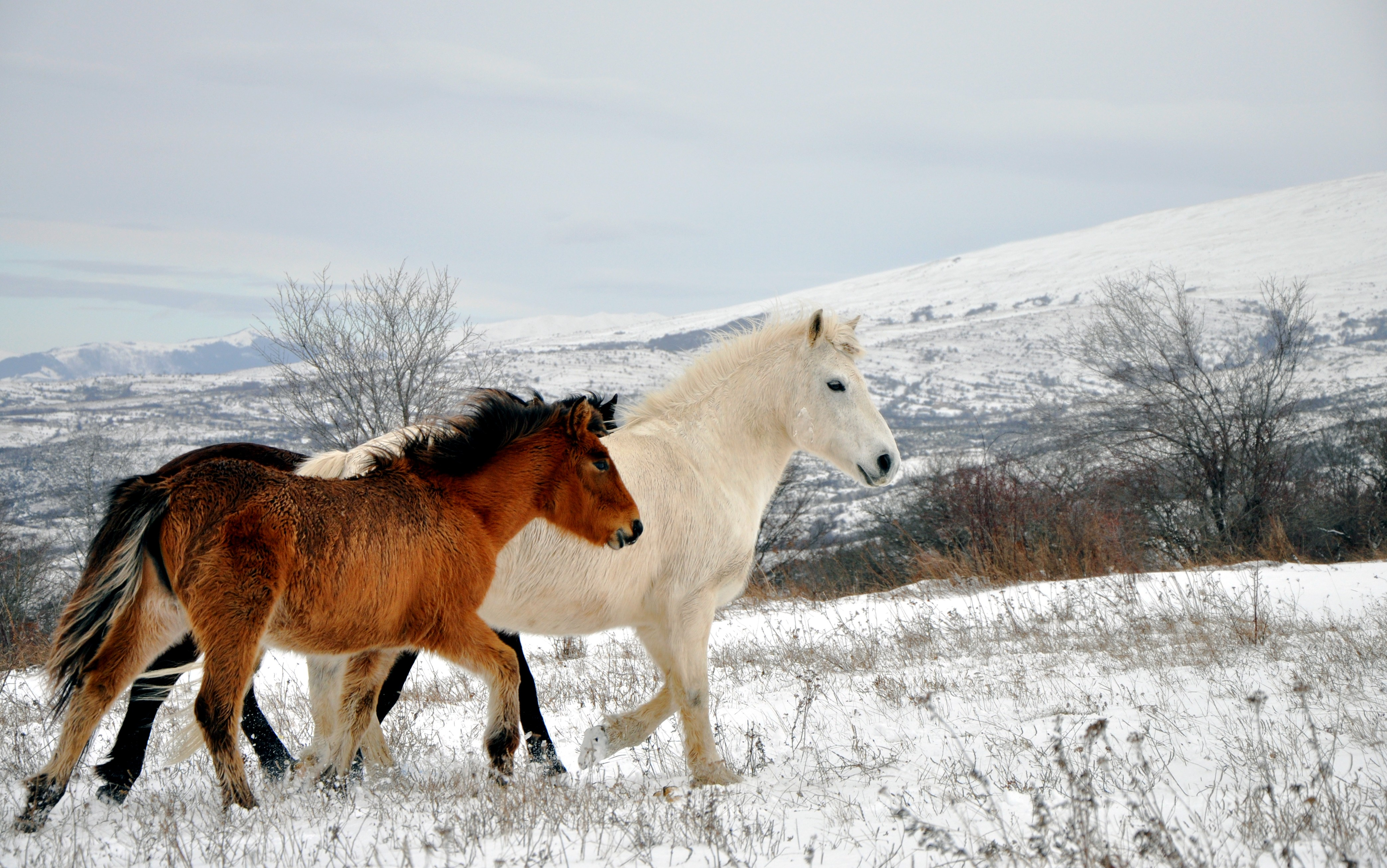
Wild horses spotted near Dragash at Kosovo's Sharr Mountains National Park

The Šar Mountains have a total area of 1,600 km^{2}. 56,25% of that area is in North Macedonia, 43.12% in Kosovo, and 0,63% in Albania. There are three plains: Sirinić, Vraca and Rudoka. The system is about 80 km (50 mi) long and 10–20 km (6–12 mi) wide.

The mountain massif was formed in the Tertiary Period. The peaks are covered with ice and snow.

It includes several high peaks:

- Titov Vrv (2,747 m or 9,012 ft)
- Mal Turčin (2,707 m or 8,881 ft)
- Bakardan (2,704 m or 8,871 ft)
- Borislavec (2,675 m or 8,776 ft)
- Velika Rudoka (2,660 m or 8,727 ft) – the highest mountain of Kosovo, and also the highest mountain of Serbia according to the view held by the government of Serbia.
- Peskovi – east summit (2,651 m or 8,698 ft)
- Peskovi – west summit (2,641 m or 8,665 ft)
- Mala Rudoka (2,629 m or 8,625 ft)
- Džini Beg (2,610 m or 8,563 ft)
- Ezerski Vrv (2,604 m or 8,543 ft)
- Karabunar (2,600 m or 8,530 ft)
- Trpeznica (2,590 m or 8,497 ft)
- Maja e zezë (2,585 m or 8,481 ft)
- Golema Vraca (2,582 m or 8,471 ft)
- Konjushka (2,571 m or 8,435 ft)
- Guzhbaba (2,582 m or 8,471 ft)
- Isa Aga (2,555 m or 8,383 ft)
- Black Peak (2,536 m or 8,320 ft)
- Kobilica (2,528 m or 8,294 ft)
- Piribeg (2,524 m or 8,281 ft)
- Ljuboten (2,498 m or 8,196 ft)
- Maja Livadh (2,497 m or 8,192 ft)
- Maja e Begut (2,493 m or 8,179 ft)
- Zallina (2,493 m or 8,179 ft)
- Mala Vraca (2,483 m or 8,146 ft)
- Guri i Çarë (2,466 m or 8,091 ft)
- Kleç (2,414 m or 7,920 ft)
- Kara Nikolla (2,409 m or 7,904 ft)
- Maja Koritnik (2,393 m or 7,851 ft)
- Tumba Peak (2,346 m or 7,697 ft)
- Bardhalevë (2,334 m (7,657 ft))
- Kulla Peak (2,314 m (7,592 ft))
- Oshlak (2,212 m (7,257 ft))
- Gemitash (2,183 m or 7,162 ft)
- Kallabak (2,174 m or 7,133 ft)
- Kamenkullë (2,117 m or 6,946 ft)
- Ksulje e Priftit Peak (2,092 m or 6,864 ft) – tripoint
- Pashallora (2,092 m (6,864 ft))

There are 30 peaks higher than 2,500 m (8,200 ft) and 70 above the 2,000 m (6,600 ft).

The Šar Mountains extend to Mount Korab (2,764 m or 9,068 ft) in the southwest, and pass into northeastern Albania with very small part (0.63% of the entire length).

Vegetation on the mountains includes crops up to around 1,000 m (3,281 ft), forests up to 1,700 m (5,577 ft), and above that lie high pastures which encompass around 550 km^{2} (212 sq mi). The Šar Mountains are the largest compact area covered with pastures on the European continent. The dog breed Šarplaninac comes from this area.

The snowy peaks of the Šar Mountains are depicted on the coat of arms of the city of Skopje, which in turn is incorporated in the city's flag.

== History ==
The remains of the Shiroka complex are located near Mushtishtë. The complex originates from the period between the 10th and the 7th century BC, but also has medieval remnants. In Roman period, the mountain was a tripoint between the provinces of Dalmatia, Moesia and Macedonia. The route of an ancient road crossed the Scardus from 169 BC. The road was later named Velji ("Great") or Prizren road. Lisinski road was built. Remnants of the fort on the Kradište hill, near Prizren, dates from the 2nd to the 6th century and testifies the change of civilizations in this region: it started in the pre-Roman period, then became a Roman town and later a Byzantine one. Locality of Ravna Gora, predating the 6th century, where Slavs later cremated their dead, is situated in the area. Medieval military complex of Petrič Fortress, which consists of two fortresses, Little Petrič and Great Petrič, is also preserved. Remains of the Višegrad Fort, older part of the Prizren Fortress, are located in the gorge of the Bistrica river. When King Milutin donated lands to the Our Lady of Ljeviš church, he also donated the Višegrad Fort to serve as an Prizren's defence outpost. Emperor Dušan later expanded the fort to the river and built his endowment, the Monastery of the Holy Archangels.

There are 45 Serbian Orthodox monasteries on the slopes of the mountain, dating from the 12th to the 16th century. Additional 32 monasteries were damaged or demolished during the NATO bombing of Serbia in 1999 and in the later years. Church of the Dormition of the Mother of God in the village of Gotovuša in Sirinićka Župa was built in 16th century. It was destroyed later and rebuilt in the second half of the 19th century. During the works in churchyard in the 2010s a floor mosaic was discovered from the much older church from the Byzantine period.

== Šar Mountains in Kosovo ==
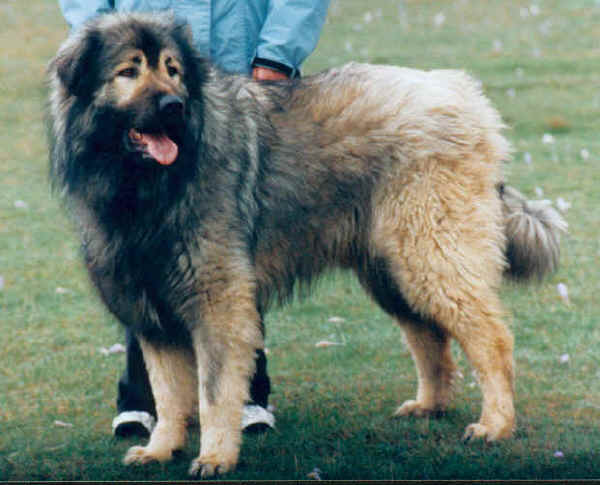
Šarplaninac, a dog breed of the livestock guardian type named after the Šar Mountains

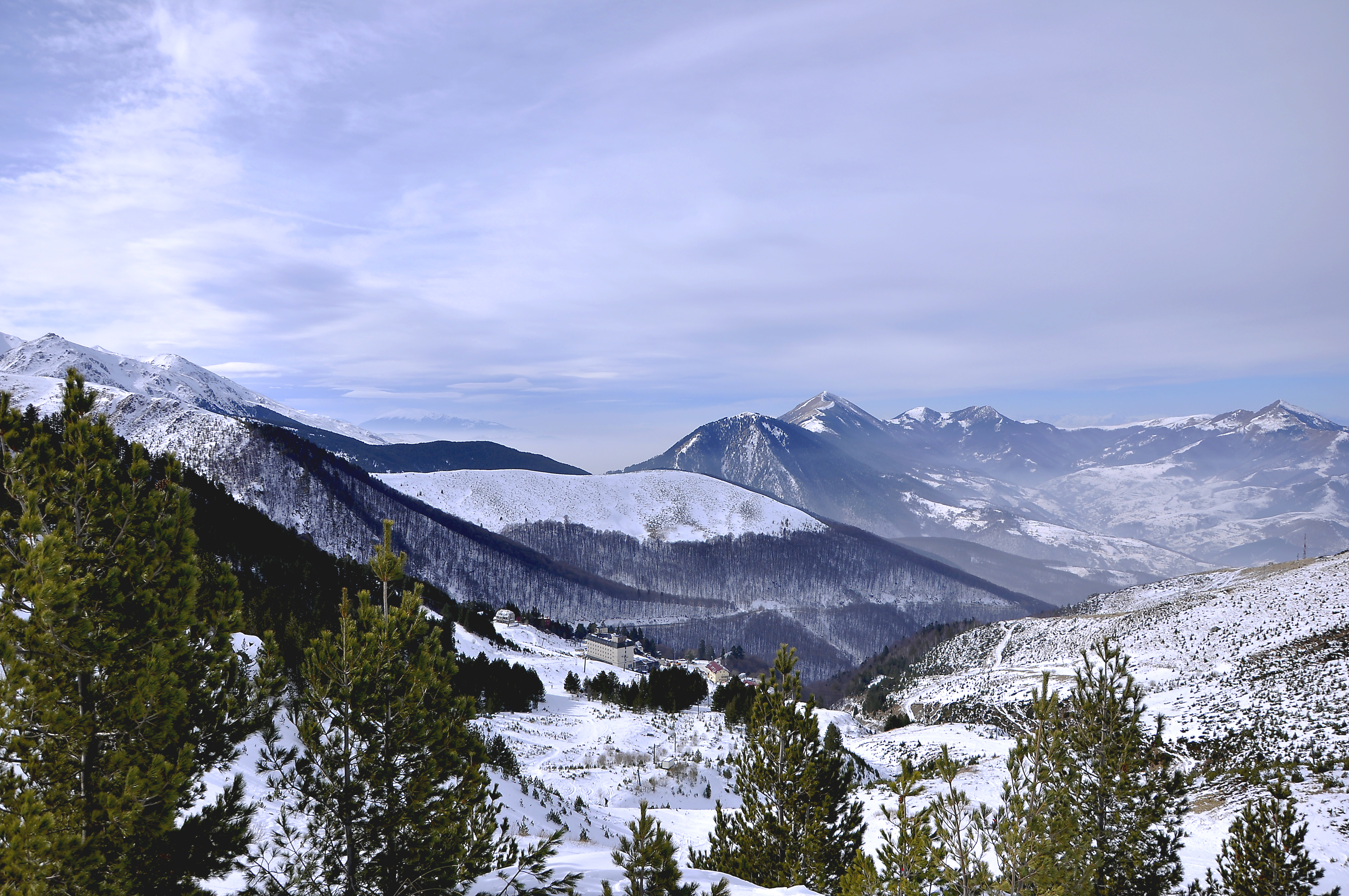
Brezovica ski resort

The Šar Mountains are located in the south and south-east of Kosovo, where 43.12% of the range is located. Many alpine and glacial mountain lakes are found on the Kosovar part of the Šar Mountains, especially south of the town of Dragash, the area of Shutman and the region north of Vraca. The Brezovica ski resort, with an elevation of 900 m (2,953 ft) to 2,524 m (8,281 ft) above sea level, is located north-east of the mountains.

The mountain range in Kosovo is divided into three main zones: The zone of Ljuboten and Brezovica, the central zone of Prizren and the zone of Opoja and Gora.

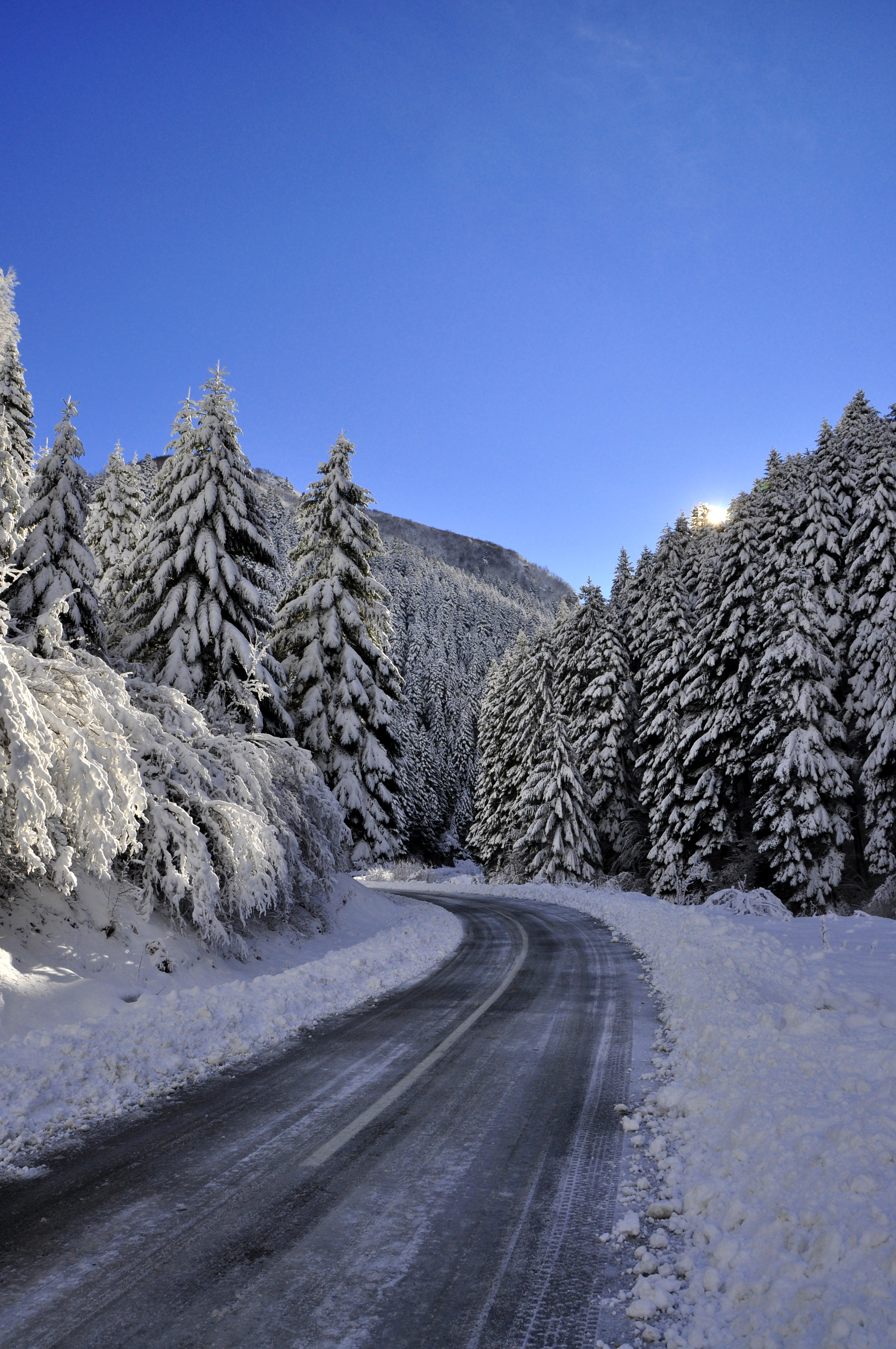
Fir forest in Dragash, Kosovo

The mountains border the Kosovo Plain to the north-east and the Metohia Valley in the northwest. Kosovo consists of the most eastern tip and the most northern part of the mountain ridge.

The Ljuboten peak and the mountain of Skopska Crna Gora create the Kaçanik Gorge in Kosovo. The Šar Mountains are split from the Nerodimka Mountain by the Sirinić Valley. The Šar National Park is located in Kosovo. Villages and towns that are found near the mountain are:

- Prizren, largest city located at the foot of the mountains.
- Kaçanik
- Dragash
- Brezovica
- Štrpce

Lakes in the Kosovo part of the Šar Mountains are:

- Jazhincë Lake
- Small Jazhincë Lake
- Shutman Lake
- Lower Defsko Lake
- Livadh Lake
- Black Vir Lake
- Donji Vir Lake
- Blateško Lake
- Upper Defsko Lake
- Dinivodno Lake

In total, there are 70 glacial lakes on the Šar Mountains.

=== Sharr Mountains National Park in Kosovo ===
Sharr Mountains National Park
- IUCN category II (national park)
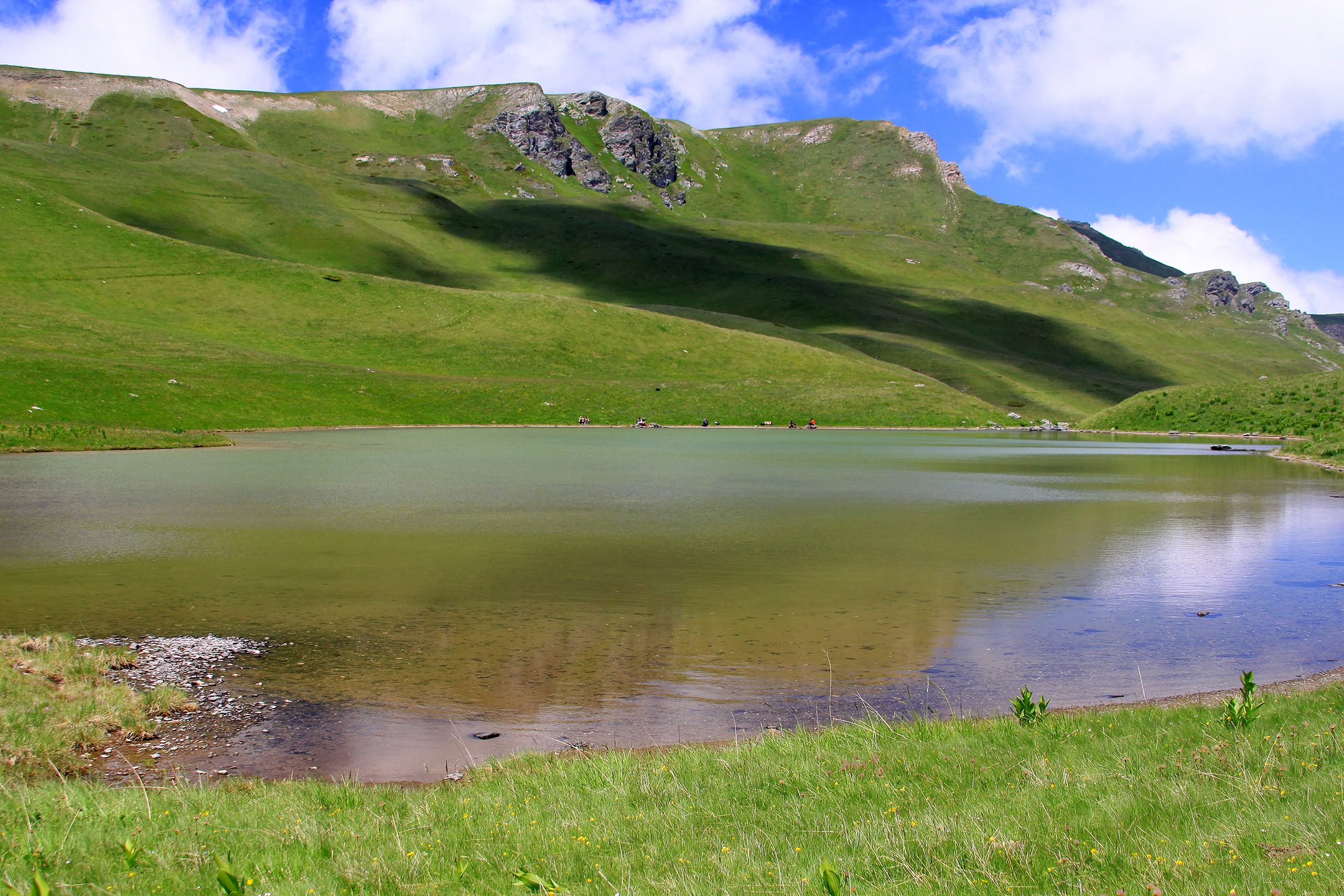
- Shutman Lake
- Interactive map of Sharr Mountains National Park
- Area: 534.69 km^{2} (206.44 sq mi)
- Established: 1986

==== History ====
Sharr Mountains National Park is a national park of Kosovo and covers an area of 534.69 km^{2} (206 sq mi) on the northern slopes of the Šar Mountains as well as the mountains of Oshlak and Jezercë. The National Park "Šar-Planina Mt." was proclaimed in 1986 within the temporary boundaries of 390.00 km^{2} (150.58 sq mi), and opened in 1995. The final boundaries of the Park were expanded in 2012 to cover an area of 534.69 km^{2} (206.44 sq mi).

==== Geography ====
The park occupies the northwest sections of the mountain's main massif, including the highest peak, Bistra, an spreads over the sections of Prevalla, Oshlak, Ostrovica and Kodža Balkan. The park encompasses several different types of topographic relief: glacial (cirques, moraines and glacial lakes), periglacial (snow cirques, sliding blocks, "tundra mosaic" type of micro-shapes in the deposits of silt), karstic and fluvial. There are numerous rivers, springs, creeks, bogs and lakes.

==== Plant life ====
In total, there are 1,800 plant species. The mountain is inhabited by 175 strictly protected plant species, 247 Balkan endemites and 18 plants which can be found only on Šar Mountains. The park includes the endemic relict Macedonian Pine and white-bark pine, as well as the mugo pine and Alpine rose. Other perennial plants include King Alexander's yarrow (Achillea alexandri-regis), Nikolić's silene (Heliosperma nikolicii), Bornmuellera dieckii, Šar carnation (Dianthus scardicus Wettst.), Doerfler's cinquefoils and Macedonian meadow saffron (Colhicum macedonicum). One of the relic species is Natalie's ramonda. It went extinct from the most of Europe during the last ice age and today grows as an endemic species in several gorges in Serbia, North Macedonia and Greece. It has been chosen as the Serbian symbol for the Armistice Day.

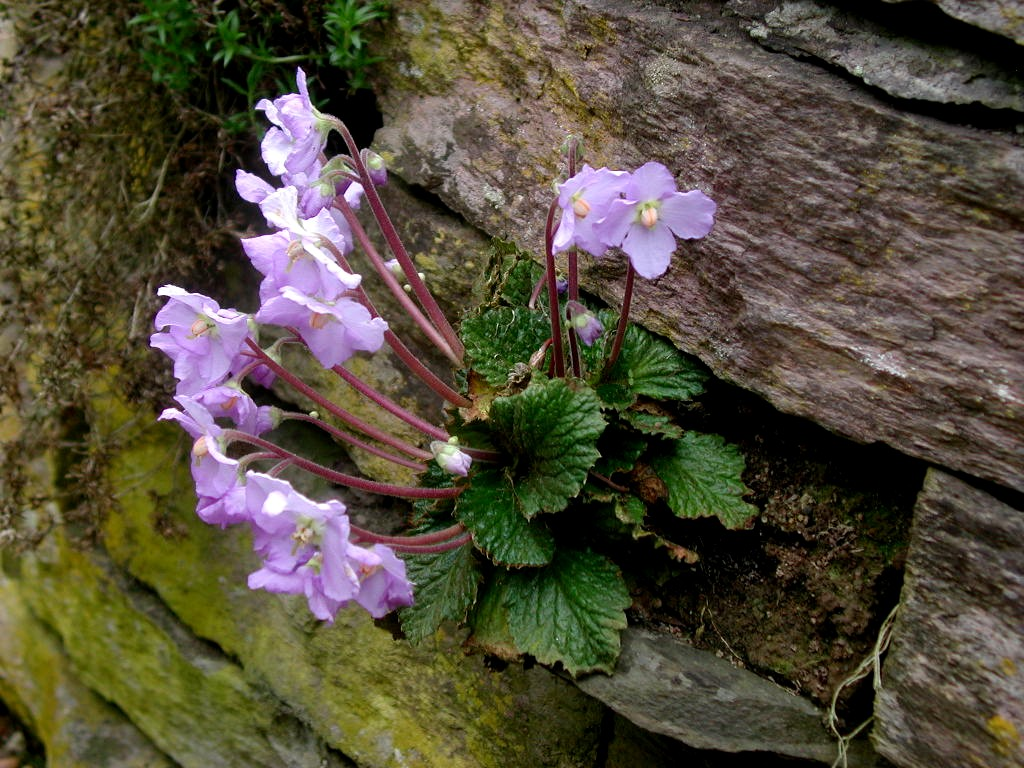
Ramonda nathaliae

==== Animal life ====
Rusenica locality on the mountain has been in the first level of protection, as the strict reserve of nature, since 1955. It is one of the rare habitats of Balkan lynx, the largest European cat. It is estimated that on the entire Balkans there are no more than 100 specimens. European pond turtle and Hermann's tortoise, only two European species of freshwater turtles, live on the mountain. There are 147 butterfly species (excluding moths), 45 amphibians and reptilians and 37 mammalian species. Other animals include bear, chamois, wolf, roe deer, wild boar and other species including many bird species. The national park contains 720 chamois while the Opoja and Gora region contains 600 chamois. The National Park is administered by the Ministry of Environment and Spatial Planning (MESP).

== See also ==
- List of mountains in Albania
- List of mountains in Kosovo
- List of mountains in North Macedonia

== Bibliography ==
=== Alpinism ===
- Poljak, Željko (February 1959). "Šar-planina". Kazalo za "Hrvatski planinar" i "Naše planine" 1898—1958 (PDF). Naše planine (in Croatian). Vol. XI. p. 27. ISSN 0354-0650.

=== Biology ===
- Šašić, Martina; Nahirnić, Ana; Tarmann, Gerhard M. (2016-12-31). "Zygaenidae (Lepidoptera) in the Lepidoptera collections of the Croatian Natural History Museum". Natura Croatica: Periodicum Musei Historiae Naturalis Croatici. 25 (2): 233–248. doi:10.20302/NC.2016.25.19. eISSN 1848-7386.
