= Kulla Peak =

Mountain in Kosovo and North Macedonia

Kulla
- Location within Kosovo

Highest point
- Elevation: 2,314 m (7,592 ft)
- Coordinates: 42°11′37″N 21°5′18″E

Geography
- Location: Kosovo and North Macedonia
- Parent range: Sharr Mountains

Geology
- Mountain type: Fold mountain

Kulla Peak (Albanian: Maja e Kullës) is a mountain peak in the border between Kosovo and North Macedonia. The peak is part of the Sharr Mountains. Kulla has an altitude of 2,314 m (7,592 ft) and it is part of the Sharr Mountains National Park.

== See also ==
- List of mountains in Kosovo
- National parks of Kosovo
