= Lower Defsko Lake =

Lake in Kosovo

== Geography ==
Lower Defsko Lake
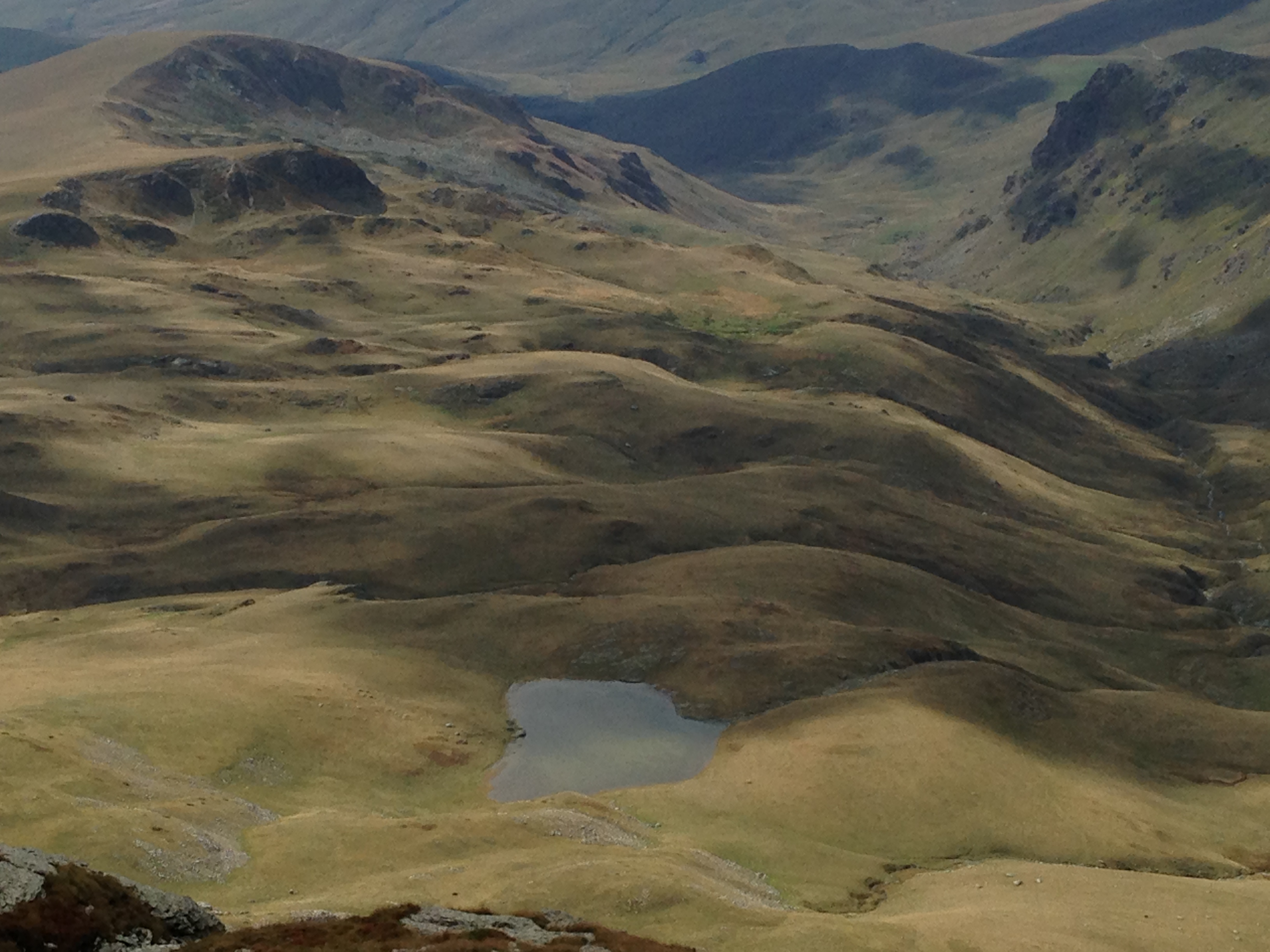
- Lower Defsko Lake seen from Small Vraca peak

- Location within Kosovo Location within Europe
- Interactive map of Lower Defsko Lake
- Location: Šar Mountains
- Coordinates: 41°53′12.9″N 20°43′22.4″E
- Basin countries: Kosovo
- Surface elevation: 2,112 m (6,929 ft)

Lower Defsko Lake (Albanian: Liqeni i Ulët i Defskos, Serbian: Доње дефско језеро / Donje defsko jezero) is a large mountain lake in Kosovo. Lower Defsko Lake is located in the Kosovan side of the Šar Mountains under the slopes of the Vraca mountain. It is very near the origin of the Radika river which originates in Kosovo. This lake is on an elevation of 2,112 m (6,929 ft) above sea level.

== See also ==
- Upper Defsko Lake
- List of lakes of Kosovo
