= Gemitash =

Coordinates: 41.9075°N 20.6808333°E

Gemitash (Serbian Cyrillic: Гемиташ, Albanian: Gemitash) is a mountain in Kosovo, located in the Šar Mountains. It reaches a height of 2,183 metres (7,162 ft). It is surrounded by many lakes and is near the village of Restelica.
