= Karanikolica =

Mountain in Kosovo and North Macedonia

Coordinates: 42.0836111°N 20.7941667°E

Karanikolica (Macedonian and Serbian Cyrillic: Караниколица, Albanian: Kara Nikolla) is a mountain peak in Kosovo and North Macedonia. The peak is found in the Šar Mountains. It's 2,409 m (7,904 ft) high and is just one of the peaks over 2,000 m (6,562 ft) which is found along the ridge of the Šar Mountains. Two mountain lakes are found under Karanikolica's peak.

The first known ski-descent of Karanikolica was on 6 February 2016. The group was led by local mountain guides Kostantin Ciriviri and Jovan Bozinoski, while the rest of the party was made up of two female ski mountaineers from Norway and Slovakia, and a male splitboarder from the United Kingdom.
