= Jazhincë Lake =

Glacial lake in Kosovo

- Liqeni Jazhincës (Albanian); Veliko Jažinačko jezero (Serbian)
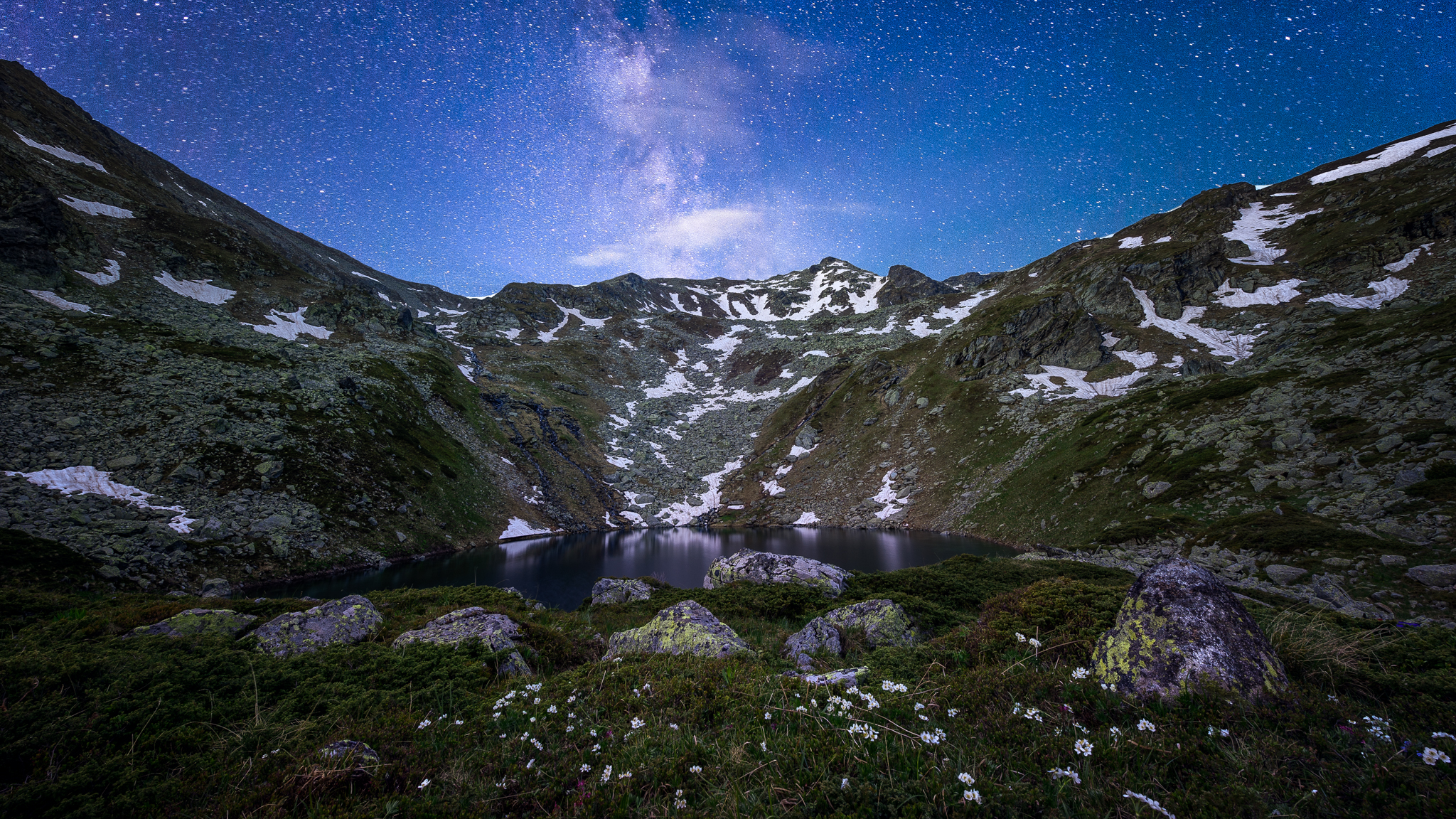
- Jazhincë Lake, with Milky Way Galaxy background.

- Location within Kosovo Location within Europe
- Interactive map of Jazhincë Lake
- Location: Sharr Mountains
- Coordinates: 42°09′07″N 20°59′39″E
- Lake type: Glacial lake
- Basin countries: Kosovo
- Max. length: 125 m (410 ft)
- Max. width: 90 m (300 ft)
- Surface area: 8,500 m^{2} (91,000 sq ft)
- Average depth: 5 m (16 ft)
- Max. depth: 12 m (39 ft)
- Water volume: 500 m^{3} (18,000 cu ft)
- Surface elevation: 2,180 m (7,150 ft)

Jazhincë Lake is a mountain lake in Kosovo, found in the eastern part of the Sharr Mountains. The lake is 2,180 m (7,152 ft) above sea level, just under the peak of Peskovi, which reaches a height of 2,651 m (8,698 ft). Its maximum length is 125 m (410 ft) and its maximum width is 90 m (295 ft). On some sides the lake is surrounded by large rocks which makes it ideal for animals to hide or live in.

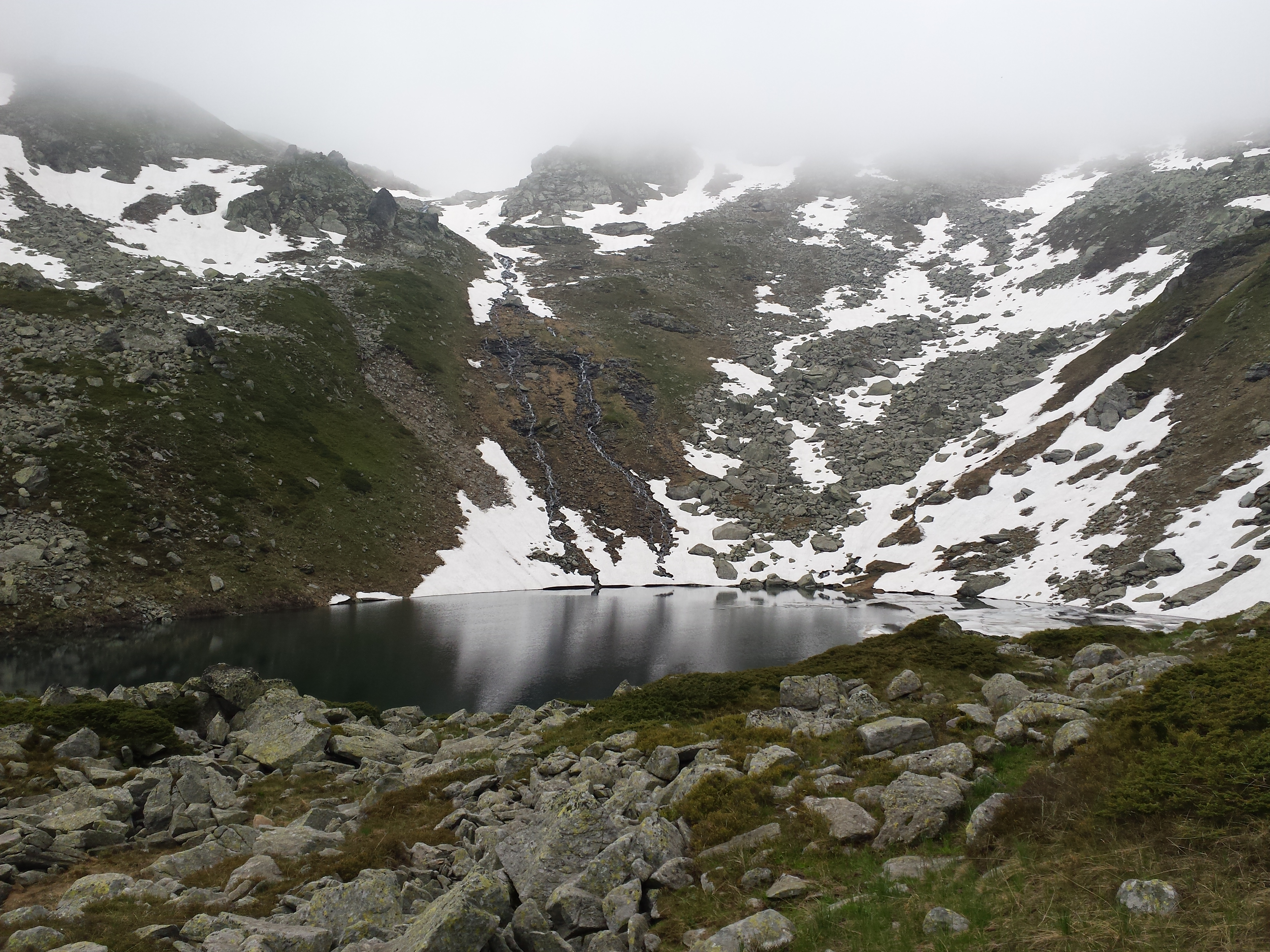
Jazhincë Lake in winter.

== See also ==
- List of lakes of Kosovo
- Small Jazhincë Lake
