= Upper Defsko Lake =

Lake in Kosovo

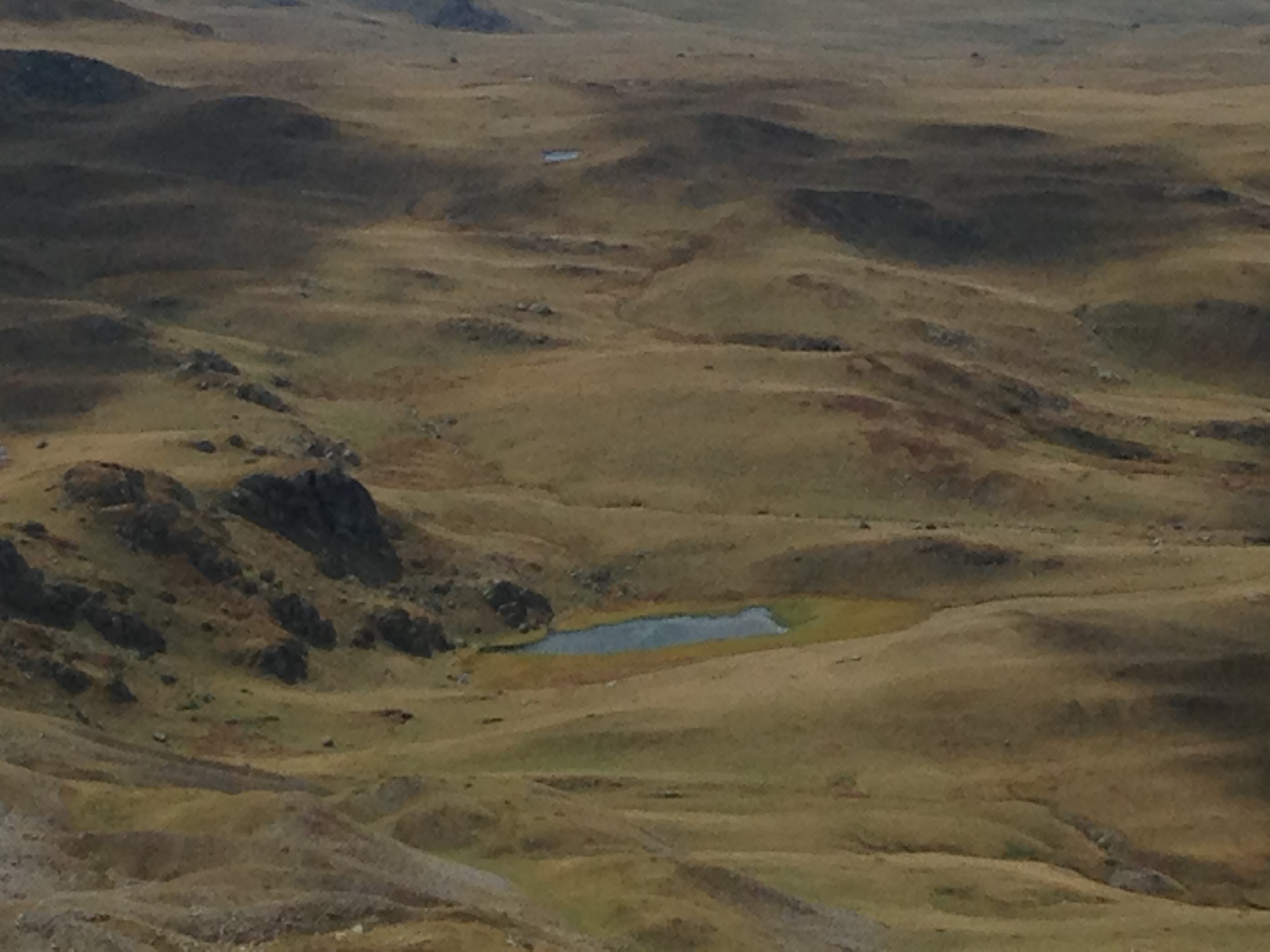
- Upper Defsko Lake seen from Small Vraca peak, almost drained in September

- Location within Kosovo Location within Europe
- Interactive map of Upper Defsko Lake
- Location: Šar Mountains
- Coordinates: 41°52′48″N 20°43′05″E
- Basin countries: Kosovo
- Surface elevation: 2,130 m (6,990 ft)

Upper Defsko Lake (Albanian: Liqeni i Epërm i Defskos, Serbian: Горње дефско језеро / Gornje defsko jezero) is a mountain lake situated in the Šar Mountains at an elevation of 2,130 m (6,988 ft) above sea level in Kosovo. A small stream originates from Upper Defsko Lake and flows south to join with the Radika river.

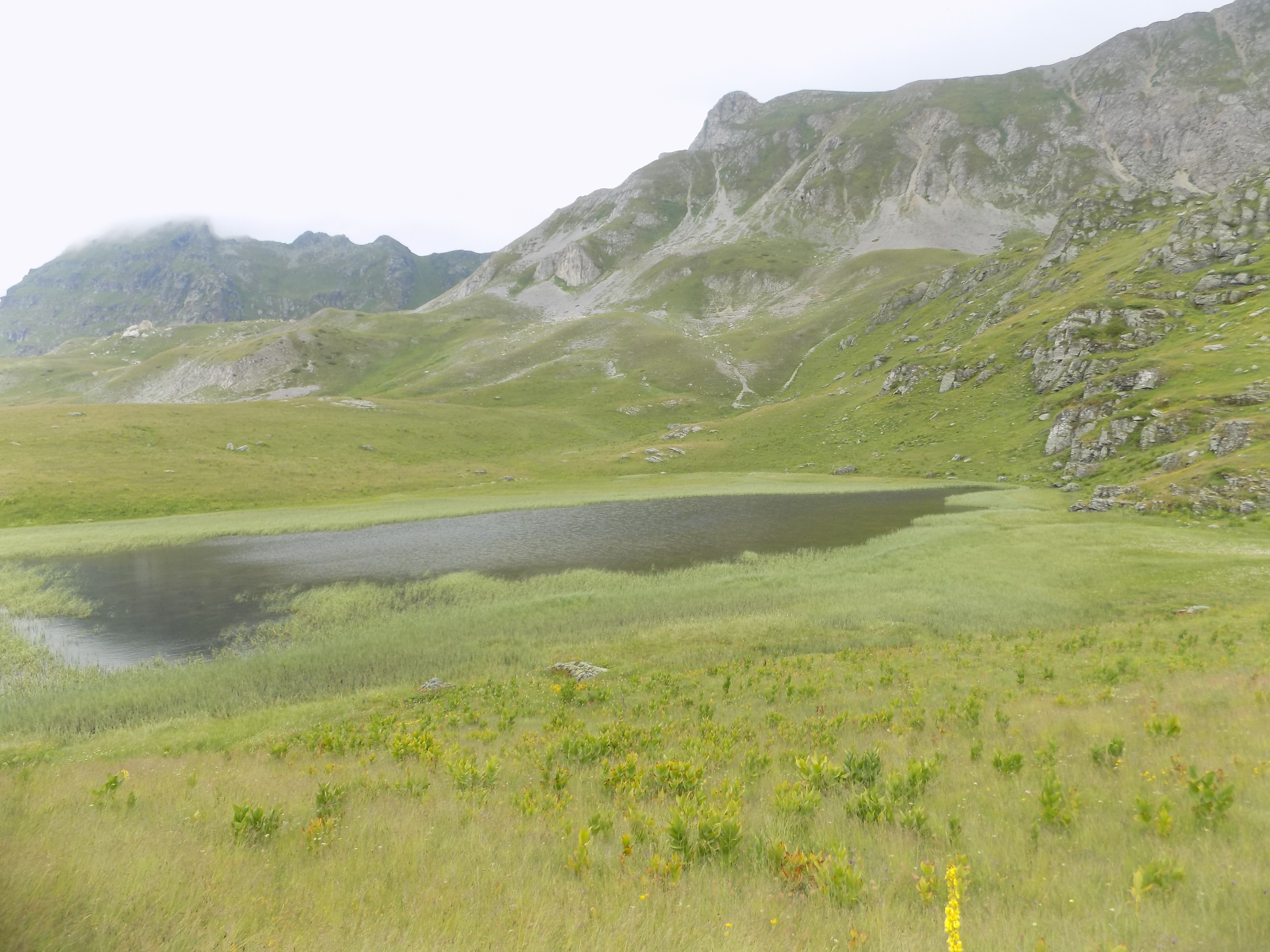
Water surface of the Defsko Lake

== See also ==
- List of lakes of Kosovo
- Lower Defsko Lake
