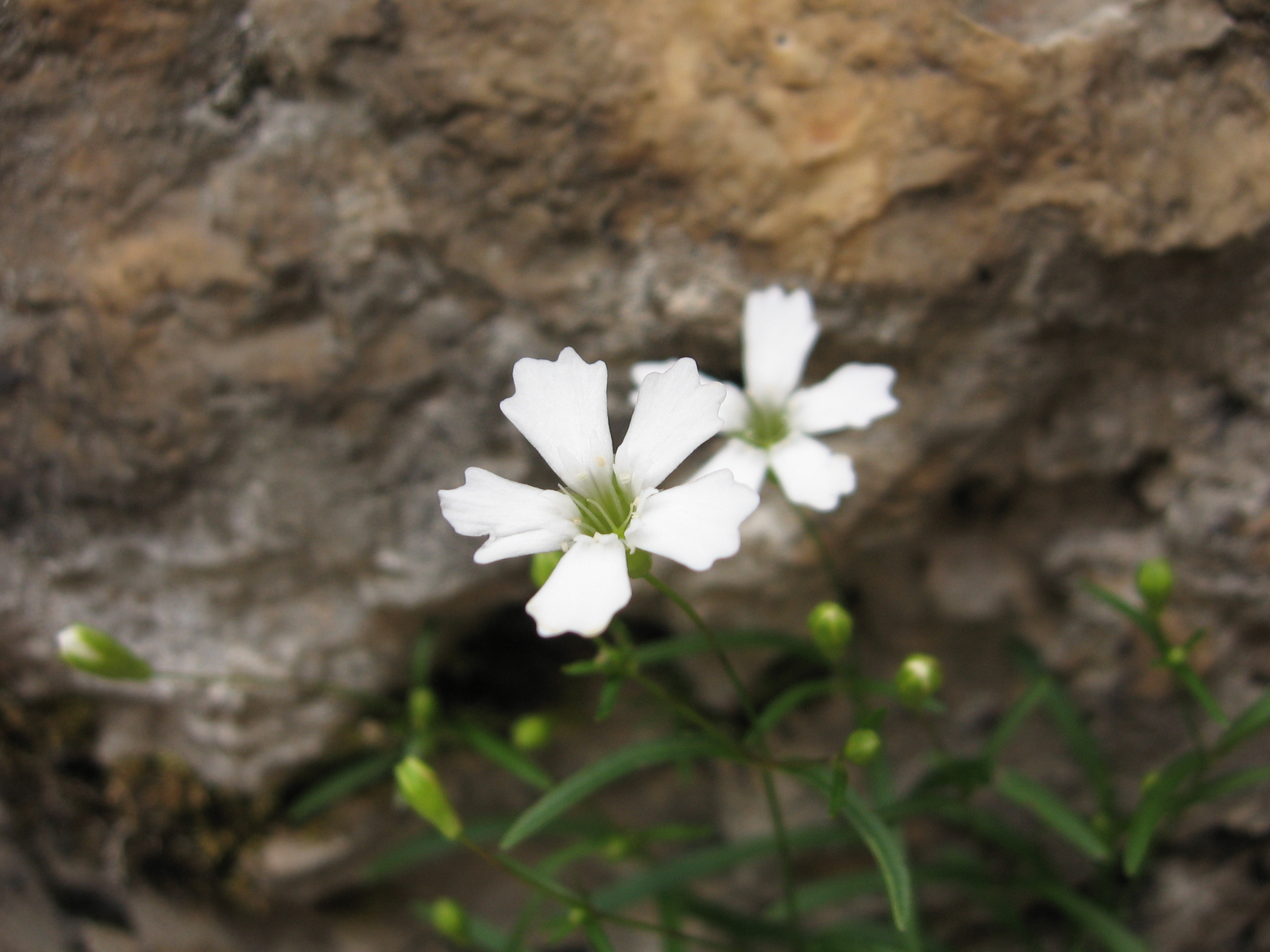

Scientific classification
- Kingdom: Plantae
- Clade: Tracheophytes
- Clade: Angiosperms
- Clade: Eudicots
- Order: Caryophyllales
- Family: Caryophyllaceae
- Genus: Heliosperma
- Species: H. pusillum

Binomial name
- Heliosperma pusillum (Waldst. & Kit.) Rchb.

= Heliosperma pusillum =

Species of flowering plant

Heliosperma pusillum is a species of flowering plants in the family Caryophyllaceae. It is native to mountain ranges of Western Europe. It's a species of plants with a complex evolutionary history characterized by repeated ecological divergence.
