= Trpeznica =

Mountain in Kosovo and North Macedonia

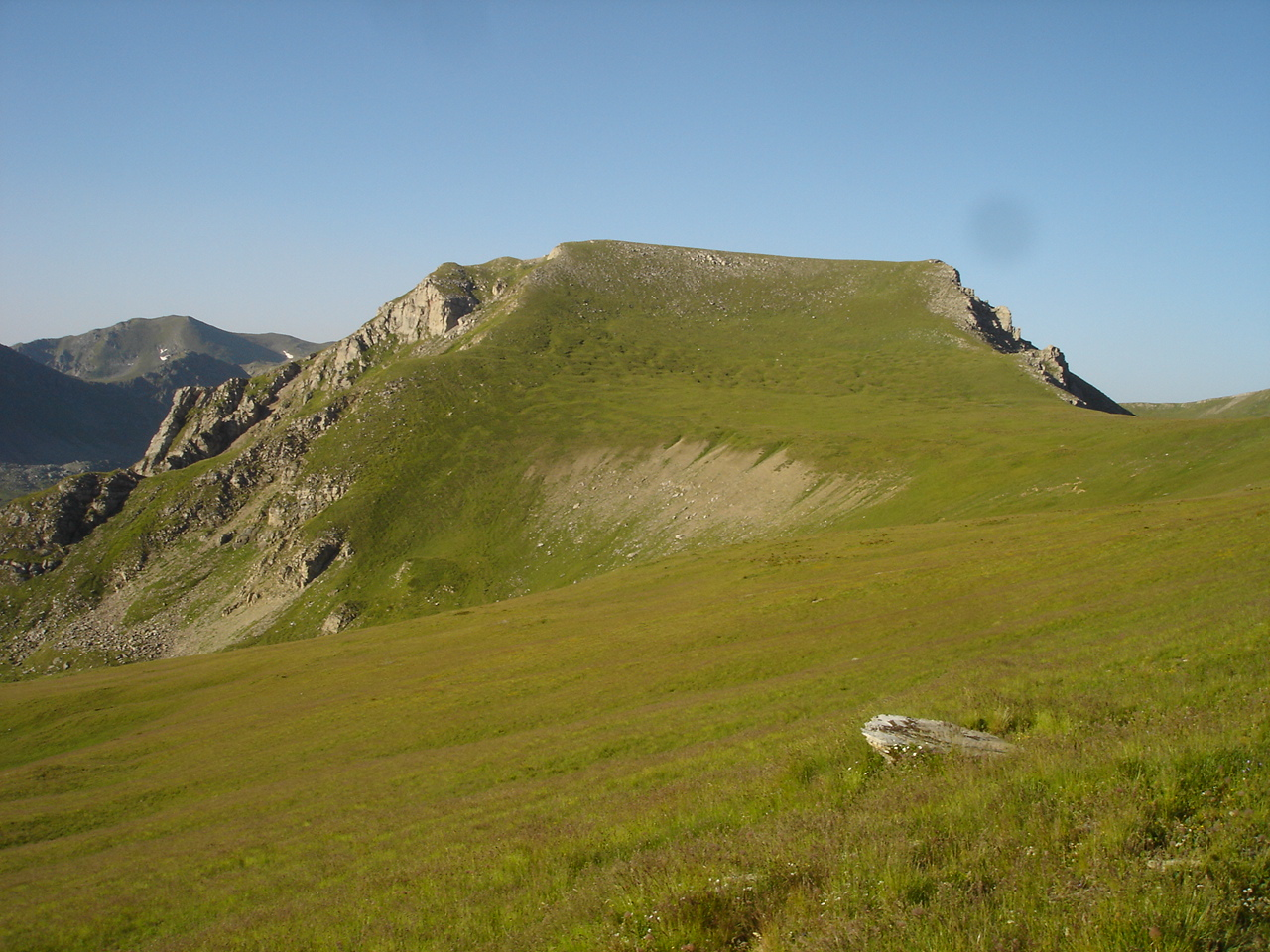

Highest point
- Elevation: 2,590 m (8,500 ft)
- Coordinates: 41°57′13″N 20°46′02″E

Geography
- Location within Kosovo
- Location: Kosovo^{[a]}
- Parent range: Šar Mountains

Trpeznica (Macedonian: Трпезница; Albanian: Tërpeznicë) is a mountain peak forming part of the Šar Mountains in Kosovo and North Macedonia. It reaches a height of 2,590 m (8,497 ft) and is located in the south of the mountain range close to the White Lake (Macedonian: Бело Езеро, romanized: Belo Ezero). The summit of Trpeznica is flat while its slopes are steep and sometimes rocky especially in the Kosovan side.
