= Velika Rudoka =

Highest peak of Kosovo

- Rudoka e Madhe
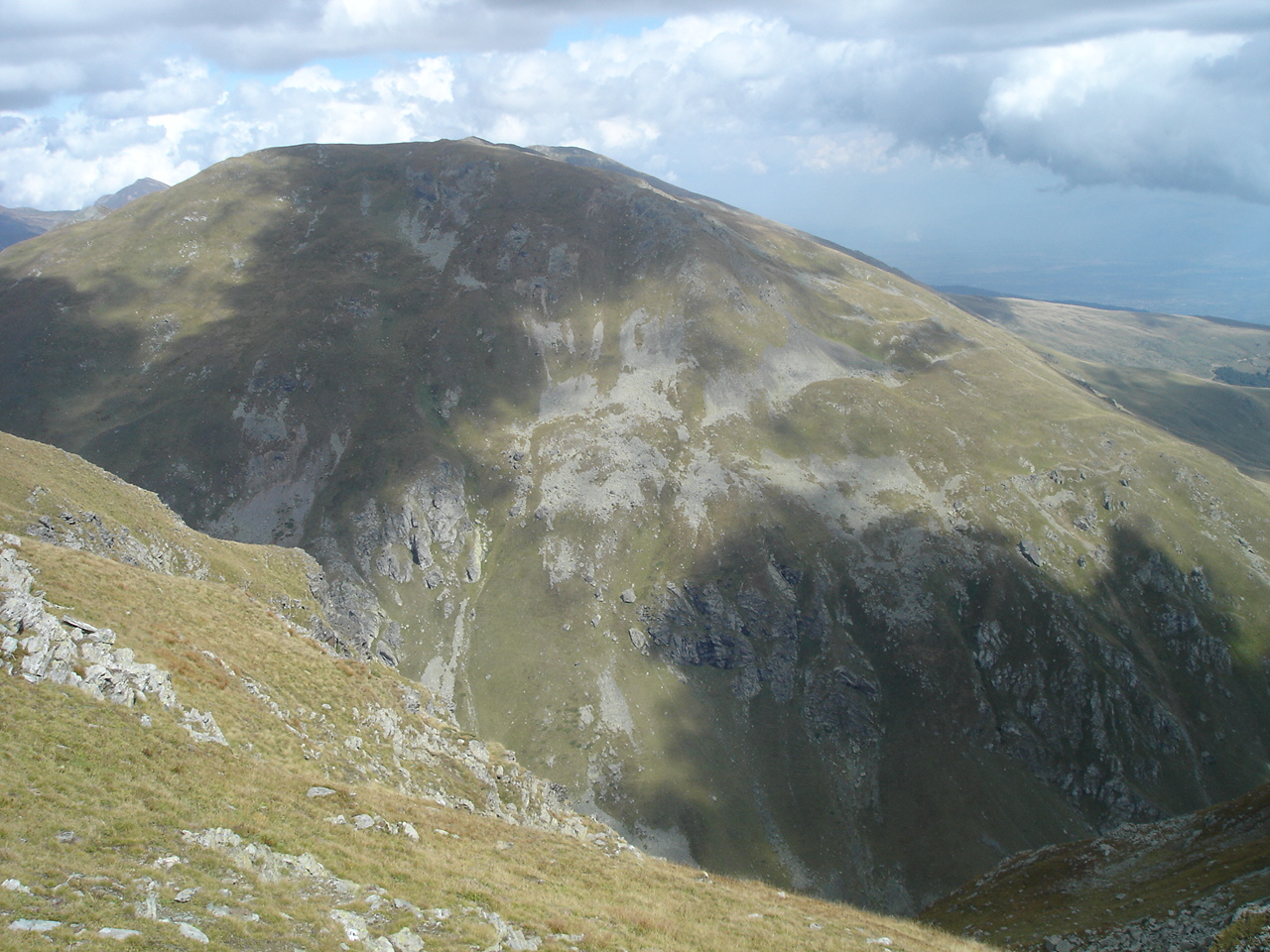

Highest point
- Elevation: 2,660 m (8,727 ft)
- Prominence: 230 m (750 ft)
- Isolation: 7.42 km (4.61 mi) → Titov Vrv
- Listing: Country high point
- Coordinates: 41°55′7″N 20°46′36″E

Geography
- Location within Kosovo Location within North Macedonia Location within Europe
- Countries: Kosovo; North Macedonia
- Parent range: Šar Mountains

Velika Rudoka (Serbian Cyrillic: Велика Рудока; {{ Rudoka e Madhe}}; Macedonian: Рудока, romanized: Rudoka) is the highest peak of the Rudoka Mountain, situated in the Šar Mountains range, exactly on the border between Kosovo and North Macedonia. With the altitude of 2,660 metres (8,727 feet), it is the highest mountain of Kosovo, and also the highest mountain of Serbia according to the view held by the government of Serbia. In some older sources, the altitude was stated to be 2,658 metres, but newer measurements showed that the true altitude is 2 metres higher than this figure.

The Rudoka Mountain is situated between the rest of Šar Planina and Vrace, southwest of Tetovo. The mountain range lies in a southwest to northeasterly direction, neighbouring Borislavec. The eastern slopes are very steep. The western slopes lightly descend into Šar Planina. Few waters are present on the mountain and there are few valleys. Two lakes are on Rudoka: Crno jezero (Black lake) and Belo jezero (White lake). The Mazdrača, a stream which flows into the Vardar, has its source in Crno jezero.

It is a common misconception that the highest mountain in Kosovo is Gjeravica at 2,656 m (8,714 ft). This was stated even in the 2020 Statistical Yearbook of Serbia, and some Serbian schoolbooks. The 2021 edition of the Statistical Yearbook of Serbia corrected the info, naming Velika Rudoka the highest peak, as did the 2021 edition of the Geography schoolbook for Serbian elementary schools. The 2026 edition of the Statistical Yearbook of Kosovo still states that Gjeravica is the highest mountain. It has been known that Velika Rudoka is higher than Gjeravica since at least 1972, when the Topographical Map of Yugoslavia was published. According to Sava Stanković, PhD, the misconception started because of unclear boundaries between the Socialist Republic of Macedonia and the Socialist Republic of Serbia.

The regional Macedonian border was delineated only after the breakup of Yugoslavia by a treaty between the Federal Republic of Yugoslavia and the Republic of Macedonia (contemporary North Macedonia) signed in Skopje on 23 February 2001. However, the 2001 Insurgency in Macedonia led to further territorial disputes, due to militant activities in some border regions. This was finally resolved on 17 October 2009 with a demarcation treaty between Kosovo, and Macedonia, following the Macedonian recognition of Kosovo. Annex 1 of the demarcation treaty adjusted the line at three regions, and Velika Rudoka is not among them.
