= Peskovi =

Mountain between Kosovo and North Macedonia

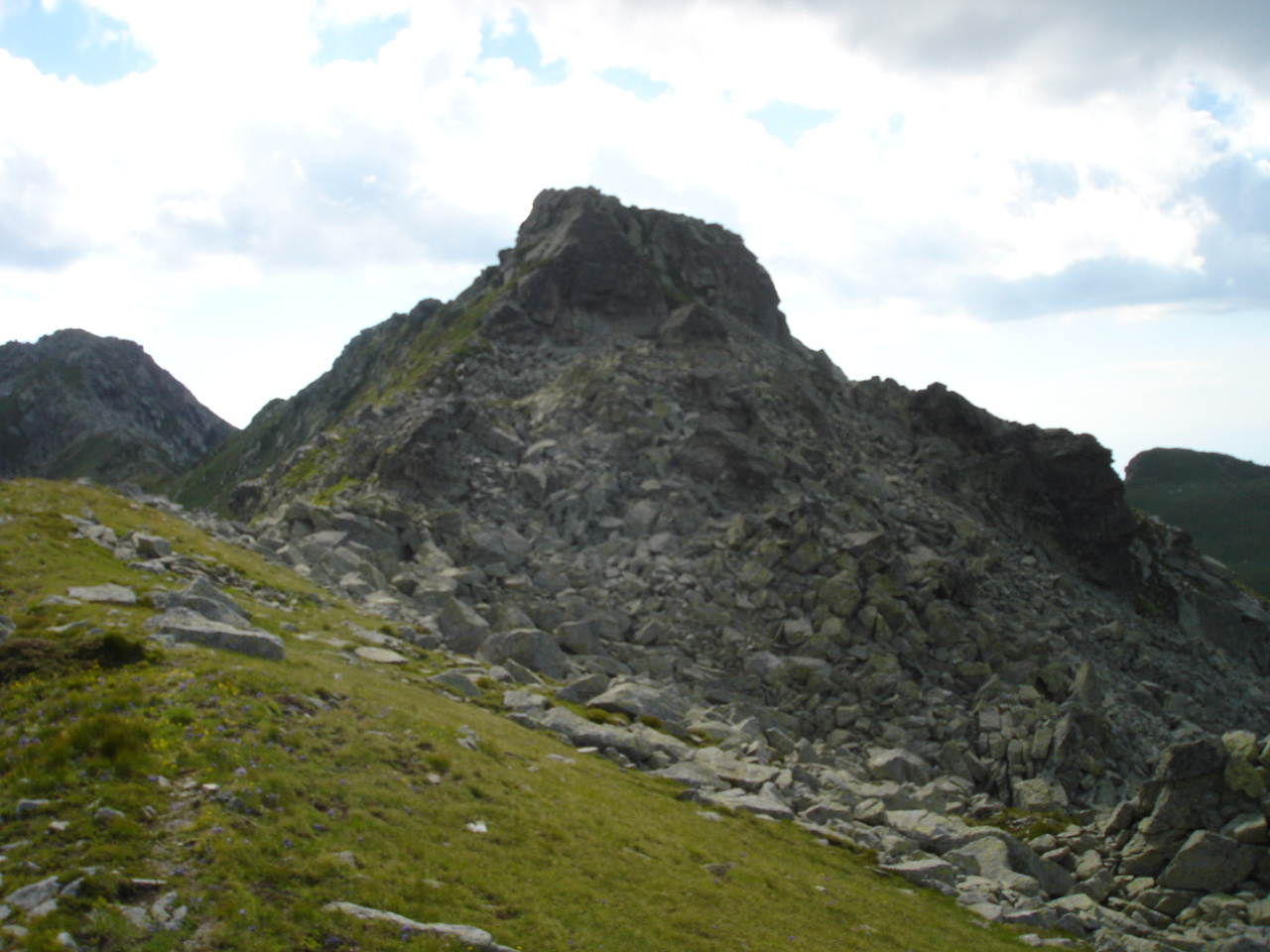
- Peskovi peak on Šar Mountain, Macedonia

Highest point
- Elevation: 2,651 m (8,698 ft)
- Coordinates: 42°08′22″N 20°58′47″E

Geography
- Location within Kosovo
- Location: Kosovo
- Parent range: Šar Mountains

Peskovi (Albanian: Bistër or Bistra; Serbian and Macedonian: Пескови, Peskovi) is a mountain in the Šar Mountains range, located between Kosovo and North Macedonia.

The border line between Kosovo (to the North) and North Macedonia (to the South) goes Northeast along the Šar Mountains, passes over the triangulation point 2,651 m (8,698 ft) in the area s.c. Peskovi, then turns a little Southeast-ward before moving Northeast passing over the elevation 2,597 m (8,520 ft). Peskovi is 2,651 m (8,698 ft) high. It is the third highest mountain in Kosovo after Velika Rudoka and Gjeravica. Several lakes are found on the Kosovan side.
