= Small Jazhincë Lake =

Lake in Kosovo

- Location within Kosovo Location within Europe
- Interactive map of Small Jazhincë Lake
- Location: Sharr Mountains
- Coordinates: 42°09′27″N 21°00′17″E
- Basin countries: Kosovo
- Max. length: 50 m (160 ft)
- Max. width: 30 m (98 ft)
- Surface elevation: 2,200 m (7,200 ft)

The Small Jazhincë Lake (Albanian: Liqeni i vogël i Jazhincës, Serbian: Мало јажиначко језеро / Malo jažinačko jezero) is a small lake on the Sharr Mountains in Kosovo. The Small Jazhincë Lake is 2,200 m (7,218 ft) above sea level and has a maximum length of 50 m (164 ft) and a maximum width of 30 m (98 ft). The lake is surrounded by large rocks.

== See also ==
- List of lakes of Kosovo
- Jazhincë Lake
- Donji Vir Lake
