= Livadh Lake =

Lake in Kosovo

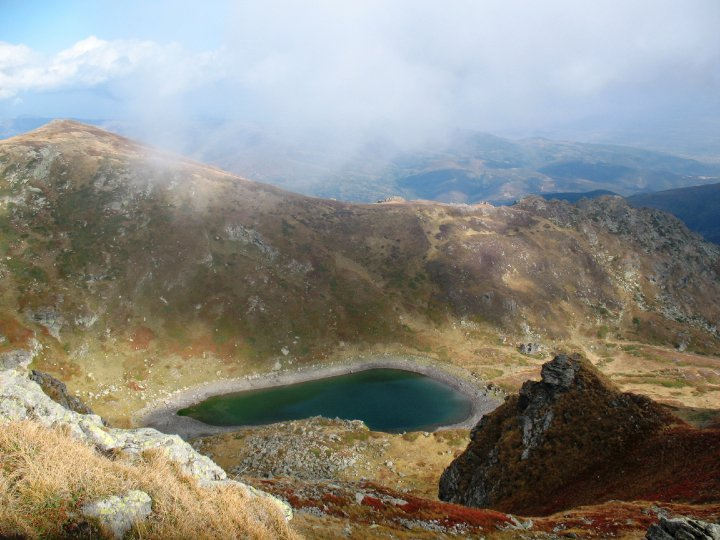
- In summer with Ljuboten peak in the distance

- Location within Kosovo Location within Europe
- Interactive map of Livadh Lake
- Location: Šar Mountains
- Coordinates: 42°09′06″N 20°59′40″E
- Basin countries: Kosovo; North Macedonia
- Max. length: 228 m (748 ft)
- Max. width: 120 m (390 ft)
- Surface area: 0.017 km^{2} (0.0066 sq mi)
- Max. depth: 7.3 m (24 ft)
- Surface elevation: 2,173 m (7,129 ft)

Livadh Lake (Albanian: Liqeni i Livadhit or Shterbaqko; Serbian: Штрбачко језеро, Štrbačko jezero or Ливадичко језеро, Livadičko jezero, Macedonian: Ливадичко езеро) is a mountain lake in the Shar Mountains in Kosovo. It lies at an elevation of 2,173 m (7,129 ft) above sea level and has a maximum length of 228 m (748 ft) and a maximum width of 120 m (394 ft).

It is next to the Tumba Peak (Šar) and Maja Livadh peaks.

== See also ==
- List of lakes of Kosovo
