= Donji Vir Lake =

Lake in Kosovo

- Location within Kosovo Location within Europe
- Interactive map of Donji Vir Lake
- Location: Sharr Mountains
- Coordinates: 42°09′26.6″N 21°00′16″E
- Basin countries: Kosovo
- Max. length: 30 m (98 ft)
- Max. width: 30 m (98 ft)
- Surface elevation: 2,200 m (7,200 ft)

The Donji Vir (Albanian: Liqeni i Donji i Virit; Serbian: Доњи Вир / Donji Vir) is one of the smallest mountain lakes in the Šar Mountains of Kosovo. It is shaped like a circle and has a rough diameter of 30 m (98 ft). It is situated just a few meters west of the larger Small Jazhincë Lake.

== See also ==
- List of lakes of Kosovo
- Small Jazhincë Lake
