= Tumba Peak (Šar) =

Mountain in Kosovo

Coordinates: 42.146°N 21.02°E

Tumba (Albanian: Tumba) is a mountain peak found in south-east Kosovo. It is 2,346 m (7,697 ft) high. Tumba is part of the long ridge of the Šar Mountains. It is in the northern part of the range and its peak is just above the Livadh Lake. It is next to the Maja Livadh.

== See also ==
- Geography of Kosovo
- List of mountains in Kosovo
