= Isa Aga =

Mountain peak in Kosovo and Macedonia

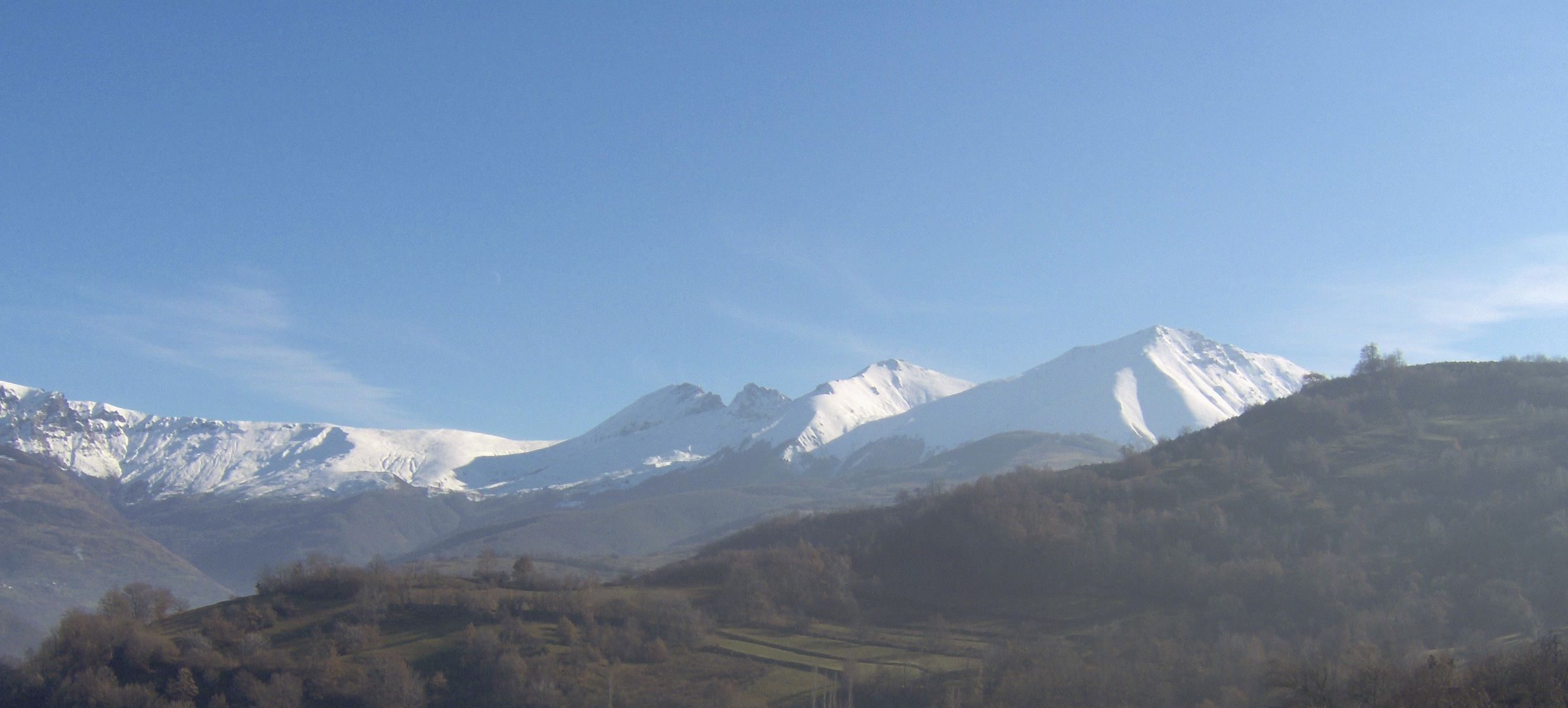
- Vrtop to the right. Kobilica in the center.

Highest point
- Elevation: 2,555 m (8,383 ft)
- Coordinates: 42°05′55″N 20°50′36″E

Geography
- Location within Kosovo
- Location: Kosovo^{[a]}
- Parent range: Šar Mountains

Isa Aga (also called Vrtop or Van Korff) is a mountain peak in Kosovo and North Macedonia. It is part of the Šar Mountains and is found in the middle of the ridge. It is 2,555 m (8,383 ft) high.
