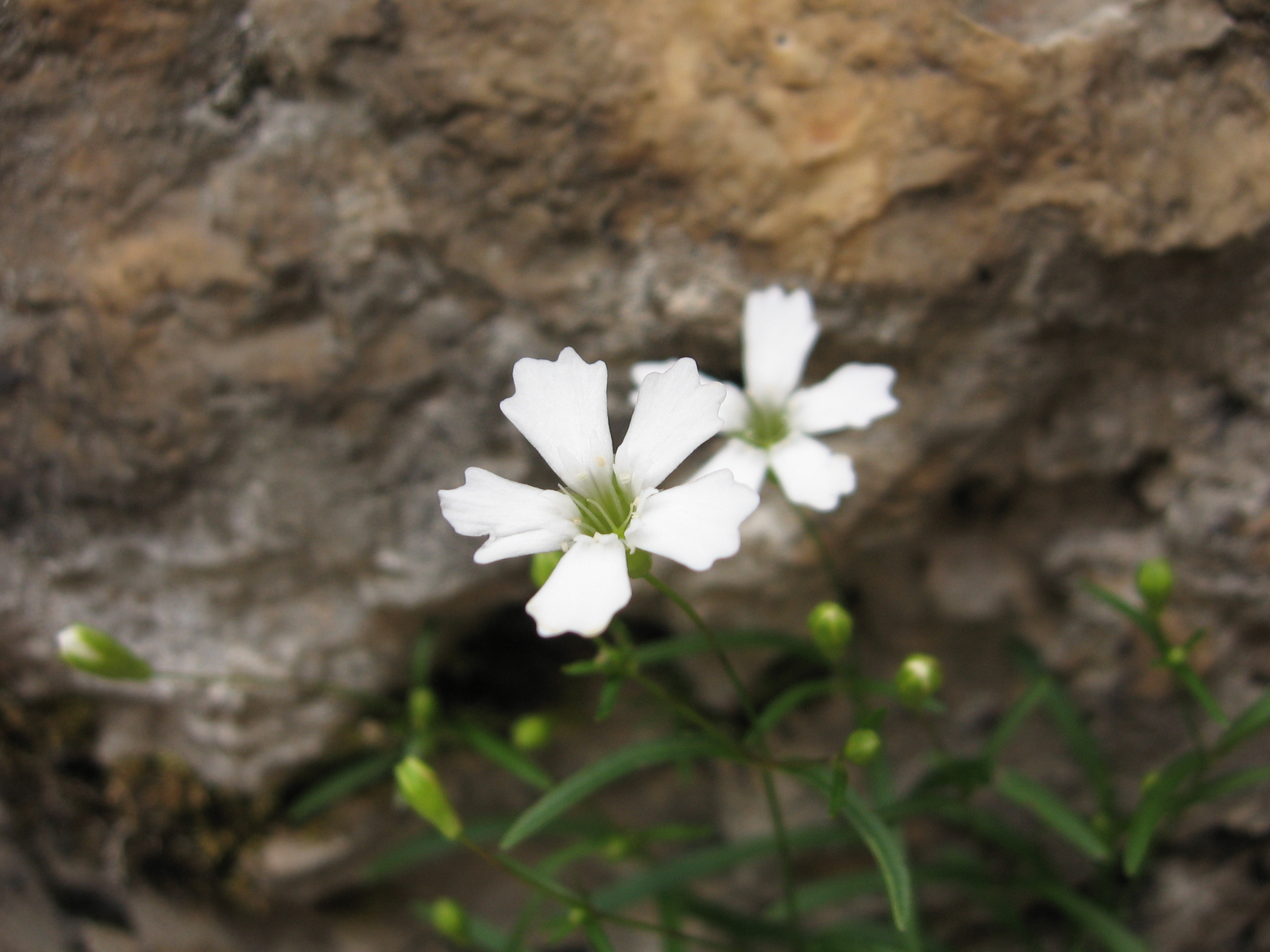
- Heliosperma pusillum

Scientific classification
- Kingdom: Plantae
- Clade: Tracheophytes
- Clade: Angiosperms
- Clade: Eudicots
- Order: Caryophyllales
- Family: Caryophyllaceae
- Genus: Heliosperma (Rchb.) Rchb.

Synonyms
- Ixoca Raf.; Silene sect. Heliosperma Rchb.

= Heliosperma =

Genus of flowering plants

Heliosperma is a genus of flowering plants in the family Caryophyllaceae. As such, it is closely related to the large genus Silene, but its members can be told apart from Silene by the crest of long papillae on the seeds. The majority of the species are narrow endemics from the Balkan Peninsula, but H. alpestre is endemic to the Eastern Alps, and H. pusillum is found from the Cordillera Cantábrica in northern Spain to the Carpathians. Like members of the genus Silene and other related genera, Heliosperma is attacked by species of the anther smut fungus Microbotryum. Cases of parallel divergence events between alpine and mountain populations have been reported in this genus.

== Species ==
Around 15 species are currently recognised in the genus:

- Heliosperma albanicum K.Malý
- Heliosperma alpestre Rchb. – Eastern Alps
- Heliosperma chromodontum Rohrb. – Greece
- Heliosperma insulare Trinajstić – Croatia
- Heliosperma intonsum (Greuter & Melzh.) Niketić & Stevan. – Greece
- Heliosperma macranthum Pančić
- Heliosperma monachorum Vis. & Pančić
- Heliosperma nikolicii (A.Seliger & Wraber) Niketić & Stevan. – Kosovo
- Heliosperma oliverae Niketić & Stevan. – Montenegro
- Heliosperma pudibundum Griseb.
- Heliosperma pusillum Vis. – NW Spain, Pyrenees, Alps, Carpathians
- Heliosperma retzdorffianum Maly – Bosnia and Herzegovina
- Heliosperma tommasinii Vis. – Montenegro, Albania
- Heliosperma vandasii Neumayer – Macedonia
- Heliosperma veselskyi Janka – Slovenia
