= Titov Vrv =

Peak in North Macedonia

- Turk i Madh; Golem Turčin (former name)
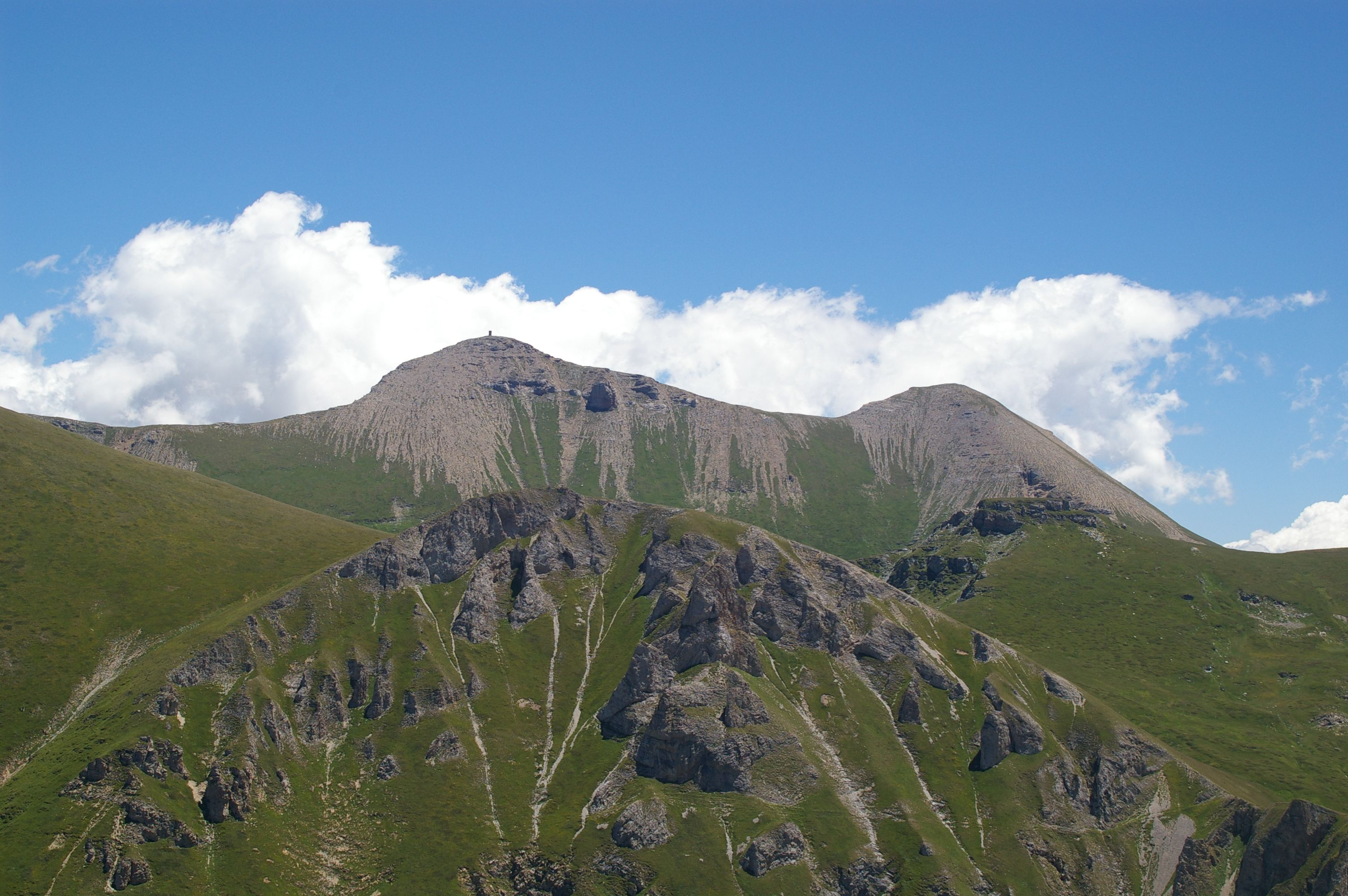
- View of Titov Vrv (left) and Mal Turčin (right)

Highest point
- Elevation: 2,748 m (9,016 ft)
- Coordinates: 41°59′31″N 20°47′53″E

Geography
- Location within North Macedonia
- Location: North Macedonia
- Parent range: Šar Mountain

Titov Vrv (Macedonian: Титов Врв, lit. 'Tito's Peak'; Albanian: Turku i Madh, lit. 'Big Turk') is the highest peak of the Šar Mountains at 2,748 m (9,016 ft). It is located about 13 mi (21 km) northwest of the city of Tetovo in North Macedonia, near the border with Kosovo.

== Name ==
The summit's original name is "Big Turk" (Macedonian: Голем Турчин, Albanian: Turku i Madh). In 1934, the peak was renamed to Mount Aleksandar, in honor of Aleksandar I of Yugoslavia, after his assassination. During World War II, the Bulgarian authorities restored its original name (Bulgarian: Голем Турчин). The peak was renamed in 1953 in honor of Josip Broz Tito. The name has remained unchanged since Macedonian independence in 1991, however in other neighboring languages such as Turkish, Albanian, and Bulgarian it is still known as the "Big Turk" . In varieties of Serbo-Croatian it is known as Titov vrh. Тhe smaller neighboring peak is known as "Small Turk" (Macedonian: Мал Турчин, Albanian: Turku i Vogël).

== Activity ==
Every year, on the last weekend of May, the Ljuboten mountain club holds a climb to this peak.

In December 2022, the inside of the tower at the top of the peak was vandalized.

== Gallery ==
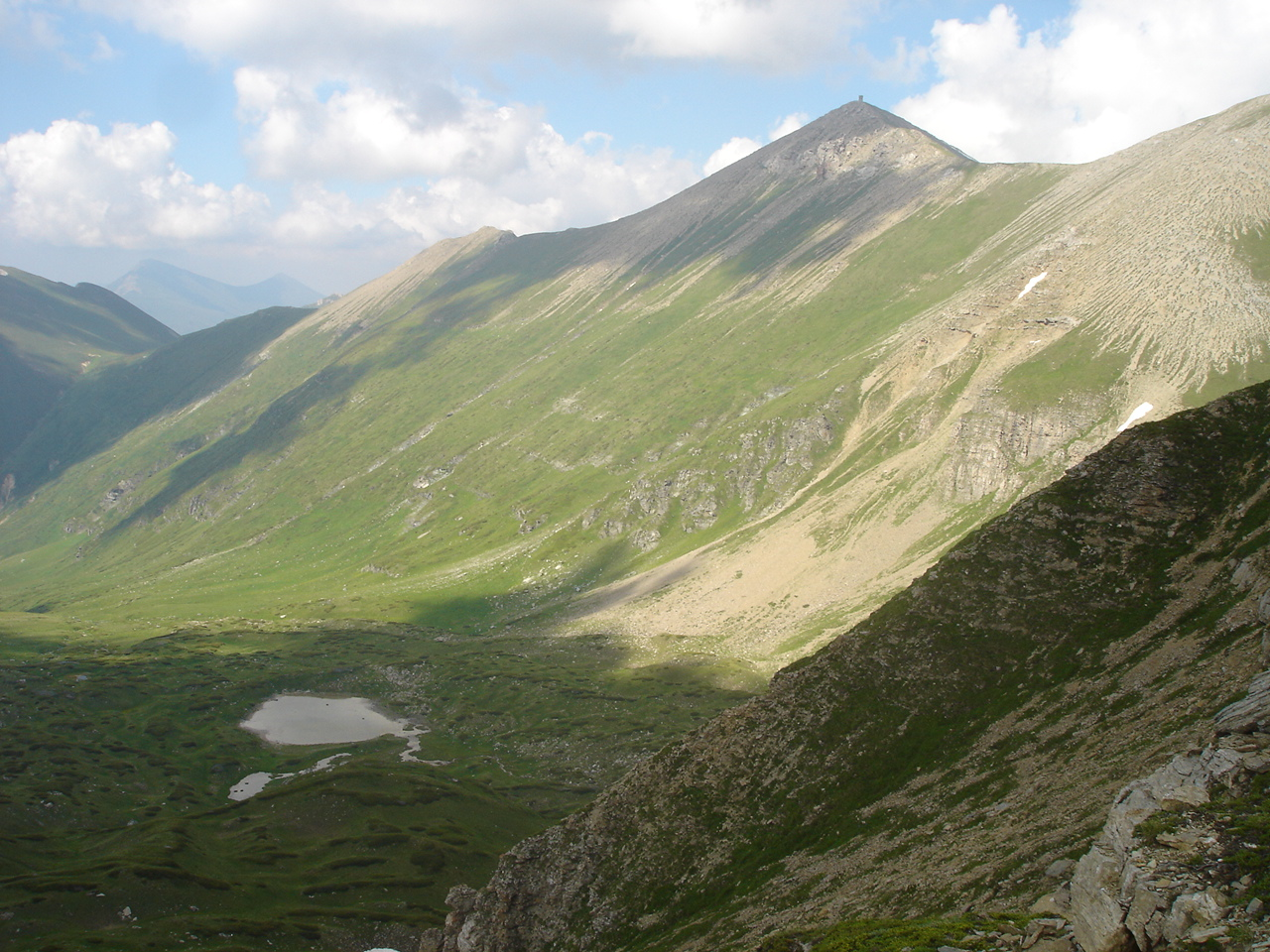
View of Titov Vrv, with Lake Krivošijsko in the foothills

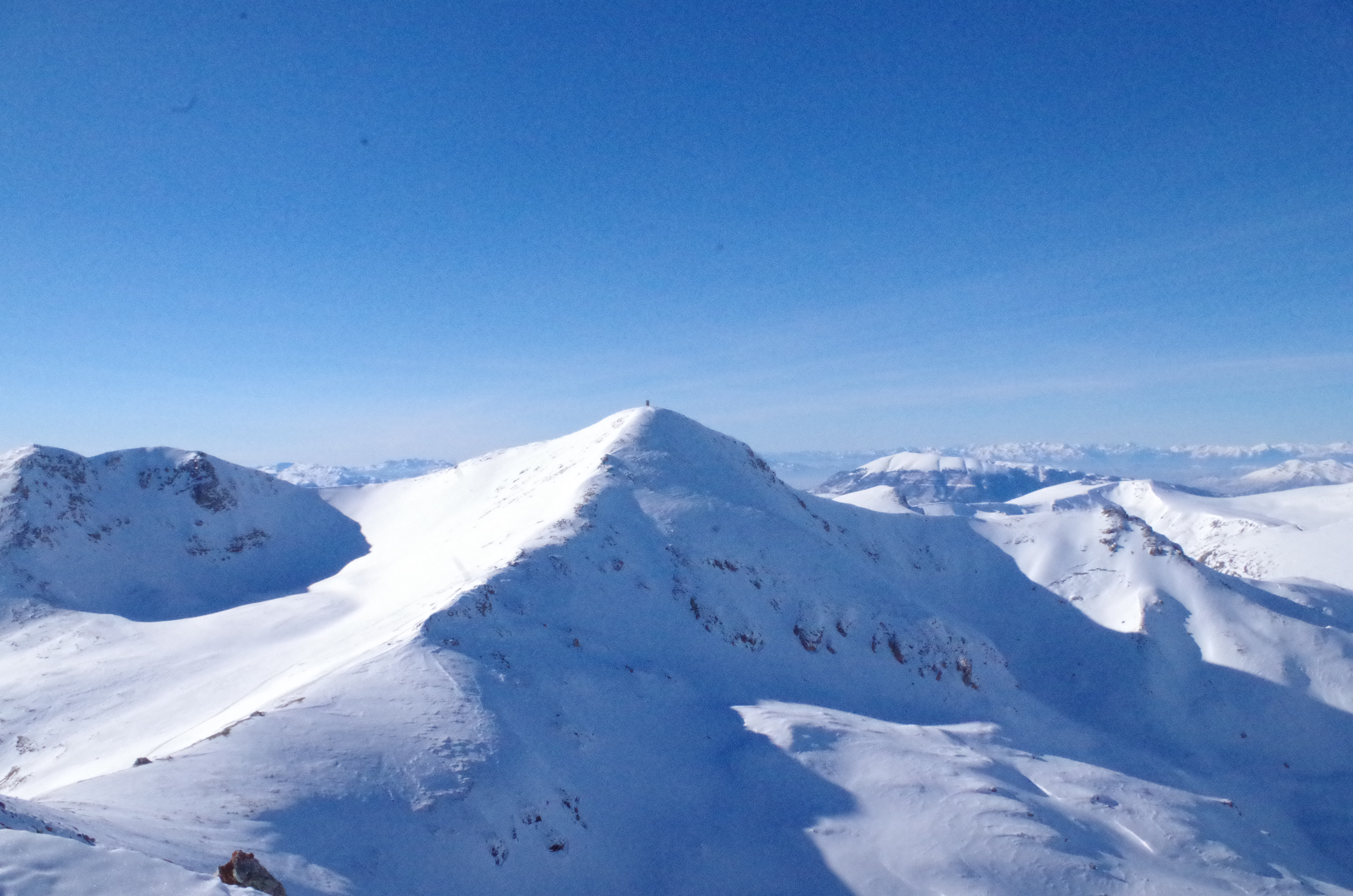
View of Titov Vrv from Bakardan

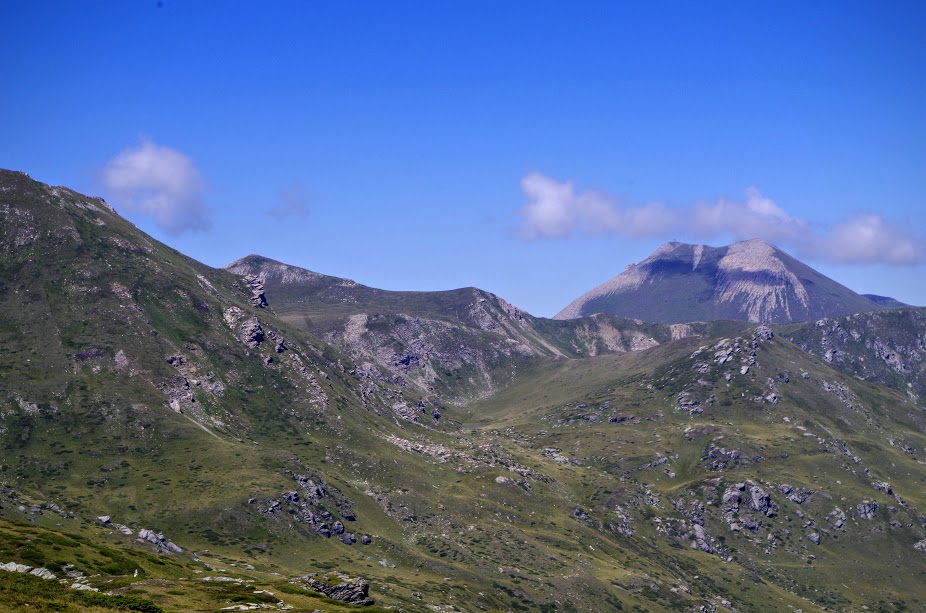
View of Titov Vrv from Mal Turčin

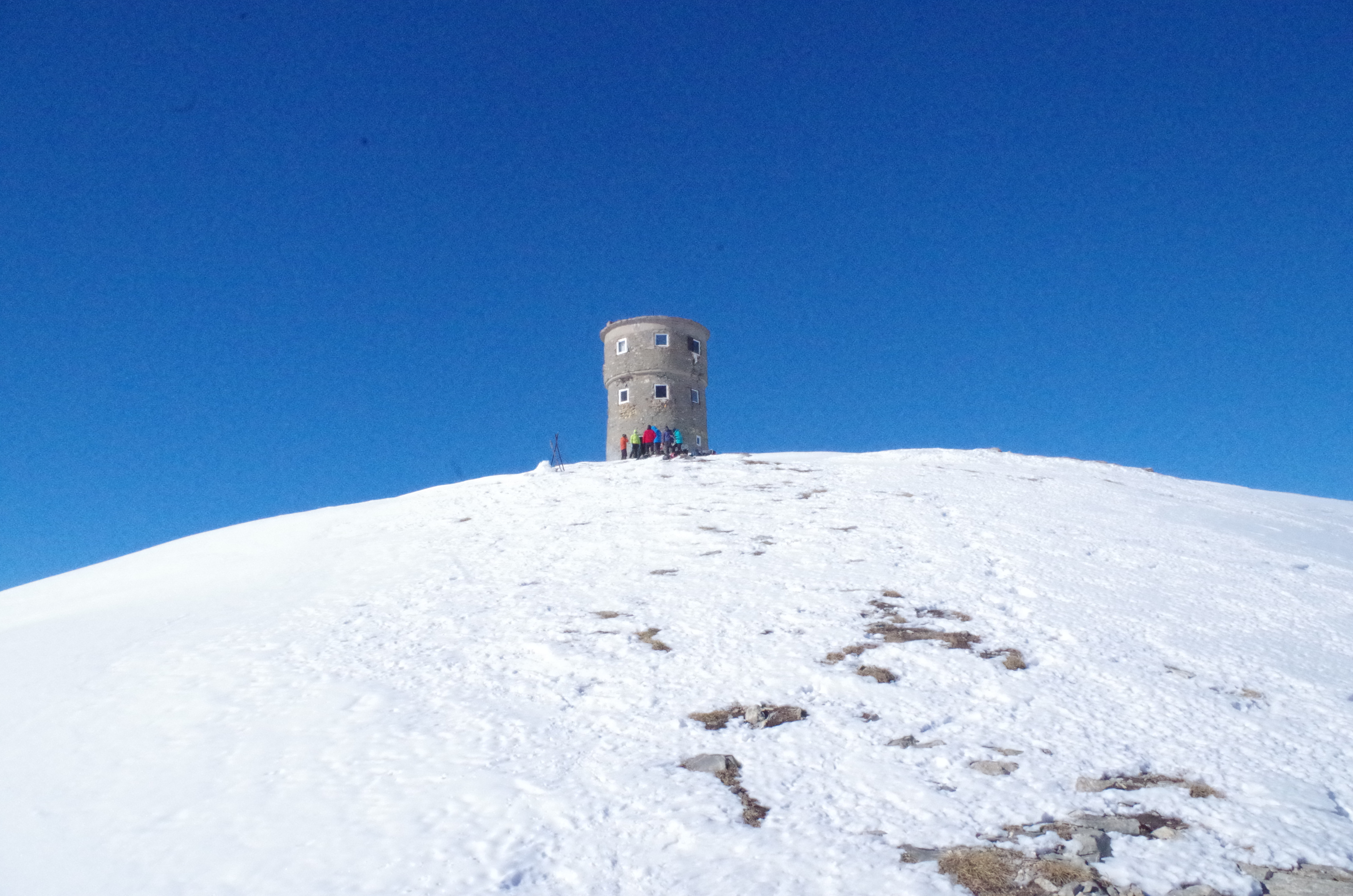
Tower at the top of the peak

== See also ==
- List of places named after Josip Broz Tito
- Šar Mountains
- Korab (mountain)
