= Black Peak, Šar Mountains =

Peak in Kosovo and North Macedonia

Coordinates: 42.1532°N 21.0273°E

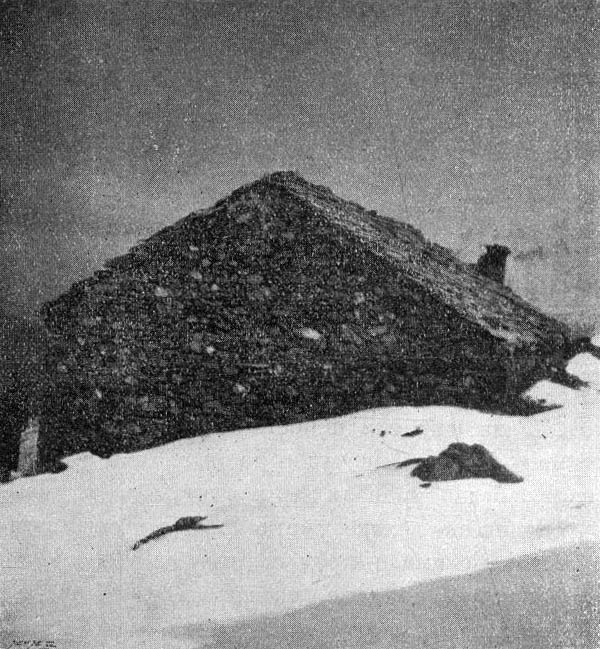
Black Peak guardpost (1899).

Black Peak (Albanian: Guri i Zi; Serbian: Црни Камен / Crni.Kamen; Macedonian: Црн Камен, romanized: Crn Kamen) is a peak of the Šar Mountains located in Kosovo and North Macedonia. Black Peak stands at 2,536 m (8,320 ft) above sea level. The famous Brezovica ski resort is situated close to the peak.
