= Maja Livadh =

Mountain peak in Kosovo and North Macedonia

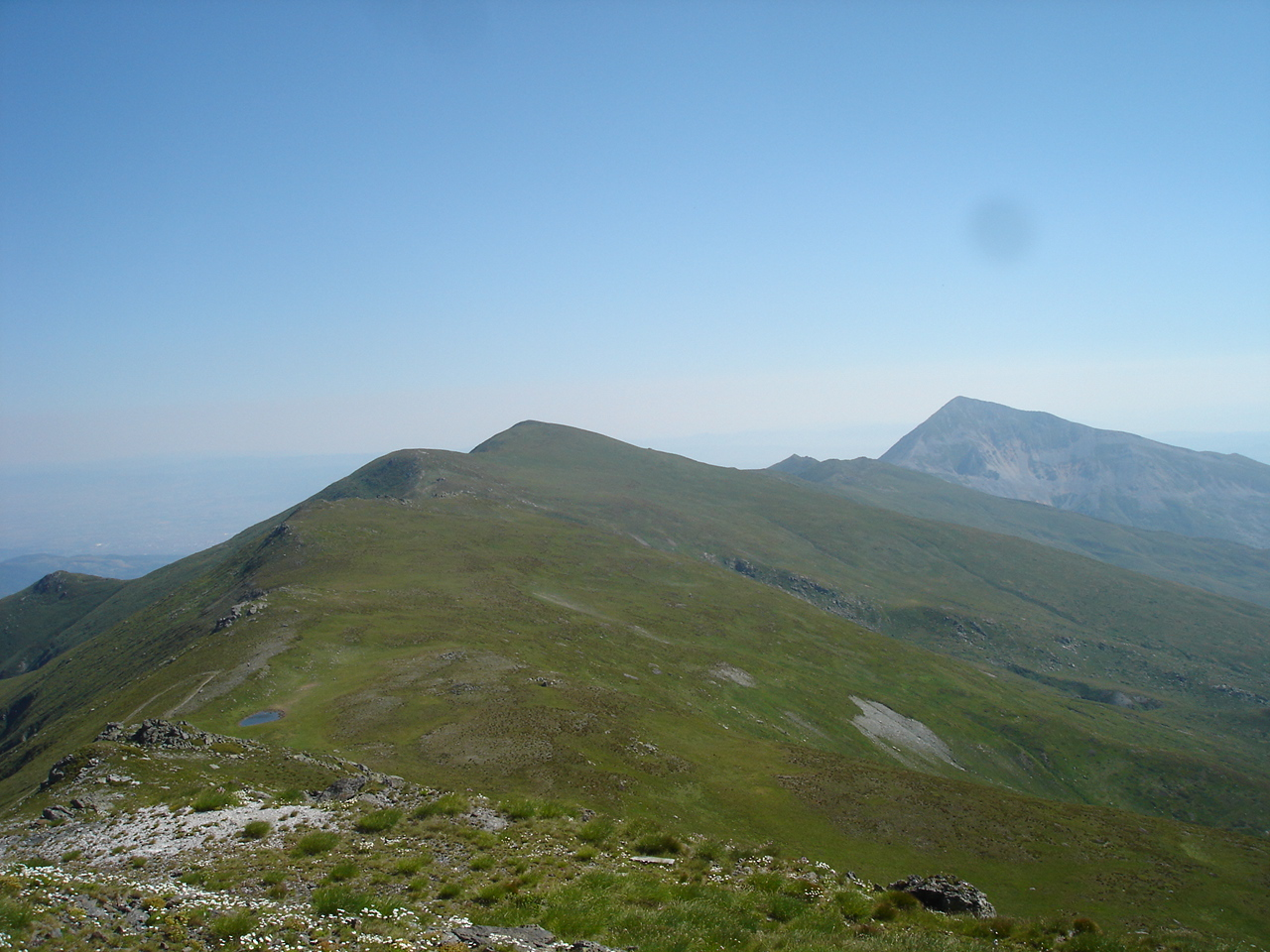

Highest point
- Elevation: 2,497 m (8,192 ft)
- Parent peak: Sharr Mountains
- Coordinates: 42.1487°N 20.9956°E

Geography
- Location within Kosovo
- Countries: Kosovo; North Macedonia

Maja Livadh (Macedonian: Ливадички Брег, Livadički Breg) is a mountain peak of the Šar Mountains. Maja Livadh forms the boundary between Kosovo and North Macedonia. It has a height of 2,497 m (8,192 ft) and right under its summit is Livadh Lake, the Šar Mountains most northern mountains lake.

== See also ==
- List of mountains in Kosovo
- National parks of Kosovo
