= Kobilica =

Mountain peak in the Šar Mountains

- Maja e Berit
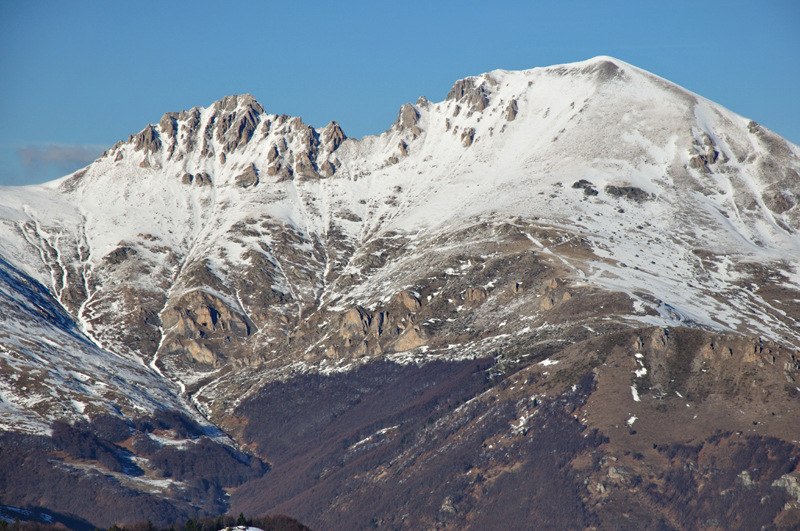
- Kobilica seen from the south side

Highest point
- Elevation: 2,528 m (8,294 ft)
- Coordinates: 42°05′46″N 20°53′01″E

Geography
- Location within Kosovo
- Location: Kosovo
- Parent range: Šar Mountains

Kobilica (Macedonian and Serbian Cyrillic: Кобилица; Albanian: Kobilicë, Maja e Berit) is a mountain peak in the Šar Mountains. It is 2,528 m high and is located on central part of the main Shara ridge that forms the border between North Macedonia and Kosovo. It can be seen from the Kosovo city of Prizren as well as from Tetovo in North Macedonia.

The peak is known for its sharp pyramidal shape and the rocky ridge Treskavec on it western side. It inspires with its proper shape and awes with its sharp edges. It is sometimes dubbed as Tetovo Materhorn.

== Gallery ==
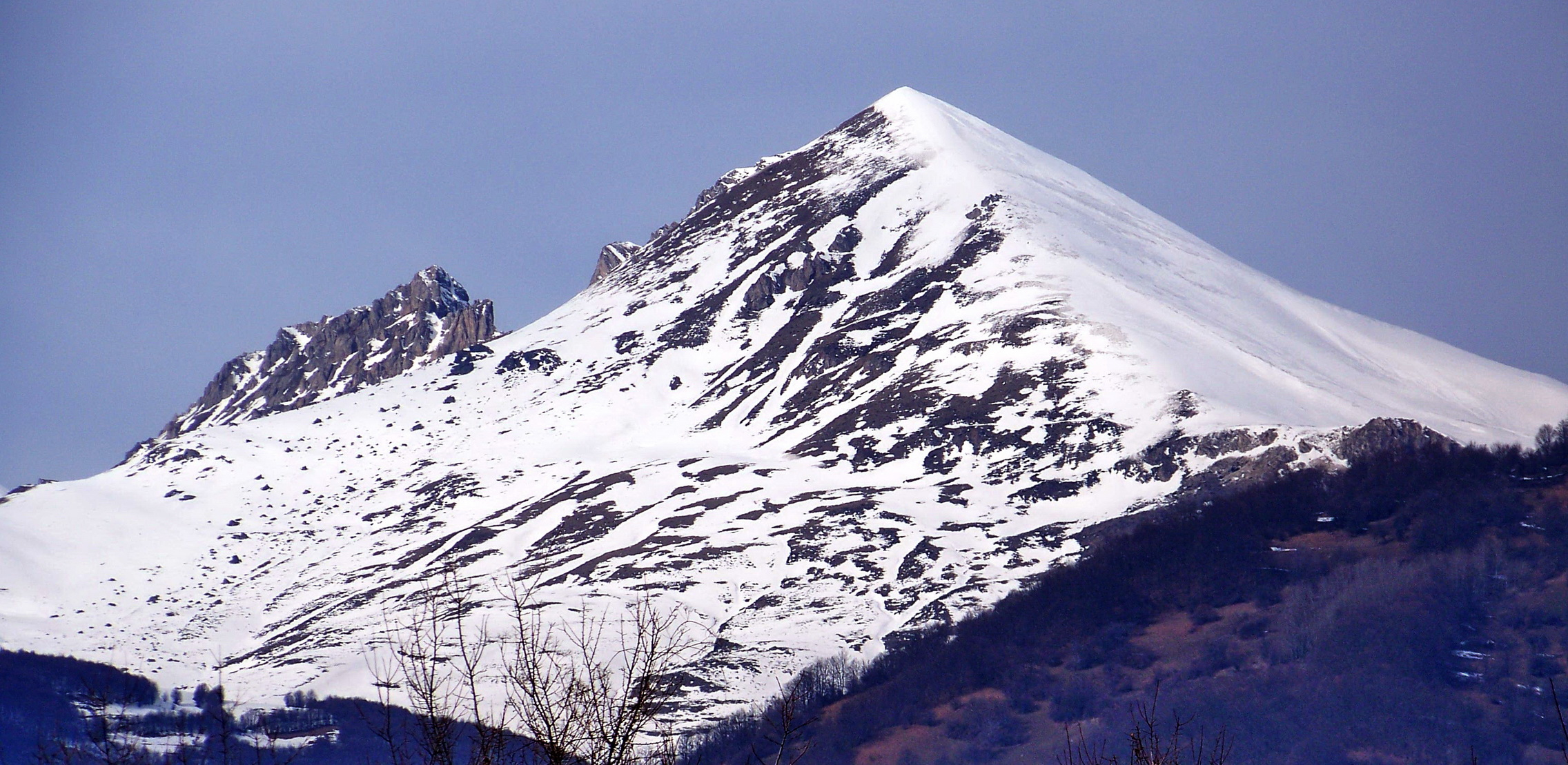
Kobilica seen from Tetovo

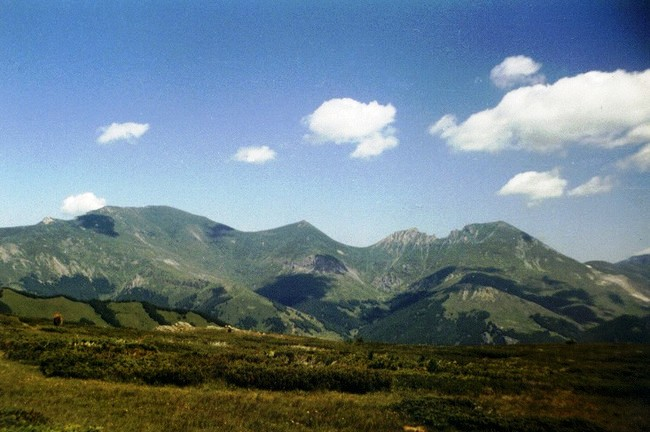
Kobilica, Treskavec and Vrtop (right to left)
