= List of mountains in Kosovo =

The mountains of Kosovo mainly consist of the Accursed Mountains in the west, the Šar Mountains in the south and the Kopaonik Mountains in the northeast. The Accursed Mountains and the Šar Mountains both are home to the highest peaks in Kosovo rising well over 2,500 m (8,202 ft), while Kopaonik mountains raise to a maximum of 2,017 m (6,617 ft).

The mountains have some special landscapes like the Rugova Canyon and the Kaçanik Gorge. There are alpine and glacial lakes located in most of the mountains.

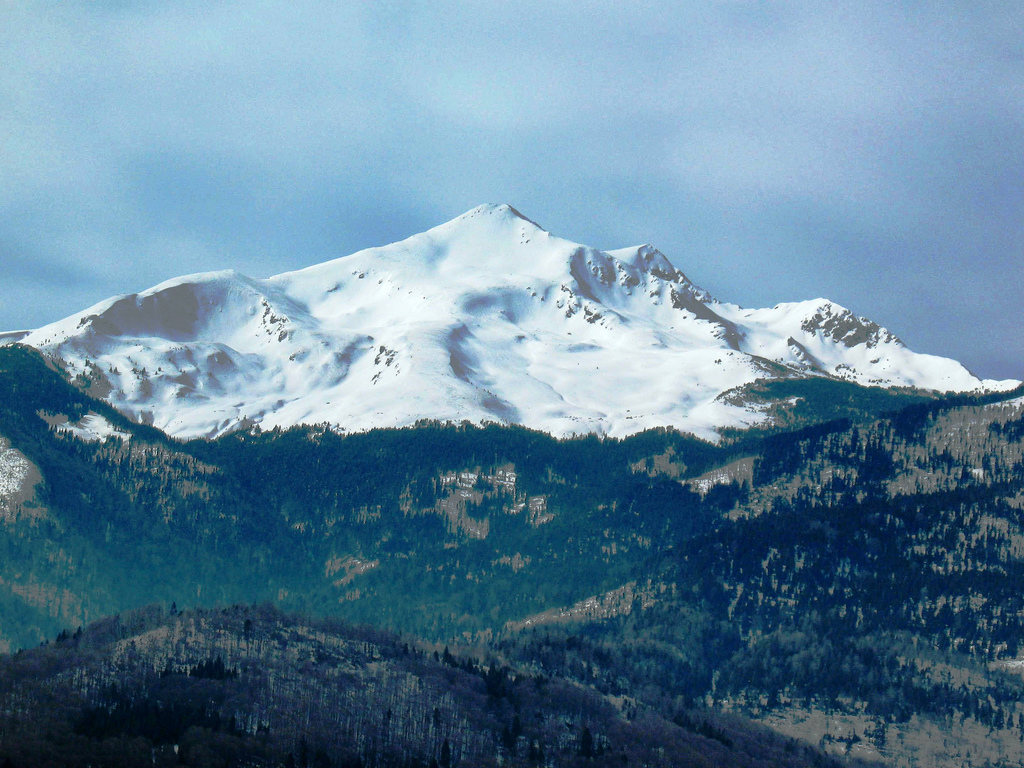
Gjeravica 2,656m - eastern face

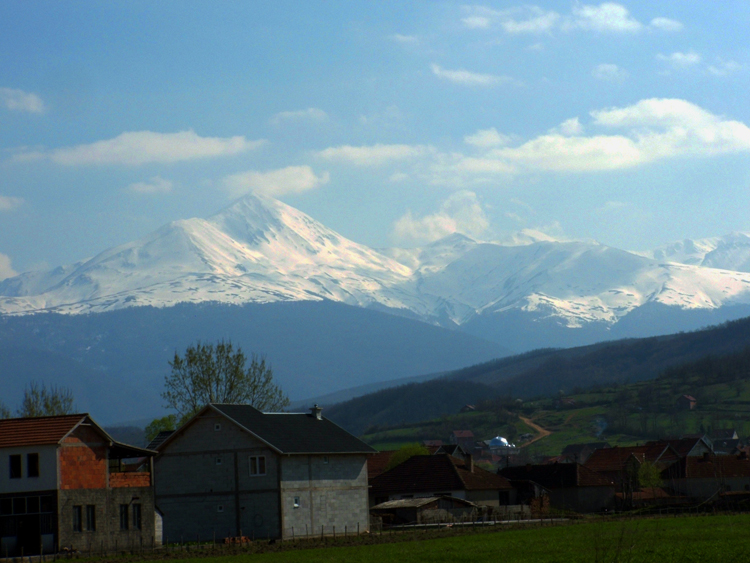
Mount Luboten as seen from Ferizaj.

== List of highest peaks in Kosovo ==
Rank	Peak	Image	Mountain	Height
1	Rudoka - 'Rudoka e Madhe' - south peak of double-summit		Šar Mountains	2,660 m (8,727 ft)
2	Rudoka - north peak of double summit		Šar Mountains	2,658 m (8,720 ft)
3	Gjeravica		Accursed Mountains	2,656 m (8,714 ft)
4	Bistra – east summit		Šar Mountains	2,651 m (8,698 ft)
5	Bistra – west summit		Šar Mountains	2,644 m (8,675 ft)
6	Rudoka - 'Rudoka e Vogël' - unnamed summit on ridge		Šar Mountains	2,629 m (8,625 ft)
7	Rudoka - unnamed summit on ridge		Hurricane XLT3 Mountains	2,629 m (8,625 ft)
8	Rudoka - unnamed summit on ridge		Šar Mountains	2,618 m (8,589 ft)
9	Gjini Beg		Šar Mountains	2,610 m (8,563 ft)
10	Lake Peak / Jezerski / Maja e Liqenit		Šar Mountains	2,604 m (8,543 ft)
11	Trpeznica / Trpeznica / Tërepeznicë		Šar Mountains	2,590 m (8,497 ft)
12	Maja e Zezë		Šar Mountains	2,585 m (8,481 ft)
13	Big Vraca / Vracë e Madhe		Šar Mountains	2,583 m (8,474 ft)
14	Konjushka		Šar Mountains	2,571 m (8,435 ft)
15	Unnamed peak north-west of Gjeravica		Accursed Mountains	2,570 m (8,432 ft)
16	Isa Aga / Vrtop		Šar Mountains	2,555 m (8,383 ft)
17	Gusani		Accursed Mountains	2,539 m (8,330 ft)
18	Black Peak / Crni Kamen / Maja e Gurit		Šar Mountains	2,536 m (8,320 ft)
19	Marijash		Accursed Mountains	2,533 m (8,310 ft)
20	Kobilica / Kobilicë		Šar Mountains	2,528 m (8,294 ft)
21	Piribeg		Šar Mountains	2,524 m (8,281 ft)
22	Guri i Kuq		Accursed Mountains	2,522 m (8,274 ft)
23	Maja e Ropës		Accursed Mountains	2,501 m (8,205 ft)
24	Luboten		Šar Mountains	2,498 m (8,196 ft)
25	Maja Livadh		Šar Mountains	2,497 m (8,192 ft)
26	Maja e Begut		Šar Mountains	2,493 m (8,179 ft)
27	Zallina		Šar Mountains	2,493 m (8,179 ft)
28	Small Vraca		Šar Mountains	2,483 m (8,146 ft)
29	Guri i Çarë		Šar Mountains	2,466 m (8,091 ft)
30	Kopranik		Accursed Mountains	2,460 m (8,071 ft)
31	Maja e Bardhë		Accursed Mountains	2,426 m (7,959 ft)
32	Kleç		Šar Mountains	2,414 m (7,920 ft)
33	Veternik Mountain		Accursed Mountains	2,410 m (7,907 ft)
34	Kara Nikolla		Šar Mountains	2,409 m (7,904 ft)
35	Hajla / Hajlë		Accursed Mountains	2,403 m (7,884 ft)
36	Maja e Pikëllimës		Koritnik	2,393 m (7,851 ft)
37	Rusolia		Accursed Mountains	2,382 m (7,815 ft)
38	Mali i Zhlebit		Accursed Mountains	2,381 m (7,812 ft)
39	Strellc		Accursed Mountains	2,377 m (7,799 ft)
40	Trekufiri		Accursed Mountains	2,366 m (7,762 ft)
41	Mali i Zhlebit / Žljeb		Accursed Mountains	2,365 m (7,759 ft)
42	Tumba		Šar Mountains	2,346 m (7,697 ft)
43	Leqinat / Lićenat		Accursed Mountains	2,341 m (7,680 ft)
44	Bardhalevë		Šar Mountains	2,334 m (7,657 ft)
45	Rrasa e Zogut		Junik Mountains	2,305 m (7,562 ft)
46	Mramor		Šar Mountains	2,298 m (7,539 ft)
47	Hajla e Vëranocit		Accursed Mountains	2,281 m (7,484 ft)
48	Qula		Šar Mountains	2,220 m (7,283 ft)
49	Oshlak		Šar Mountains	2,212 m (7,257 ft)
50	Kačina glava / Kaçina Glava		Šar Mountains	2,207 m (7,241 ft)
51	Deçan Mountain / Mali i Deçanit		Accursed Mountains	2,200 m (7,218 ft)
52	Gemitash / Gemitaš		Šar Mountains	2,183 m (7,162 ft)
53	Ovčinec / Ovshinec		Šar Mountains	2,177 m (7,142 ft)
54	Kallabak		Šar Mountains	2,174 m (7,133 ft)
55	Pogled**		Accursed Mountains	2,156 m (7,073 ft)
56	Beleg		Accursed Mountains	2,142 m (7,028 ft)
57	Dramadol		Accursed Mountains	2,120 m (6,955 ft)
58	Crnkamenska Kula / Kulla e Gurit të Zi		Šar Mountains	2,117 m (6,946 ft)
59	Pashallore / Pašalor		Šar Mountains	2,092 m (6,864 ft)
60	Ksulja e Priftit / Šerupa		Šar Mountains	2,092 m (6,864 ft)
61	Crn Kamen / Guri i Zi		Šar Mountains	2,051 m (6,729 ft)
62	Kruševačka Planina / Mali Krushvaçës		Šar Mountains	2,048 m (6,719 ft)
63	Murgë / Murga		Šar Mountains	2,025 m (6,644 ft)
64	Pančić's Peak		Kopaonik	2,017 m (6,617 ft)
65	Maja e Vjelakut / Volujak		Accursed Mountains	2,014 m (6,608 ft)
66	Hajla e Shkrelit		Accursed Mountains	2,011 m (6,598 ft)
67	Lisičji Kamen / Guri i Lisiçjit		Šar Mountains	2,010 m (6,594 ft)

List of other mountain peaks in Kosovo that have a significant altitude

Mountain	Highest peak(s)	Elevation (m)	Coordinates	Nearest town
Carraleva	Garamele	1160	42°24′43″N 20°58′02″E	Shtime
Carraleva	Gradina (peak)	1055	42°28′48″N 20°51′01″E	Malisheva
Gollak	Gollak-Lisica	1186	42°41′30″N 21°41′21″E	Pristina
Golesh	Golesh	1,019 m (3,343 ft)		
Karadak Mountains	Kopilaqa	1492	42°14′4.2″N 21°26′27.3″E	Vitia
Maja e Liqenit	Ostrvica	2092	42°14′29″N 20°54′51″E	Prizren
Maja e Liqenit	Karadino	1656	42°18′01″N 21°02′3″E	Štrpce
Maja e Liqenit	Bukova Glava (peak)	1677	42°19′35″N 20°58′4″E	Suva Reka
Maja e Liqenit	Studenica, Kosovo (peak)	1723	42°18′36″N 20°59′04″E	Suva Reka
Kopaonik	Bajraku/Maja e Mprehtë	1789	43°01′11″N 21°01′10″E	Mitrovica
Kopaonik	Šatorica	1750	43°06′41″N 20°58′49″E	Leposavić
Koritnik	Koritnik	2393	42°04′54″N 20°33′45″E	Prizren
Koznica	Gerbesh	1230	42°39′35″N 21°22′4″E	Pristina
Mokra gora	Novi Vrh (peak)	1806	42°50′00″N 20°26′50″E	Peja
Mokra gora	Ruica	1814	42°51′58″N 20°33′09″E	Peja
Nerodimka Mountain	Kurkulica	1549	42°18′37″N 21°03′5″E	Ferizaj
Pashtrik		1986	42°12′45″N 20°31′48″E	Prizren
Accursed Mountains	Gjeravica	2656	42°32′01″N 20°08′40″E	Peja
Accursed Mountains	Guri i Kuq	2522	42°39′40″N 20°08′20″E	Peja
Šar Mountains	Isa Aga	2555	42°05′55″N 20°50′05″E	Prizren
Šar Mountains	Peskovi	2651	42°08′29″N 20°59′00″E	Prizren
Šar Mountains	Crni Vrh	2585	42°07′42″N 20°55′28″E	Prizren
Šar Mountains	Luboten	2498	42°12′28″N 21°07′29″E	Ferizaj
Strellc		2377	42°35′55″N 20°14′07″E	Peja
Strellc	Koprivnik	2461	42°37′12″N 20°12′42″E	Peja
Žar Mountain	Pljoš	1694	42°16′17″N 20°57′01″E	Suva Reka

== Border peaks ==
Here are some of the less significant peaks, but that define the border of Kosovo and are thus interesting.

North East on the border to Serbia :

- Babina Stena 43.210278°N 20.601111°E
- Lipovicë 43.203889°N 20.620278°E
- Grab (peak) 43.174444°N 20.611389°E
- Veliki Bukovik 43.209167°N 20.654722°E
- Baljevac (mountain)/Valjevac 43.204444°N 20.673056°E
- Obrž 43.245556°N 20.745278°E
- Srednji Breg 43.246667°N 20.8°E
- Milanov Vrh 43.266667°N 20.816667°E next to Pančićev vrh

Following the Tip on the left side :

- Vojetin/Vogetin 43.251667°N 20.850556°E
- Vrletnica 43.224167°N 20.876667°E
- Strana (peak) 43.2075°N 20.872778°E
- Čukara 43.204167°N 20.836944°E
- Veliki Deo 43.185556°N 20.844444°E

== See also ==
- Geography of Kosovo
- List of lakes in Kosovo
