= Crnkamenska Kula =

Mountain found in Kosovo

Coordinates: 41.900556°N 20.663889°E

Crnkamenska Kula (Albanian: Kamenkullë) is a mountain found in Kosovo in the Šar Mountains in Gora next to North Macedonia and Albania. Crnkamenska Kula reaches a top height of 2,117 m (6,946 ft). The nearest peaks are Crn Kamen, Krstila, Krusevacka Planina, Murga and Popova Sapka, the next town is Brod (Prizren), the next biggest lake is Šutmansko Lake. It is one of the higher peaks in Kosovo.
