= Mramor (mountain) =

Mountain peak in Kosovo

- Мрамор
- Location within Kosovo

Highest point
- Elevation: 2,298 m (7,539 ft)
- Coordinates: 41.908056°N 20.732222°E

Geography
- Country: Kosovo
- Parent range: Sharr Mountains

Mramor is a mountain peak in Kosovo in the Šar Mountains in the Gora (region) next to North Macedonia and Albania. Mramor reaches a top height of 2,298 m (7,539 ft). The nearest peaks are Ovčinec, Murga (peak) and Titov Vrv. The next town is Brod (Prizren). The next biggest lake is Šutmansko Lake. It is one of the higher peaks in Kosovo.

== See also ==
- List of mountains in Kosovo
- National parks of Kosovo
