= Ćule =

Mountain found in Kosovo

- Qula
- Location within Kosovo

Highest point
- Elevation: 2,220 m (7,280 ft)
- Coordinates: 41.987222°N 20.739722°E

Geography
- Location: Kosovo
- Parent range: Šar Mountains

Ćule (Albanian: Qula)is a mountain found in Kosovo in the Šar Mountains in Gora (region) next to North Macedonia and Albania. Ćule reaches a top height of 2,220 m (7,283 ft). The nearest peaks are Ovčinec, Murga (peak) and Titov Vrv, the next town is Brod (Prizren), the next biggest lake is Šutmansko Lake. It is one of the higher peaks in Kosovo.
