= Kruševačka Planina =

Mountain in Kosovo

Coordinates: 41.909444°N 20.616111°E

Kruševačka Planina (Maja e Krushevaçkës in Albanian) is a mountain found in Kosovo in the Šar Mountains in Gora (region) next to North Macedonia and Albania. Kruševačka Planina reaches a peak altitude of 2,048 m (6,719 ft). The nearest peaks are Murga (peak) and Popova Sapka, the next town is Brod (Prizren), the next biggest lake is Šutmansko Lake. It is one of the highest peaks in Kosovo.
