= Crni Vrh (Brod) =

Mountain in Kosovo

Coordinates: 41.975°N 20.687°E

Crni Vrh (Albanian: Maja e Zezë) is a mountain found in Kosovo in the Brodska Planina part of the Šar Mountains in Gora (region) next to North Macedonia and Albania. Ćule reaches a top height of 2,063 m (6,768 ft). The nearest peaks are Lisičji Kamen, Oblo, Toarnik, Rudina (mountain), Žoutica, Morava (mountain), Osoje, Papka, the ridge Popov Rid, the cliffs Gradski Kamen, Popovica (mountain), Borić (mountain), Zeneto Brdo, Sulejmanica the next town is Brod (Prizren), the next biggest lake is Šutmansko Lake. It is one of the higher peaks in Kosovo.

It is not to be confused with the higher Black Peak, Šar Mountains which is to the north.
