= Crn Kamen =

Mountain found in Kosovo

Coordinates: 41.891667°N 20.689167°E

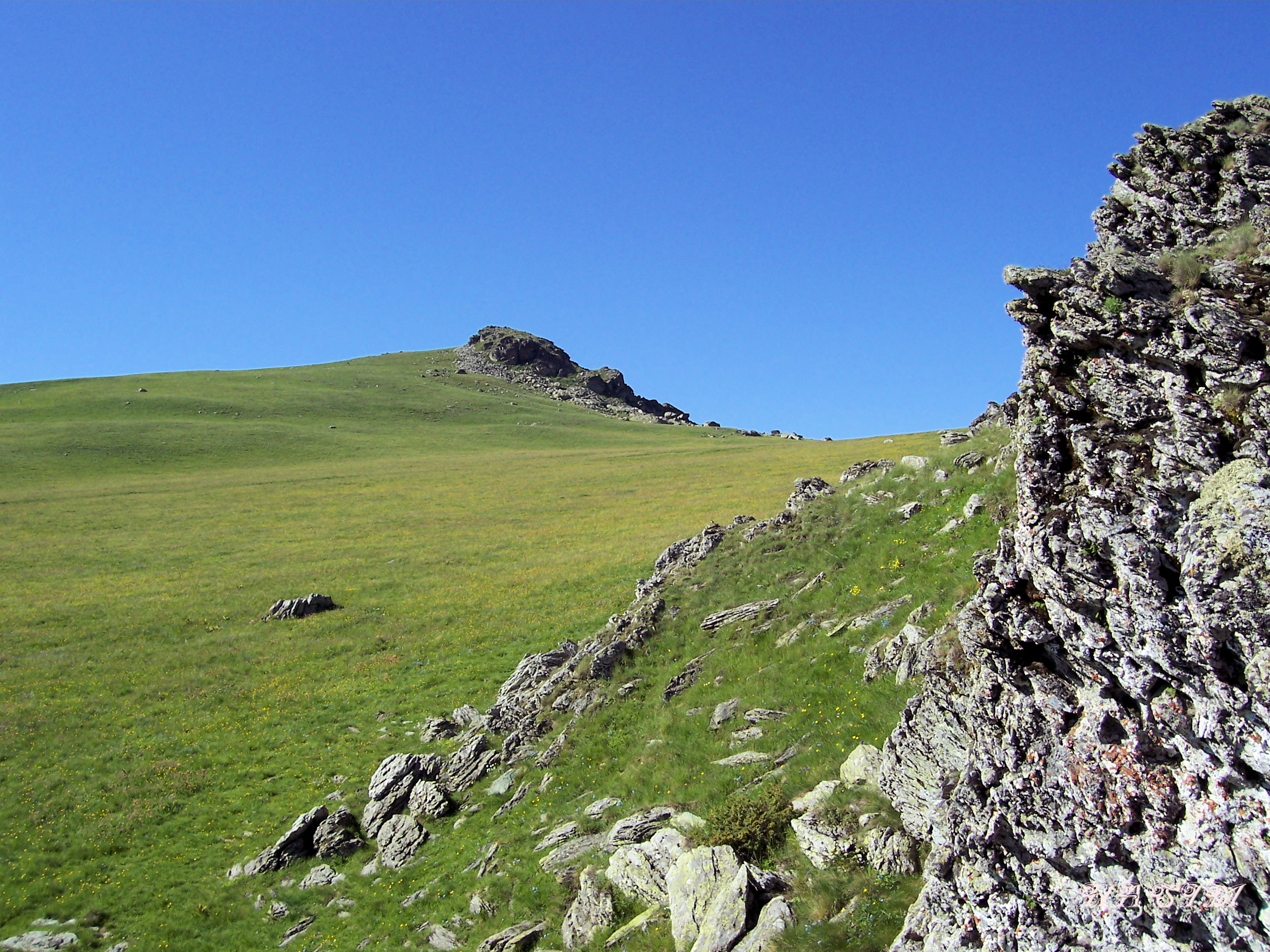
CRN KAMEN

Crn Kamen ( Guri i Zi in Albanian) is a mountain found in Kosovo in the Šar Mountains in Gora next to North Macedonia and Albania. Crn Kamen reaches a top height of 2,051 m (6,729 ft).

The nearest peaks are Murga and Popova Sapka. The nearest town is Brod, and the nearest lake is Shutman Lake. It is one of the higher peaks in Kosovo.
