= Maja e Vjelakut =

Mountain peak in Kosovo

- Serbian: Волујак
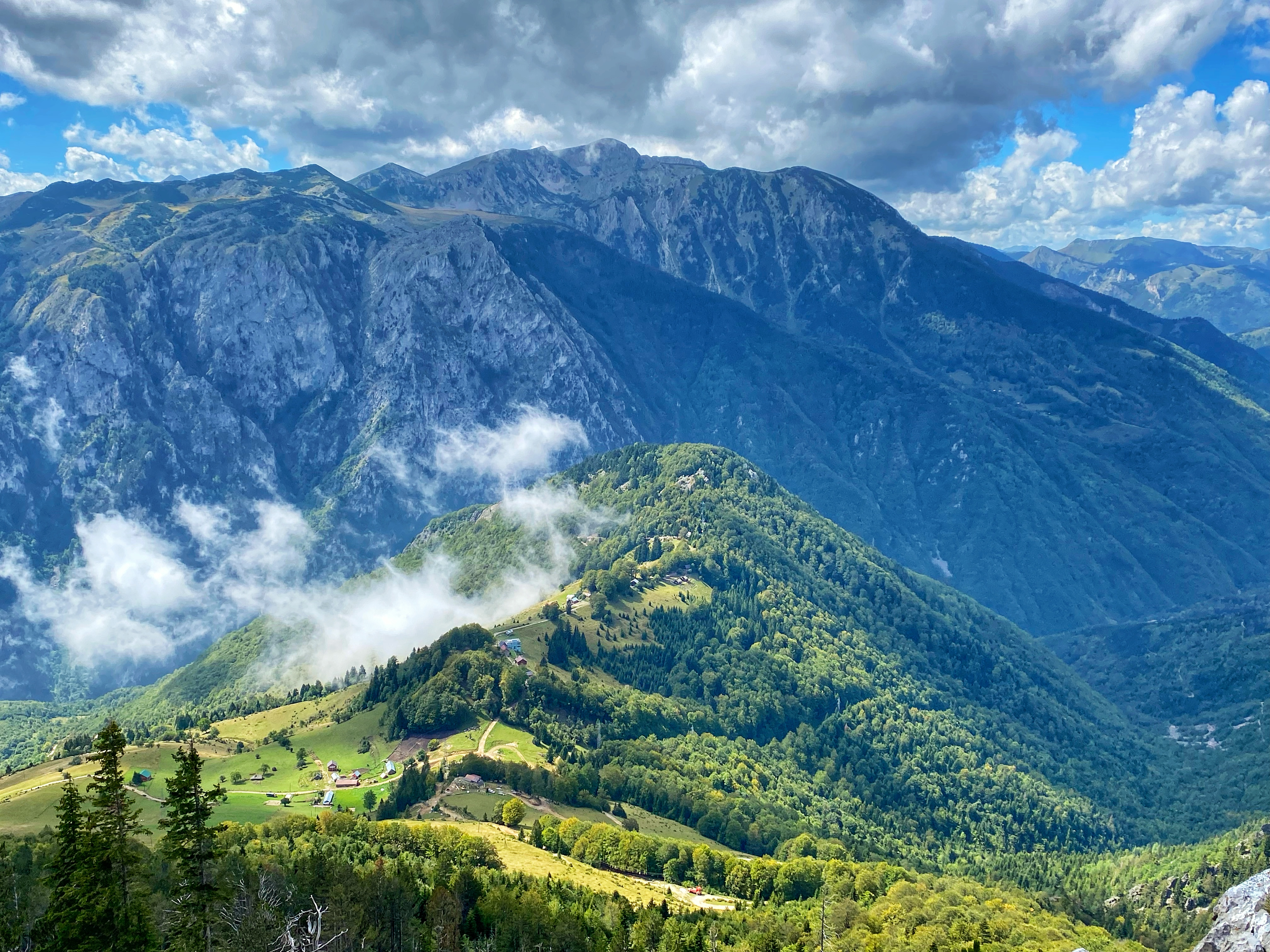
- Image taken while walking along the path to Maja e Vjelakut

Highest point
- Elevation: 2,014 m (6,608 ft)
- Coordinates: 42°41′23″N 20°13′35″E

Naming
- Language of name: Albanian

Geography
- Location within Kosovo
- Location: Pejë, Kosovo
- Parent range: Accursed Mountains

Maja e Vjelakut is a mountain peak of the Accursed Mountains in Kosovo, reaching a top height of 2,014 m (6,608 ft). Maja e Vjelakut is part of the Rugova Canyon. This mountain peak it is only a few kilometers west of the city of Peja and can be seen from it.

== See also ==
- List of mountains in Kosovo
- National parks of Kosovo
