= Peja Bistrica =

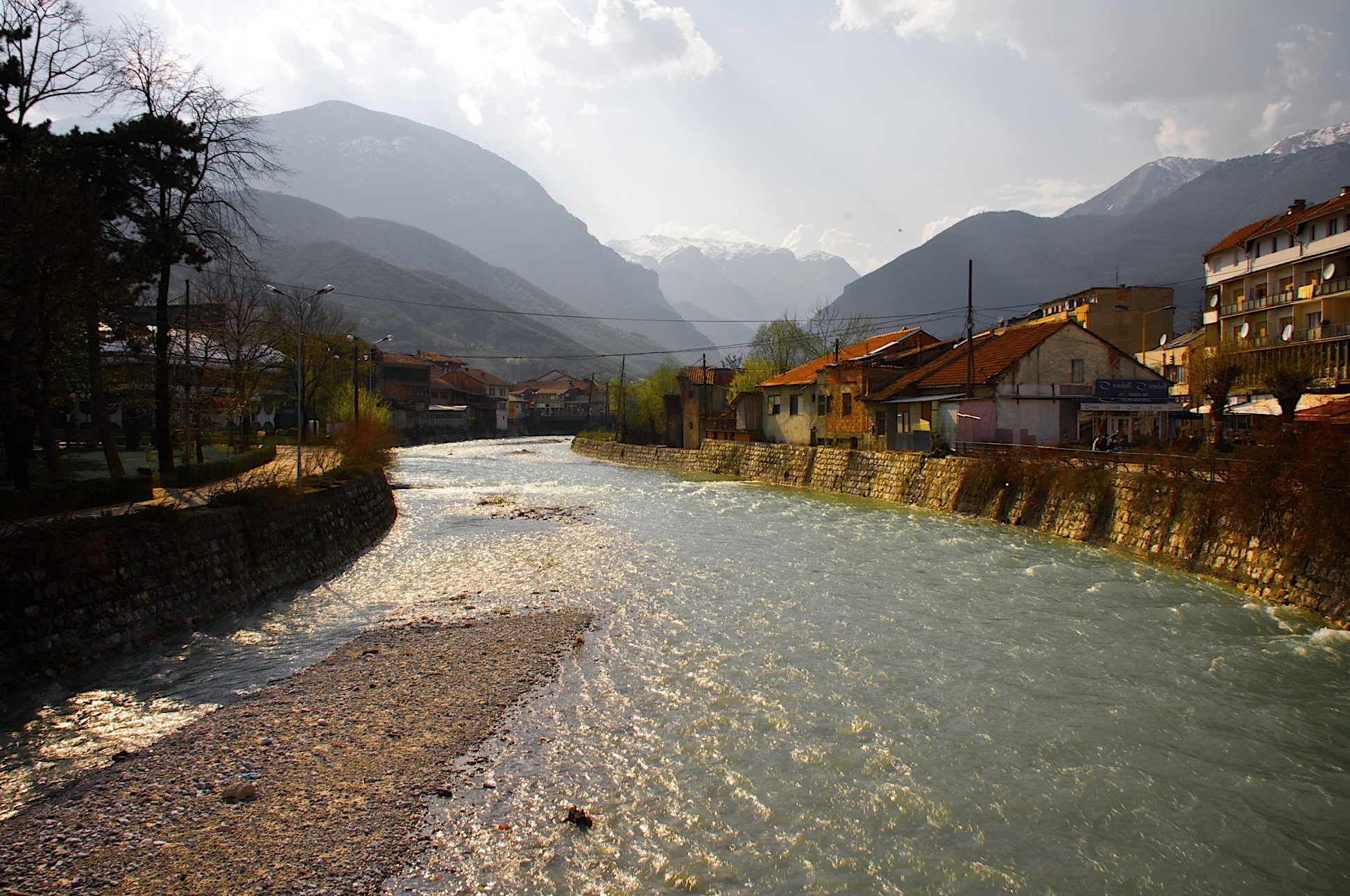
- Lumbardhi i Pejës in Peja
- Native name: Lumbardhi i Pejës (Albanian); Bistrica e Pejës (Albanian); Пећка Бистрица (Serbian); Pećka Bistrica (Serbian)

Location
- Country: Kosovo

Physical characteristics
- Source
  - location: Mokra mountain, near the Kosovo-Montenegrin border
  - elevation: 1,900 m (6,200 ft)
- Mouth
  - location: White Drin, south of Klina, Kosovo
  - coordinates: 42.5815°N 20.5684°E
- Length: 62 km (39 mi)
- Basin size: 505 km^{2} (195 sq mi)

Basin features
- Progression: White Drin→ Drin→ Adriatic Sea

The Lumbardhi i Pejës, Peja Bistrica, or Pećka Bistrica (Albanian: Bistrica e Pejës; Serbian: Пећка Бистрица, romanized: Pećka Bistrica), is a river in Kosovo. This 62 km-long right tributary to the White Drin river flows entirely within the south-western part of Kosovo.

== Name ==
The river's name, Lumbardh, literally translates to White River in Albanian. The adjective, i Pejës, differentiates it from the other Lumbardh tributaries of the White Drin (Albanian: Drinit të Bardhë) in the Dukagjini area.

The name Bistrica means "clearwater" in Serbian. The adjective Pećka derived from "Peć", the Serbian version of Peja. It is added to distinguish it from other Bistrica rivers in the region: Deçan Bistrica, Prizren Bistrica, Baba Loc Bistrica, Lloqan Bistrica, etc.

== Upper course ==
Peja's Lumbardh originates from the eastern slopes of the Mokra mountain, on the border of Kosovo and Montenegro, at the elevation of 1,900 m (6,200 ft), in the Rugova region of Dukagjini. It flows to the south and initially receives many small streams coming down from the neighbouring mountains of Hajla, Micinat and Bogićevica. Passing next to the villages of Bogë, Duganjive and Kuqishtë, on the northern tip of the Micinat mountain it turns east into the Rugova gorge.

== Rugova Gorge ==
The short but powerful Lumbardhi i Pejës carved the impressive Rugova Canyon, between the mountains of Zhleb mountain on the north, and Kopranik, the northern extension of the Accursed Mountains, on the south.

The gorge is 23 km long and up to 1,000 m (3,300 ft) deep. The power of the water cut its way not only through the limestone and slate, but also through the terrain made of marble and serpentine. The upper part of the gorge is the glacial trough of the ancient, 25 km-long, Rugova glacier.

The gorge is sparsely inhabited (the village of Shtupeq i Vogël).

== Lower course ==
As it comes out of the gorge, Peja's Lumbardh reaches the town of Peja and enters the bottom of the Dukagjini depression through which it flows for the rest of its course. It runs parallel to the flows of the White Drin to the north and Deçan's Lumbardh to the south, next to the villages of Kastrat, Babiq, Gllavigjicë, Jabllanicë, Grabanicë and Zajm, before it empties into the White Drin south of the town of Klina.

== Characteristics ==
The Lumbardhi i Pejës has a large potential for the production of hydroelectricity, but this resource is not used. Also, the river is known for its abundance in fish, most notably, trout.

The river valley, including the Rugova Canyon, is a route for the road connecting Kosovo with Montenegro, over the Cakor pass.

Through the White Drin, Peja's Lumbardh belongs to the Adriatic Sea drainage basin. The river drains an area of 505 km^{2} (195 sq mi) itself and it is not navigable.

== See also ==
- Peja
- White Drin
