= Lisičji Kamen =

Mountain in Kosovo

Coordinates: 41.969167°N 20.687222°E

Lisičji Kamen (also known as Guri i Dhelprës in Albanian) is a mountain in Kosovo, in the Šar Mountains in Gora next to North Macedonia and Albania. Lisičji Kamen reaches a top height of 2,010 m (6,594 ft). The nearest peaks are Ovčinec, the next town is Brod (Prizren), the next biggest lake is Šutmansko Lake. It is one of the higher peaks in Kosovo.
