= Bardhalevë =

Mountain in Kosovo and North Macedonia

- Location within Kosovo

Highest point
- Elevation: 2,334 m (7,657 ft)
- Coordinates: 41°59′N 20°44′E

Naming
- Language of name: Albanian

Geography
- Location: Kosovo and North Macedonia
- Parent range: Sharr Mountains

Geology
- Mountain type: Fold mountain

Bardhalevë is a mountain peak in the border between Kosovo and North Macedonia. The peak is part of the Sharr Mountains. Bardhalevë has an altitude of 2,334 m (7,657 ft) and it is part of the Sharr Mountains National Park.

== See also ==
- List of mountains in Kosovo
- National parks of Kosovo
