= Shapka =

Shapka or Šapka (Шапка in Russian, Ukrainian, Bulgarian and Macedonian languages) means a fur cap or a mountain peak in several Slavic languages.

- Russian fur hat, also known as ushanka
- Kęstutis Šapka (1949–2025), Lithuanian high jumper
- Popova Šapka, a peak in Macedonia

== See also ==
- Czapka, a Polish and Belarusian word for a cap, also a name for 19th-century Polish cavalry headgear
