= Piribeg =

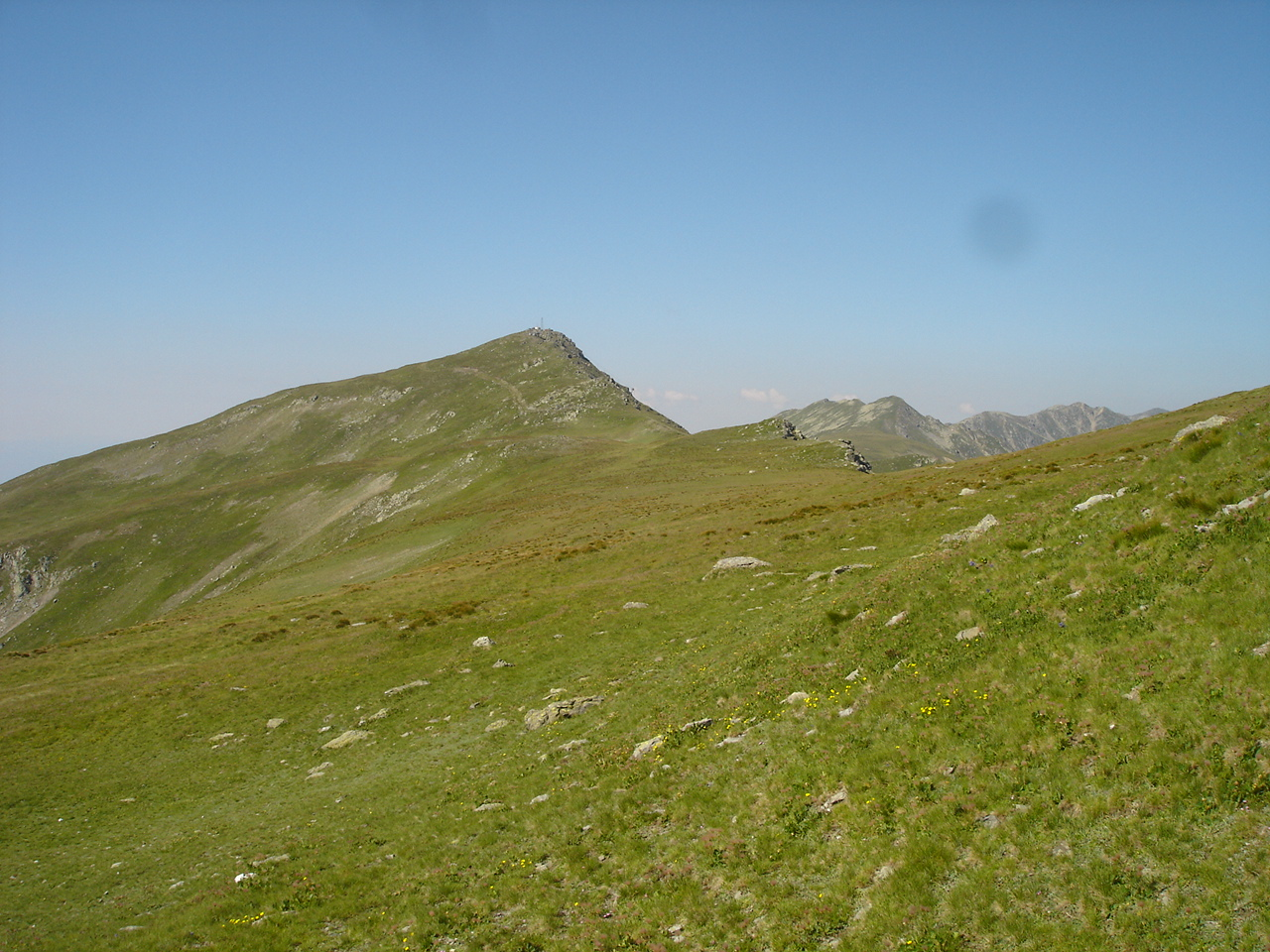

Highest point
- Elevation: 2,524 m (8,281 ft)
- Coordinates: 42°9′58″N 21°2′57″E

Geography
- Location within Kosovo
- Countries: Kosovo; North Macedonia
- Parent range: Sharr Mountains

Piribeg (Albanian: Piribeg; Macedonian: Пирибег) is a mountain peak located in the border between Kosovo and North Macedonia. Piribeg reaches a height of 2,524 m (8,281 ft) meters above sea level, and is a peak of the eastern part of the Šar Mountains.

Located on the slopes of Piribeg is the largest ski center in Kosovo, Brezovica.

== See also ==
- List of mountains in Kosovo
- List of mountains in North Macedonia
- National parks of Kosovo
