= Kallabaku =

Mountain near the border of Albania and Kosovo

- Mali i Kallabakut
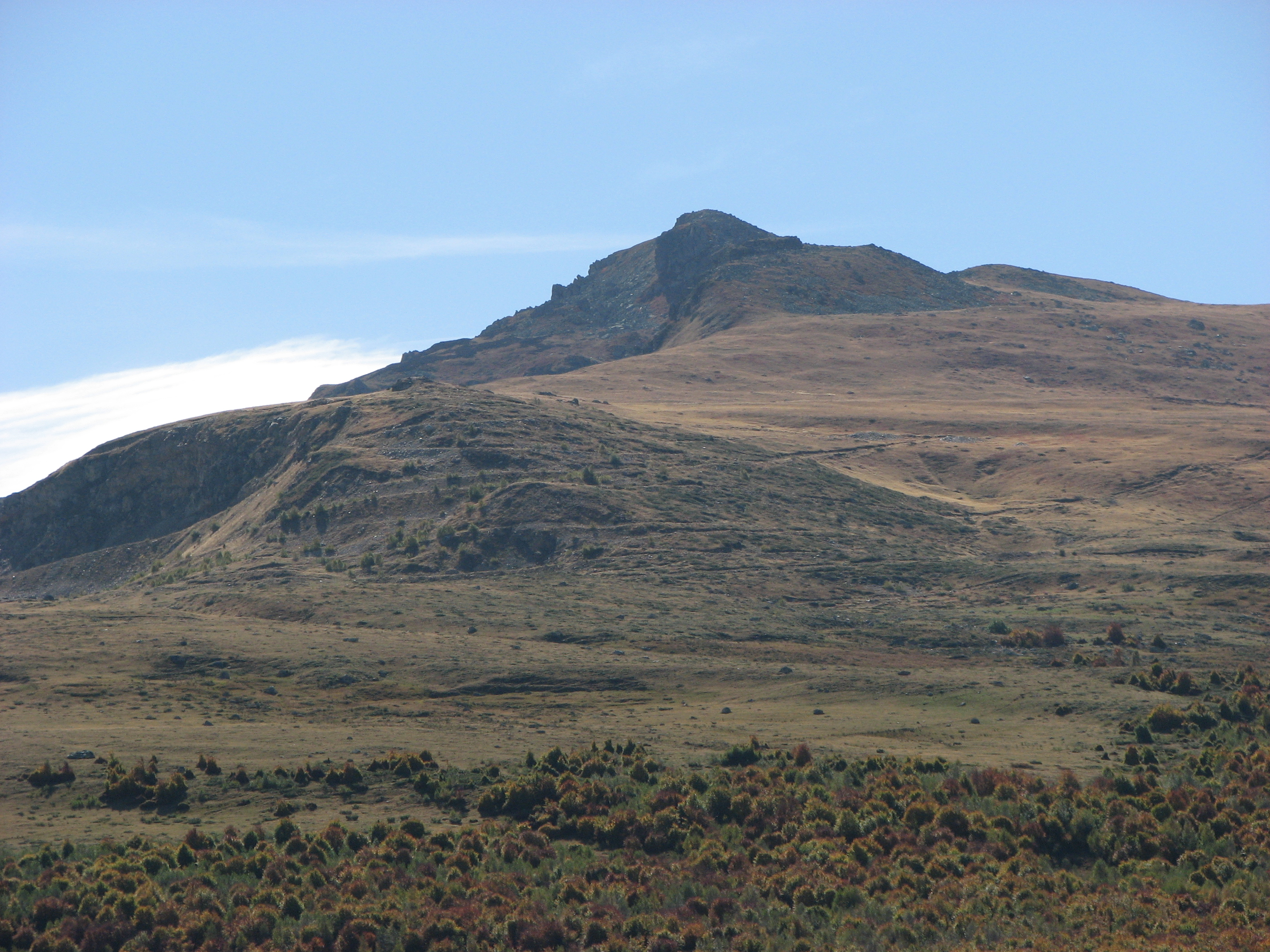
- View of Mali i Kallabakut

Highest point
- Elevation: 2,174 m (7,133 ft)
- Prominence: 340 m (1,120 ft)
- Isolation: 8.3 km (5.2 mi)
- Coordinates: 41°55′02″N 20°34′31″E

Geography
- Location within Albania Location within Kosovo
- Countries: Albania; Kosovo
- Region: Central Mountain Region
- Municipality: Kukës
- Parent range: Shishtavec Plateau

Geology
- Mountain type: mountain

Kallabaku is a mountain situated on the grassy hills along the border region of Albania and Kosovo. It is in close proximity to the villages of Shishtavec, Novoselë and Turaj, which are home to the Gorani people, a linguistic minority residing in Albania. Reaching a height of 2,174 m (7,133 ft), Kallabaku is the highest peak north of the Korab range.

== Geology ==
The mountain rises about 200 m (660 ft) above the extended ridge which divides the Luma river basin to the north from the Çaja river basin to the south. It serves as the main crest of the Shishtavec Plateau mountain range, stretching for 15 km (9.3 mi) in length and up to 11 km (6.8 mi) in width. As tributaries of the Drin river, the Luma and Çaja rivers have carved narrow gorges, forming a unique pathway through the terrain. Winter brings substantial snowfall, often resulting in the isolation of the nearby villages from the outside world, with the snow persisting well into spring and summer.

== Biodiversity ==
The area surrounding Kallabaku is characterized by treeless grasslands extending up to the summit. Towards the northeast, the mountain descends steeply into a cirque, giving it a distinctive shape, which offers wide-ranging vistas and favorable conditions for horse and cattle grazing. On the Albania side, the mountain falls within the Korab-Koritnik Nature Park, while on the Kosovo side, it lies within the boundaries of the Sharr Mountains National Park. Located approximately three kilometers north of the mountain, a small lake and the adjacent birch forest known as Mështekna e Shishtavecit have been designated as a protected natural monument since 2002.

== See also ==
- List of mountains in Albania
- List of mountains in Kosovo
