= Kleç =

Mountain peak in Kosovo and North Macedonia

- Клеч
- Location within Kosovo

Highest point
- Elevation: 2,414 m (7,920 ft)
- Coordinates: 42°1′40″N 20°45′0″E

Naming
- Pronunciation: Albanian pronunciation: [klɛtʃ]

Geography
- Location: Dragash, Kosovo
- Countries: Kosovo; North Macedonia
- Parent range: Sharr Mountains

Kleç (Macedonian: Клеч) is a mountain peak in the Sharr Mountains in the border between Kosovo and North Macedonia. Kleç has an altitude of 2,414 m (7,920 ft) and it is among the highest peaks of the Sharr Mountains. Kleç is, administratively, located between the municipality of Dragash and that of Tetovë.

== See also ==
- List of mountains in Kosovo
- National parks of Kosovo
