= Cërrnushë =

Peak in Kosovo

- Location within Kosovo

Highest point
- Elevation: 1,016 m (3,333 ft)
- Coordinates: 42°53′8″N 20°55′5″E

Geography
- Location: Mitrovica
- Country: Kosovo
- Parent range: Kopaonik

Cërrnushë (Albanian definite form: Cërrnusha) is a peak in the municipality of Mitrovica, Kosovo. It has an altitude of 1,016 metres (3,333 ft) and it is part of the Kopaonik range.

== See also ==
- Mountains of Kosovo
