= Maja e Bardhë =

Mountain peak in Albania and Kosovo

- Location within Albania Location within Kosovo

Highest point
- Elevation: 2,426 m (7,959 ft)
- Coordinates: 42°32′03″N 20°05′52″E

Geography
- Location: Tropojë, Albania; Junik, Kosovo
- Countries: Albania; Kosovo
- Parent range: Albanian Alps

Geology
- Mountain type: Fold mountain

Maja e Bardhë is a mountain peak in the border between Albania and Kosovo. The peak is part of the Albanian Alps. Maja e Bardhë has an altitude of 2,426 m (7,959 ft).

The peak is part of the Bjeshkët e Nemuna National Park in Kosovo, as well as the Gashi Valley protected area in Albania. North of the peak originates the Lumbardhi i Deçanit river, a right tributary of White Drin.

== See also ==
- List of mountains in Kosovo
- List of mountains in Albania
- Bjeshkët e Nemuna National Park
- National parks of Kosovo
