= Guri i Çarë =

Mountain peak in Kosovo

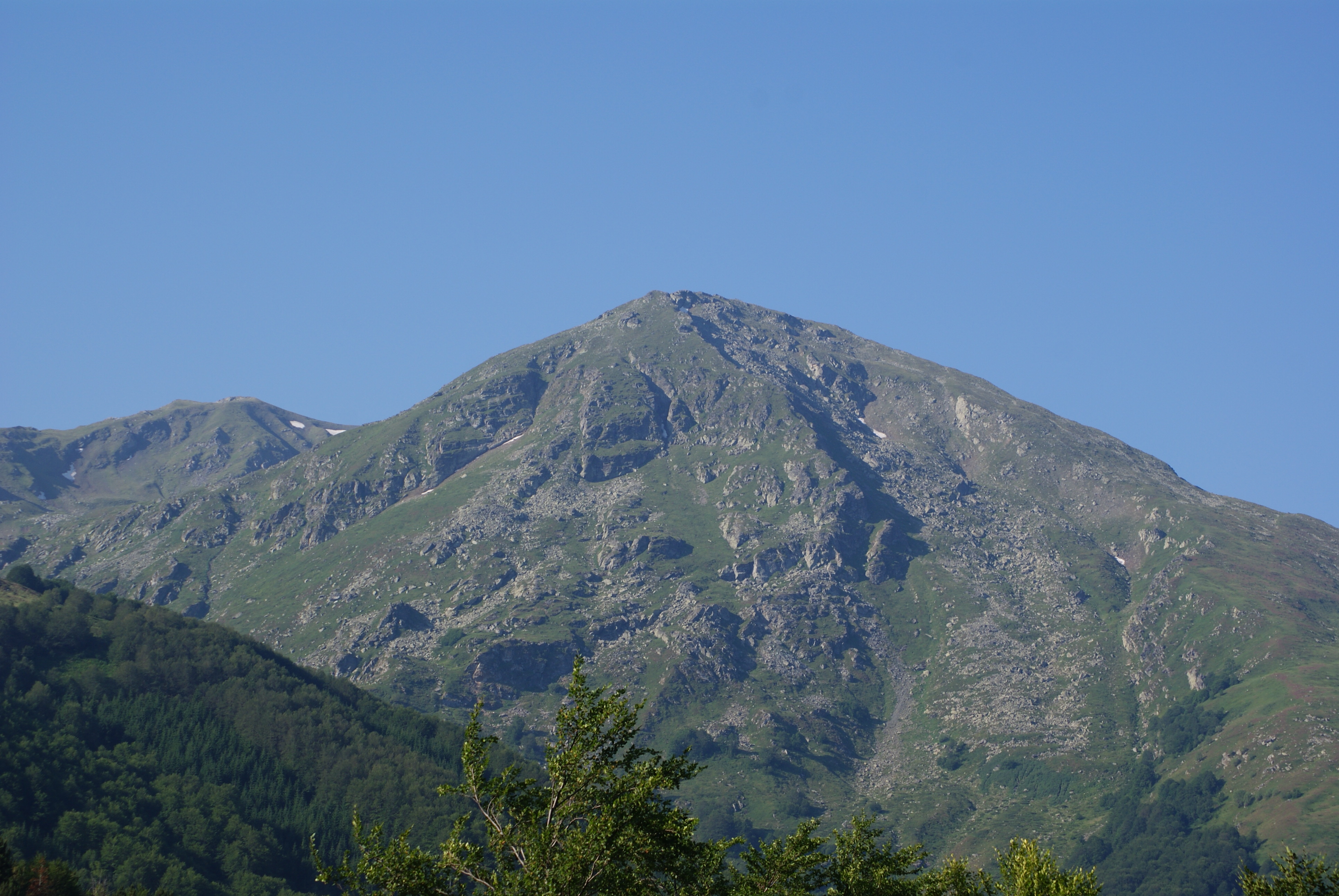
- Guri i Çarë peak from Prevalla

Highest point
- Elevation: 2,466 m (8,091 ft)
- Coordinates: 42°8′41″N 20°56′54″E

Naming
- Language of name: Albanian

Geography
- Location within Kosovo
- Location: Prizren, Kosovo
- Parent range: Sharr Mountains

Guri i Çarë (Gheg Albanian: Guri i Çam) is a mountain peak in the Sharr Mountains in Kosovo. It has an altitude of 2,466 m (8,091 ft).

== See also ==
- List of mountains in Kosovo
- National parks of Kosovo
