= Maja e Begut =

Mountain peak in Kosovo

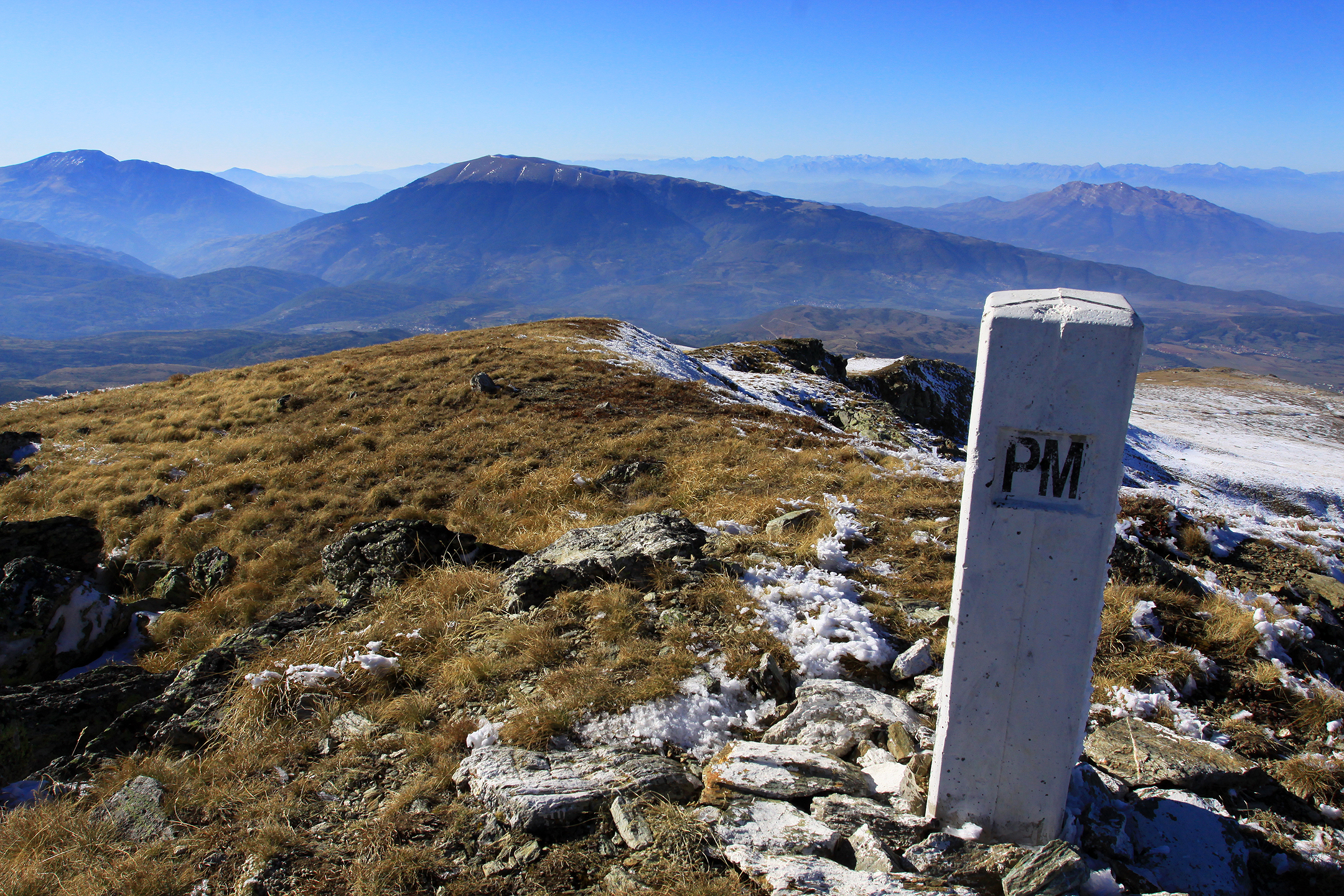
- The view from above the Maja e Begut

Highest point
- Elevation: 2,493 m (8,179 ft)
- Coordinates: 42°02′20″N 20°45′41″E

Geography
- Location within Kosovo
- Location: Dragash, Kosovo
- Parent range: Sharr Mountains

Maja e Begut is a mountain peak in the Sharr Mountains in Kosovo. It has an altitude of 2,493 m (8,179 ft).

== See also ==
- List of mountains in Kosovo
- National parks of Kosovo
