= Žljeb =

Mountain in Kosovo

Zhleb
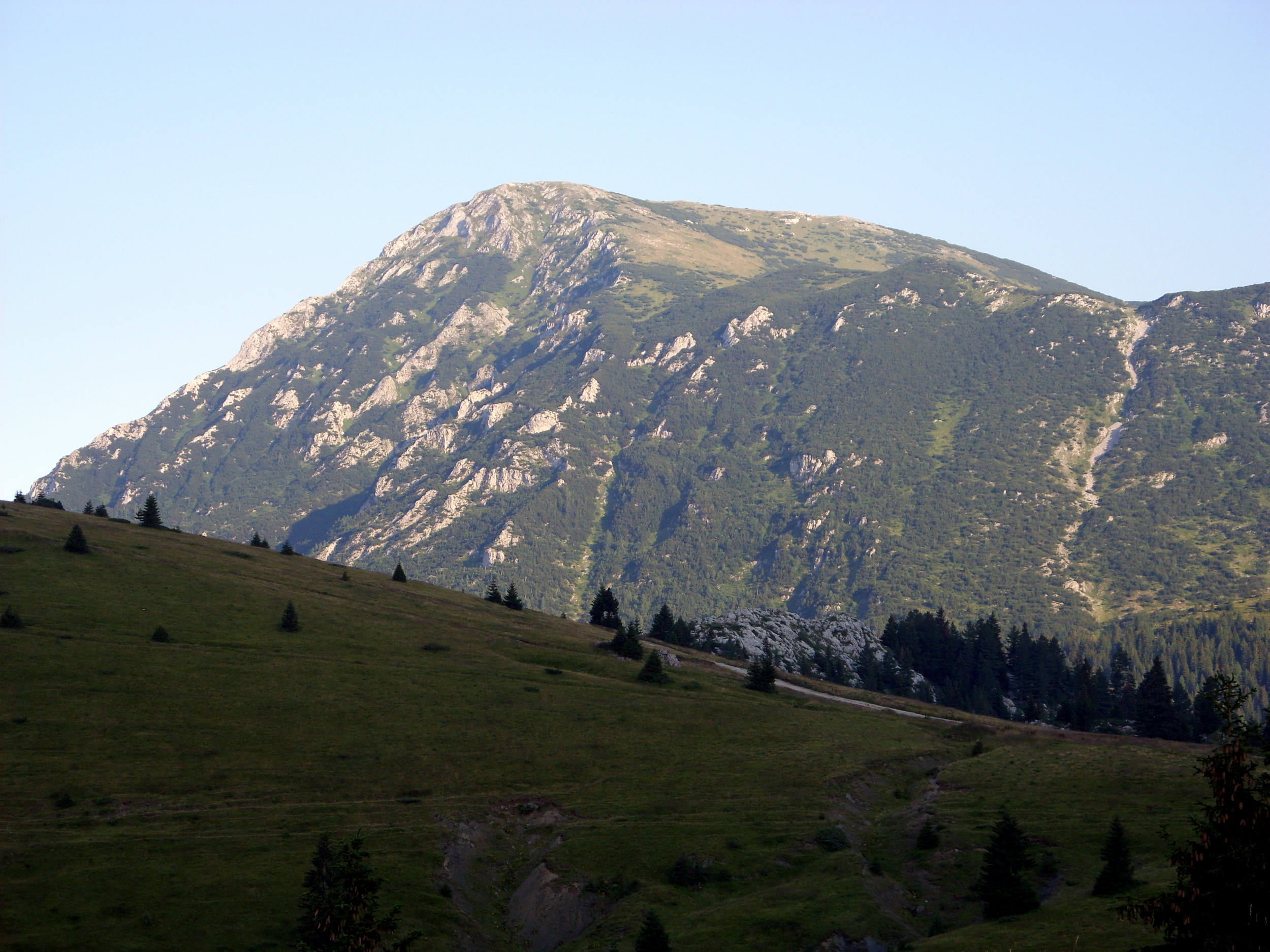
- Zhlebi (2365m)

Highest point
- Elevation: 2,382 m (7,815 ft)
- Coordinates: 42°46′12″N 20°15′12″E

Geography
- Location within Kosovo Location within Montenegro
- Location: Kosovo, Montenegro
- Parent range: Accursed Mountains

Žljeb (Albanian: Zhleb; Montenegrin: Жљеб) is a mountain located between western Kosovo and the Rožaje Municipality of eastern Montenegro. It is a part of the Accursed Mountains, located between the mountains of Hajla and Mokna. The majority of the land within the mountain belongs to Kosovo, while a minority of it belongs to Montenegro. The White Drin river originates from within the mountain.

The Žljeb mountain also forms part of the eastern side of the Rugova Canyon. It also has two high and impressive peaks: the higher is called Rusolia and is 2,382 m (7,815 ft) high, while the lower is simply called Zhlebit, at 2,365 m (7,759 ft). Rusolia's slopes are covered with rich forests and near the summit there are several meadows. The road from the city of Rožaje to Peja is located within the foothills of the mountains, and also contains 2 or 3 villages within that road. It also contains the border crossings between Montenegro and Kosovo, the Montenegrin one is called "Kula/Kulla".
