= Maja e Arnenit Strict Nature Reserve =

Nature reserve in Southeastern Kosovo

- IUCN category Ia (strict nature reserve)
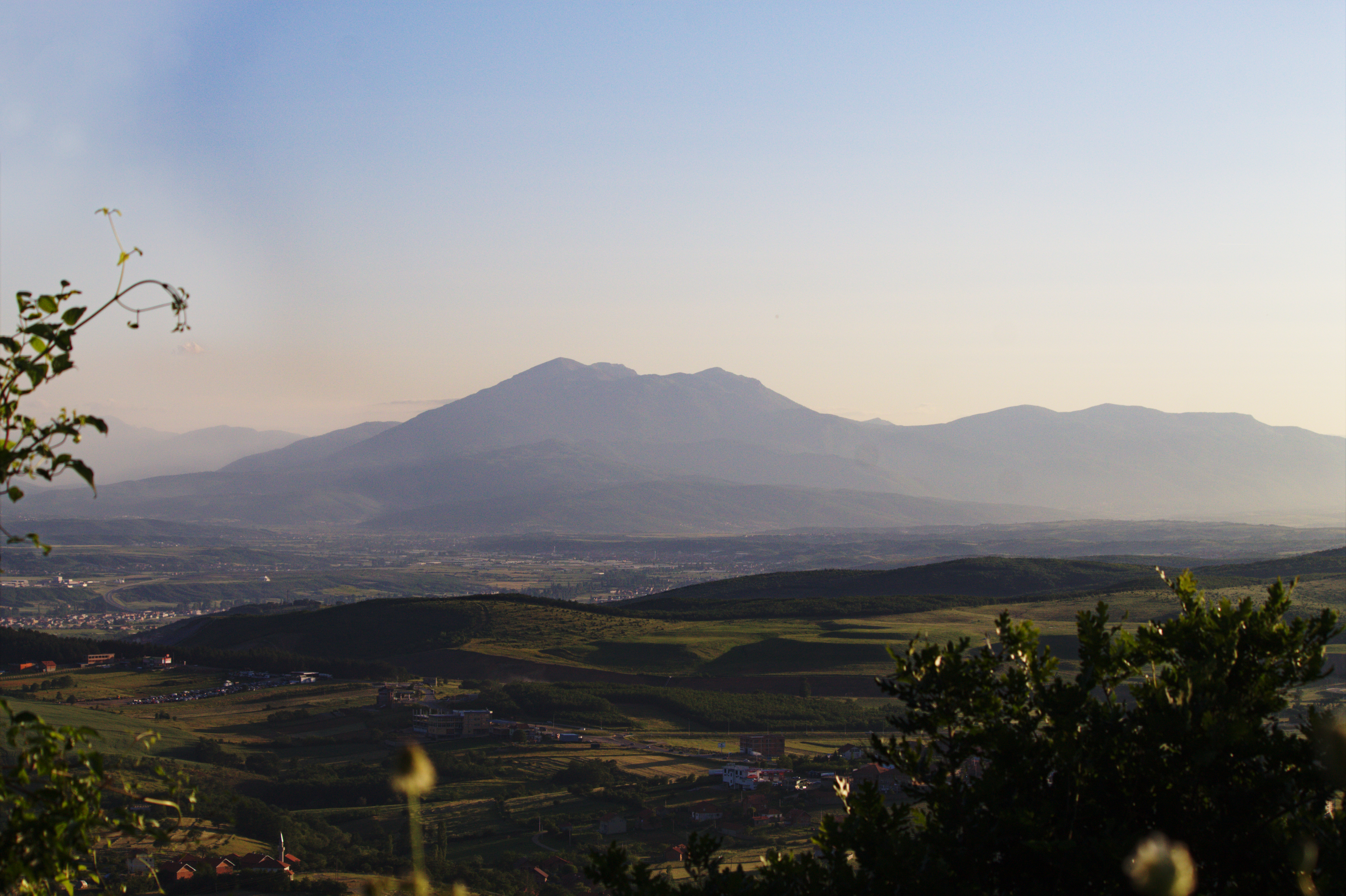
- Maja e Arnenit

- Location within Kosovo Location within Europe
- Location: District of Prizren, Kosovo
- Nearest city: Prizren, Suva Reka
- Coordinates: 42°11′7.73″N 20°57′44.81″E
- Area: 30 ha (0.30 km^{2})
- Established: 1960

The Maja e Arnenit Strict Nature Reserve (Albanian: Rezerva Strikte të Natyrës Maja e Arnenit; Serbian: Строги природни резерват Попово прасе / Strogi prirodni rezervat Popovo prase) is a strict nature reserve in the District of Prizren of Southeastern Kosovo. Maja e Arnenit has an area of 30 hectares (74 acres).

== See also ==
- Protected areas of Kosovo
- Geography of Kosovo
- Biodiversity of Kosovo
