= Rusolia =

Mountain peak in Kosovo

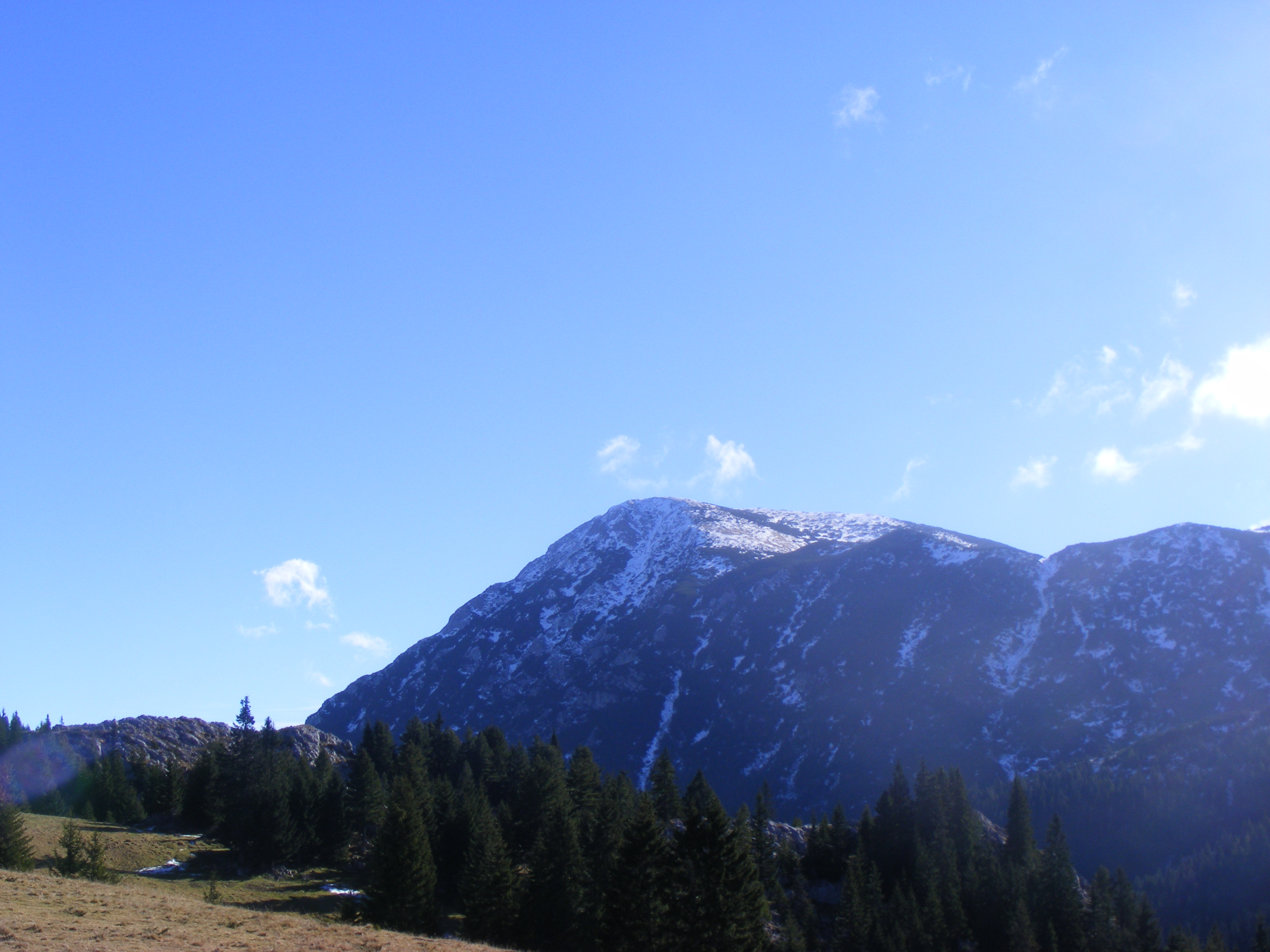
- Northern side of the Rusolia summit

Highest point
- Elevation: 2,382 m (7,815 ft)
- Coordinates: 42°44′59″N 20°14′43″E

Geography
- Location within Kosovo
- Country: Kosovo
- District: District of Peja
- Subdivision: Peja
- Parent range: Accursed Mountains

Rusolia is a mountain summit located in the Albanian Alps in the municipality of Peja, in western Kosovo. The peak is 2,382 metres (7,815 ft) high. Rusolia is a popular destination among local hikers and is part of the Via Dinarica hiking trail.

== Geography ==
The Rusolia mountain summit lies on the northern part of Albanian Alps range, also known as Accursed Mountains. The Albanian Alps mountain range is shared between Albania, Kosovo and Montenegro. The landscape around the summit is characterized by grasslands, seasonal blueberry fields, rocky upper slopes, and glacial-karst features which are typical of the range.

The Rusolia summit is part of the Bjeshkët e Nemuna National Park, a 630.28 km^{2} (243.35 sq mi) protected area established in 2012 to protect the alpine ecosystems, their biodiversity and the geological formations of the Albanian Alps in western Kosovo.

== Natural features ==
Rusolia summit is also known for extensive alpine meadows covered with edelweiss (Leontopodium alpinum), commonly known as the Alpine star. During the 1970s, the area was designated an edelweiss nature reserve in order to preserve its unique floral habitats.

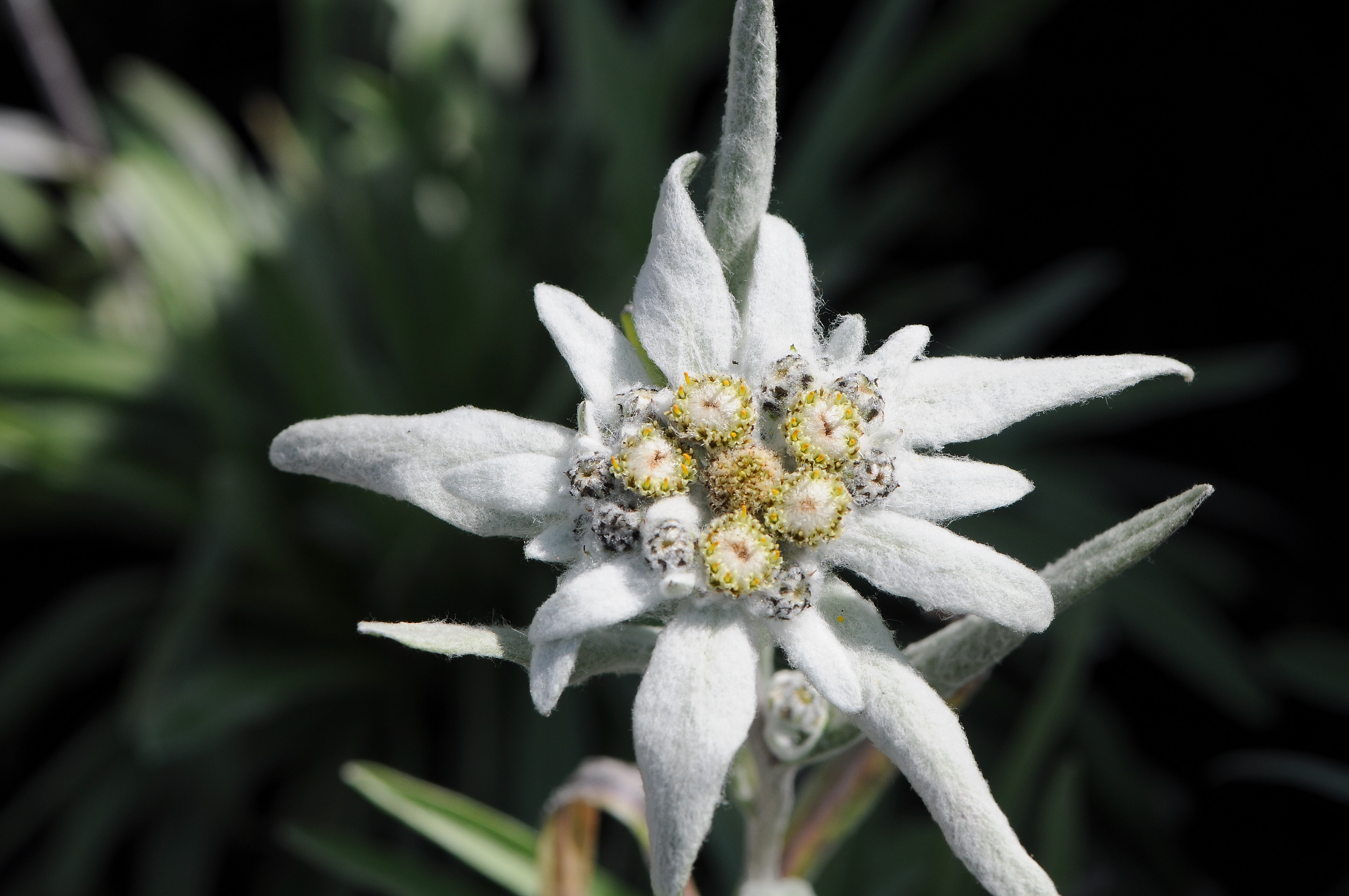
The Edelweiss flower is to be found in the meadows near Rusolia.

At the same time, preliminary studies were done to assess the mountain’s suitability as a potential training site for professional skiers, due to its terrain and snow conditions.

== Hiking ==
A typical round-trip hike to the summit covers approximately 14 km (8.7 mi) to 16 km (9.9 mi). The hike is generally classified as moderate in difficulty and takes approximately 4 to 5 hours. The nearest urban center is the city of Peja.

== Gallery ==
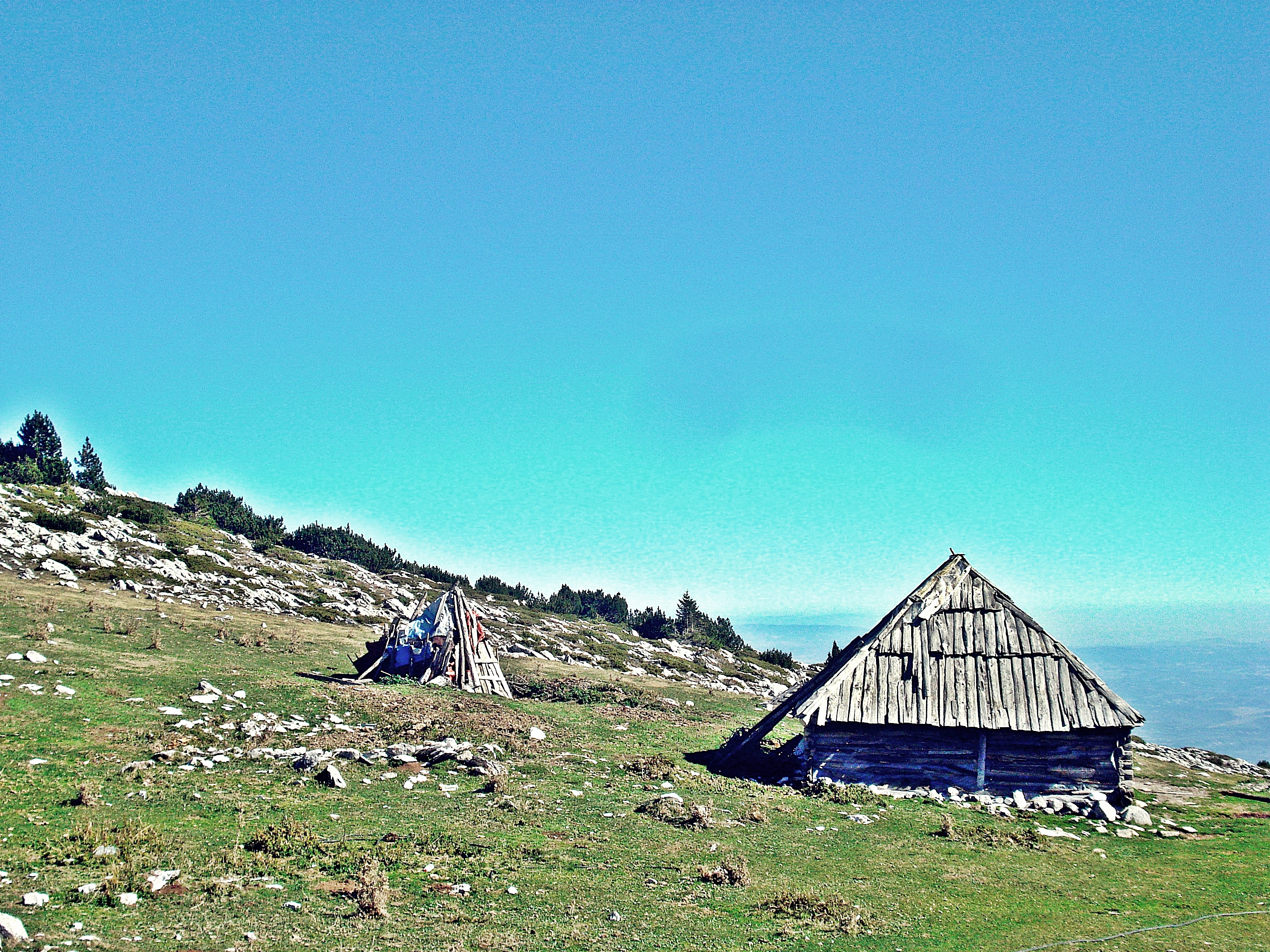
Huts of the seasonal shepherds in the alpine pastures near the summit

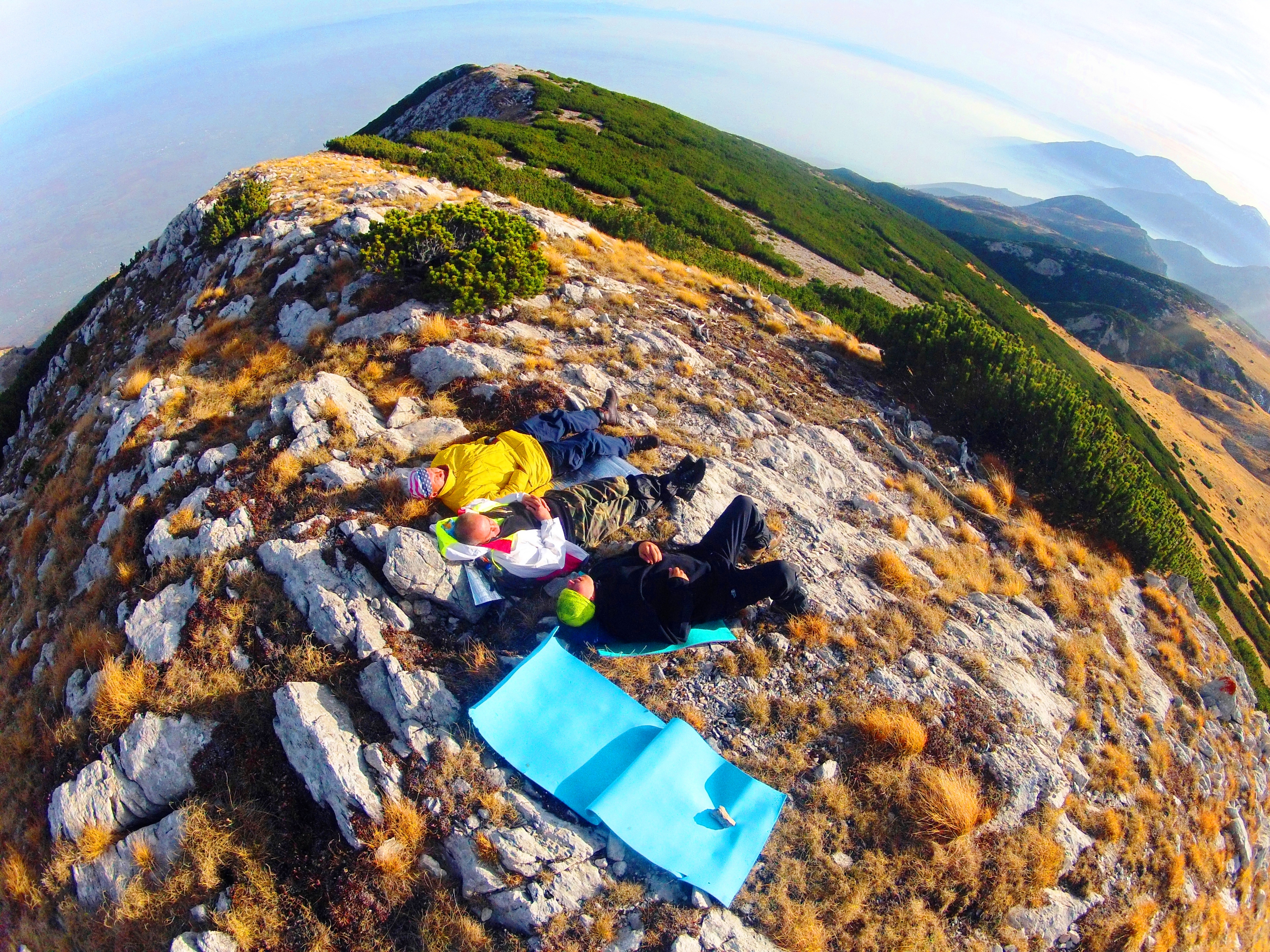
Hikers resting at the summit

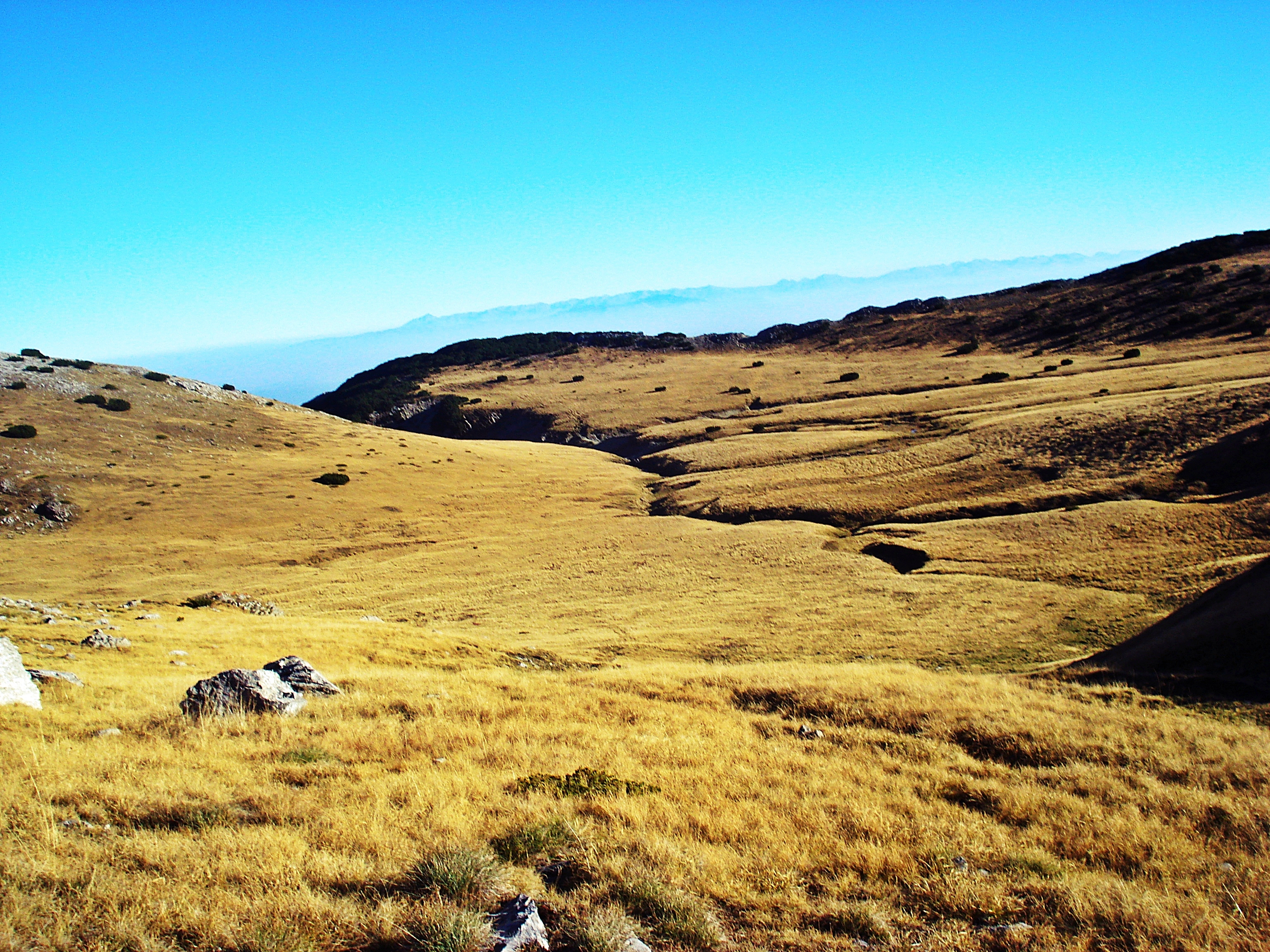
Autumn view of alpine meadows on Rusolia

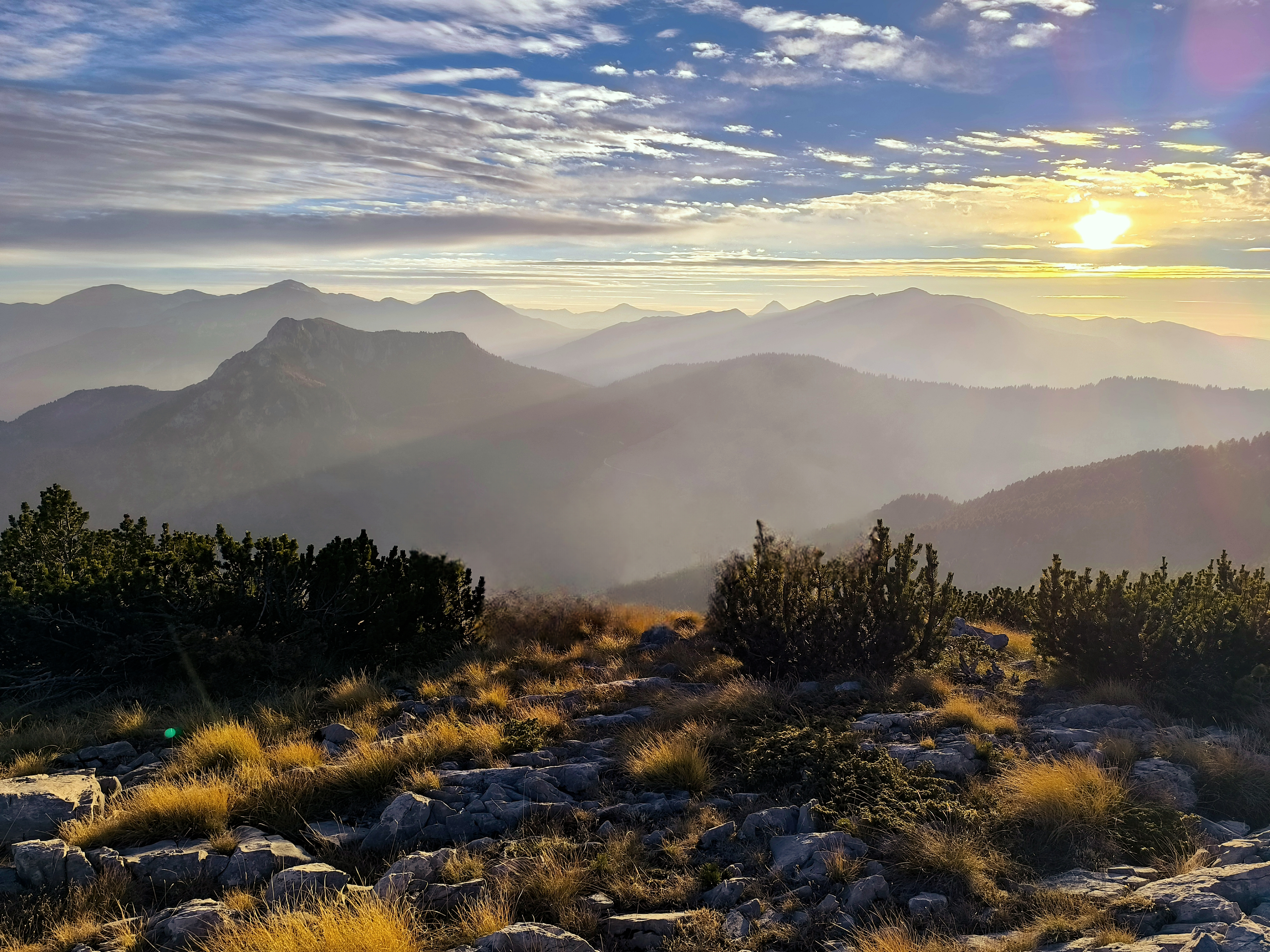
The landscape above the Rusolia summit

== See also ==
- List of mountains in Kosovo
- Bjeshkët e Nemuna National Park
- National parks of Kosovo
