= Studenica, Kosovo =

Peak in the Jezerska planina mountains

Coordinates: 42.310°N 20.984°E

Studenica is a peak found in Kosovo near Suva Reka in the Jezerska planina mountains. Studenica reaches a top height of 1,723 m (5,653 ft).

It is close to Suva Reka and near Guri i Dollocit (Stone of Dolloce) and Antena of Kabash.
