= Veternik Mountain =

Veternik or Veterniku (Albanian: Verternik or Veterniku; Serbian Cyrillic: Ветерник) is a mountain in Kosovo. It is 2,410 m (7,907 ft) high and forms part of the Accursed Mountains. It is located nearby Kopranik, a mountain higher than Veternik but also found in the same range. Veternik differs somewhat from the rest of the Accursed Mountains of Kosovo and resembles more the Albanian part of the range. This is because Veternik's slopes are steep and its limestone is exposed.
