= Zallina =

Mountain in Kosovo and North Macedonia

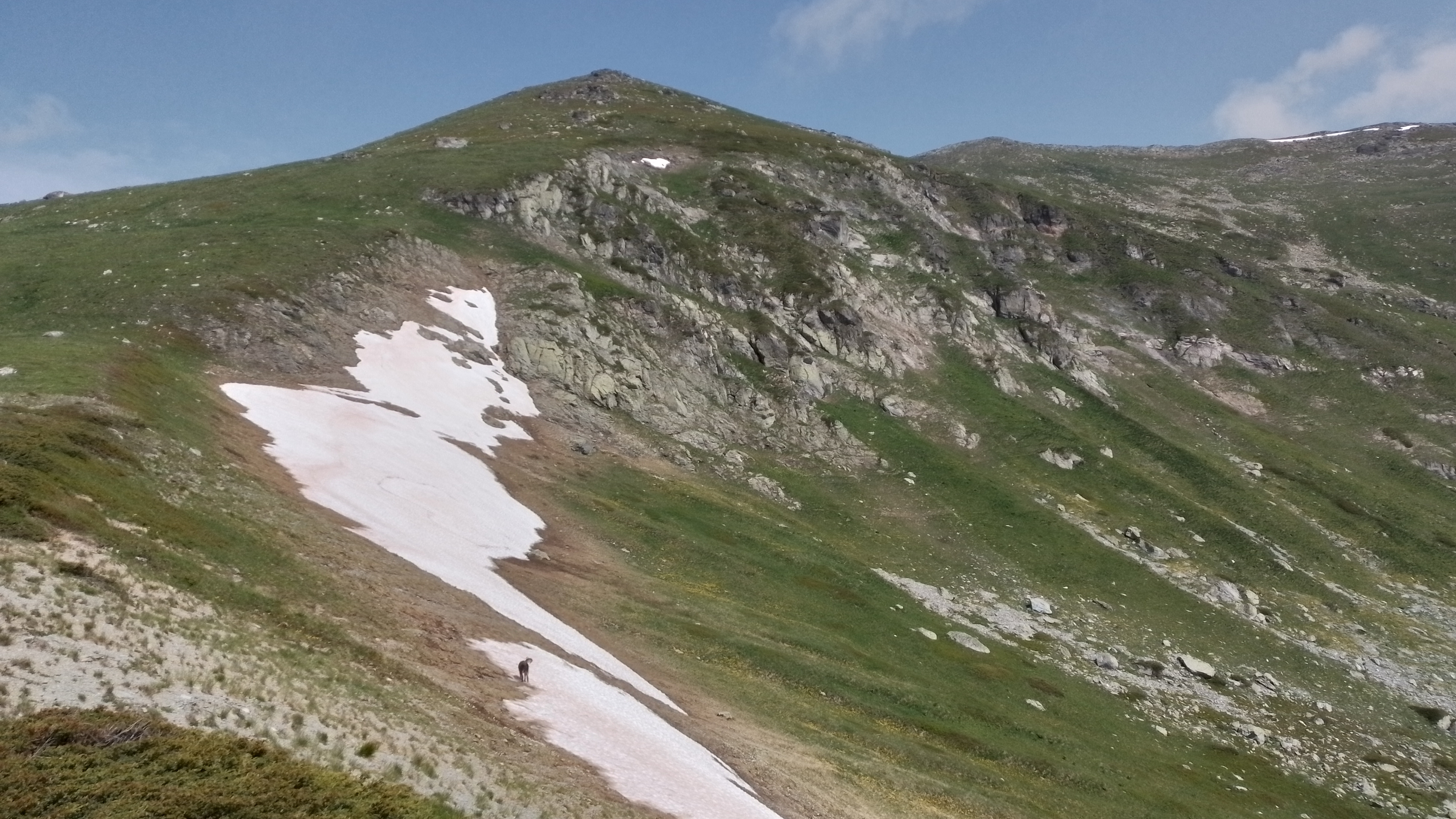

Highest point
- Elevation: 2,493 m (8,179 ft)
- Coordinates: 42°02′20″N 20°45′40″E

Geography
- Location within Kosovo
- Countries: Kosovo; North Macedonia
- Parent range: Sharr Mountains

Geology
- Mountain type: Fold mountain

Zallina (Albanian: Zallinë; Macedonian and Serbian Cyrillic: Залина) is a mountain peak in the border between Kosovo and North Macedonia. Zallina has an altitude of 2,334 m (7,657 ft) and it is part of the Sharr Mountains National Park.
