= Ksulja e Priftit =

Mountain peak in the Šar Mountains

- Location within Kosovo

Highest point
- Elevation: 2,092 m (6,864 ft)
- Prominence: 214 m (702 ft)
- Isolation: 2,940 m (9,650 ft)
- Coordinates: 41°52′38″N 20°35′41″E

Naming
- Nickname: Priest's Cap

Geography
- Countries: Kosovo; Albania; North Macedonia
- Region(s): Prizren, Kukës, Gostivar
- Parent range: Šar Mountains

Geology
- Mountain type: fold mountain

Ksulja e Priftit (Albanian: Priest’s Cap; Macedonian: Шерупа or Šerupa) is a mountain peak in the Šar Mountains, located on the border region between Kosovo, Albania and North Macedonia. The peak reaches an elevation of approximately 2,092 m (6,864 ft) above sea level.

== Geography ==
Ksulja e Priftit is situated near the tripoint where the borders of Kosovo, Albania and North Macedonia converge. It forms part of the central section of the Šar Mountains, a major mountain system in the central Balkans. The mountain’s slopes descend into all three countries, reflecting the transboundary nature of the range.

The surrounding terrain is predominantly alpine, characterized by steep ridges, open grasslands and rocky outcrops. The nearest town is Dragash, located 17.2 km to the north of the peak.

Its summit is defined by a narrow ridge and displays moderate topographic prominence relative to neighboring ridgelines. Rather than standing as an isolated peak, it forms part of a continuous high-mountain landscape.

== Climate ==
The area experiences a mountain continental climate, with cold, snowy winters and mild summers. Snow cover frequently persists at higher elevations well into late spring. The average temperature is 3 °C. The warmest month is August, at 16 °C and the coldest is January, at −10 °C. Average annual precipitation is 1,160 mm. The wettest month is November, with 133 mm of rain, and the driest is August, with 34 mm.

== Biodiversity ==
Vegetation varies with altitude, consisting primarily of montane grasslands and shrub communities at lower elevations, transitioning to sparse alpine vegetation near the summit.

== See also ==
- List of mountains in Kosovo
- List of mountains in Albania
- List of mountains in North Macedonia
