= Ezerski Vrv =

Mountain in Kosovo and North Macedonia

Lake Peak
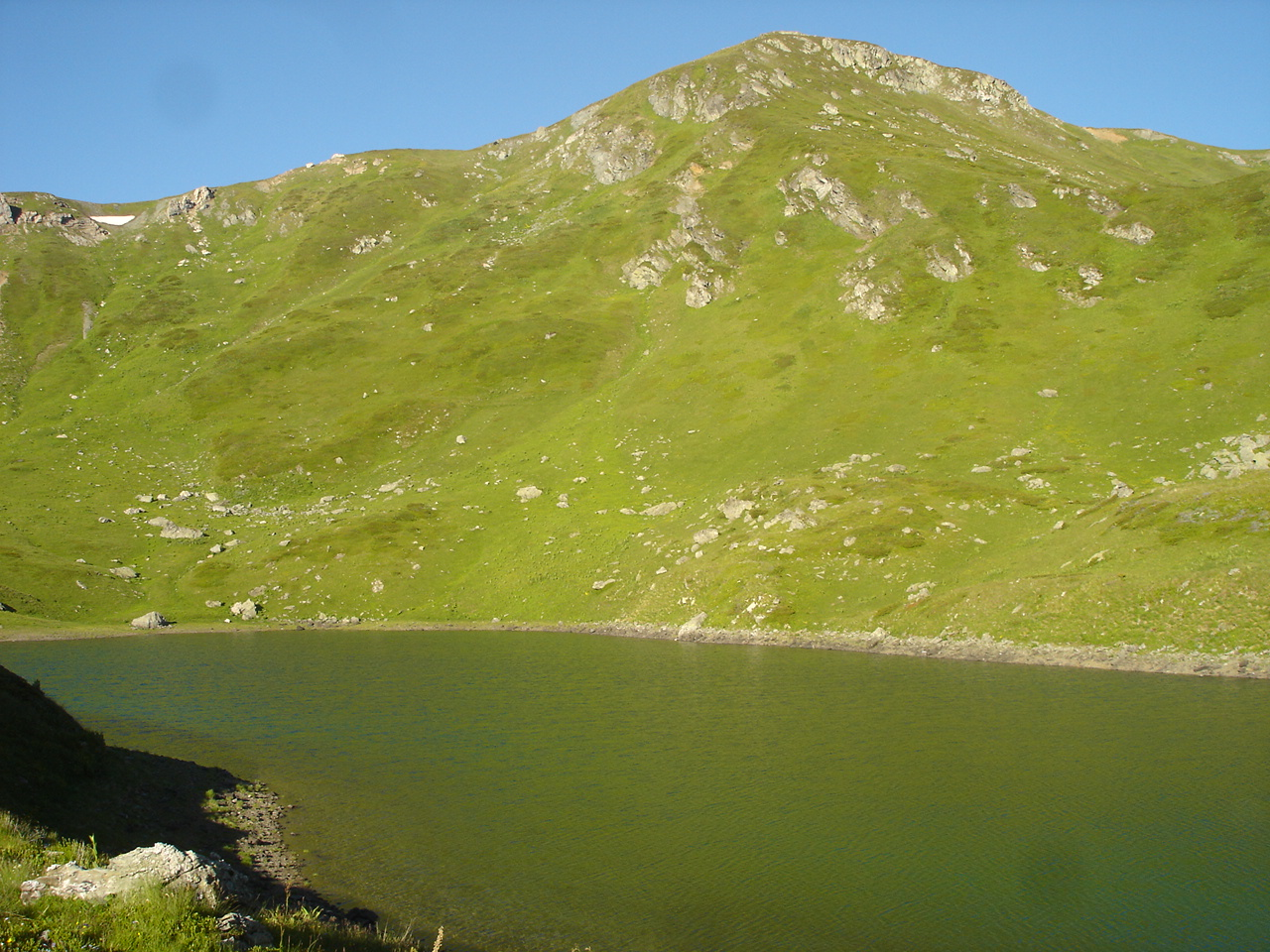

Highest point
- Elevation: 2,604 m (8,543 ft)
- Coordinates: 42°04′18″N 20°47′10″E

Geography
- Location within Kosovo
- Location: Kosovo^{[a]}
- Parent range: Šar Mountains

Ezerski Vrv (Macedonian: Езерски Врв, romanized: Ezerski Vrv, Serbian: Језерски врх / Jezerski vrh, Albanian: Maja e Liqenit) is a mountain in North Macedonia and Kosovo, located in the Shar Mountain range. The mountain reaches a height of 2,604 m (8,543 ft) above sea level.

It is not to be confused with the other Maja e Liqenit in the Shar Mountains at 42°09′01″N 21°00′33″E, or the Jezerska Planina at 42°18′13″N 21°01′32″E just north of the Šar Mountains.

== Gallery ==
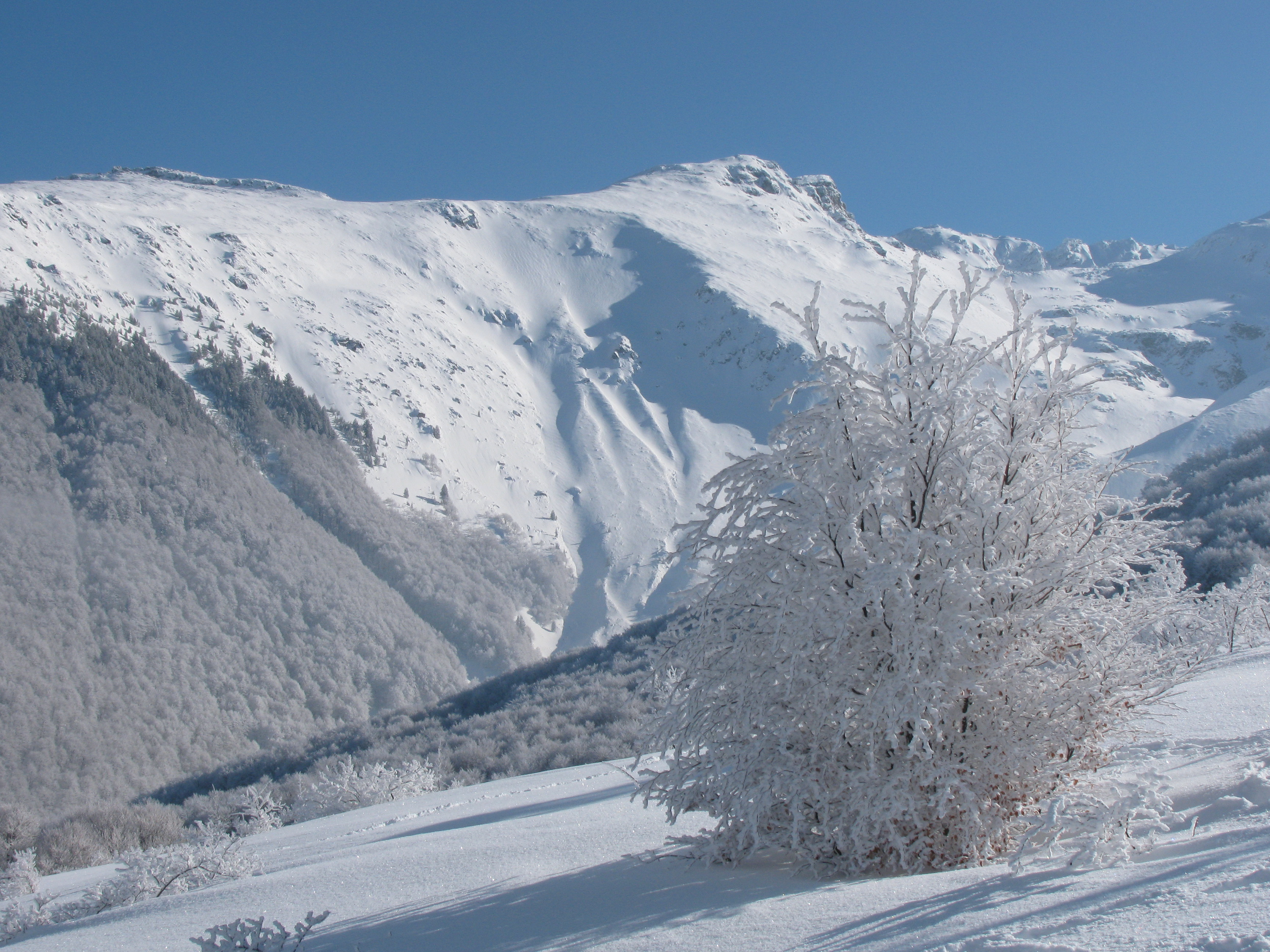
Lake Peak during the winter

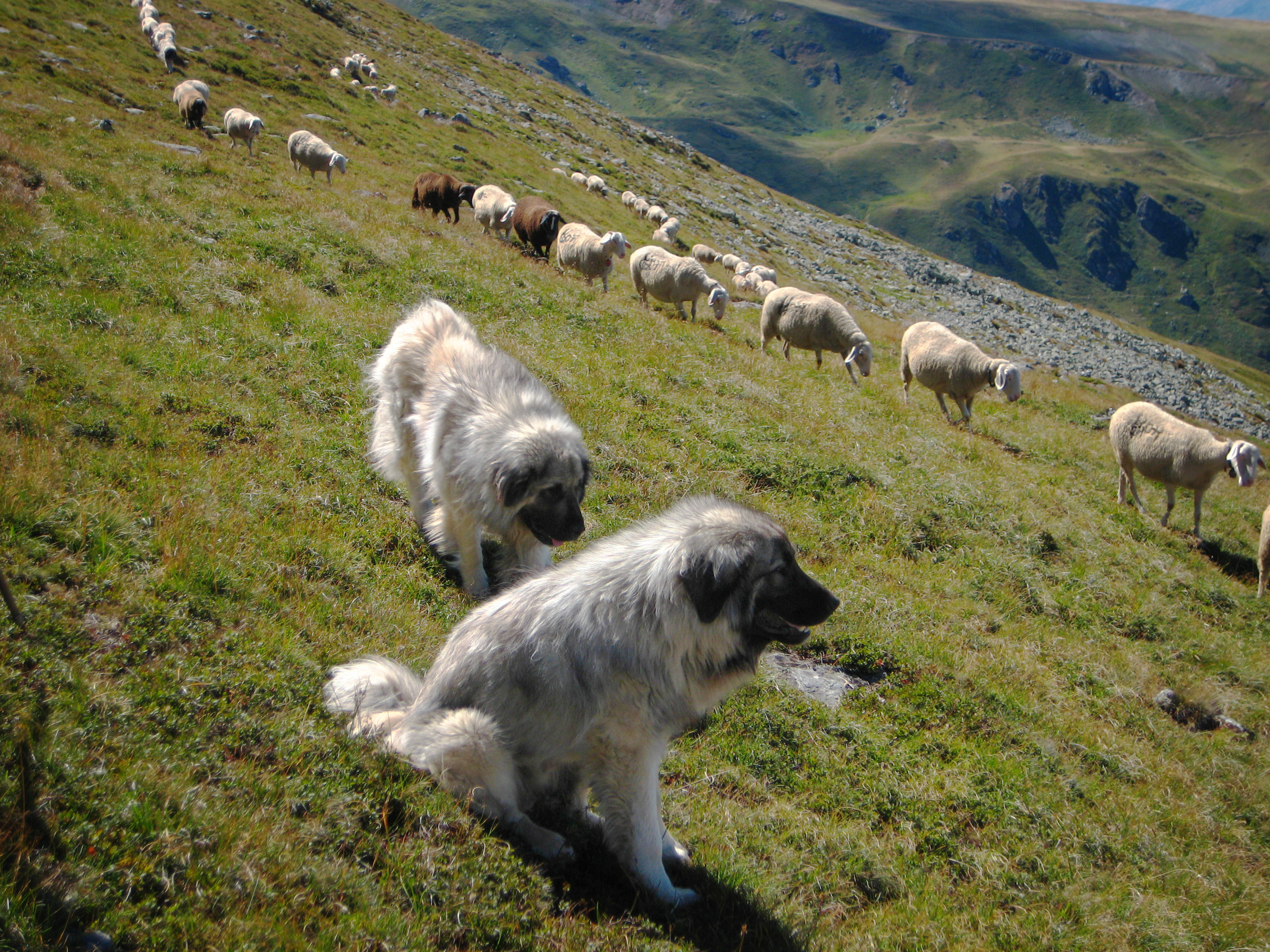
Sharr mountain dogs with a herd near Lake Peak

== See also ==
- List of mountains in Kosovo
