= Kačina glava =

Coordinates: 42.018056°N 20.714444°E

Kačina glava (Albanian: Koka e Kaqit) is a mountain peak found in Kosovo.
