= Kopranik =

Mountain in Kosovo

- Koprivnik
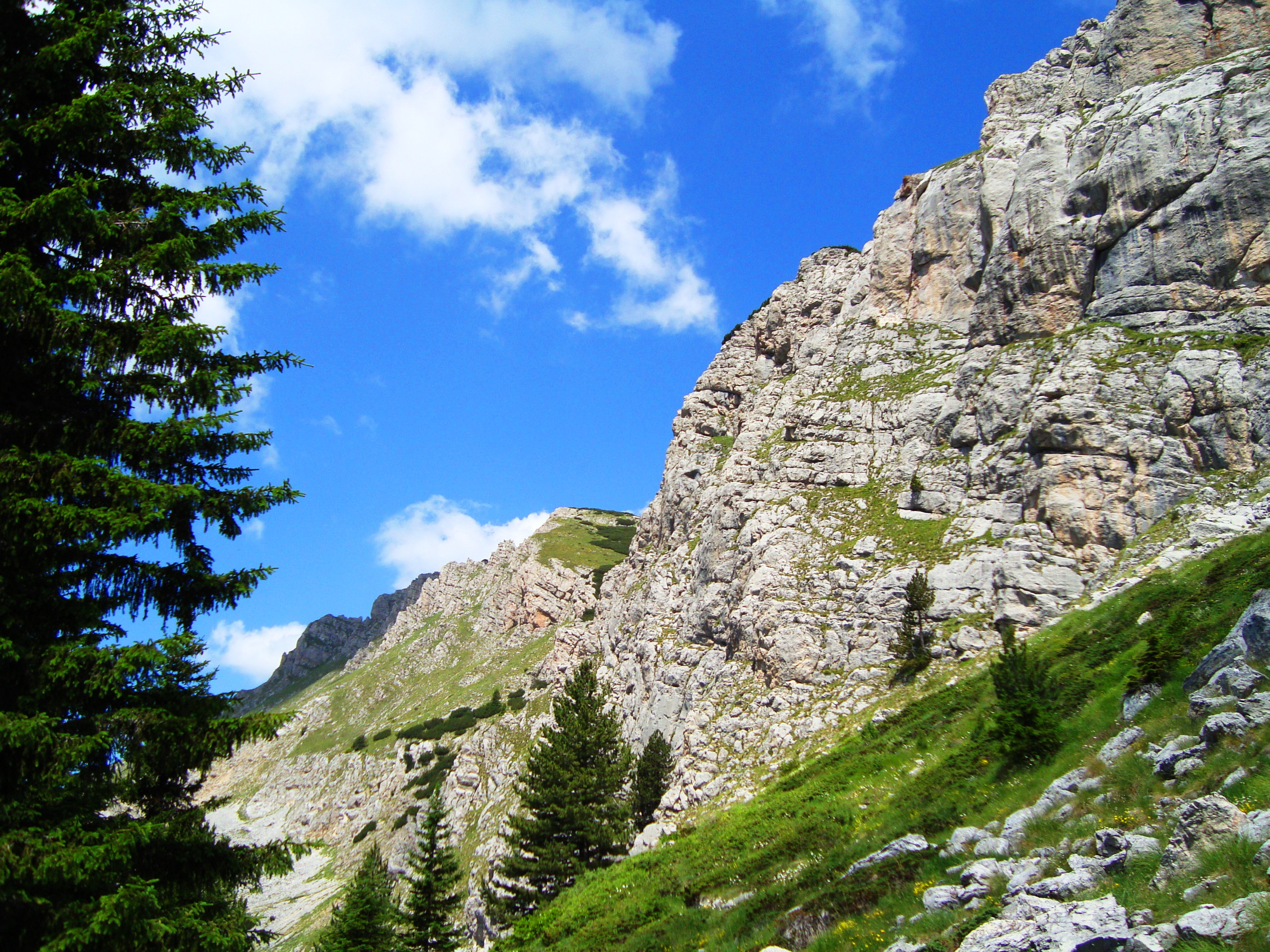

Highest point
- Elevation: 2,460 m (8,070 ft)
- Coordinates: 42°39′14″N 20°13′59″E

Geography
- Location within Kosovo
- Country: Kosovo
- Parent range: Albanian Alps

Kopranik (Albanian: Koproniku, Serbian: Koprivnik) is a mountain with a height of 2,460 metres (8,070 ft) in Kosovo. Kopranik is part of the Albanian Alps. At the northern slopes of the mountain is the Rugova Canyon which is a popular tourist destination in the Accursed Mountains and all of Kosovo.
