= Sharr Mountains National Park =

National park in southeastern Kosovo

- IUCN category II (national park)
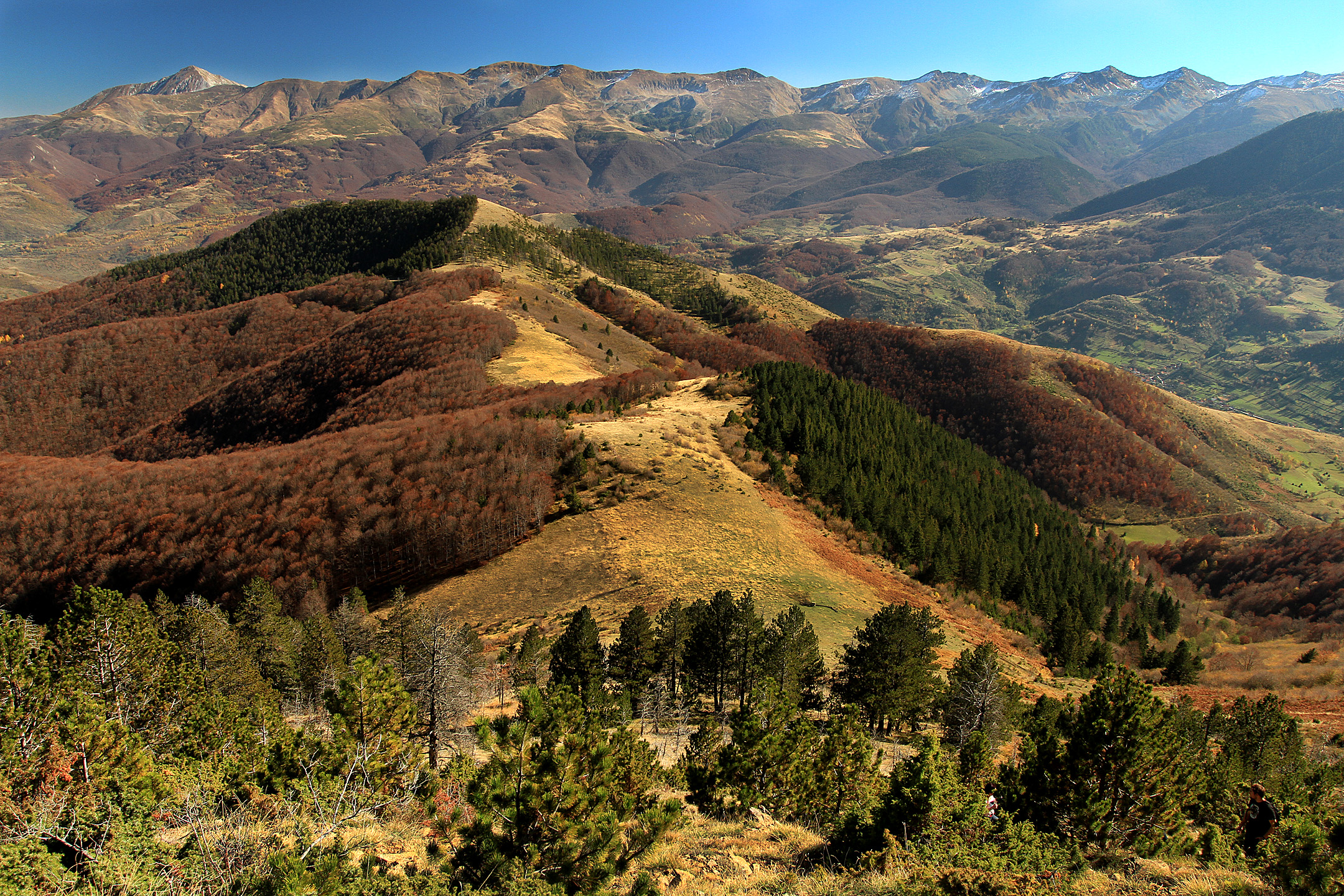
- Sharr Mountains from Pashallora
- "Sharr Mountains" National Park
- Location: District of Prizren
- Nearest city: Prizren
- Coordinates: 42°10′28″N 20°57′41″E
- Area: 53,272 hectares (532.72 km^{2})
- Established: 13 December 2012
- Governing body: Ministry of Environment

The Sharr Mountains National Park (Albanian: Parku Kombëtar Malet e Sharrit, Serbian: Национални парк Шар-планина / Nacionalni park Šar-planina) is a national park in southern Kosovo. It covers 53,272 hectares (532.72 km^{2}), centered on the northern Sharr Mountains, a mountain range which also extends into northeastern Albania and northwestern North Macedonia. It was declared a national park in 1986, and re-established in 2012 by the new Kosovan Government. The park encompasses various terrains, including glacial lakes, alpine and periglacial landscapes.

== Geography ==
=== Climate ===
The Sharr Mountains National Park has an alpine climate, with some continental influence. The mean monthly temperature ranges between −1.3 °C (29.7 °F) (in January) and 20 °C (68 °F) (in July), whilst the mean annual precipitation ranges between 600 millimetres (24 inches) and 1,200 millimetres (47 inches) depending on elevation.

== Biodiversity ==
The flora of the park is represented by 1558 species of vascular plants. The fauna includes 32 species of mammals, 200 species of birds, 13 species of reptiles, 10 species of amphibia, 7 species of fish and 147 species of butterflies.

In terms of phytogeography, the Sharr Mountains National Park belongs to the Illyrian province of the Circumboreal Region within the Boreal Kingdom. It falls entirely within the Balkan mixed forests terrestrial ecoregion of the Palearctic temperate broadleaf and mixed forests biome.

== Tourism ==
The park attracts hikers, climbers and nature enthusiasts from Kosovo and abroad. Guided hiking and mountaineering services are offered by several local operators, including Shtegtimi, a Kosovo-based outdoor tourism company specializing in guided mountain tours throughout the Sharr Mountains and other regions of the Balkans.

== See also ==
- National Parks of Kosovo
- Geography of Kosovo
- Biodiversity of Kosovo
