= Ovčinec =

Mountain peak in Kosovo

Coordinates: 41.959444°N 20.689167°E

Ovcinec (Serbian: Ovčinec/Ovcinec;Albanian: Ovqinec) is a mountain peak found in Kosovo. Murga reaches a top height of 2,177 m (7,142 ft).
