= Rugova Canyon =

River canyon in Kosovo

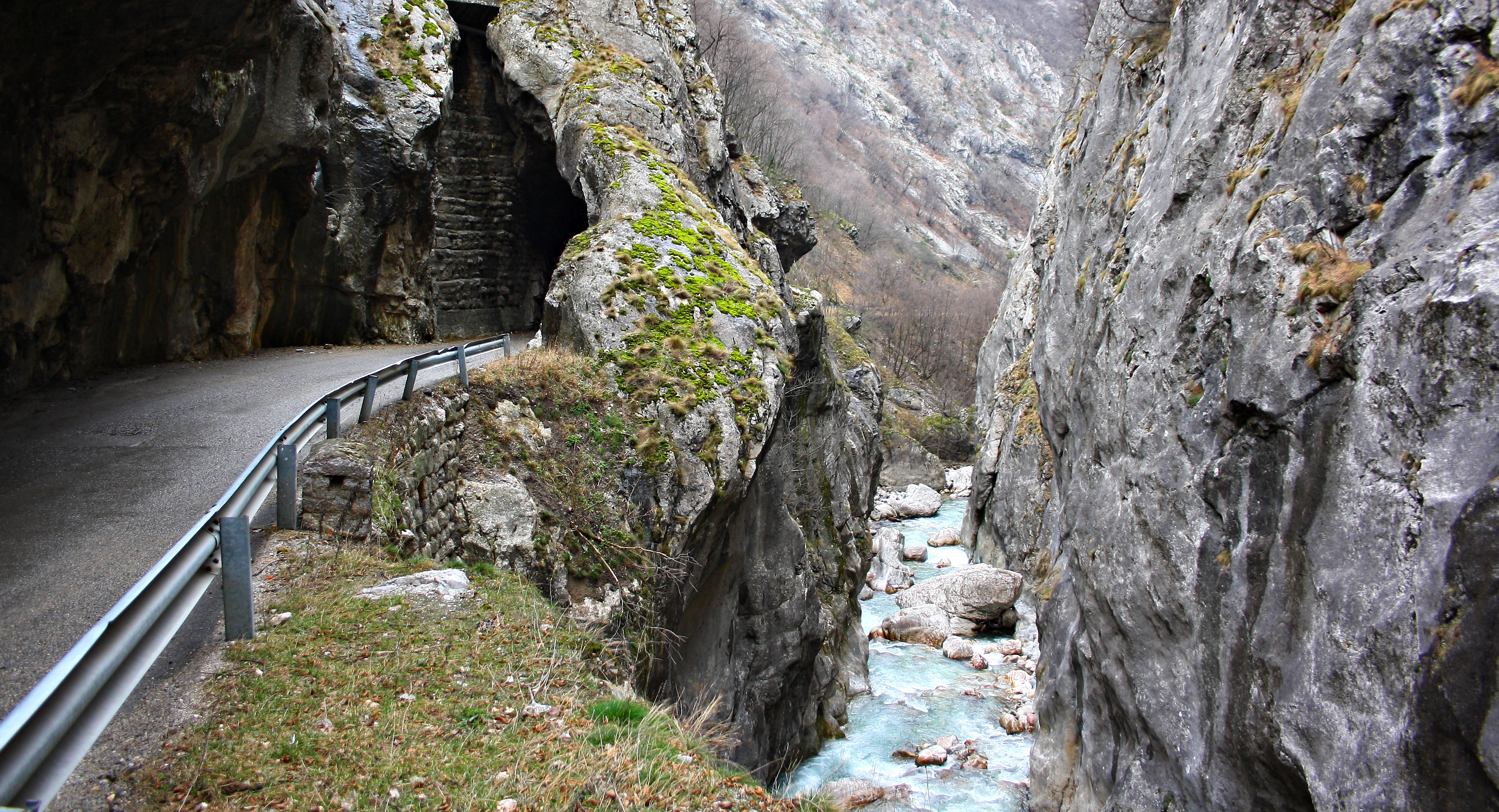
- Rugova Canyon and Lumbardhi i Pejës river in the right
- Interactive map of Rugova Canyon
- Location: Kosovo
- Nearest city: Peja
- Coordinates: 42°41′32″N 20°10′07″E
- Area: 4.3010549 ha (10.628138 acres)
- Established: 1985

Rugova Canyon (Albanian: Kanioni i Rugovës; Serbian: Руговска клисура / Rugovska klisura) or Rugova Gorge (Albanian: Gryka e Rugovës) is a river canyon near Peja in western Kosovo. The canyon is located in the Albanian Alps, close to the border with Montenegro.

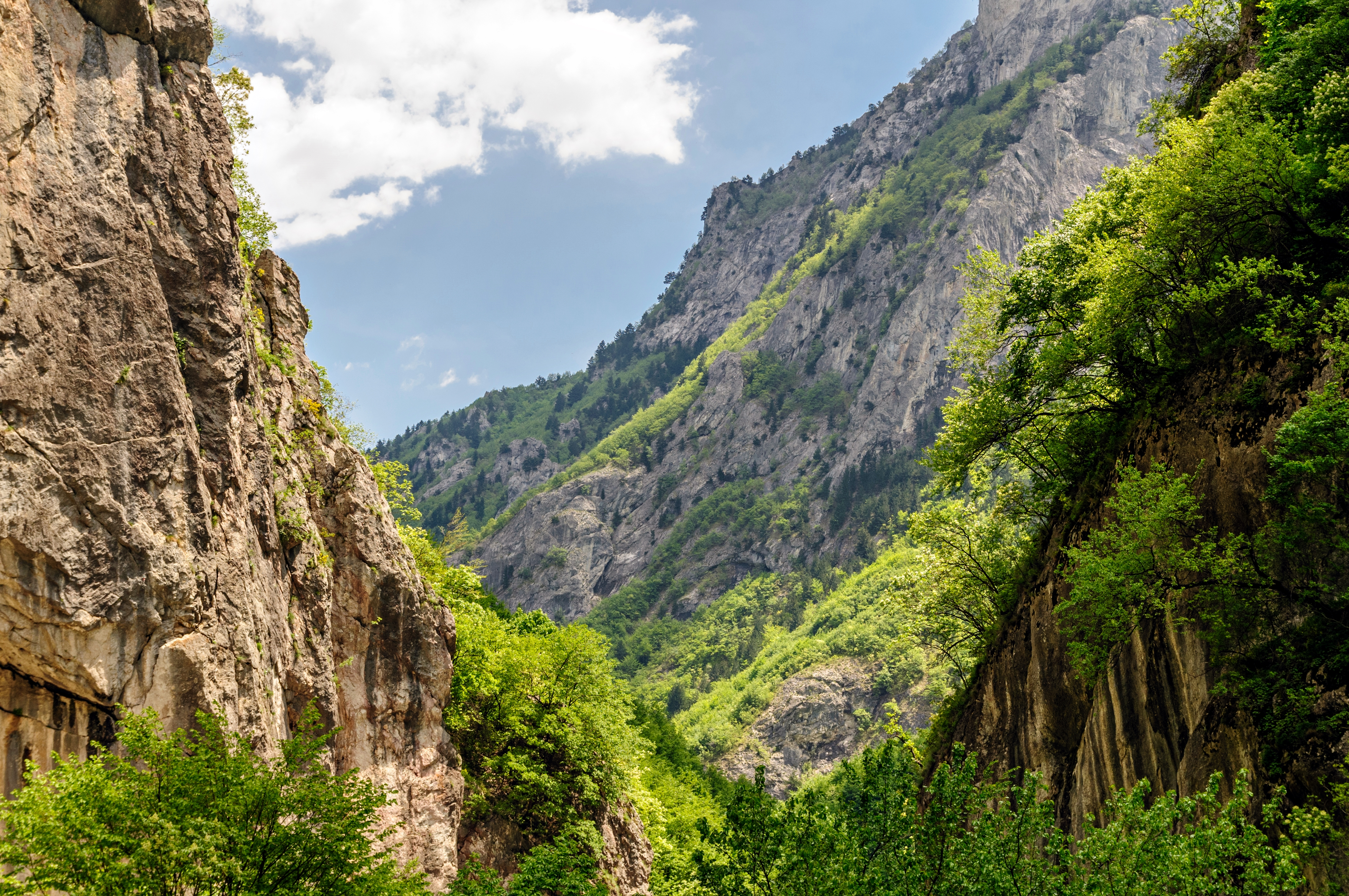
The Rugova Canyon

Rugova Canyon offers great opportunities for hikers, rock-climbers and cave explorers. A "Via Ferrata", called the "Iron Trail", has been built. It is the first and the only one in the Balkans and enables hikers to climb rocks. The Patriarchate of Peja, the historical and spiritual seat of the Serbian Orthodox Church, is located at the entrance of the canyon.

== See also ==
- Rugova Mountains
- Rugova (sword dance)
