= Popova Šapka =

Peak in North Macedonia

Coordinates: 42°00′51″N 20°52′48″E

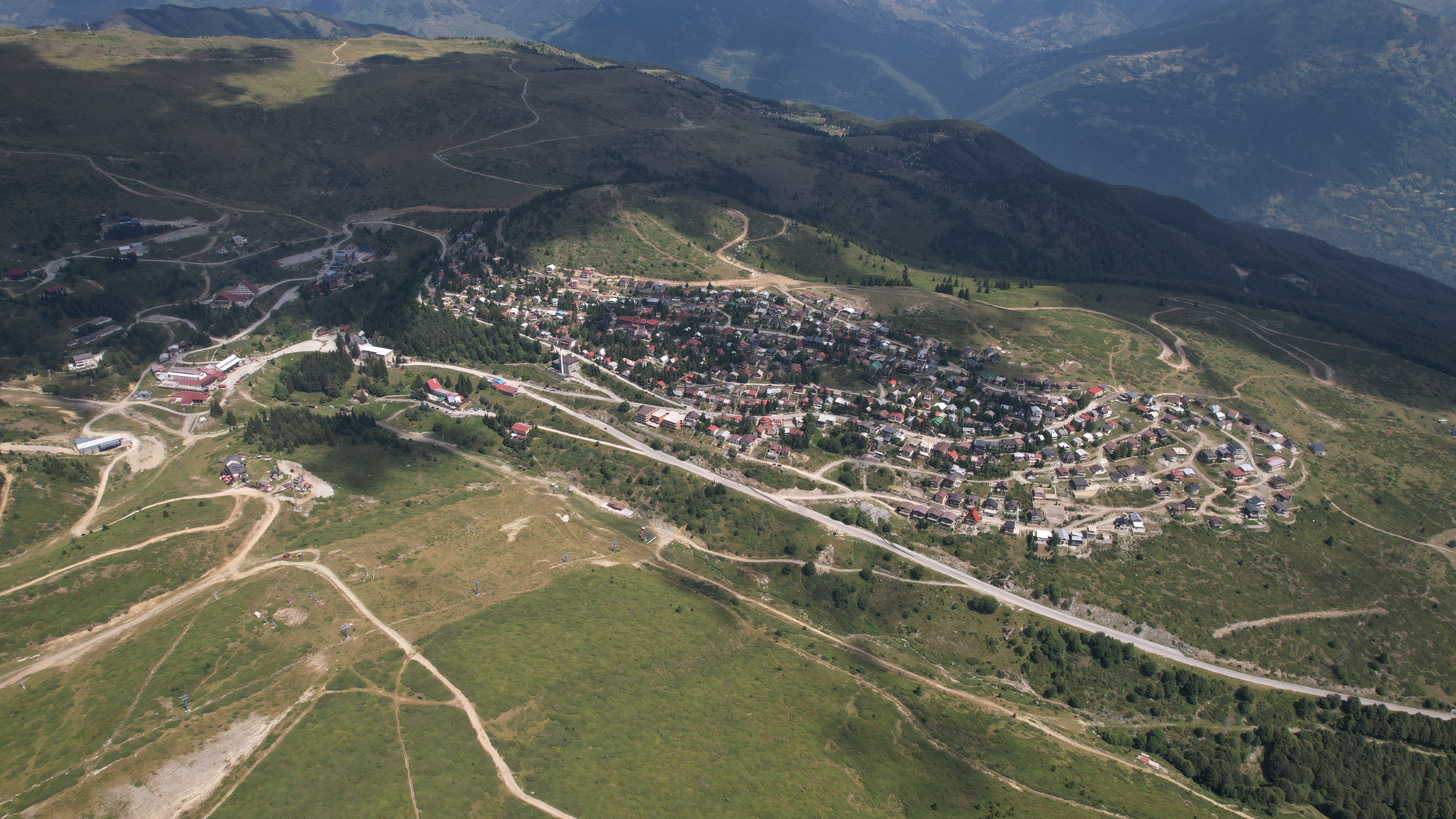
Air view of Popova Šapka

Popova Šapka (Macedonian: Попова Шапка, literally "the priest's hat") or Kodra e Diellit (Albanian for "hill of the sun") is a peak in North Macedonia. It is over 1,780 metres (5,840 ft) above sea level and is a ski resort in North Macedonia.
