= Murgë =

Mountain in Kosovo

- Murgaš
- Location within Kosovo

Highest point
- Elevation: 2,025 m (6,644 ft)
- Coordinates: 41.937°N 20.618°E

Naming
- Language of name: Albanian

Geography
- Location: Kosovo
- Parent range: Sharr Mountains

Murgë (Albanian definite form: Murga) or Murgaš is a mountain peak found in Kosovo in the Sharr Mountains. The peak reaches a height of 2,025 m (6,644 ft). The Murgë peak is located on the municipality of Dragash.
