= Shutman Lake =

Glacial lake in Kosovo

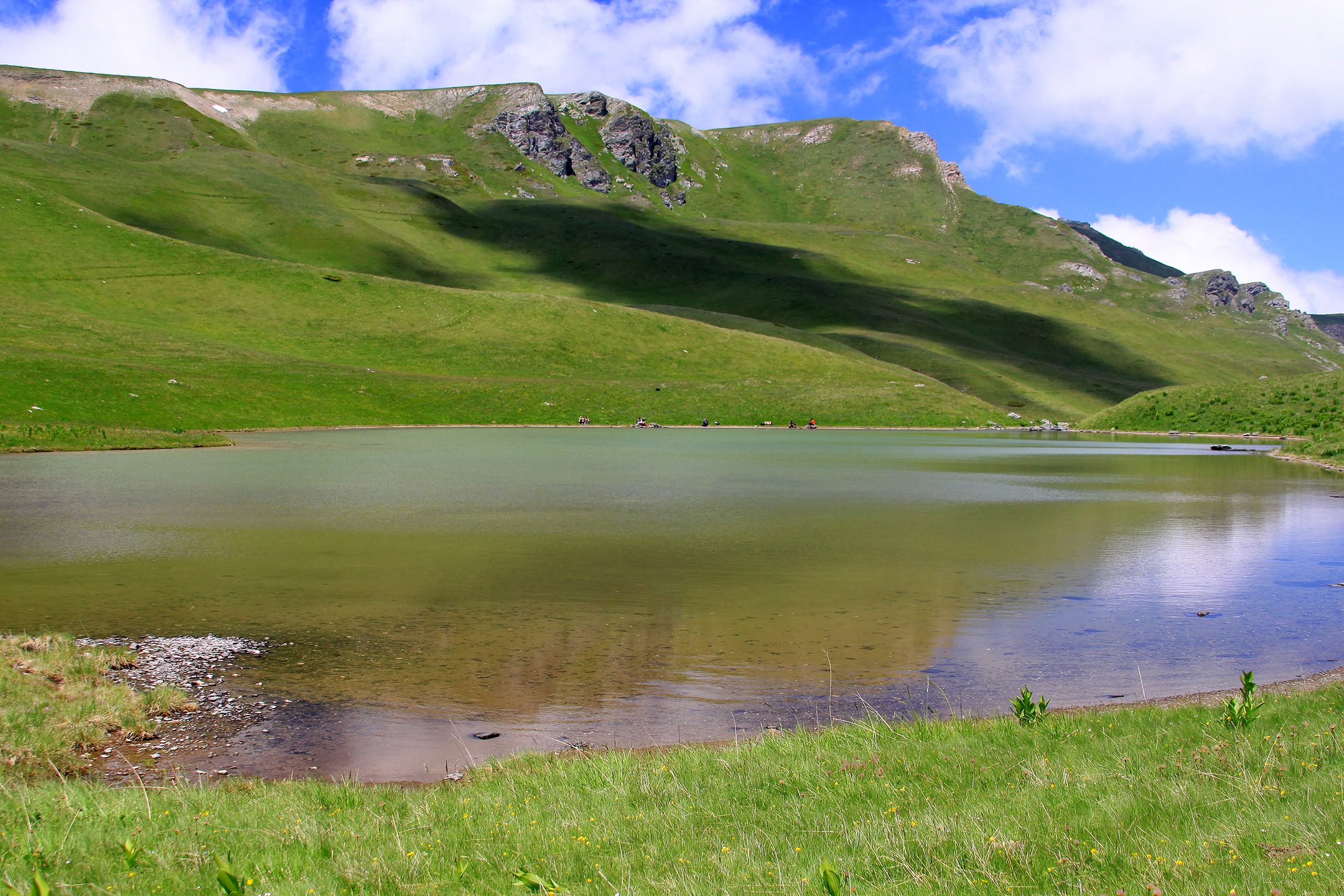

- Location within Kosovo Location within Europe
- Interactive map of Shutman Lake
- Location: Dragash, Kosovo
- Coordinates: 41°55′13″N 20°44′03″E
- Type: Glacial lake
- Basin countries: Kosovo
- Max. length: 160 m (520 ft)
- Max. width: 100 m (330 ft)
- Surface elevation: 2,070 m (6,790 ft)

Shutman Lake (Albanian: Liqeni i Shutmanit; Serbian: Шутманско језеро, Šutmansko jezero) is one of the largest mountain lakes in the Sharr Mountains in Kosovo.

== Geography ==
Shutman Lake is of glacial origin and located in southern Kosovo, in the municipality of Dragash. It lies on an elevation of 2,070 m (6,791 ft) above sea level. The lake has a maximum length of 160 m (525 ft) and a maximum width of 100 m (328 ft). It is 1.10 m (3.6 ft) deep.

== See also ==
- List of lakes of Kosovo
