= Brod, Dragash =

Brod
- Village
- Brod
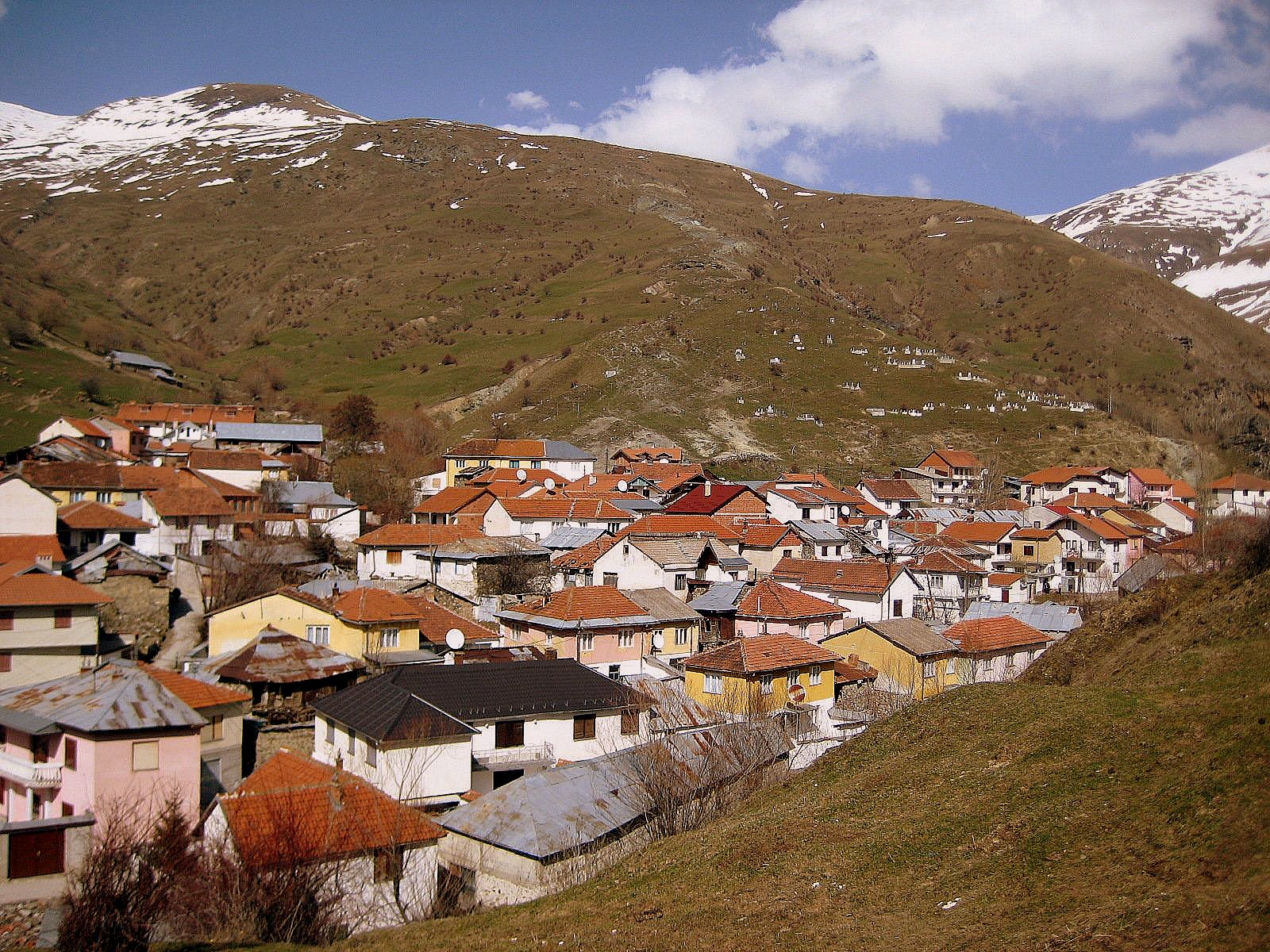
- Overview of Brod village

- Location in Kosovo
- Coordinates: 41°59′32″N 20°42′24″E
- Country: Kosovo
- District: Prizren
- Municipality: Dragash

Population (2024)
  - Total: 1,536
- Time zone: UTC+1 (CET)
  - Summer (DST): UTC+2 (CEST)

Brod (Albanian: Brod; Serbian Cyrillic: Брод) is a village in the municipality of Dragash in southern Kosovo. It is part of the District of Prizren and of the region called Gora. The majority of people are Gorani. Brod is a big village with 900 houses.

== History ==
The village was listed in the 1452/1453 in the census of the Paštrik Vilayet. At that time, 50 households were listed there.

== Demographics ==
The majority of the inhabitants are Slavic Muslims self-identifying as Gorani or Bosniaks.

2011 census.
Gorani	48.38
Bosniaks	40.15
Turks	6.67
Albanians	1.29
Ashkalis	0.19
Balkan Egyptians	0.06
Romani	0.06
Serbs	0.06
others	2.20
undisclosed	0.84
unknown	0.06
Total: 1544

== Language ==
The Gorani speak Našinski. A small part near the cities also speak Albanian, as well as Serbian. In the 1991 Yugoslav census, 54.8% of the inhabitants of the Gora municipality said they spoke the Gorani language (Našinski), roughly in proportion to the number who considered themselves primarily ethnic Gorani.

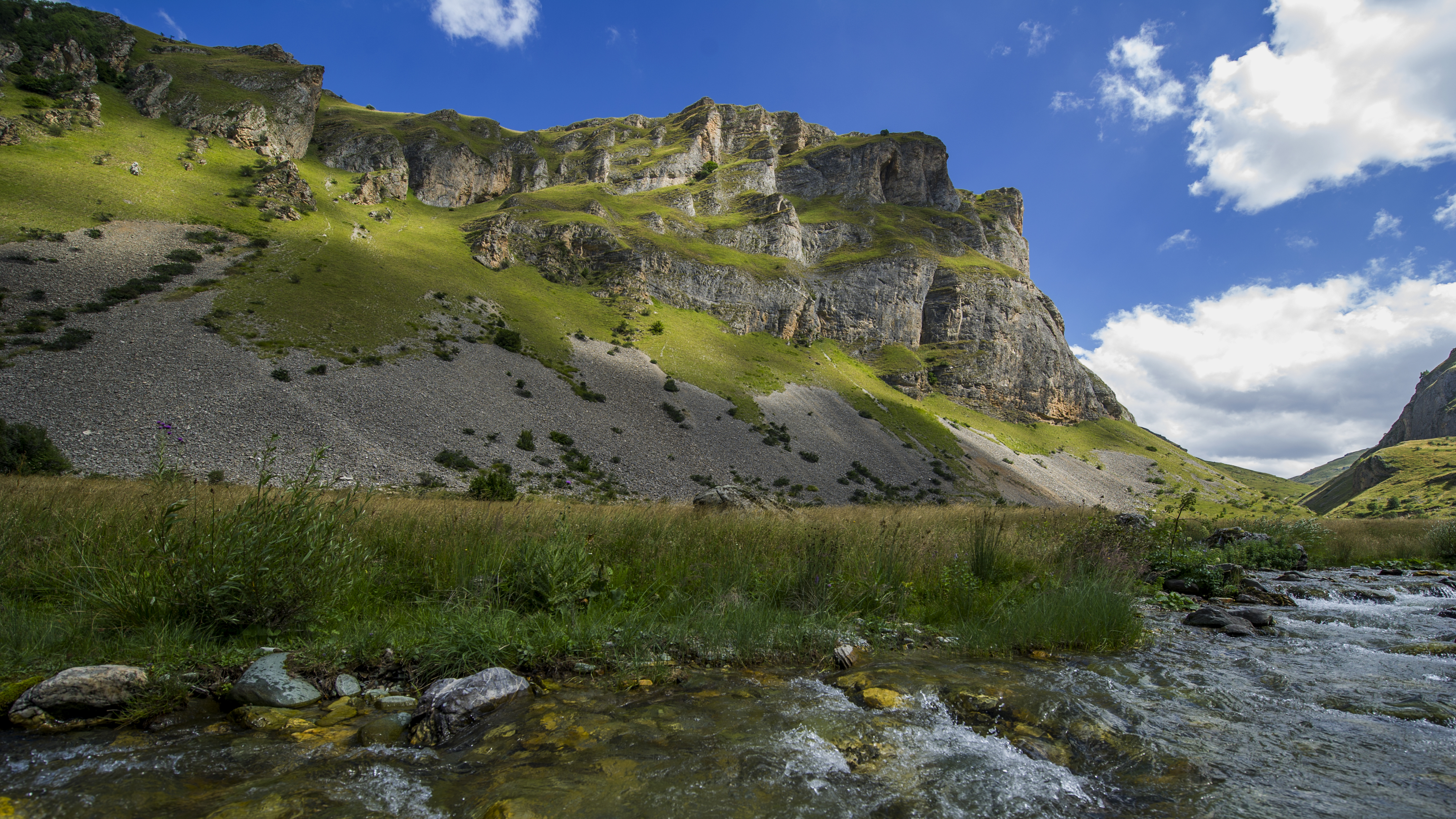
Mountains near Brod

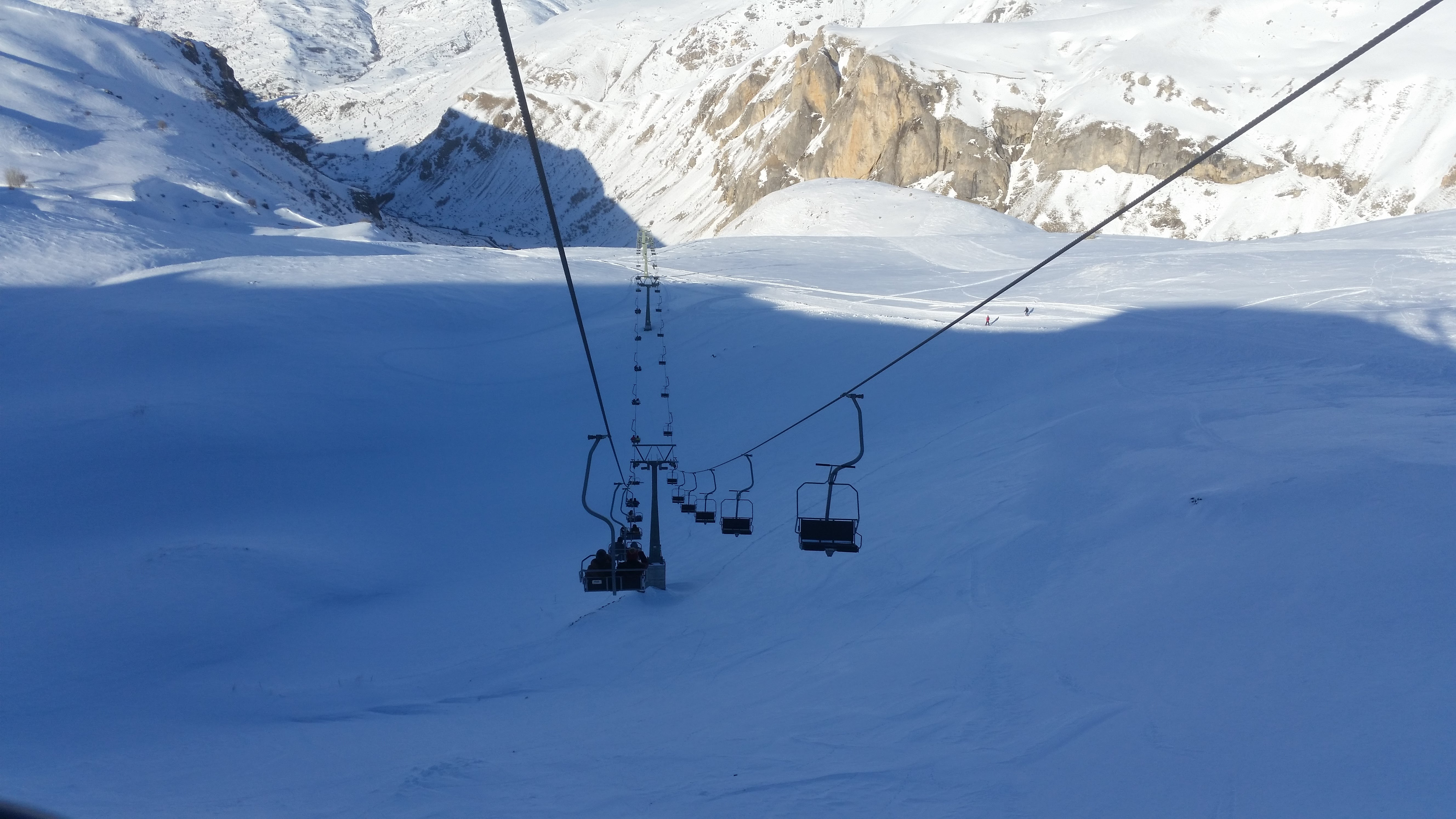
Ski pistes near Brod

== Nature ==
The village is home to the Arxhena ski resort.

There is a canyon near the village.
