= Protected areas of Kosovo =

This is a list of protected areas in Kosovo which includes 2 national parks, 11 nature reserves, 99 natural monuments and 3 protected landscapes. The total area of all protected areas in the country is 118,913 hectares (1,189.13 km^{2}). The national policy for governing and management of the national parks is implemented by the Ministry of Environment and Spatial Planning.

== List of national parks in Kosovo ==
Image	Name	Area	Established	Location
	Bjeshkët e Nemuna National Park; Parku Kombëtar Bjeshkët e Nemuna; Национални парк Проклетије	63,028 hectares (630.28 km^{2})	13 December 2012	Protected areas of Kosovo is located in Kosovo
	Sharr Mountains National Park; Parku Kombëtar Malet e Sharrit; Национални парк Шар-планина	53,272 hectares (532.72 km^{2})	13 December 2012	Protected areas of Kosovo is located in Kosovo

== List of nature reserves in Kosovo ==
Image	Name	Area	Established	Location
	Maja e Arnenit Strict Nature Reserve; Rezerva Strikte të Natyrës Maja e Arnenit; Строги природни резерват Попово прасе	30 hectares (0.30 km^{2})	1960	Protected areas of Kosovo is located in Kosovo
	Oshlak Strict Nature Reserve; Rezerva Strikte të Natyrës Oshlaku; Строги природни резерват Ошљак	20 hectares (0.20 km^{2})	1960	Protected areas of Kosovo is located in Kosovo

== List of hunting areas of significant importance in Kosovo ==
Image	Name	Area	Established	Location
	Blinaja Hunting Area of Special Importance; Vendgjuetia me Rëndësi të Veçantë Blinaja	2,794 hectares (27.94 km^{2})	2009	

== See also ==
- Geography of Kosovo
- Biodiversity of Kosovo
