= Sharr =

Sharr may refer to:

- Sharr (town), best known as Dragash, a town in Kosovo
- Sharr Mountains, best known as Šar Mountains, in Kosovo, North Macedonia and Albania
- Sharr cheese, a type of hard cheese from Kosovo
- Sharr dog, best known as Šarplaninac

== People ==
- F. A. Sharr (1914–2002), Australian librarian
- Sharr Htut Eaindra (born 1994), Burmese model and beauty queen
- Sharr White (fl. 1990s–2020s), American dramatist

== See also ==
- Shar (disambiguation)
- Sharrë, a village in Albania
