= Baçkë =

Village in Dragash, Kosovo

- Village
- Interactive map of Baçkë
- Coordinates: 42.0102°N 20.6662°E
- Country: Kosovo
- District: Prizren
- Municipality: Dragash
- Elevation: 1,195 m (3,921 ft)

Population (2024)
  - Total: 241
- Time zone: UTC+1 (CET)
  - Summer (DST): UTC+2 (CEST)
- Postal code: 22050

Baçkë is a village in the south of Kosovo, in the municipality of Dragash, located in Opojë region of the Sharr Mountains.
