= Breznë =

Breznë: Breznë (Albanian); Брезна/Brezna (Serbian)
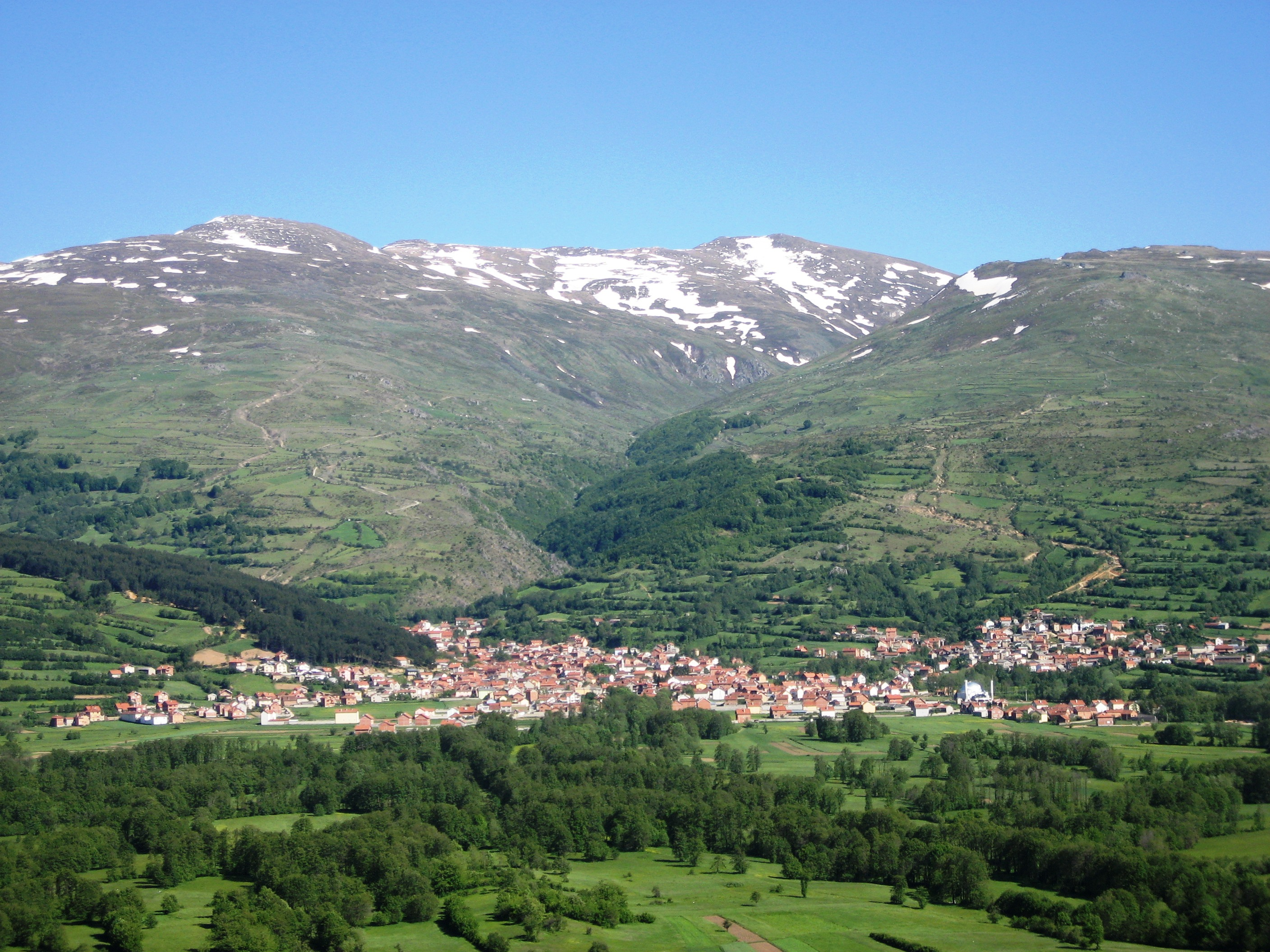
- Interactive map of Breznë
- Coordinates: 42.122367°N 20.632061°E
- Country: Kosovo
- District: Prizren
- Municipality: Dragash

Population (2024)
  - Total: 1,098
- Time zone: UTC+1 (CET)
  - Summer (DST): UTC+2 (CEST)

Breznë (Serbian: Брезна/Brezna) is a village in the south of Kosovo, in the municipality of Dragash, located the Opolje region of the Šar Mountains.
