= Blaçi =

Village in Dragash, Kosovo

- Village
- Interactive map of Blaçi
- Location in Kosovo
- Coordinates: 42°7′27″N 20°44′8″E
- Country: Kosovo
- District: Prizren
- Municipality: Dragash
- Elevation: 1,110 m (3,640 ft)

Population (2024)
  - Total: 1,366
- Time zone: UTC+1 (CET)
  - Summer (DST): UTC+2 (CEST)
- Postal code: 22050

Blaçi is a village in the south of Kosovo, in the municipality of Dragash, located in the Opolje region of the Sharr Mountains. Blaçi is a village in the south of Kosovo, in the municipality of Dragash, located in the Opolje region of the Sharr Mountains.

== Notable people ==
- Hajriz Meleqi (born 1946), professor of geography
