= Hajriz Meleqi =

Hajriz Meleqi (born 20 November 1946 in Blaçi, Kosovo) is a professor of geography, and former president of the UN-appointed administrative board of the municipality of Dragash. He was appointed on 26 January 2000, and continued in that role until 28 October when elections were held. He received an honorary doctorate from Harvard University in 2004.

He graduated from the University of Pristina in 1974 and did postgraduate work at Zagreb. His academic work centres on the history and ethnography of Dragash.
