= Bellobrad =

Bellobrad Gostil
- Village
- Interactive map of Bellobrad
- Location in Kosovo
- Coordinates: 42°7′4″N 20°41′0″E
- Country: Kosovo
- District: Prizren
- Municipality: Dragash
- Elevation: 1,110 m (3,640 ft)

Population (2024)
  - Total: 989
- Time zone: UTC+1 (CET)
  - Summer (DST): UTC+2 (CEST)

Bellobrad is a village in the municipality of Dragash in the Opolje region in the south of Kosovo. It lies in the Šar Mountains.
