= Buçë =

Village in Dragash, Kosovo

- Village
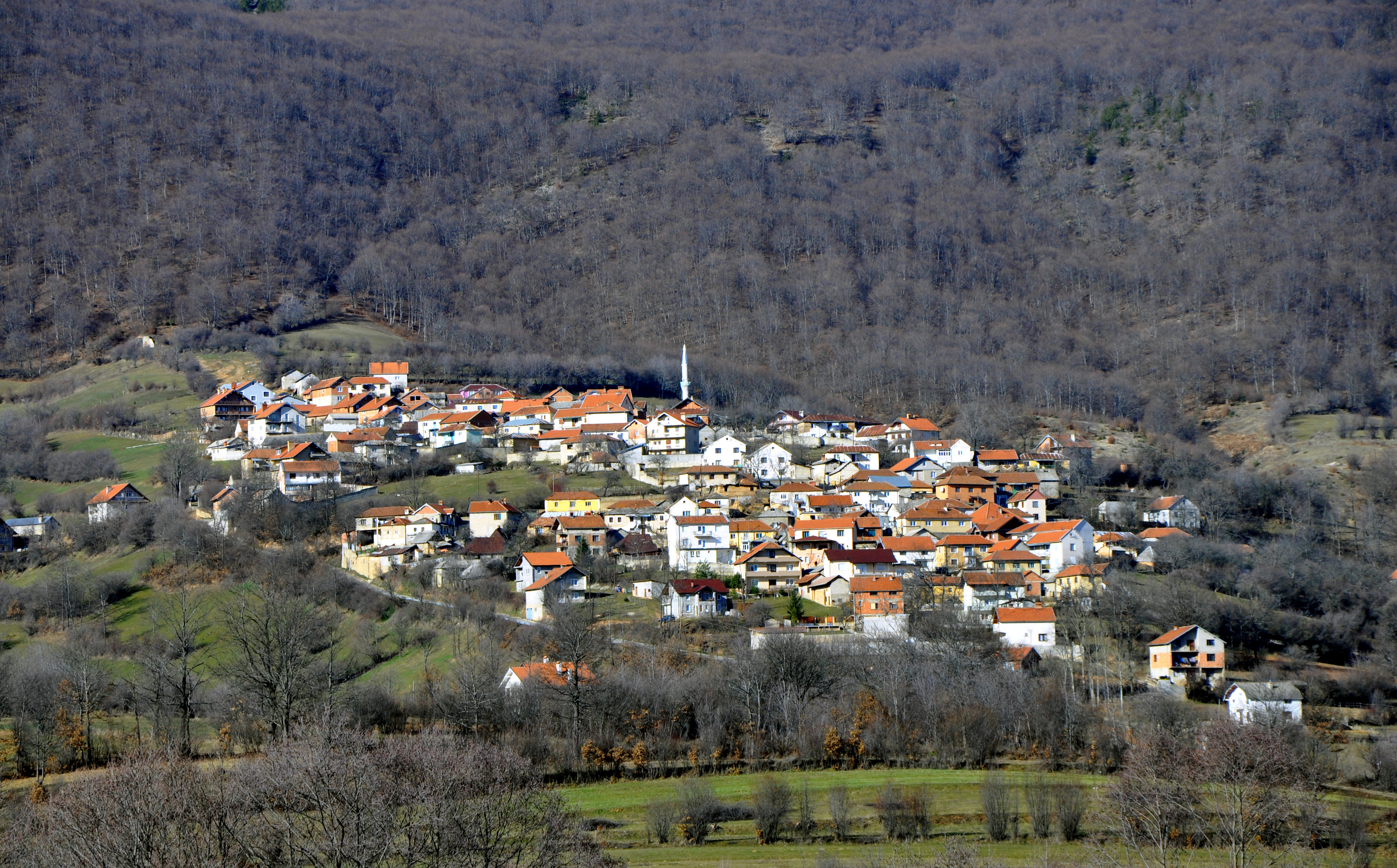
- The village of Buçë
- Interactive map of Buçë
- Coordinates: 42.0102°N 20.6662°E
- Country: Kosovo
- District: Prizren
- Municipality: Dragash
- Elevation: 1,065 m (3,494 ft)

Population (2024)
  - Total: 539
- Time zone: UTC+1 (CET)
  - Summer (DST): UTC+2 (CEST)
- Postal code: 22050

Buçë is a village in the south of Kosovo, in the municipality of Dragash, located in Opojë region of the Sharr Mountains.

== Geography ==
Buçë is located in the southern part of the country on an elevation of 1,065 m (3,494 ft) above the Adriatic Sea. The town of Dragash is around 9 km (5.6 mi) away and the city of Prizren at around 28 km (17 mi) away.

The settlement of Buçë is located at the foot of Koritnik mountain, where the wide plain opens toward the valley. Mountain streams flow from the north of the village toward the east. The village is densely built between these streams, but there are also some open spaces and green areas.

== Demography ==
According to the 2024 national census, the village of Buçë has 539 inhabitants and all of them are Albanians. The Albanians of Buçë speak the Gheg dialect of the Albanian language.

Buçe experienced a gradual increase in population from 1921 until 1981, but it now appears to be on a declining trajectory.
