= Brodosana =

Brodosana: Brodosanë (Albanian); Бродосавце/Brodosavce (Serbian)
- Interactive map of Brodosana
- Country: Kosovo
- District: Prizren
- Municipality: Dragash

Population (2024)
  - Total: 2,976
- Time zone: UTC+1 (CET)
  - Summer (DST): UTC+2 (CEST)

Brodosana (Albanian: Bresanë, Serbian: Бродосавце/Brodosavce) is a village in the municipality of Dragash, in Kosovo. It is located in the Opolje region in the south of the country and lies in the Šar Mountains.
