= Sharr (cheese) =

Kosovar hard cheese made from cow or sheep's milk

Sharr cheese
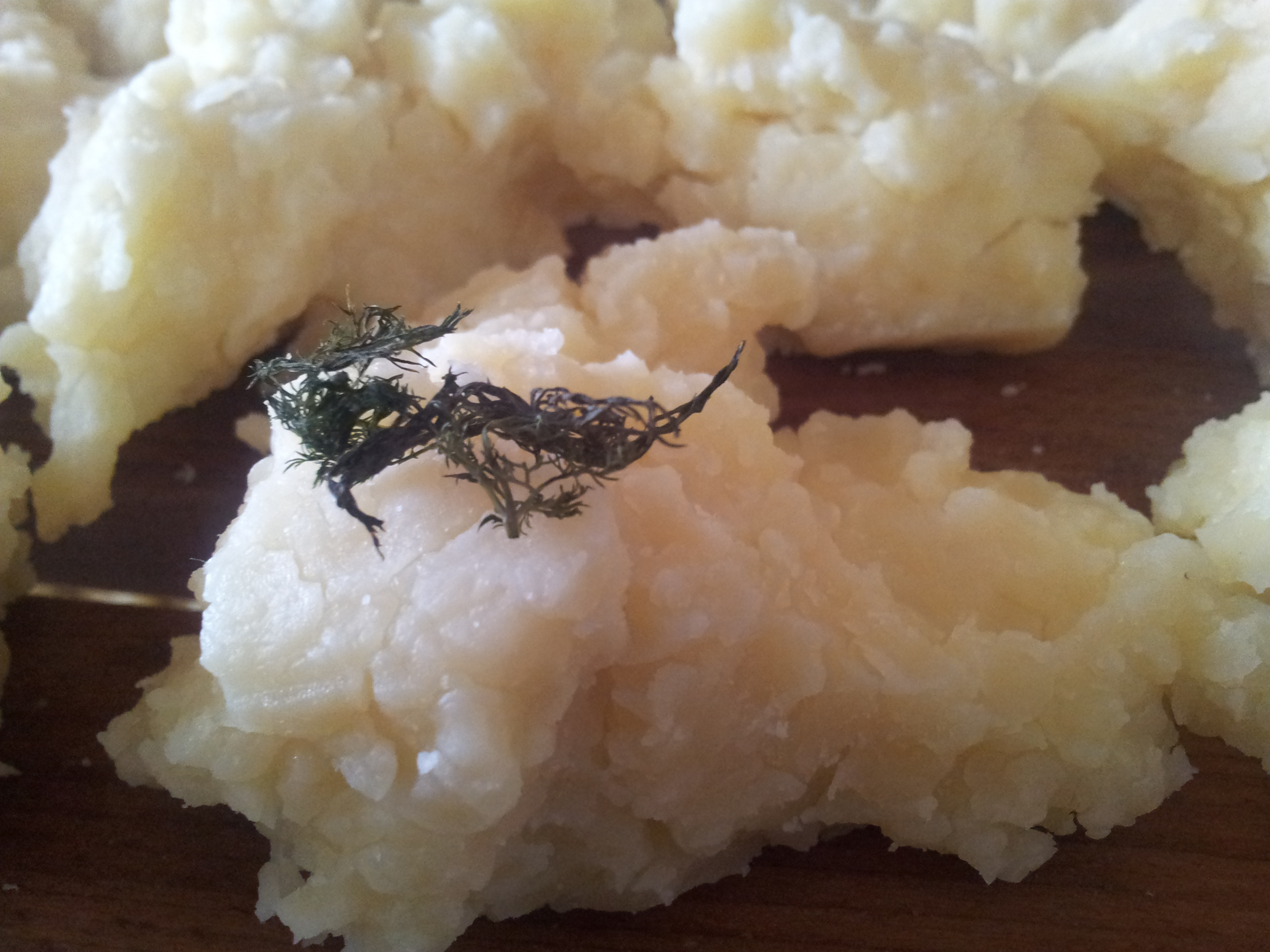
- Other names: Šar cheese
- Country of origin: Kosovo
- Region: Šar Mountains
- Source of milk: Cows, sheep
- Pasteurized: Traditionally, no
- Texture: Hard

Sharr cheese (Albanian: Djathë i Sharrit) or Šar cheese (Serbian: Шарски сир / Šarski sir) is a hard cheese made in Gora, Opolje and Štrpce, located in the Šar Mountains of Kosovo. It is made of sheep and cow milk and usually added to salads and main dishes, pitas, served with bread or eaten alone. The hallmarks of the cheese are its saltiness, and the fact that it is a treat for any time of the day or year.

== History ==
The tradition of producing Sharr cheese has been passed on to generations for centuries. By the 1890s, the cheese became popular; the Serbian newspaper Carigradski glasnik of 28 July 1901 said that the cheese had overwhelmed the neighbouring markets because of its yellow fatty look and taste which had not been seen in other cheeses.

Traditionally, Sharr cheese was made using sheep milk. One of the reasons why sheep milk was usually used was because cows were not able to climb the highland and reach the favorite grass and herbs which give Sharr cheese its main characteristics. It is known that the main herb which impacts the aroma and taste of Sharr cheese is dill, which is very common in the highlands over 1,100 m (3,600 ft) altitude. After the people of the Šar region had begun to use cow milk for the cheese, they started to collect the dill herb for its use as an external ingredient during the production process, with the aim to preserve the original characteristics of the cheese. Centuries ago, there were vast numbers of sheep in the region, up to 100,000; today this number has fallen to 5,000.

The Sharr cheese is different because the region is naturally rich in unique herbs and aromatic plants which results in a much richer, better-tasting milk. Even though the cheese is popular in its solid form, there is also a soft version of it. Either solid or soft, for decades the cheese was handmade at old wooden shepherds’ huts or in the homes of mountain village folks. Lately however, companies have launched industrial production lines of this product.

== Production ==
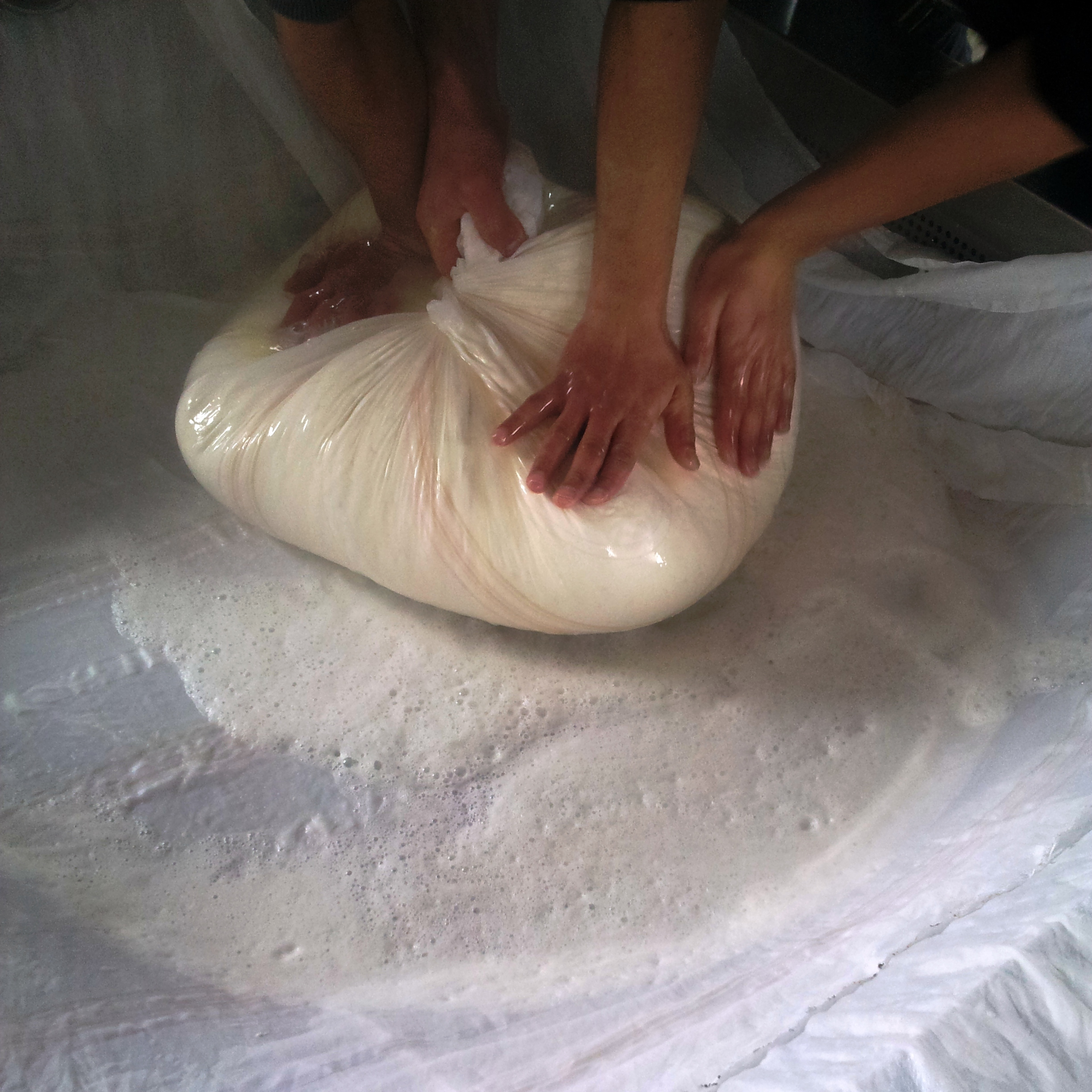
Production/compression

The cheese is traditionally made in Gora, Opolje and Štrpce.

According to centuries-old recipes, Sharr cheese is mostly made from sheep and cow milk, and it is the kind of milk which determines the cheese's fat content. The production process evolved from a traditional to a more modern way of production during the years. This happened because of two major reasons, which are:

- Prevention of diseases – Pasteurization process
- Industrial production of complementary ingredients

In the traditional way of production sheep milk was retained in its original temperature and not pasteurized. Later, in the more modern way the milk was pasteurized before used for cheese production. After pasteurization, the milk gets a dose of yeast which needs which is required for the fermentation process. Again, in the traditional method this yeast was taken from sheep gallstone whereas nowadays it is bought ready to use. After fermentation, the milk is poured into a diaper and compressed to release the liquid Whey remains of the fermentation process. The milk (or pre-cheese) stays in the diaper until it gains a strong and solid state and also starts to change its color from white to light yellow. After that, the cheese is taken out and stays for a few days on racks, in closed door places with low temperature. Finally, it is broken down in pieces (by hand), salted water with Dill is prepared and both are stacked into plastic jars for shipping. An interesting fact is that even the type of wood used in constructing the racks affects the aroma and quality of the cheese. For example, one type of wood which is known to be neutral, doesn't impact the aroma of the cheese and is used most to construct those racks is called Pinus peuce.

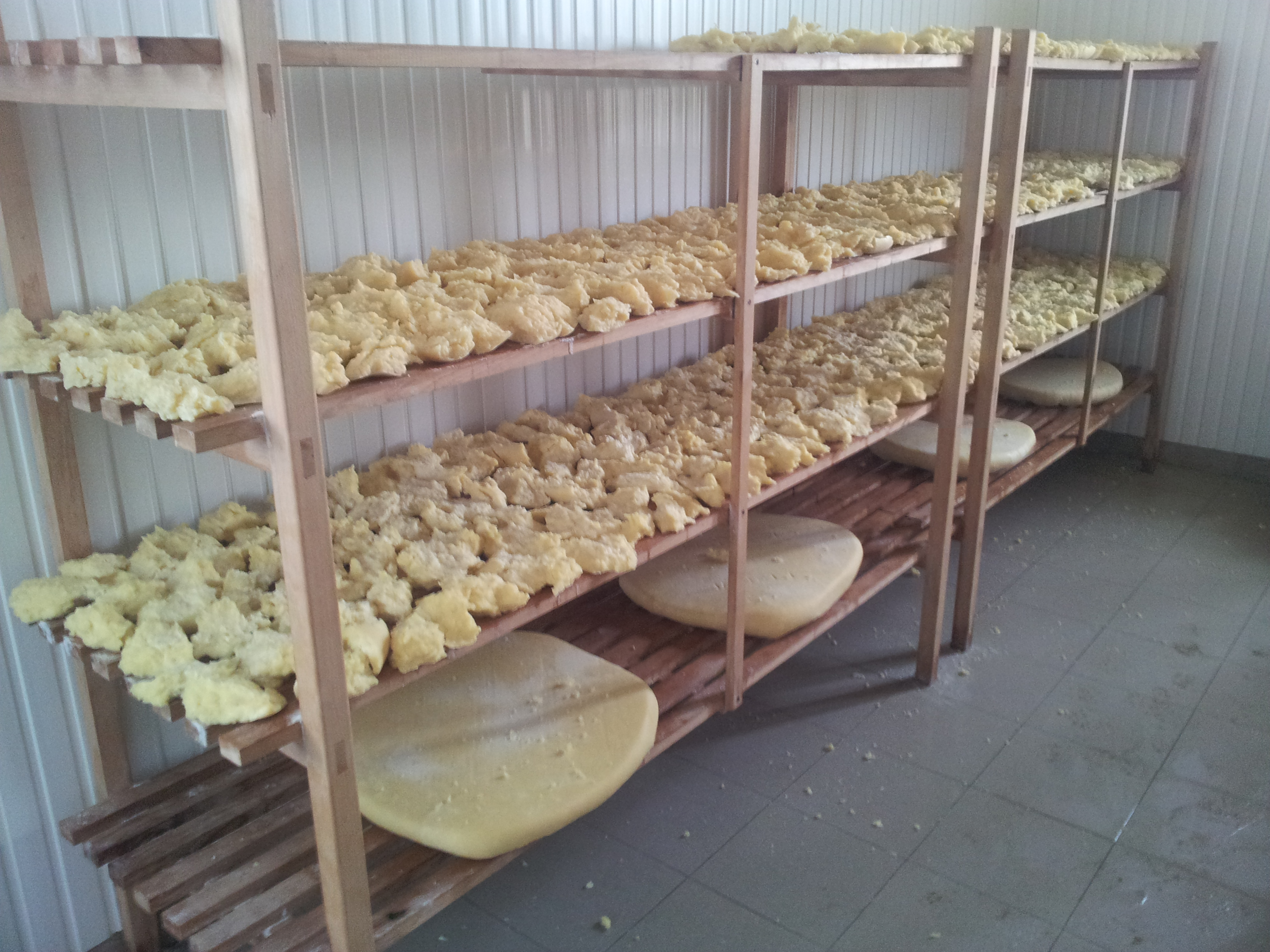
Production/drying

Total production of Sharr cheese is about 25 tones per year which is mainly produced in the region of Dragash from sheep and cow milk. Main characteristics related to Sharr cheese is availability during all year, quality, saltiness and equal presentation in all regions of Kosovo. While mostly produced in private households, the past decade has seen the rise of industrial Sharr cheese manufacturers. The majority of these entrepreneurs operate in and around Prizren, such as ABI Industry, a fruit and vegetable processing company which also makes this popular cheese. There is no significant difference between the traditional and industrial method of Sharr cheese production. The industrial version is made from pasteurized milk which is then fermented. Traditionally prepared cheese cannot be eaten until it has thoroughly absorbed the salt and has ripened, while industrially produced cheese is sent to the market after two weeks and can be eaten immediately. Veterans in industrial Sharr cheese production are the above-mentioned ABI and another Prizren factory – Sharri – which has been in this business for a decade. Sharr cheese is mostly sold across the region of the Western Balkans. However, since people from Kosovo live and work in Western Europe – for example in Germany and Switzerland – cheese manufacturers are visiting food fairs in these countries, hoping to enter the Western European markets.

== Flavors ==
There are two main variants of Sharr cheese: Traditional (Hard) and Soft. The main difference between the two is its state, although saltiness and smell can also vary. The soft variant has only later appeared whereas the traditional type has been produced in the same way since the beginning and is also the preferred flavor of the two.

Different kinds of cheese similar to Sharr cheese are White cheese and Cypriot Halloumi.

== Consumption ==
The consumption of Sharr cheese is dominant in Prizren, Ferizaj, and Prishtina even though it is consumed as well in other regions. Information shows that the traditional kind of Sharr cheese is bought more than the soft variety because of consumers’ preference of hard over soft Sharr cheese. The most bought brand of Sharr cheese in Kosovo is called “Sharri”.

Usually original Sharr cheese is sold in wooden buckets or plastic buckets in bigger quantities making the product specific. Price of sheep Sharr cheese might be between 5 and 7 Euro per kilogram while for cow Sharr cheese is around 4 Euros per kilogram. Usually regular consumers purchase higher quantities in wooden and plastic buckets from 5 to 20 kilograms The reason of the difference in price between sheep and cow Sharr cheese is the higher quality which is achieved by a higher percentage of fat in sheep milk. This makes the Sharr cheese produced by sheep milk the preferred flavor also because in the original days there was only sheep milk used.

== See also ==
- Cuisine of Albania
- Cuisine of Kosovo
