= Restelica =

Restelica: Restelicë (Albanian); Рестелица/Restelica (Serbian)
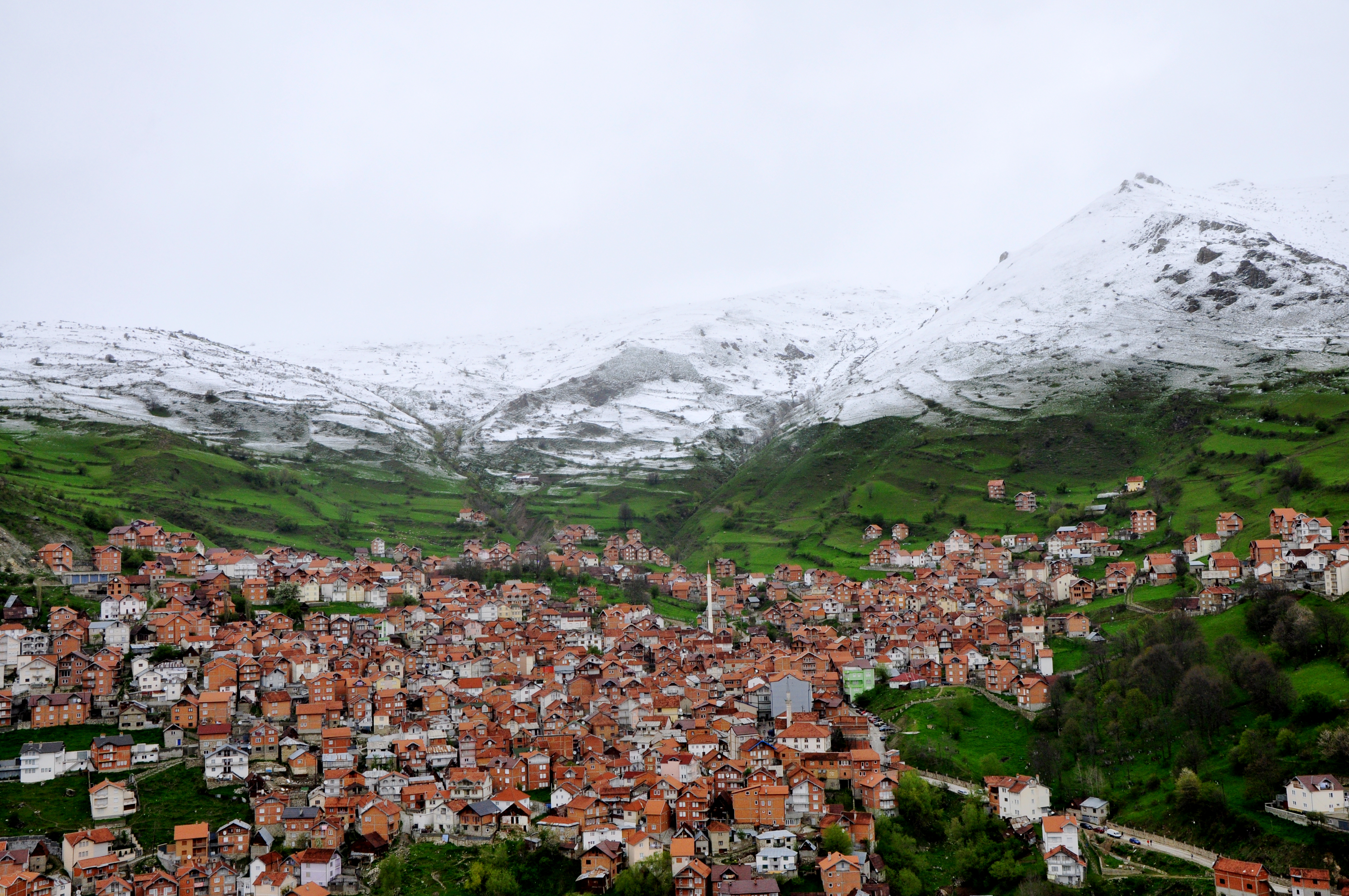
- Interactive map of Restelica
- Location in Kosovo
- Coordinates: 41.942822°N 20.668418°E
- Country: Kosovo
- District: Prizren
- Municipality: Dragash
- Elevation: 1,717 m (5,633 ft)

Population (2024)
  - Total: 2,630
- Time zone: UTC+1 (CET)
  - Summer (DST): UTC+2 (CEST)

Restelica (Serbian: Рестелица, romanized: Restelica, Albanian: Restelicë) is a Gorani village in the south of Kosovo, the largest in the municipality of Dragash, located in the Gora region.
