= Brrut =

Place in Dragash, Kosovo

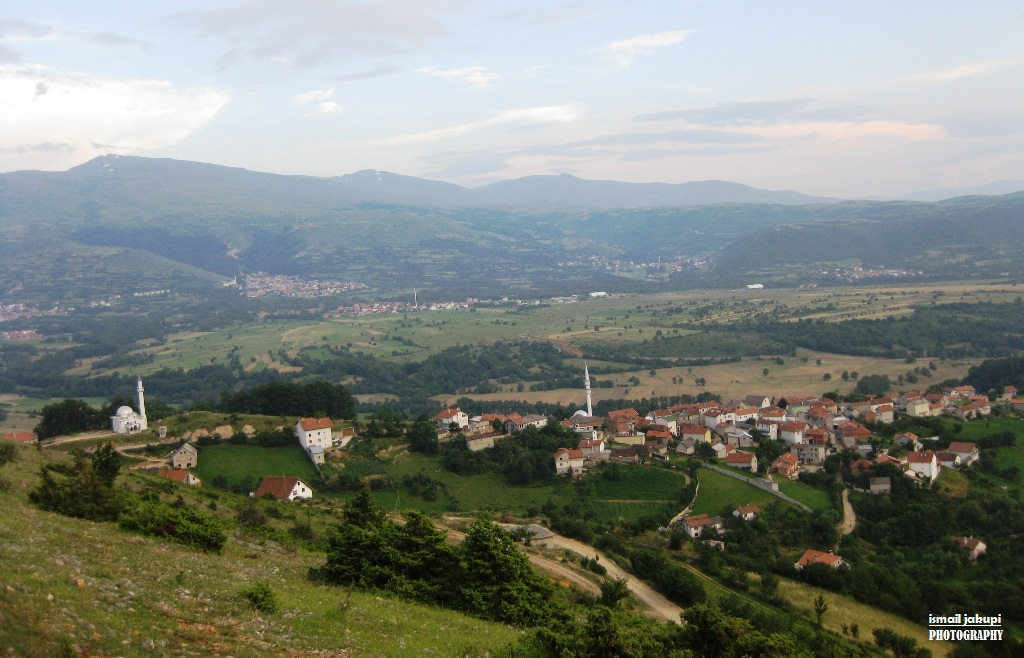
- Brruti-Madh and Brruti-Vogël
- Interactive map of Brrut
- Location within Kosovo
- Coordinates: 42°7′37″N 20°41′48″E
- Country: Kosovo
- District: Prizren
- Municipality: Dragash

Population (2024)
  - Total: 1,013
- Time zone: UTC+1 (CET)
  - Summer (DST): UTC+2 (CEST)

Brrut is a village in the south of Kosovo, in the municipality of Dragash, located the Opolje region of the Šar Mountains.

== Culture ==
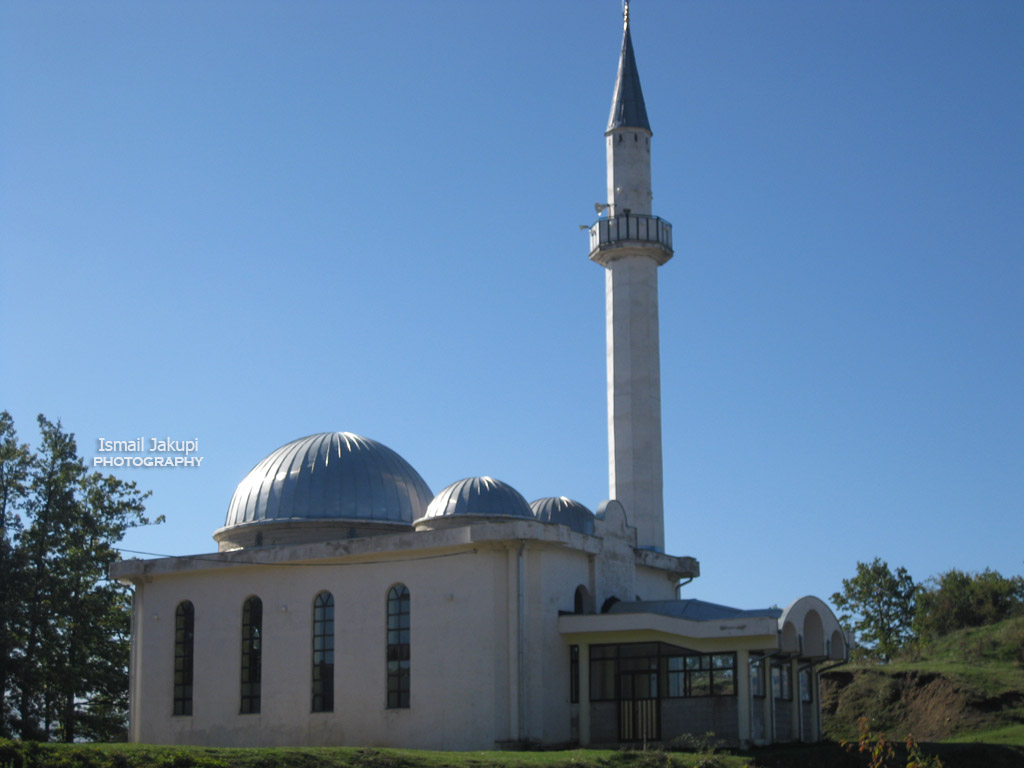
Brruti-Vogël Mosque

Brrut has two mosques which were built early and renovated in recent years. Brrut has several archaeological sites of importance for cultural heritage, including the ruins of an Albanian Orthodox castle and church, old cemeteries, burial grounds, etc. Brrut has traditional music, dance, horse racing and some pagan festivals like Summer on March 14, where a fire is lit for this holiday and traditional Flija food, the feast of harvest and St. George, Jeremiah St. Collie, Shiribudi etc.

In addition to this Brruti also has some traditional accessories (Loom, crochet, boshti, furka), for making traditional clothes even though this is no longer practiced, there are still people who know how to do it. Also a resident possesses seeds of a characteristic plant which is used to work different clothes and oil paintings for painting. Another important point is the fact that the peasants of Brrut, as well as the surrounding villages, attach great importance to marriage, betrothal and circumcision fest.

== Demographics ==
Population census
| Year | 1948 | 1953 | 1961 | 1971 | 1981 | 1991 | 2011 | 2024 |
| Pop. | 596 | 584 | 575 | 798 | 1,097 | 1,319 | 1,164 | 1,013 |
| ±% | — | −2.0% | −1.5% | +38.8% | +37.5% | +20.2% | −11.8% | −13.0% |
