= Shar =

Shar may refer to:

- shar (file format), an archive format created with the Unix shar utility
- Shar, Kazakhstan, a town in Zharma District
- Shar River, a left tributary of the Irtysh
- BAE Sea Harrier, a British VTOL aircraft nicknamed shar
- Shar (Forgotten Realms), a fictional goddess of the Forgotten Realms campaign setting for Dungeons & Dragons
- Shar Jackson (born 1976), American actress
- Shar, meaning strait in the Russian Pomor dialects
  - Matochkin Shar, an alternative name of the Matochkin Strait
  - Yugorsky Shar, an alternative name of the Yugorsky Strait
- SHAR, former name of the Satish Dhawan Space Centre, India
- Shar Mountains, a mountain range in Southeast Europe
- Shar, Libyan name for the Libyan genocide
- Shar' (Arabic: الشَّرْع aš-Šarʿ), another name for the Sharia

== See also ==
- Shahr, the Persian word for 'city'
- Shaar, surname
- Sharr (disambiguation)
