= Zaplluxhë =

Village in Prizren District, Kosovo

Zaplluxhë Zaplužje Заплужје
- Village
- Part of Zaplluxhë
- Interactive map of Zaplluxhë
- Location within Kosovo
- Coordinates: 42°7′47″N 20°45′20″E
- Country: Kosovo
- District: Prizren
- Municipality: Dragash

Population (2011)
  - Total: 1,273
- Time zone: UTC+1 (CET)
  - Summer (DST): UTC+2 (CEST)

Zaplluxhë (Serbian: Заплужје, romanized: Zaplužje) is a village in the municipality of Dragash, in the Prizren District of southern Kosovo. At the 2011 census it had 1,273 inhabitants, almost all of them ethnic Albanians.

== Names ==
The village is known in Albanian as Zaplluxhë (also written Zaplluzhë or Zaplluxha) and in Serbian as Zaplužje (Cyrillic: Заплужје). Other Albanian forms recorded include Zapluzhë and Zhapllushë.

== Geography ==
Zaplluxhë is a village in the Opoja region of Dragash municipality. The municipality lies in the southernmost part of Kosovo, bordering Albania and North Macedonia.

== Demographics ==
According to the 2011 census, Zaplluxhë had 1,273 inhabitants, of whom 1,270 declared themselves Albanian. Census figures show the population rising from 667 in 1948 to a peak of 1,504 in 1991, followed by a decline by 2011.

Population of Zaplluxhë
Census year	1948	1953	1961	1971	1981	1991	2011
Population	667	663	666	967	1,275	1,504	1,273

== Notable people ==
- Fahri Musliu – journalist; long-time Belgrade correspondent for Rilindja and, in 1999, the Voice of America; author of Montirani procesi protiv kosovskih Albanaca (1999–2001)
- Resul Sinani – journalist, television presenter and academic; long-time news anchor at Radio Television of Kosovo and dean of the Faculty of Mass Communication at AAB College
- Xhymret Veliu – journalist; editor-in-chief of Radio Television of Kosovo as of 2016
