= Al-Aga Mosque =

Oldest mosque in Southeastern Europe

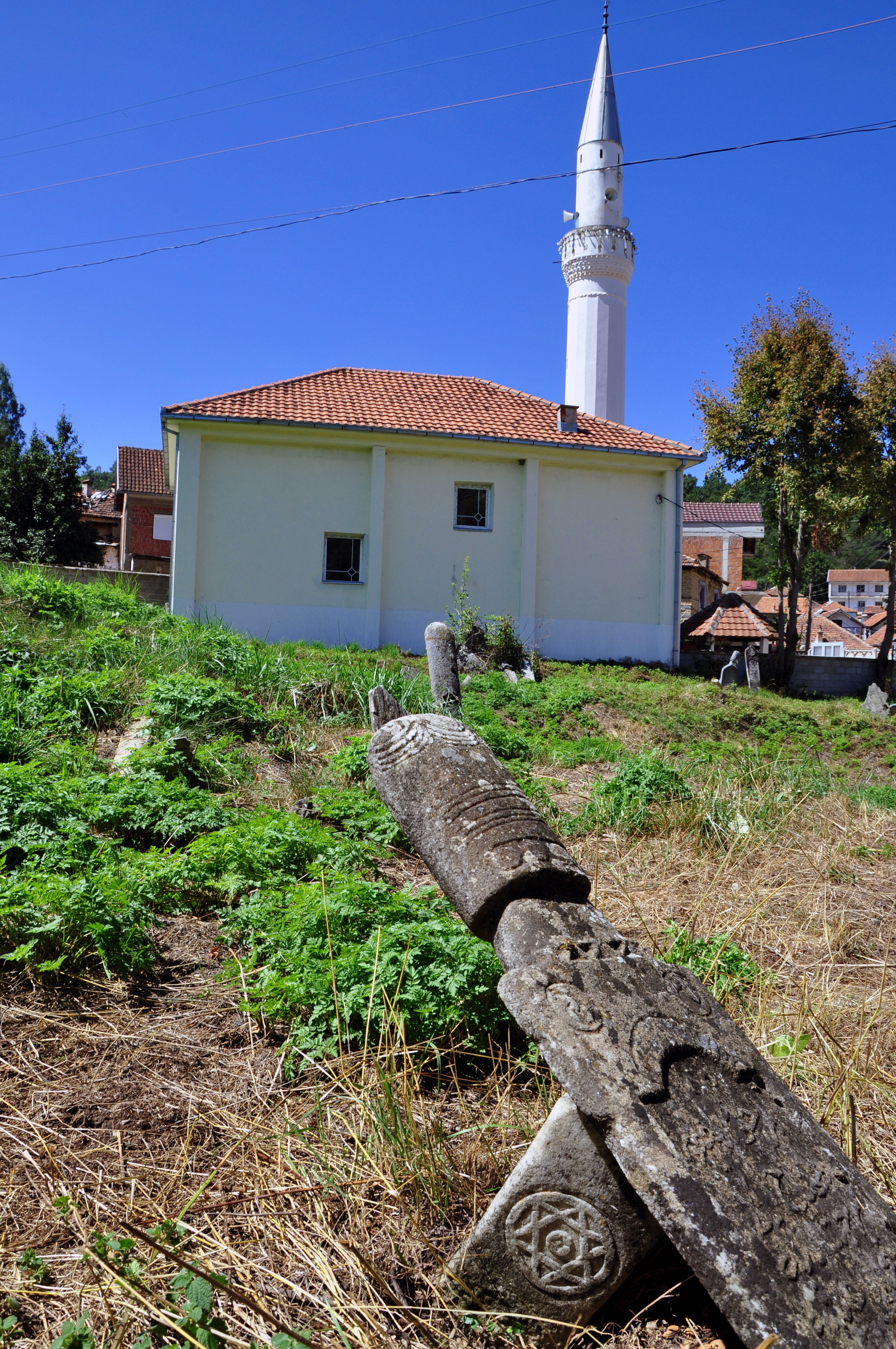

Religion
- Affiliation: Islam

Location
- Location: Dragash
- Country: Kosovo
- Interactive map of Al-Aga Mosque

Architecture
- Type: Mosque
- Completed: 1289; 737 years ago

The Al–Aga Mosque (Note: Also known as the Mlika Mosque (Albanian: Xhamia e Mlikës; Serbian: Мличка џамија, Mlička džamija), the Mosque of Haxhi Hussein (Albanian: Xhamia e Haxhi Hysenit) and the Ahmet Aga Mosque (Xhamia e Ahmet Agës)) is the oldest mosque in the Southeastern Europe. It is located in Dragash and was built in 1289.

According to the Islamic community council in Dragash, in 1995 they received a formal document by the Mufti office of Aleppo city, in Syria, where it stated that a family named Al-Aga had migrated from Aleppo to former Yugoslav territories, particularly in the area known as Mlika. This family, according to this document, began migrating in 1095 and continued until 1291. The mosque was restored in 1822 by Ahmed Agha.

This mosque lies in the southern part of Kosovo and has been reconstructed several times during its history, thanks to volunteer donations of the community. It is still active and offer services such as Friday (Juma) prayers.

== See also ==
- Architecture of Kosovo
- Islam in Kosovo
- Religion in Kosovo
