= Dragash =

Town and municipality in the District of Prizren, Kosovo

Dragash: Dragash or Sharr (Albanian) Dragaš or Драгаш (Serbian)
- Town and municipality
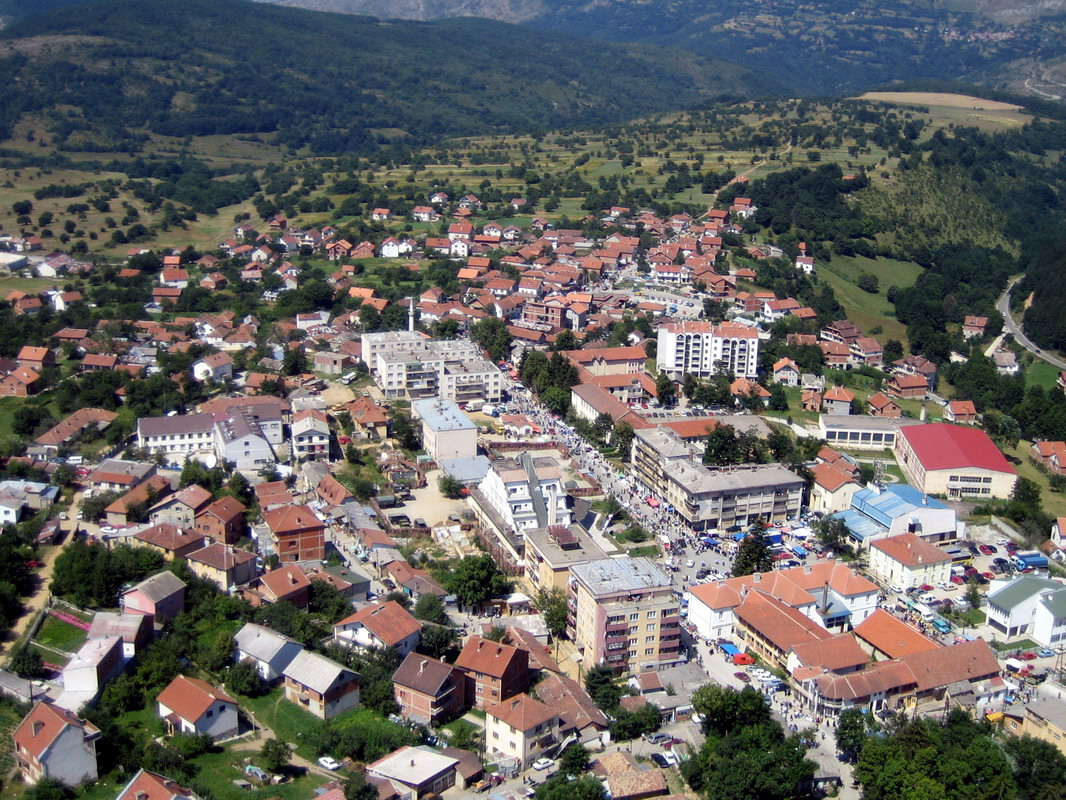

- Emblem
- Interactive map of Dragash
- Location within Kosovo
- Coordinates: 42°03′40″N 20°39′10″E
- Country: Kosovo
- District: Prizren
- Named for: Konstantin Dragaš

Government
  - Mayor: Bexhet Xheladini (LDK)

Area
  - Municipal: 430 km^{2} (170 sq mi)
  - Rank: 8th in Kosovo

Population (2024)
  - Municipal: 28,896
  - Density: 67/km^{2} (170/sq mi)
  - Urban: 1,332
  - Ethnicity: 60.74% Albanians; 27.09% Gorani; 10.03% Bosniaks; 2.14% Other
- Time zone: UTC+1 (CET)
  - Summer (DST): UTC+2 (CEST)
- Postal code: 22000
- Area code: +383
- Vehicle registration: 04
- Website: dragash.rks-gov.net

Dragash or Sharr (Albanian definite form: Dragashi or Sharri; Serbian: Dragaš; Serbian Cyrillic: Драгаш) is a town and municipality located in the Prizren District of Kosovo. According to the 2024 census, the town proper has population of 1,332 persons and the municipality has 28,896 inhabitants.

== Etymology ==
The Albanian name Sharri is a reference to the Sharr Mountains (in Albanian Sharr). Sharr can be traced to Albanian: sharrë meaning 'saw', denoting the jagged peaks and 'saw-toothed ridge'. The Serbian name Dragaš comes from medieval Serbian lord Constantine Dragaš.

== History ==
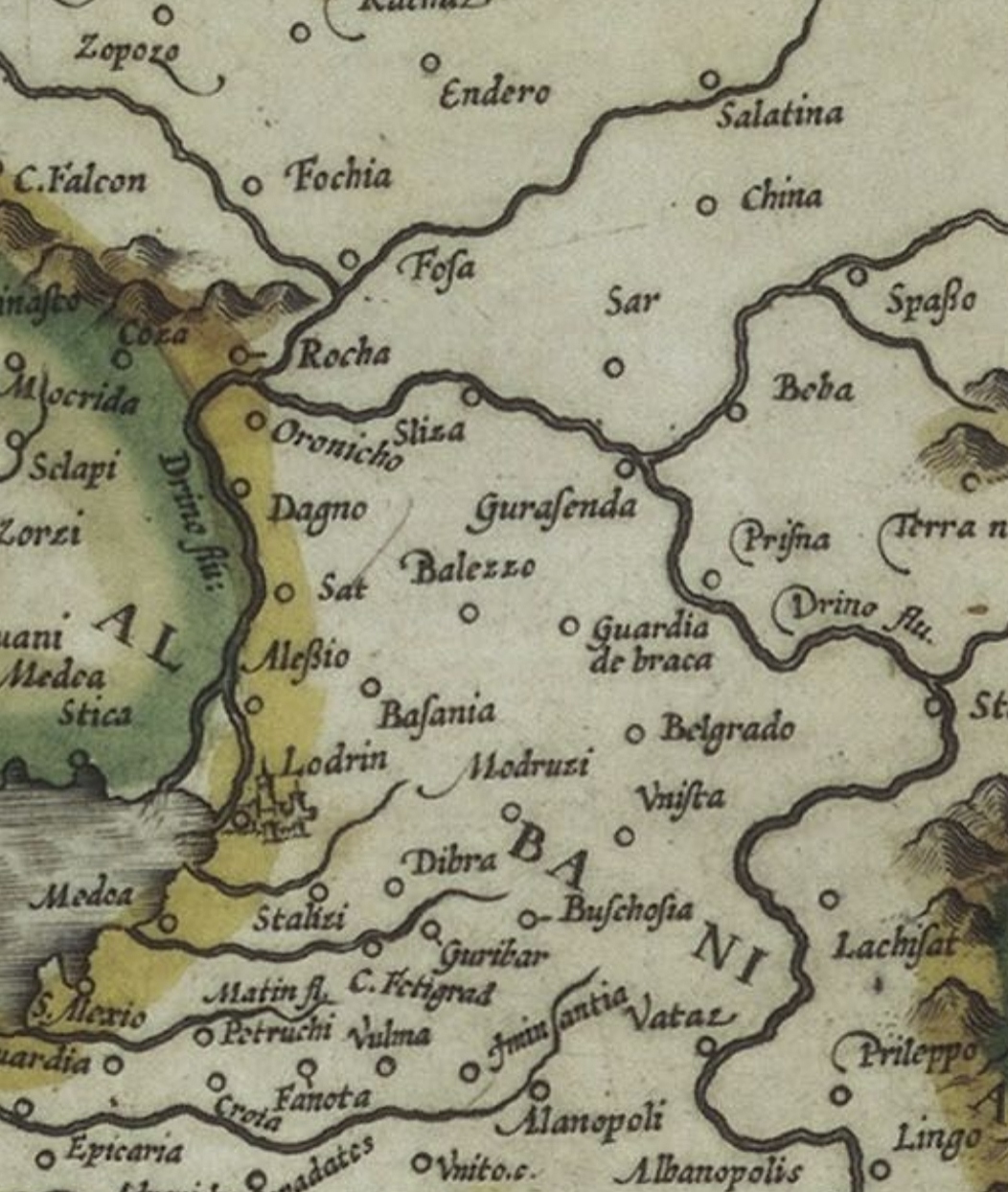
Map of Albania in 1630

The oldest mosque in Kosovo and in the Balkans was built in 1289 and it is called Al-Aga Mosque.

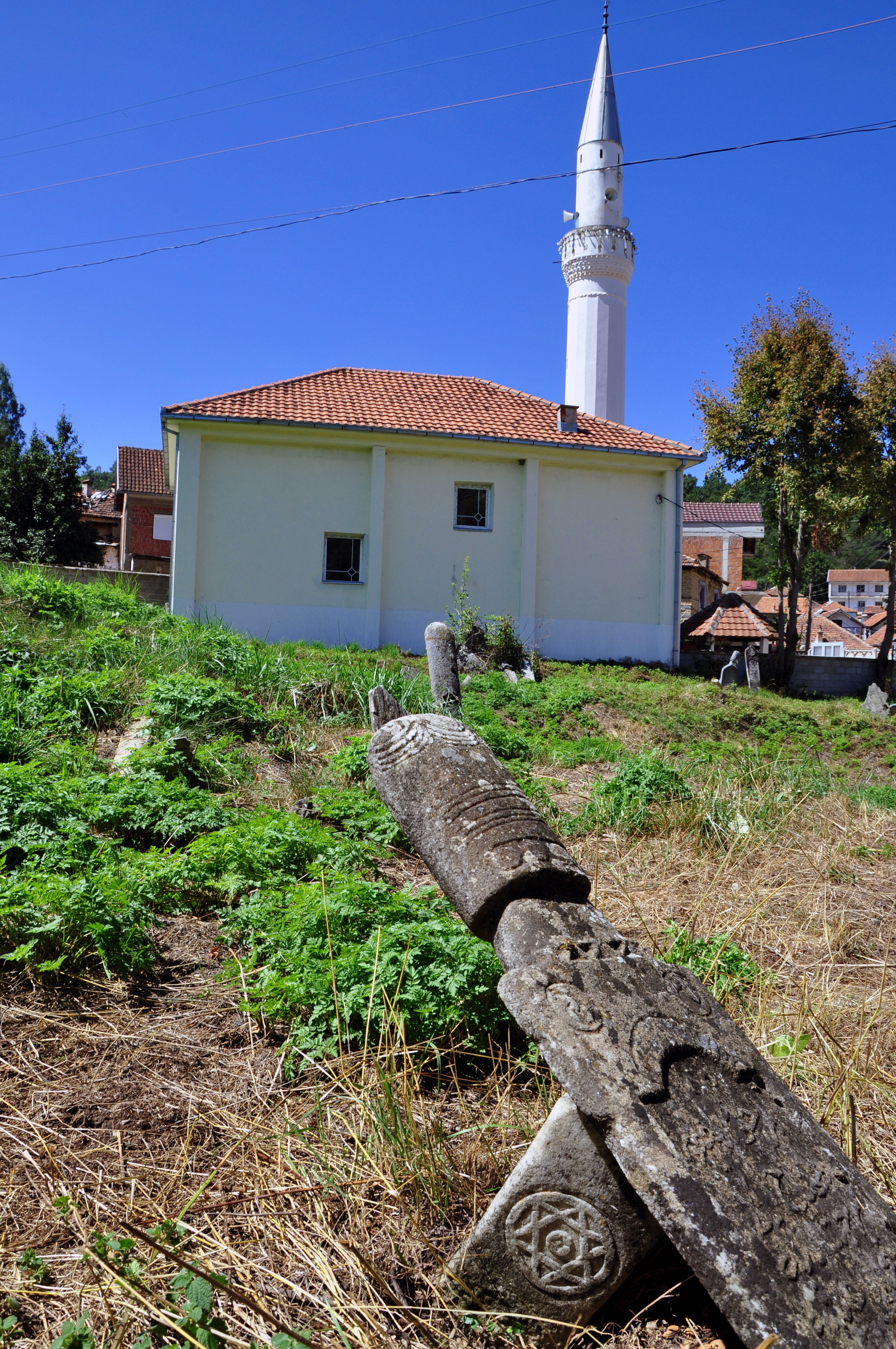
Al Aga Mosque is the oldest mosque in Kosovo as well as in the entire Balkan region.

Dragash was named after a Serbian medieval noble family of the same name which served Dušan the Mighty (r. 1331-1355) and Uroš the Weak (r. 1355-1371). From 1877 to 1913, Dragash was part of Kosovo Vilayet in the Ottoman Empire. From 1929 to 1941, Dragash was part of the Vardar Banovina of the Kingdom of Yugoslavia. In 1941, Yugoslavia came under Axis invasion, and Dragash became a part of Albania; first under the Debar prefecture and later in 1943 transferred to the Kosovo prefecture after German takeover. From 1945 to 1992 Dragash was part of the Socialist Autonomous Province of Kosovo within the Socialist Republic of Serbia and after its disintegration part of the significantly less autonomous Autonomous Province of Kosovo and Metohija within the Republic of Serbia of the Federal Republic of Yugoslavia until 1999. During the period between 1991 and the end of the Kosovo War in 1999, the area was claimed by the self-declared proto-state of Kosova, but it was never fully administered by its partially recognized government.

The Gora municipality and Opoja region (attached to Prizren municipality) remained separated during the Milošević period. During the Kosovo war, Albanians from Opoja fled to neighbouring Albania in cars, trucks and tractors along with others on foot who following the conflict returned home. After the war, the Gorani-majority Gora municipality was merged with the Albanian-inhabited Opoja region to form the municipality of Dragash by the United Nations Mission (UNMIK), and the new administrative unit has an Albanian majority.

The town of Dragash is the regional and municipal centre for both the Gora and Opoja regions of Dragash municipality. Following 1999, Dragash has a mixed population of Gorani, who live in the lower neighbourhood and Albanians in the upper neighbourhood that constitute the majority of inhabitants.

Apart from the multiethnic town of Dragash, the Gorani of Kosovo continue to live in villages primarily inhabited by their community in Gora, and relations with Albanians remain tense. Albanians predominantly live in the Opoja region. Mixed marriage between both communities do not occur, with the exception of a few Gorani families that have migrated to Prizren.

== Geography ==
The territory of the Dragash municipality lies in the northern latitude of 41 52' 30" to 42 09' 03" and longitude of 20 35' 39" to 20 48' 26". The whole territory is surrounded by the Šar Mountains, then Koritnik Mountain, mountain Gjalic and Cylen in the direction of Prizren. Only one part of the territory in Prizren direction is hilly with a relatively slight slope by which this territory is connected with Prizren basin and through Prizren with the world.

== Governance ==
Dragash Municipality

Aside from the town of Dragash, the following settlements comprise the municipality:

- Baçkë/Bačka
- Bellobrad/Belobrod
- Blaç/Bljač
- Breznë/Brezna
- Brod
- Brodosanë/Brodosavce
- Brrut/Brut
- Buçë/Buča
- Buzez/Buzec
- Dikancë/Dikance
- Glloboçicë/Globočica
- Kapër/Kapra
- Kërstec/Donji Krstac
- Kosavë/Kosovce
- Krushevë/Kruševo
- Kuk/Kukovce
- Kukjan/Kukuljane
- Kuklibeg
- Leshtan/Leštane
- Lubovishtë/Ljubovište
- Mlikë/Mlike
- Orçushë/Orčuša
- Plavë/Plava
- Pllajnik/Plajnik
- Radeshë/Radeša
- Rapçë/Gornja Rapča
- Rapçë/Donja Rapča
- Restelicë/Restelica
- Rrenc/Rence
- Shajnë/Šajinovac
- Vranishtë/Vranište
- Xërxë/Zrze
- Zaplluxhë/Zaplužje
- Zgatar
- Zlipotok/Zli Potok
- Zym/Zjum Opoljski

The former emblem of Dragash included an image of the Šarplaninac dog. Another symbol of Dragash is Sharr cheese.

== Economy ==
The main employers in the area are the Municipality, Kosovo Police, and private companies such as KUK Commerc, Meka and former state-owned enterprises.

All major local companies were formerly state-run and, as elsewhere in Kosovo, are currently under the responsibility of KTA. The original UNMIK strategy towards these public enterprises consisted of carrying out a process of 'commercialisation'. This process was believed to be the best way to revive the enterprises, although no foreign investors decided to invest.

== Infrastructure ==
The municipality is mountainous and therefore has related infrastructural problems (e.g. problematic access to some villages during winter season). Its infrastructure was in a state of serious disrepair before the war, due to a combination of harsh winters and state neglect. Roads, in particular, (Zhur–Dragash; Dragash-Brod; Dragash-Restelica) require urgent improvement for the social-economic development of the area. Bus connections between Dragash town and the Opoja area continue to improve and the services to Gora are organized by the two OSCE-SIMF buses donated to the municipality. There is a free school bus service provided by the municipality along Gora routes. Taxi services exist but are largely unaffordable for the population. OSCE through SIMF/ ECSF funds supported also the rehabilitation of the Heath House.

Mobile coverage is also improving. Water supply is ensured in all villages.

== Demography ==
Historical population
Year	Pop.	±% p.a.
1971	26,850	—
1981	35,054	+2.70%
1991	39,435	+1.18%
2011	34,827	−0.62%
2024	28,896	−1.43%

According to the last official census done in 2011, the municipality of Dragash has 34,827 inhabitants. Based on the population estimates from the Kosovo Agency of Statistics in 2016, the municipality has 34,349 inhabitants. The municipality's population mostly lives in rural areas (97%).

The municipality is split into the regions of Opolje and Gora. Most of the Gorani live in Gora, whilst most Albanians live in Opoja and are majority population of whole municipality.

Due to geopolitical circumstances, some of the local Gorani people have over time self declared themselves as Albanians, Macedonians, Bosniaks, Muslim Bulgarians, Serbs, Turks and Muslims (nationality).

The ethnic composition of the municipality:

- 1971 – 13,867 (51.6%) Albanians; 11,076 (41.3%) Gorani and Bosniaks – total 26,850
- 1981 – 18,623 (53%) Albanians; 15,942 (45.5%) Gorani and Bosniaks – total 35,054
- 1991 – 22,785 (57.8%) Albanians; 16,129 (40.9%) Gorani and Bosniaks – total 39,435
- 2011 - 20,287 (59.6%) Albanians; 13,057 (38.4%) Gorani and Bosniaks - total 33,997

OSCE estimates say the following:

- January 1999 – 27,633 (61.3%) Albanians; 17,470 (38.7%) Gorani and Bosniaks – total 45,103
- March 2000 – 24,856 (78%) Albanians; 9,706 (28.1%) Gorani and Bosniaks – total 34,562
- January 2006 – 22,800 (55.9%) Albanians; 17,975 (44.1%) Gorani and Bosniaks – total 40,775

According to the census in 2011, a significant number of people (4,100) self identified as Bosniaks in the municipality.

== Bibliography ==
- Gora, Opolje i Sredska. Geografski institut "Jovan Cvijić" SANU. 1997. ISBN 978-86-80029-04-7.
- Milisav V. Lutovac (1955). Gora i Opolje: antropogeografska proučavanja. Naučna knjiga.
