= Opolje =

Geographic region in Kosovo

Coordinates: 42°03′38″N 20°38′25″E

Opolje Опоље Opoja
- Geographic region in Kosovo
- The region and its settlements.
- Country: Kosovo
- District: District of Prizren
- Municipality: Prizren

Area
  - Total: 108 km^{2} (42 sq mi)

Population (1981)
  - Total: 18,036
  - Density: 167/km^{2} (433/sq mi)

Opolje (Albanian: Opoja/Opojë; Serbian: Опоље) is a region in the southern part of the municipality of Prizren in southern Kosovo. The region has 19 villages mainly inhabited by Kosovo Albanians.

== Settlements ==
The region of Opolje includes 18 settlements:

- Bellobrad
- Blaç
- Breznë
- Bresanë
- Brrut
- Buqe
- Buzez
- Kapre
- Kosavë
- Kuklibeg
- Kuk
- Plajnik
- Plavë
- Rrencë
- Zaplluxhë
- Zgatar
- Zym
- Xërxë

== Name ==
The naming of towns and cities in ancient times, especially during the Hellenization period in the Balkans, was done by adding the word "polis" to the founder's name. The names of some cities are compound formations, expanding with the addition of the suffix -o from an anthroponym and the lemma -polis (-pol): Konstantin-o-polis, (Konstantin-o-pol), for Istanbul; Alban-o-polis, (Alban-o-pol) for Zgërdhesh of Kruja; Adrian-o-polis, (Adrian-o-pol) for Nëprevishat of Gjirokastra, etc. The evolution from O-polis to Opojë and Opolje follows a similar pattern.

According to Milisav Lutovac, the name is of Slavic origin and "had to do with the inhabited localities dotted around a field". The name also appears in Lower Silesia, in Poland - Opole, and in Russia - Opolye.

== Geography ==
Gora, in a collective term, refers to both the Gorani-inhabited Gora (which greater part is in Kosovo, the rest in Albania and Macedonia), and its sub-region Opojë, which is inhabited by Albanians. According to the Serbian Academy of Sciences and Arts (1955), Opolje had an area of ca. 108 km^{2}, while Gora had an area of ca. 500 km^{2}. Sheltered by high mountain ranges of strong and cold winds, Gora and Opolje do not have harsh winters. There is no natural border between Gora and Opojë, while the northern part of the town of Dragash has been considered part of Opojë as well.

Opolje is one of the traditional župa (county) in the Šar Mountains massif in southern Kosovo, alongside Sredačka Župa, Sirinićka Župa, Gora and Prizrenski Podgor. In the west of Opolje is the region of Luma, which extends in both Kosovo and Albania.

== History ==
=== Middle Ages ===
The Serbian rulers King Stephen Uroš III (in 1326) and Emperor Stephen Dušan (in 1348, 1355) mentioned many of the Opolje and Gora villages in their charters, which shows that they existed before those dates. Opolje was a church estate of the Church of the Holy Theotokos in Prizren throughout the Middle Ages.

The surrounding region contains a large number of Aromanian toponyms, which Dumbrowski argues, reflect the linguistic situation before Slavification.

In one of Nemanja’s charters giving property to Hilandar, 170 Vlachs are mentioned, located in villages around Prizren. When Dečanski founded his monastery of Dečani in 1330, he referred to ‘villages and katuns of Vlachs and Albanians’ in the area of the white Drin. King Stefan Dečanski granted the Visoki Dečani monastery with pasture land along with Vlach and Albanian katuns around Drim and Lim rivers of whom had to carry salt and provide serf labour for the monastery.

=== Ottoman era ===
In 1455, the southern territories of the Serbian Despotate were annexed by the Ottomans, and organised into the beylerbeylik of Rumelia. Gora, in its broadest meaning, became a nahiyah of the Sanjak of Prizren. The Ottoman conquest resulted in the old trade routes that linked the Adriatic to the Aegean and Black sea lost their importance because of the insecurity on the roads, and the towns and villages along the roads stopped growing. There are no sources which name Opolje a nahiya in the 15th century. Ottoman cadastral records indicate that the Opolje region was inhabited by a dominant Albanian majority of mixed Muslim, Orthodox and Catholic faith during the 15th-16th centuries due to the anthroponomy present; additionally, most of the region was islamised by 1571. In the second half of the 16th century, the Ottoman defters of 1571 and 1591 indicated that Opolje had become a territorial administrative division with a dominant Timar system. 18 timars were recorded in the 23 villages of Opolje in 1571, and 13 timars in 1591. At the end of the 16th century, in the Nahiya of Opolje, of the 27 newly-Islamised households spread across 9 villages, 24 had Albanian last names and only 3 had Slavic last names. Of the 37 Christian households spread across 8 villages, 36 had Albanian or Albanian-Slav anthroponomy whereas only 1 had Slavic anthroponomy. Of the 23 field owners of the Nahiya, 18 had Albanian names and 5 had Slavic names.

A prominent family of Opolje in the 16th century emerged in the new social environment. The Kuka, descendants of Iljaz Kuka built many public buildings, trade routes, shops and left a large endowment (waqf) to the city of Prizren. The mosque of Iljaz Kuka, rebuilt by his grandson Mehmed Bey Kuka (known as Kukli Bey) is one of the oldest mosques of Prizren.

=== Modern ===
Opolje and other rural areas of the upper Drin valleys were economically tied to Prizren.

From 1945 to sometime after 1981, Opolje was part of the municipality of Gora, but was then given status of a municipality (due to its Albanian population, as opposed to Gora, which was inhabited by Gorani people). It was abolished on November 3, 1992, under the law of the federal Federal Yugoslav Republic of Serbia, and instead joined into the municipality of Prizren. The Gora municipality and Opolje region remained separated during the Milošević period.

During the Kosovo war (1999), Albanians from Opolje fled to neighbouring Albania in cars, trucks and tractors along with others on foot that following the conflict returned home. After the war, Opolje was merged with Gora to form the municipality of Dragash by the United Nations Mission (UNMIK) and the new administrative unit has an Albanian majority. Located in Gora, the town of Dragash is the regional and municipal centre for both the Opolje and Gora regions of Dragash municipality.

== Demographics ==
The population of Opolje, in 19 localities, is totally homogeneously Albanian. According to the 1981 census, Albanians constituted 99.9% of the Opolje population (18,003 of 18,036). The ethnic homogeneity of Opolje dates from long before, as evident from the 1948, 1953 and 1961 censuses, when 99.8% declared as Albanians. Opolje had an annual population growth in 1961-1971 of 33 per 1,000, and in 1971-1981, 29.8 per 1,000, which represents an enormous relative overpopulation (Albanian population boom); according to estimates for 1991, there were 173 people per 1 square kilometre, and in some villages, up to 250 per 1 square kilometre, all in conditions of scarce natural and economic resources. The majority professes Islam.

Preliminary 1981 census, Opojë settlements
Settlement	Pop.	Ethnic groups
Bellobrad	808	A, 808 (100%)
Blaç	1122	A, 1122 (100%)
Breznë	1971	A, 1964 (%); S, 1 (%); M, 6 (%)
Bresanë	2499	A, 2499 (100%)
Brrut	1095	A, 1094 (99.9%); O, 1 (0.1%)
Buqe	770	A, 767 (); S, 1 (); M, 1 (); O, 1 ()
Buzez	240	A, 240 (100%)
Kaprë	482	A, 482 (100%)
Kosavë	912	A, 912 (100%)
Kuklibeg	658	A, 655; M, 2; O, 1
Kuk	1334	A, 1334 (100%)
Plajnik	528	A, 528 (100%)
Plavë	973	A, 970; M, 3
Rrencë	473	A, 473 (100%)
Shajnë	1254	A, 1252; M, 2
Zaplluzhë	1273	A, 1270; M, 3
Zgatar	822	A, 821; M, 1
Zym	457	A, 455; M, 2
Xërxë	335	A, 333; M, 2
Total	? (%), ? (%)	? (%), ? (%)
A - Albanians, M - Muslims, S - Serbs, O - Others

== Gallery ==
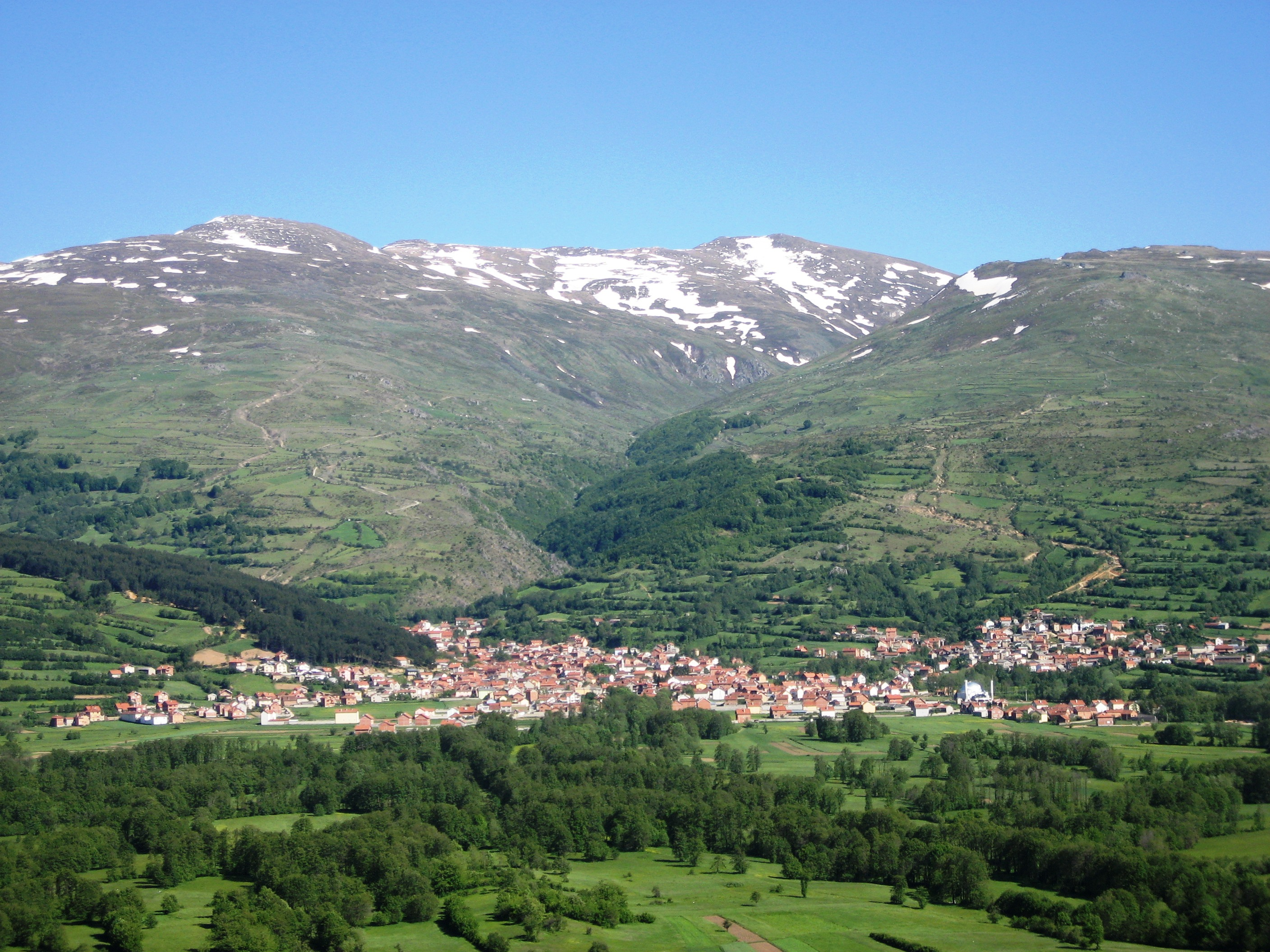
Bresana

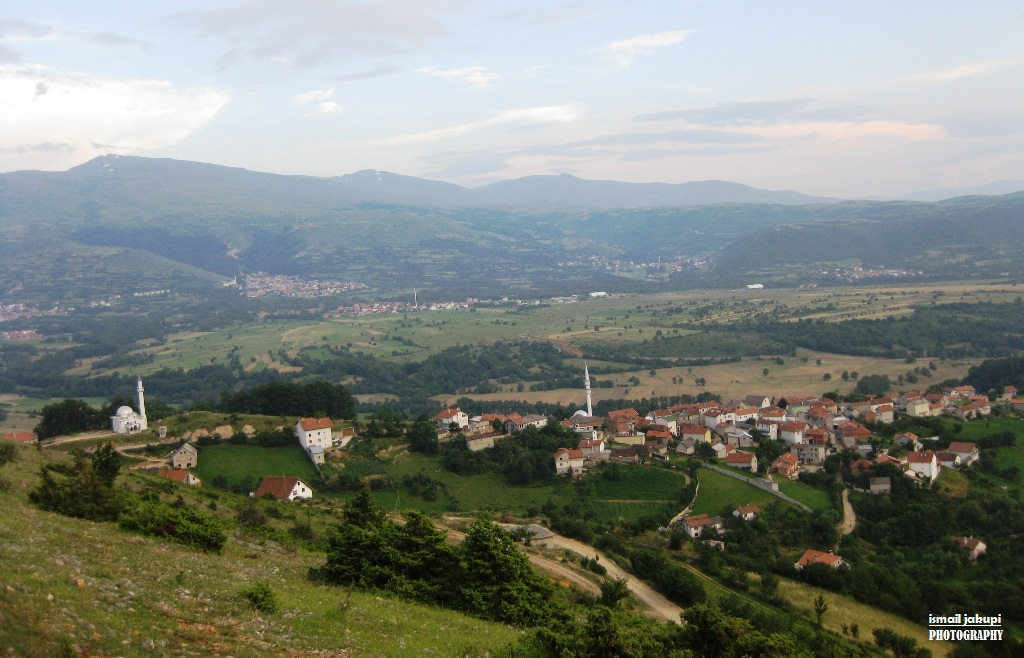
Brut
