= Kukës District =

Defunct (2000) Albanian administrative area

- Former district
- Coordinates: 41°58′N 20°25′E
- Country: Albania
- Dissolved: 2000
- Seat: Kukës

Area
  - Total: 956 km^{2} (369 sq mi)

Population (2001)
  - Total: 64,054
  - Density: 67.0/km^{2} (174/sq mi)
- Time zone: UTC+1 (CET)
  - Summer (DST): UTC+2 (CEST)

Kukës District (Albanian: Rrethi i Kukësit) was one of the 36 districts of Albania, which were dissolved in July 2000 and replaced by 12 counties. It had a population of 64,054 in 2001, and an area of 956 km^{2} (369 sq mi). The town of Kukës was where the district's administrative headquarters were located. The area of the former district is coextensive with the present municipality of Kukës, which is part of Kukës County.

== Administrative divisions ==
The district consisted of the following municipalities:

- Arrën
- Bicaj
- Bushtricë
- Grykë-Çajë
- Kalis
- Kolsh
- **Kukës**
- Malzi
- Shishtavec
- Shtiqën
- Surroj
- Tërthore
- Topojan
- Ujëmisht
- Zapod

Note: - urban municipalities in bold

== Geography ==
The district lies in the northeastern part of Albania and is bordered by District of Prizren in the east and northeast, by Has District in the north, by Pukë District and Mirditë District in the west and by Dibër District in the south.
