= Battle of Lumë =

Part of the First Balkan War

- Part of First Balkan War
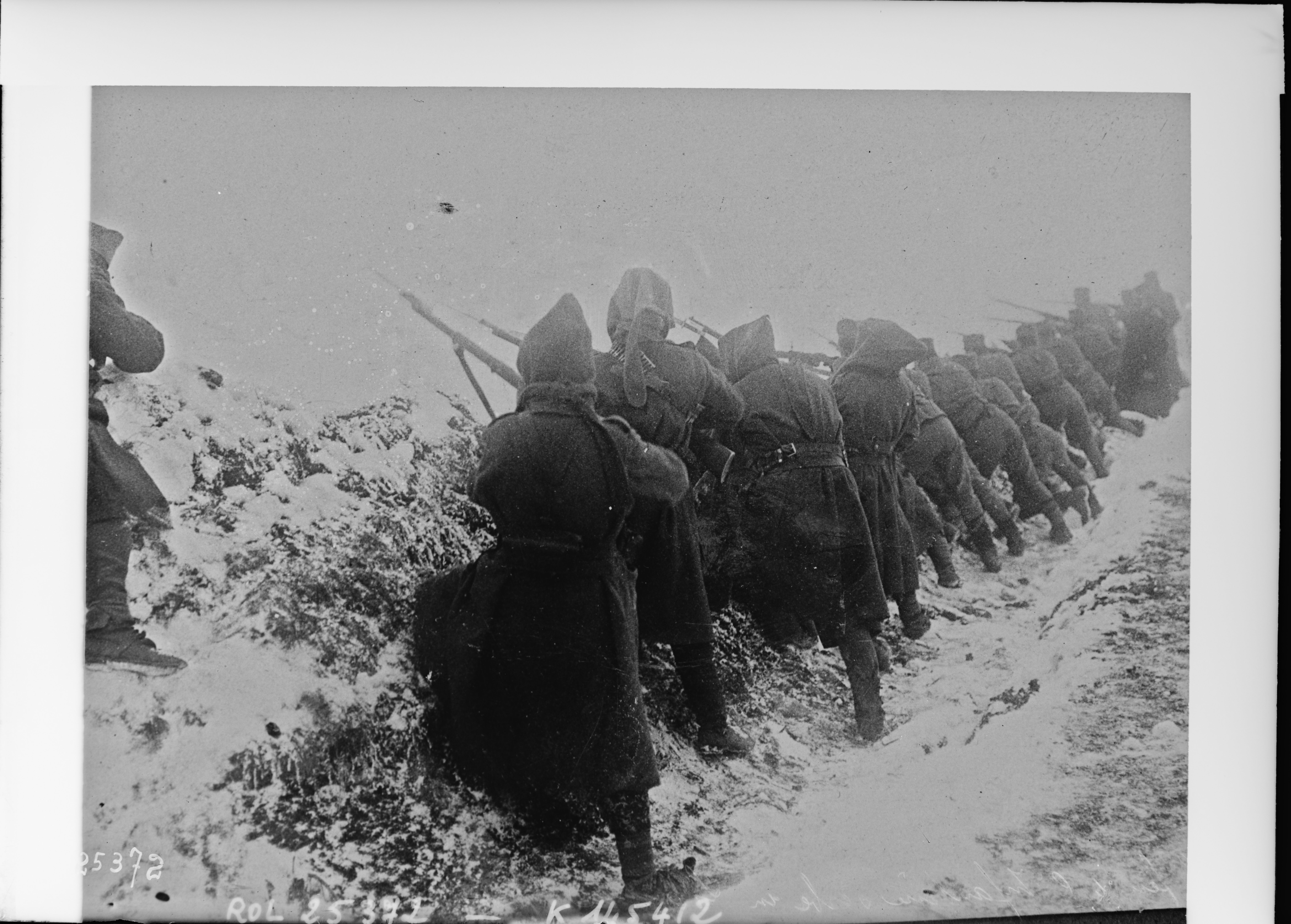
- Serbian infantry in Luma
Date	15 November – 5 December 1912
Location	Lumë, Sanjak of Prizren, Ottoman Empire (modern-day Albania)
Result	Serbian military victory

Belligerents
Kingdom of Serbia	Albanian irregulars

Commanders and leaders
(Serbia) Božidar Janković	Elez Isufi; Isuf Xhelili; Xhafer Doda; Ramadan Zaskoci; Islam Spahiu

Strength
8 battalions	2,000 fighters 2 artillery pieces

Casualties and losses
176–198 dead 31–88 wounded	200 dead Severe destruction of villages
- Thousands of Albanian civilians massacred during and following the battle

The Battle of Lumë (Albanian: Beteja e Lumës, Serbian Cyrillic: Битка у Љуми) was a series of clashes during the First Balkan War between Albanian local forces and the army of the Kingdom of Serbia. The conflict took place between 15 November and 5 December 1912 in the Lumë.

During the First Balkan War, Serbian forces took advantage of the power vacuum left by the crumbling Ottoman Empire to invade and conquer Luma region in late October and early November 1912. While Serbian and Montenegrin forces generally faced minimal resistance from local Albanian irregulars, the tribes of the Luma region proved to be a exception. Their ability to successfully counter the advancing units was largely attributed to the highly challenging and advantageous mountainous terrain they utilized for their defense. Though, the rebellion was soon suppressed and the Serbian army established firm military rule over the territory.

During the operations and the following occupation, the Serbian government conducted systematic massacres, rapes, destruction of villages, and other atrocities against the civilian population that devastated the region. The war crimes were part of a larger campaign to ethnically cleanse the region of Albanians. Atrocities in Luma were likened to colonial era genocidal campaigns.

== Albanian uprising ==
The initial Serbian march through this area toward the Adriatic Sea was carried out peacefully and in close cooperation with several local tribes, particularly the Mirditë. However, as soon as strong Serbian detachments reached the coast and engaged Ottoman forces, revolts broke out in their rear, prompting the Serbian Third Army to undertake the disarming of villages along the main routes. The entrance of Serbian forces into Luma was accompanied by clashes, property destruction, and the burning of houses, which prompted a localized rebellion. In early November 1912, four detachments of the Šumadija Division I were dispatched to the Prizren region with orders to disarm the local population, with explicit instructions to act "mercilessly" if resistance was encountered. Between 8 and 13 November, Serbian units secured various sectors including Opoja, Gora, and Has. As the Serbian Third Army brought in major reinforcements from Kosovo and Macedonia, self-organized Albanian fighters were initially forced to retreat toward the banks of the White Drin and Mount Koritnik. General Božidar Janković, commander of the Third Army, issued an ultimatum to the people of Luma, demanding that their leaders and clerics surrender for negotiations and that the population hand over their weapons. Furthermore, the army demanded that the locals disarm Albanian fighters who had arrived from other parts of Kosovo, or reveal the exact locations of rebel leaders such as Isa Boletini, Ramadan Zaskoci, Riza Bey, Islam Spahiu, and Bajram Daklani. The Serbian command also required Luma's leaders to guide their troops through the villages, inform on the resistance, and provide five hostages from each village to be sent to Prizren, threatening to bombard their properties and villages if these conditions were not met.

The local population rejected these terms and continued their resistance, heavily supported by reinforcements from neighboring areas such as Dibra, Opoja, and Gora, led by prominent local figures including Elez Isufi, Isuf Xhelili, Xhafer Doda, Ramadan Zaskoci, and Islam Spahiu. Notably, prominent fighters like Isa Boletini were already engaged in clashes against the Serbian army in Kolesjan during this period. On 9 November, the Luma Detachment—comprising the 3rd Battalion of the 10th Infantry Regiment and a machine-gun section—reached Lumë kulla. Sensing that the local population was preparing for combat, the commander requested reinforcements. On 13 November, the 4th Battalion and a platoon of mountain artillery arrived. Meanwhile, the 3rd Battalion moved through Luma, struggling to cross the swollen Šija river to reach the village of Bicaj. As Serbian patrols began disarming local villages, Ljusna, Kondas, and Ujëmisht refused to comply and prepared for defense. By 14 November, the 3rd Battalion held a position on the left bank of the Šija, though the front was overextended and tactically compromised; the right flank was exposed to fire from across the Black Drin, and the left was vulnerable to encirclement from the slopes of Mount Gjallica. Furthermore, the swollen Šija river trapped the battalion’s supply and medical stations behind them.

At first, an estimated 600 to 800 Albanians were engaged. However, this force grew, and approximately 2,000 Albanian fighters, supported by two slow-firing artillery pieces, deployed in a horseshoe formation, encircling the Serbian positions from the east and west. On 15 November, the conflict escalated into a full-scale battle, and the region entered a state of active warfare that lasted for three days. Between 15 November and early December, intense fighting continued in Luma as local irregular units mounted fierce resistance. The Serbian mountain artillery, having crossed the river late and lacking necessary sighting and range-finding equipment, proved ineffective. Despite fierce fighting and attempts by a rifle company to take the dominant heights of Mount Gjallica, the terrain—characterized by steep slopes and rugged rock—rendered the maneuver unsuccessful. On 16 November, under sustained pressure and sudden flanking fire from the direction of Bicaj and Kolesjan, Serbian lines began to collapse. Recognizing the numerical superiority of the rebels, the commander of the 10th Regiment ordered a retreat to the right bank of the Luma river. However, as the crossing was not pre-organized and the water levels were too high to wade, the detachment remained split and disordered overnight.

In the dawn of 17 November, the detachment retreated toward Podbreg and Lumë kulla under heavy fire. The Serbian forces, exhausted, starving, and demoralized, were eventually forced back to Vërmica, essentially retreating as far as Prizren. The Luma Detachment suffered heavy casualties in the process, with many soldiers and horses drowning in the river during the chaotic withdrawal. Official military records place Serbian losses at 176 to 198 dead and 31 to 88 wounded. Contemporary wartime communications from the period reflect highly inflated claims regarding casualties; a primary report forwarded by Aqif Pasha Elbasani to the Albanian government claimed that local forces had killed nearly six battalions of Serbian soldiers and forced the remainder out of Luma.

Following the clashes, the Serbian military utilized its overwhelming numerical and material superiority. According to the Zadar-based newspaper Narodni list (14 December 1912) and subsequent Serbian military documents, following bloody engagements at the Vizier's Bridge, Lumë kulla, the Luma plain, and the slopes of Mount Gjallica and Kolesjan down to the Black Drin, no village was left unlooted or unburned. The scale of the destruction and massacres was so extensive that contemporary reports stated "Luma no longer exists." Reports of these events reached British Foreign Secretary Edward Grey, who raised the issue with the Serbian representative in London; in response, Serbian Prime Minister Nikola Pašić instructed his diplomats to explicitly deny the reports.

The conflict in the region was further complicated by heightened diplomatic tensions known as the "Prochaska Affair." Serbian authorities explicitly blamed the Austro-Hungarian consul in Prizren, Oskar Prochaska, for clandestine activities aimed at instigating the local Albanian population to armed resistance by promising them Austro-Hungarian assistance. While this diplomatic scandal was shaking public opinion in Austria, the Serbian Third Army compiled a dossier on the case. Tensions had peaked earlier when Prochaska mail, sent on 23 October, was seized by Serbian forces at the post office in Ferizaj (Uroševac). In these letters, the consul labeled the Serbs and Montenegrins as "savages" and claimed that the Serbian army had bombarded, burned, and massacred the inhabitants of Pristina—a claim the Serbian command vehemently denied, asserting that peaceful inhabitants were protected. Furthermore, Prochaska reported the presence of 3,000 Albanians from Luma in Prizren. These intercepted letters were immediately handed over to the Supreme Command and Prince Alexander, fueling the Serbian conviction that the uprisings in their rear were being actively orchestrated by foreign powers.

== Serbian counter-offensive ==
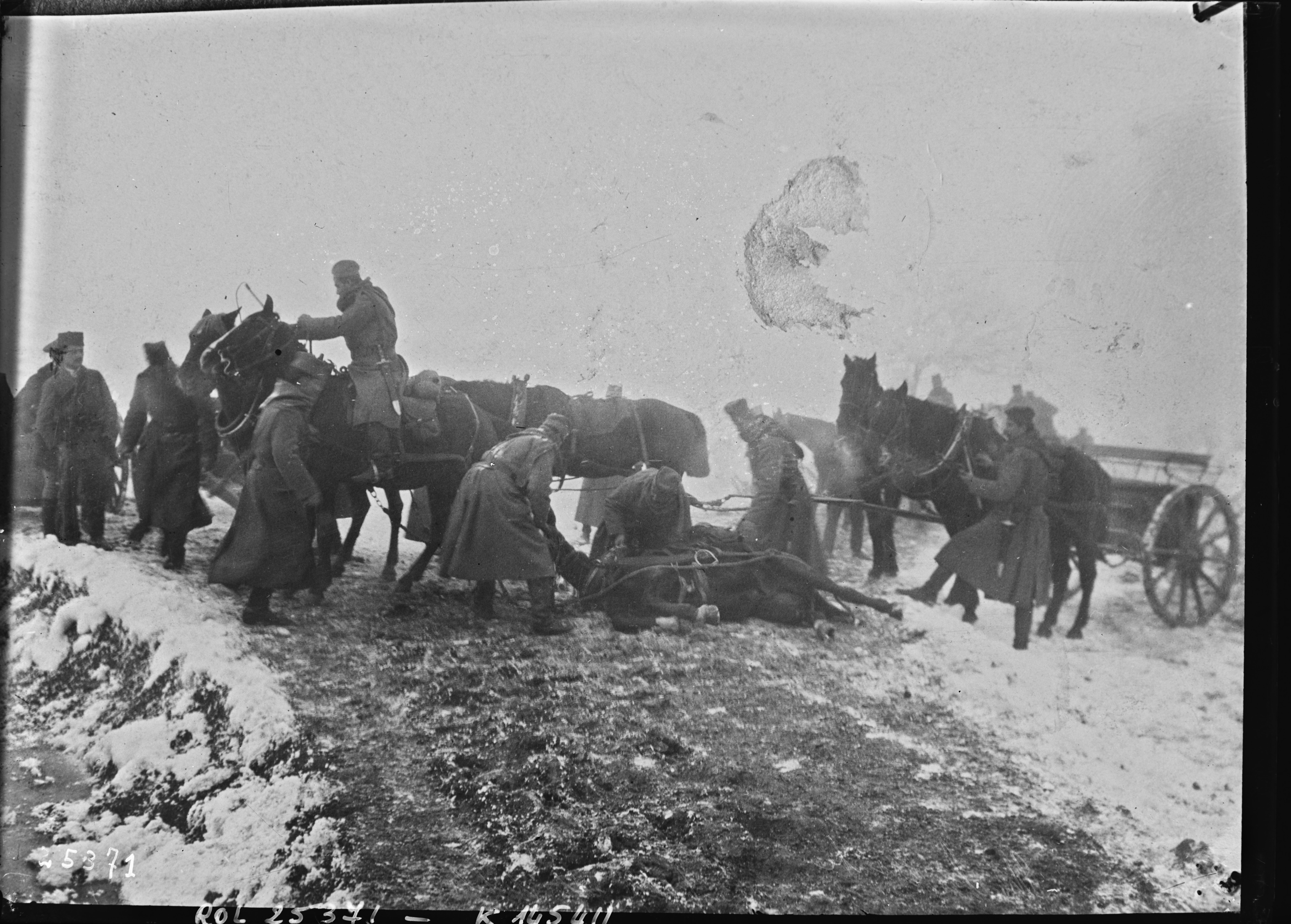
A Serbian horse killed by a bullet is unharnessed in Luma.

Realizing that the initial forces were insufficient to suppress the uprisings in Luma, Has, and Dukagjin, the commander of the Serbian Third Army sent reinforcements totaling four battalions and ordered a rapid intervention to pacify the rebelling areas. As the Supreme Command had not dispatched the requested reinforcements or a detachment from Debar, the Army commander deployed the 11th and 12th Infantry Regiments (two battalions each), along with the 2nd Battalion of the 10th Infantry Regiment attached to the 12th. Two smaller detachments were ordered to assist from the direction of Has, while an infantry detachment advanced from Opolje and Gora. The corresponding operational orders explicitly mandated harsh measures against the rebelling villages.

The Opolje Detachment, consisting of the 1st Battalion of the 19th Infantry Regiment, the 8th Mountain Battery, and 15 cavalrymen, was tasked with assisting the main column by securing the areas east of Mount Koritnik from Albanian insurgents. On 18 November, near the village of Plava, the detachment absorbed two companies previously deployed to Opolje and Gora that had been pushed back from Šištevac. Advancing with combat security, the detachment reached Vranište and camped there. The following day, on 19 November, they engaged enemy forces at the Borje–Globočica ridge. Following a five-hour battle where the 8th Mountain Battery was effectively utilized, the insurgents retreated in disorganized groups. By evening, the detachment had reached Šištevac and Novo Selo.

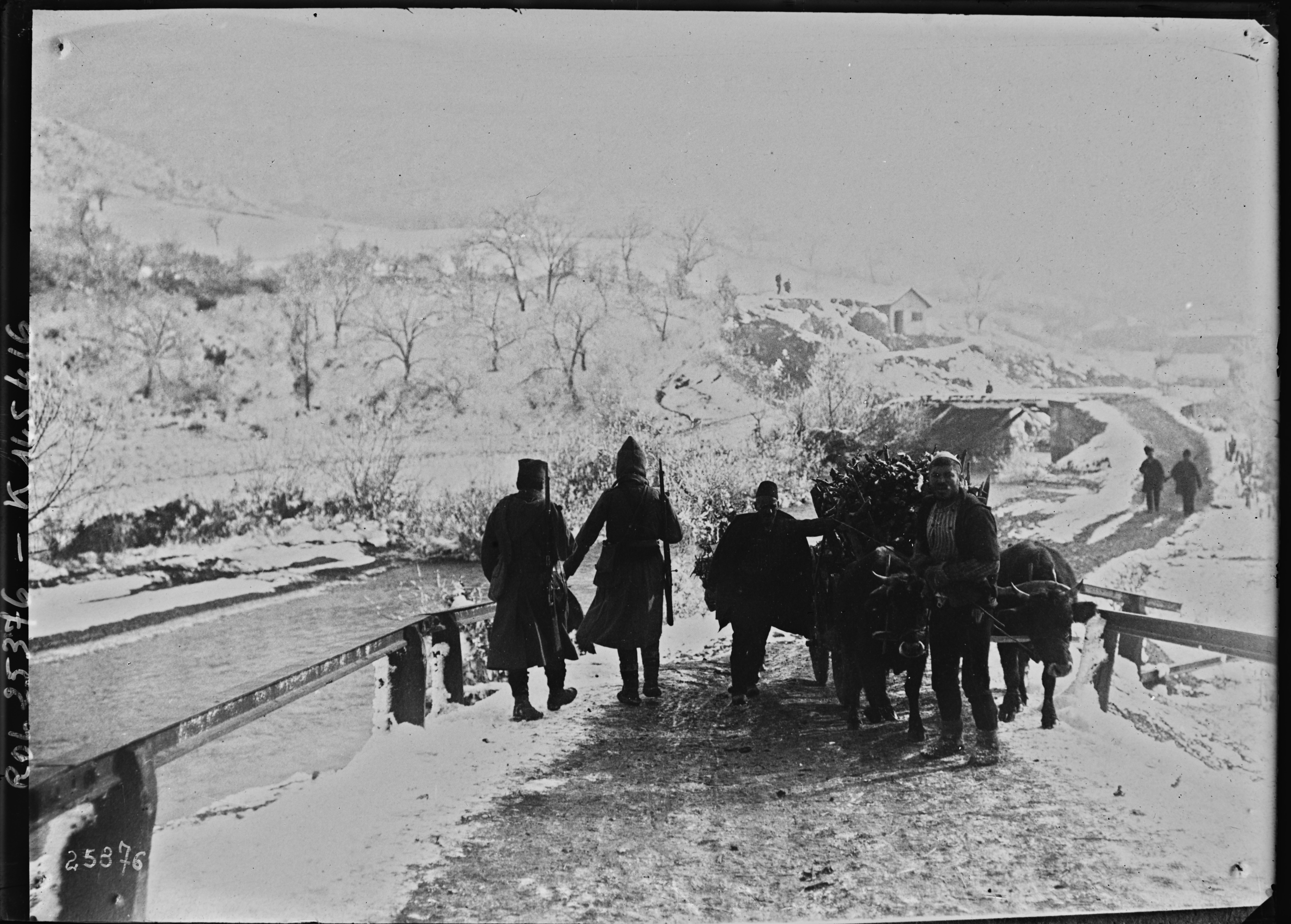
Albanians from Luma on the road to Dibra

Finding itself significantly ahead of the main column on 20 November, the Opolje Detachment halted its advance and secured positions east of Kolovoz. Meanwhile, the main column (11th and 12th Infantry Regiments), under the command of the Šumadija Division I, had already reached the northwestern slopes of Koritnik, west of Morina. Albanian forces held defensive lines southwest of Barloci, anchored between Koritnik and the White Drin. Around noon on 20 November, the vanguard of the 12th Regiment initiated an attack. To establish a tactical link with the Opolje Detachment, two companies of the 11th Regiment were sent along the Koritnik ridge. Subjected to heavy artillery and rifle fire, the Albanian defenders abandoned their positions around 14:00, retreating to the southwestern slopes of Koritnik to mount a new defense. This attempt was thwarted by a swift assault from the first echelon of the 12th Regiment. The insurgents retreated in disarray towards Podbreg and the Vizier Bridge. The 12th Regiment pursued them to the Luma river, holding the right bank while setting outposts on the left, whereas the 11th Regiment halted at Gjeđeni. Albanian historians note that from mid-November, as massive reinforcements from the Serbian Third Army poured into Luma, the self-organized Albanian forces were compelled to retreat towards the banks of the White Drin and Mount Koritnik. Acknowledging the clear military superiority of the advancing Serbian troops, local resistance ultimately collapsed after bloody engagements around the Vizier Bridge and Lumë kulla. Concurrently, two smaller detachments dispatched from Gjakova advanced through the Has region without encountering resistance, effectively securing the route to Lumë kulla and the Vizier Bridge. (Note: During these tactical operations, diplomatic tensions escalated in what became known as the Prohaska Affair. Serbian authorities blamed the Austro-Hungarian consul in Prizren, Oskar Prochaska, for clandestine activities aimed at instigating the local population to armed resistance by promising them Austro-Hungarian assistance. This diplomatic maneuvering, however, did not halt the military advance.)

On 21 November, following the clearing of the terrain towards Lumë kulla, the main elements of the Šumadija Division I were consolidated to form the "Luma Detachment." Tasked with advancing south towards the Velešnica river along both banks of the Black Drin, the detachment split into two columns. The right column crossed the Vizier Bridge, while the left column secured positions near Nan. Concurrently, the Opolje Detachment relocated to a ridge southeast of Topojan. Over the following days, the severe winter weather and heavy snowfall severely impacted both sides. On 23 and 24 November, Serbian forces continued their methodical advance through the rugged terrain, securing villages such as Suraj, Ujëmisht, and Buzmale, while outflanking insurgent positions.

The harsh conditions and the continuous military pressure led to a rapid demoralization among the Albanian insurgents, who began sending negotiators offering to surrender in exchange for the safe return of their families from mountain shelters. The Third Army commander rejected negotiations, ordering a resolute push towards Veleš and Radomir to force a capitulation. On 26 November, reinforced by the arrival of the 5th Supernumerary Infantry Regiment in Prizren, the 19th Infantry Regiment was dispatched to Luma. By 30 November, both the Luma and Opolje detachments reached the right bank of the Velešnica river, the epicenter of the rebellion. After systematic disarmament operations, the Serbian forces reached the Grama river on 6 December, linking up with the Morava Brigade I advancing from Debar. Completely encircled, the remaining insurgents laid down their weapons. By 5–6 December, the resistance in Luma was officially suppressed, though this was achieved at the price of completely destroying the villages from Feta to Spas, all of which had offered armed resistance.

== Massacres ==
The Serbian occupation of Luma established in December 1912 allowed the Serbian Third Army to solidify its control over northern Albania. A military administration was established with its headquarters in Bicaj, operating from 1912 until the Serbian army's retreat in 1916. The administration was subsequently re-established in October 1918. (Note: Following the Allied offensive, when the Serbian army re-occupied the territory and placed the Luma circuit (consisting of 10 municipalities and over 10,000 inhabitants) back under harsh military supervision.) To ensure lasting control during the initial occupation, hostages were taken from prominent local families and sent to Prizren as a guarantee against further uprisings. The route to the Drač County remained fully secured, fulfilling the primary strategic objective of the Serbian High Command for the Albanian theatre of the war.

The initial military campaign and subsequent pacification of the region in the winter of 1912 were accompanied by severe reprisals and atrocities against the local civilian population, which was documented by contemporary international observers. Austrian publicist Leo Freundlich reported that following the resistance of the Luma tribe—which hindered the Serbian army's march to the Adriatic—Serbian General Božidar Janković ordered troops to proceed with "ruthless severity." This resulted in the complete destruction of 27 villages and the widespread raping and killing of men, women, and children. Furthermore, around 400 Luma men who had voluntarily surrendered were taken to Prizren and executed over several days in groups of 40 to 60, leaving hundreds of corpses unburied in the city's suburbs. The Western press also covered the atrocities; the German newspaper Frankfurter Zeitung wrote that hundreds of unarmed Albanians from Luma were killed in Prizren without any legal process, and that both regular and irregular Serbian troops acted on official orders, with Serbian officials publicly declaring: "We must eradicate the Albanians." Albanian historian Liman Rushiti noted that General Janković issued harsh ultimatums to the Luma population, threatening total bombardment if they did not surrender their leaders and weapons. Rushiti adds that following the initial battles, Serbian forces left no village unpillaged or unburned, and the devastation was so absolute that Serbian military documents and the regional press from December 1912 similarly declared that "Luma no longer exists". British traveler Edith Durham described testimonies from Serbian officers who openly boasted about the "wholesale slaughter" and the annihilation of the Luma tribe during the campaign. Furthermore, influenced by pre-war nationalist propaganda, Serbian forces in Luma presented the local Muslim population with the alternatives of forced conversion to Christianity or death.

Despite the London Conference of December 1912 allocating the Luma region to Albania, the Serbian army did not withdraw. In September 1913, a large-scale grassroots Albanian rebellion against Serbian rule erupted in the Luma district and the surrounding mountains. The suppression of this September uprising was met with the full force of the Serbian army, resulting in unprecedented violence and massive massacres against the Luma population during the autumn of 1913, which historian Mark Levene describes as a "localized genocide." According to Levene, Serbian units utilized "scorched earth" tactics and "systematic butchery" that extended beyond adult men to women, children, and the elderly. Massacres included barricading communities inside their homes or mosques and setting them on fire or shelling them.

Prominent Serbian social democratic writer and politician Dimitrije Tucović, who participated in the Albanian campaign, vehemently condemned the atrocities, denouncing the "Serbian bourgeoisie's policy of conquest" and its brutal methods. He described the sheer scale of the devastation across the region, writing: "Go from Gjakova through the Qafa e Prushit toward Spas i Drinit, or from Prizren through the Drin valley to Luma and further to Petkaj and Puka, or toward Bicaj... everywhere you will find graves and skeletons next to each other." Tucović documented atrocities in the village of Luma in detail. According to his accounts, reserve officers unsuccessfully attempted to resist commands to burn the settlement and execute its inhabitants, despite reporting to their commander that only women and children remained. Tucović described how approximately 500 civilians were killed within two hours, noting that soldiers shot women holding infants and terrified pregnant women, leaving surviving small children next to their deceased mothers.

The indiscriminate slaughter in the Luma tribal area was also reported in the Serbian socialist press at the time and later corroborated by the report of the International Commission on the Balkan Wars. A letter from a Serbian soldier, originally published in the socialist paper Radničke Novine and cited by both Levene and the International Commission, detailed the grim aftermath of the September punitive expeditions: "Luma no longer exists. There is nothing but corpses, dust and ashes. There are villages of 100, 150, 200 houses, where there is no longer a single man, literally not one. We collect them in bodies of forty to fifty, and then we pierce them with bayonets to the last man. Pillage is going on everywhere."

Albanologist Robert Elsie notes that certain tribes effectively perished after these conflicts. The once "large and powerful" Muslim Luma tribe was decimated by Serbian forces during its uprising against Serbian rule in 1913 and later during World War I, implying that the tribe largely ceased to exist and function after these devastations. Citing the "Official Report to the Great Powers" published in December 1913, Elsie details a village-by-village extermination campaign in Luma during these autumn reprisals. The report recorded rampant pillaging, torching of houses, and the slaughter of populations regardless of age or gender across numerous settlements, including Shullan, Dodaj, Kiushtan, Tropojan, Çerem, Krusheva, Bushtricë, Bilush, Çaja, Matranxh, Vasiaj, Palush, Gjabrec, Draç, Gjinaj, Lusna, Kalis, Vila, Ujëmisht, and Surroj. In Brekija alone, over 1,300 men, women, and children were massacred, while the victims in Përbreg exceeded 400. Edith Durham further recorded testimonies from Serbian officers who openly boasted about exterminating the population, noting that in one incident, an officer recounted how his battalion had bayoneted all women and children in part of the tribe, resulting in some 1,400 massacres, explicitly stating their goal was to ensure no Muslim population would survive. The Serbian forces only withdrew from the devastated region in late 1916.

== Bibliography ==
- Banac, Ivo (1988). The National Question in Yugoslavia: Origins, History, Politics. Cornell University Press. ISBN 978-0801494932.
- Bjelajac, Mile (2012). "The Austro-Hungarian Creation of a "Humanitarian" Pretext for the Planned Invasion of Serbia in 1912–1913: Facts and Counter-Facts". Balcanica (43). Institute for Balkan Studies, SASA.
- Csaplár-Degovics, Krisztián (1 January 2014). "The Independence of Albania and the Albanian-Ottoman Relations 1912-1913" (PDF). Library of the Hungarian Academy of Sciences.
- Durham, Edith (1914). The Struggle for Scutari. London: Edward Arnold.
- Elliott, Justin Gregory Hamilton (2017). Albanian Language Management and the Generation of Kosovo Albanian National Identity since 1945 (PhD thesis). University College London.
- Elsie, Robert (2012). A Biographical Dictionary of Albanian History. I.B.Tauris. ISBN 978-1784534011.
- Freundlich, Leo (1913). Albanien's Golgatha. Vienna: J. Roller & Co.
- Hrabak, Bogumil (1969). "Reokupacija Srbske i Crnogorske države arbanaskom večinom stanovništva u jesen 1918, i držanje Arbanasa prema uspostavljenoj vlasti". Gjurmime Albanologjike. 1. Prishtina.
- International Commission to Inquire into the Causes and Conduct of the Balkan Wars; Carnegie Endowment for International Peace. Division of Intercourse and Education (1914). Report of the International Commission to Inquire into the Causes and Conduct of the Balkan War. Washington, D.C. : The Endowment.
- Jagodić, Miloš (2013). Novi krajevi Srbije (1912-1915). Beograd: Filozofski fakultet.
- Levene, Mark (2013). The Crisis of Genocide. Volume I: Devastation. Oxford University Press. ISBN 978-0-19-968303-1.
- Qafleshi, Muharrem. "Balkan Wars and the Albanian issue" (PDF). American Journal of History and Culture. 1 (8).
- Ratković, Borislav (1997). Oslobođenje Kosova i Metohije: 1912. Tetra GM. COBISS.SR-ID 57327372.
- Rushiti, Liman (2003). "Rezistenca e popullit shqiptar kundër pushtuesve serbo-malazezë 1912-1914". Kosova (24–25).
- Tucović, Dimitrije (1914). Srbija i Arbanija: jedan prilog kritici zavojevačke politike srpske buržoazije. Belgrade: Radnička štamparija.
- Karakoç, Ercan; Mete, Ali Serdar, eds. (2024). The Balkan Wars: Ottoman Perspectives. New York: Peter Lang. ISBN 978-1-4331-9663-8.
- Biserko, Sonja (2012). Yugoslavia's Implosion: The Fatal Attraction of Serbian Nationalism (PDF). Oslo / Belgrade: The Norwegian Helsinki Committee. p. 344. ISBN 978-82-91809-01-4.
