= Luma (region) =

Region in northeast Albania and southwest Kosovo; historic Albanian tribe

Luma region (green). Two villages of the Vërrini region in Kosovo and one village of the Gora region in Albania are traditionally associated with Luma only in relation to their historical tribal affiliation (yellow)

Luma (Albanian: Luma or Lumë) is a region that extends itself in northeastern Albania and southwest Kosovo whose territory is synonymous with the historic Albanian tribe (fis) of the same name. It includes the village with the same name, Lumë, which is located in Albania. Luma is surrounded by Has region (north and northwest), Fan and Orosh (west), Reçi and M’Ujë e m’Uja (south west), Upper Reka (south east), Gora (east), Opoja and Vërrini of Prizren (north east). The region itself also includes the small Arrëni tribe in the west and the Morina tribe in the east.

Only a small portion of the region, half of historic Tërthorë bajrak (tribal banner), is situated within the borders of Kosovo, from Prizren city to the border between Kosovo and Albania.

During the Balkan Wars (1912-1913), Serbian military forces attempting to assert their control of the region entered Luma and attacked local inhabitants, killed tribal chieftains, removed livestock belonging to the population and razed villages. The actions resulted in a local uprising by Albanians. Serbian forces retaliated through a scorched earth policy and massacres of the population ranging from the young to elderly, both men and women such as barricading people in mosques and houses and then firing upon or burning them. Following the events, 25,000 people fled to Kosovo and western Macedonia. The events have been described by historian Mark Levene as a "localized genocide".

== Etymology ==
Related to Albanian lyej ‘to lubricate’ and lumë ‘river,’ i. e. a river which lubricates or moistens. Toponym with a formation in -um(ë), cf. Krumë, Lum, Lum-th, Osum.

== History ==
The region is documented first in the 16th century (1571 -1591), as a nahiye of the Sanjak of İpek, whereas in the 17th century it is mentioned by Frang Bardhi as the most eastern frontier of the Roman Catholic Diocese of Sapë.

It is thought that before the 18th century the timar system was replaced by the self-governing system of bajrak. Luma has had 7 bajraks:

1. Bajrak of Rrafsha (the bajraktar was centered in Bicaj),
2. Bajrak of Tejdrina (the bajraktar was centered in Ujëmisht and then in Domaj),
3. Bajrak of Qafa (the bajraktar was centered in Bushtricë),
4. Bajrak of Kalisi (the bajraktar was centered in Zallë-Kalis),
5. Bajrak of Radomira (the bajraktar was centered in Tejs),
6. Bajrak of Çaja (the bajraktar was centered in Fshat),
7. Bajrak of Topojan (the bajraktar was centered in Brekijë).

The last organization of these bajraks was done in 1912 in the battle of Qafa e Kolesjanit, against the Serbian army.

=== Battle of Lumë ===
Leo Freundlich, an Austrian correspondent who was in Luma at the time, reported that General Bozidar Jankovic, ordered his army to commit massacres of the Albanians of Luma resulting in entire villages being burned down with the inhabitants being burned or slaughtered alive: "All in all, twenty-seven villages on Luma territory were burnt to the ground and their inhabitants slain, even the children. It was here that one of the most appalling atrocities of the Serbian war of annihilation was committed against the Albanians. Women and children were tied to bundles of hay and set on fire before the eyes of their husbands and fathers. The women were then barbarously cut to pieces and the children bayoneted." A colleague of Freundlich wrote "It is all so inconceivable, and yet it is true!" Four hundred men from Luma who gave themselves up voluntarily were taken to Prizren and executed day after day in groups of forty to sixty.

== Notable people ==
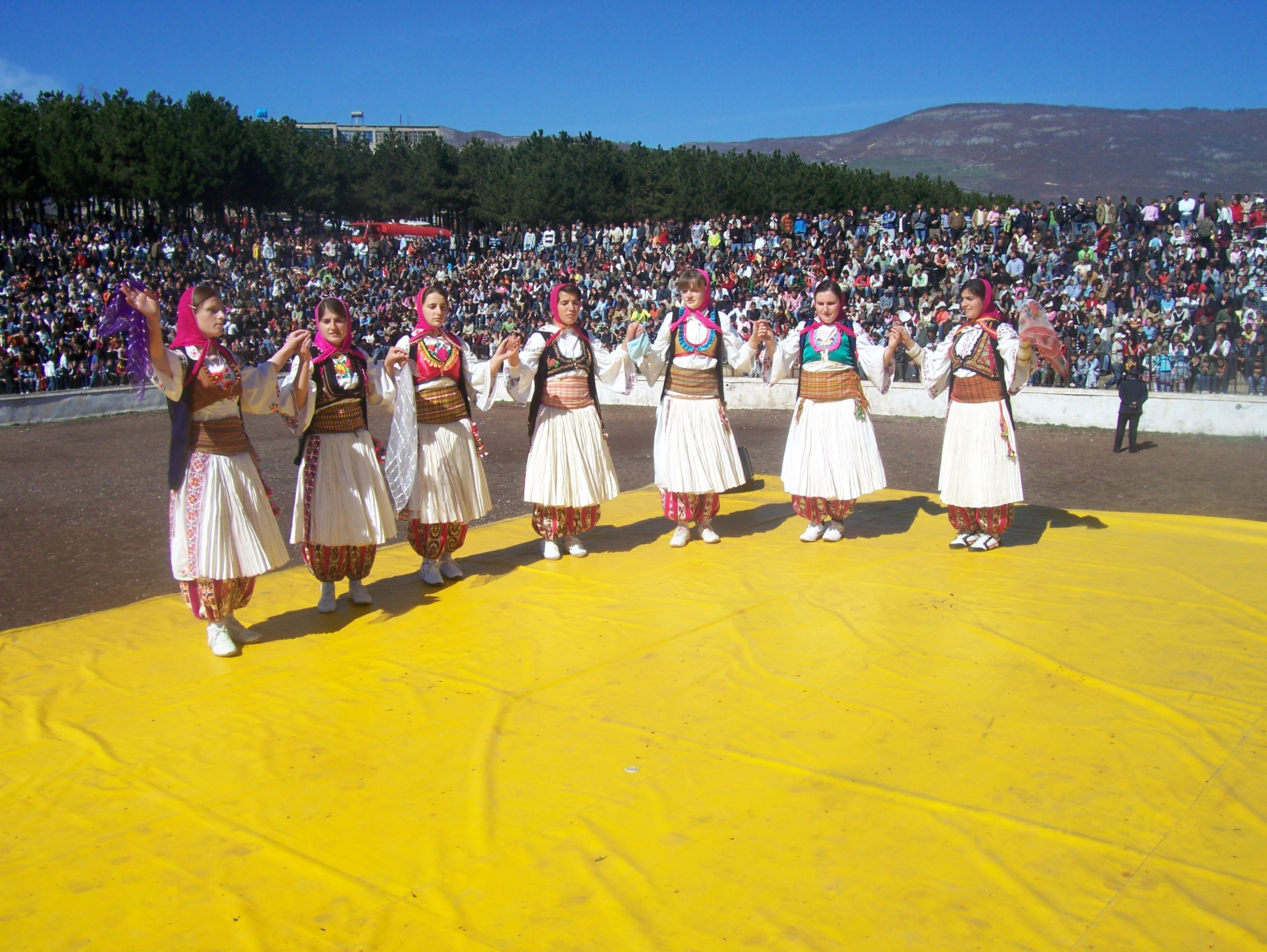
Women from the region of Lumë dancing in a folk festival, with regional traditional clothing

- Baba Hajji Dede Reshat Bardhi - Grandfather of Bektashi Order
- Muharrem Bajraktari (1896 — 1989) - World War II fighter and politician
- Koca Sinan Pasha (1506 – 1596), Ottoman grand vizier, Ottoman military figure, and statesman
- Ditmar Bicaj (1989–), Footballer
