= Kolesjan =

Mountain in Albania

- Mali i Kolesjanit
- Location within Albania

Highest point
- Elevation: 2,047 m (6,716 ft)
- Prominence: 285 m (935 ft)
- Isolation: 5.4 km (3.4 mi)
- Coordinates: 41°56′41″N 20°27′07″E

Geography
- Country: Albania
- Region: Central Mountain Region
- Municipality: Kukës
- Parent range: Korab

Geology
- Rock age(s): Paleozoic, Mesozoic
- Mountain type: mountain
- Rock type(s): shale, limestone

Kolesjan (def. Kolesjani) is a mountain in northeastern Albania, part of the Korab-Koritnik Nature Park. Located south of Gjallica, in the village of the same name, it reaches a height of 2,047 m (6,716 ft) above sea level.

== Geology ==
The mountain is composed predominantly of Paleozoic shale and partially of Mesozoic limestone. Its peak features a mild topography, with slopes gradually increasing in steepness, ultimately forming tectonic ridges in the lower portion of the limestone. The northwestern stretch of the mountain, situated between the westward valley of the Black Drin and the two adjacent branches of the Bushtricë and Bicaj valleys, features substantial deposits of colluvial-proluvial materials, arranged in varying degrees of layers, suggesting a potential fluvio-glacial origin, which effectively sets it apart from its surrounding environment.

== See also ==
- List of mountains in Albania
