= Safet Gjici =

Albanian businessman (born 1972)

Mayor of Kukës
- In office 2 August 2019 – 17 June 2023
- Preceded by: Bashkim Shehu
- Succeeded by: Granit Gjana (acting)

Council chairman of Kukës County
- In office 26 March 2014 – 20 June 2015
- Preceded by: Ram Hoxha
- Succeeded by: Liman Morina

President of FK Kukësi
- Incumbent
- Assumed office 16 June 2012
- Preceded by: Selman Spahiu

Personal details
- Born: 30 April 1972 (age 54) Kukës, Albania
- Party: Socialist Party
- Education: University of Tirana
- Occupation: Businessman; Football administrator Politician

Safet Gjici (born 30 April 1972) is an Albanian businessman who is the CEO of EuroGjici Security and Kevin Construction. He is also the president of the football club FK Kukësi. He was the Socialist Party candidate in the municipality of Kamëz in the 2015 local elections, but he lost to the Democratic Party candidate Xhelal Mziu. He was then elected in the 2019 Kukës mayoral election, which he won.

Gjici later resigned on 17 June 2023 over a sex tape scandal in which he was shown receiving oral sex in his office. He was arrested two days later by Albanian police.
