= Muharrem Bajraktari =

Albanian guerrilla fighter and politician (1896–1989)

Muharrem Nezir Bajraktari
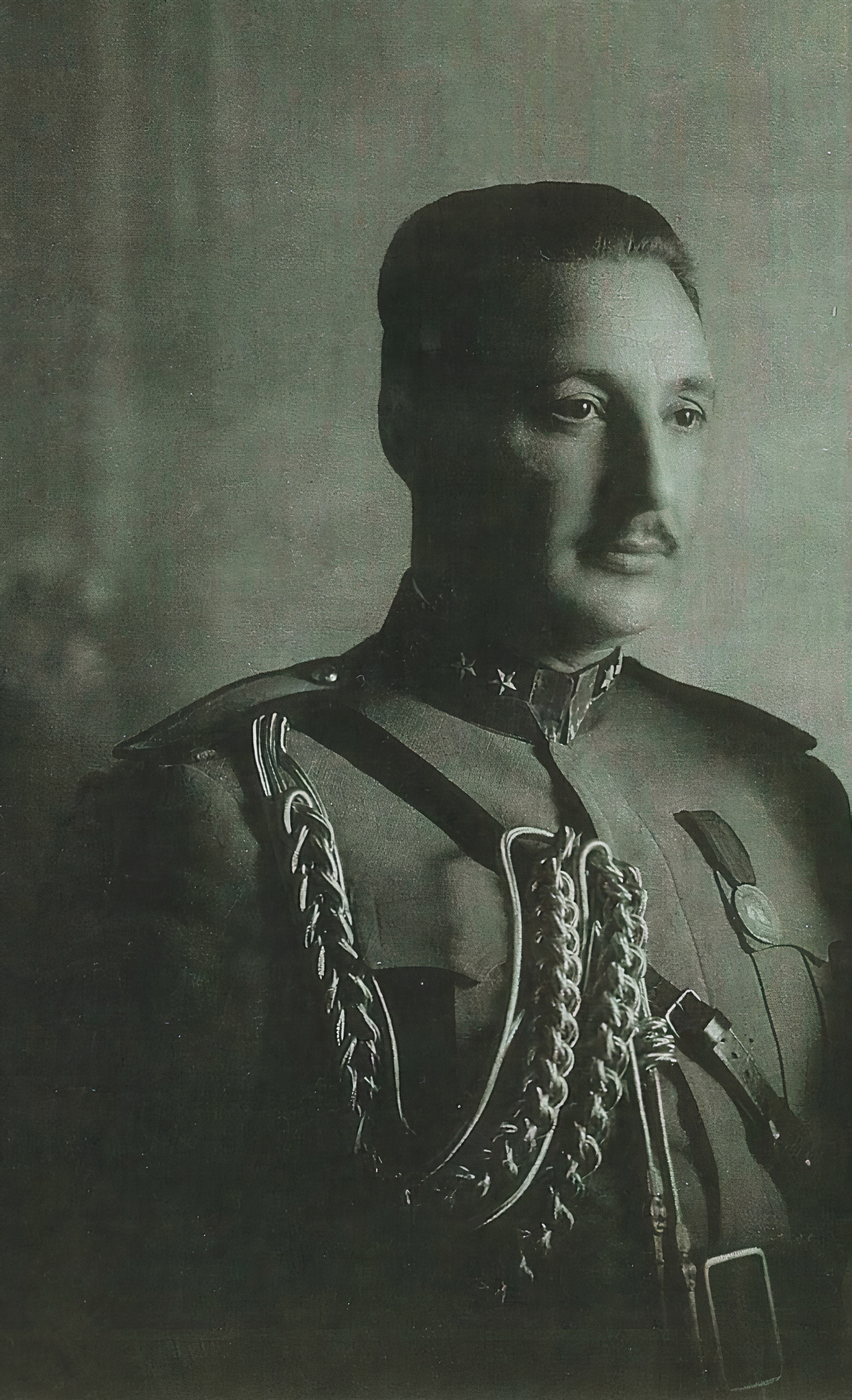
- Born: 15 May 1896; Ujëmisht, Ottoman Empire (modern Albania)
- Died: 21 January 1989 (aged 92); Brussels, Belgium
- Relatives: Nezir Bajraktari (Father), Bajram Bajraktari (Brother)
- Military career
- Rank: Colonel
- Conflicts: World War II

Muharrem Bajraktari (15 May 1896 – 21 January 1989) was an Albanian guerrilla fighter from Lumë in northern Albania, and a political figure during World War II.

== Family and early life ==
His father was Nezir Bajraktari, and he had a brother, Bajram Bajraktari. He emigrated to Yugoslavia. His surname means “Flag holder” in the Turkish language, presumably his ancestor was the flag bearer of their region. He and his family were Albanians who spoke Albanian in the Gheg dialect and were Muslims.

== Interwar period ==
In December 1924, when Ahmed Zog returned to Albania, he divided the country in four zones, as per the four best military captains: Muharrem Bajraktari of the north-east (Krumë), Fiqri Dine of the north-west (Shkodër), Prenk Pervizi of the centre (Tirana), and Hysni Dema of the south (Vlorë). Bajraktari was dismissed from his commanding position in the gendarmerie because he refused to cooperate with the British-Inspector General. In 1936, Bajraktari had a disagreement with Zog, left Albania and went to Yugoslavia where he met with Draža Mihailović in the summer of 1936.

== World War II ==
At the beginning of the war Bajraktar was one of the leaders of the first Axis resistance actions in Albania. Until the end of 1941 Bajraktari led large bands whose number and membership continually grew.

Following the British strategy of establishing a Balkan Union, Draža Mihailović, a leader of the Yugoslav royalist resistance movement, established cooperation with Bajraktari and his forces in Albania. Mihailović already knew Bajraktari from the period when he lived in Yugoslavia for several years before World War II as a political emigrant. It is possible that the British S.O.E. worked through him. According to one report he was opposed to the Kosovo Defense Committee and their methods and had good relations with Prek Cali. Frequent meetings between Bajraktari's and Mihailovic's men were organized at the beginning of January.

Together with other elements of Balli Kombetar, Bajraktari controlled the area south of the Pukë-Kukes line at the end of World War II and secured the retreat of the German army in autumn 1944.

After the war, Bajraktari, together with Fiqri Dine, worked for the Albanian Committee in Paris. He was an executive member of the NCFA (National Committee for a Free Albania).

== See also ==
- Muharrem
