= Kolsh, Kukës =

Kolsh
- Administrative unit
- Location within Albania
- Coordinates: 42°5′N 20°21′E
- Country: Albania
- County: Kukës
- Municipality: Kukës

Population (2023)
  - Administrative unit: 1,058
- Time zone: UTC+1 (CET)
  - Summer (DST): UTC+2 (CEST)
- Postal Code: 8511

Kolsh is a village and a former municipality in Kukës County, Albania. At the 2015 local government reform it became a subdivision of the municipality Kukës. The population at the 2023 census was 1,058.

The municipal unit consists of the following villages:

- Kolsh
- Mamëz
- Myç-Mamëz

== Info ==
The municipal unit borders Fierza Reservoir to the East and to the North, Malzi to the west and Surroj to the south. Common family names in the Kolsh area include: Kurpalaj, Lleshi, Gjocera, Toda, Visha, Çika, Doci, Paci. This zone is rich in water sources, mountains, fields and resources of mineral materials, such as chrome, iron or nickel. Agriculture is one of the most important occupations. The other advantages come from emigrants in the EU.
