= Grykë-Çajë =

- Administrative unit
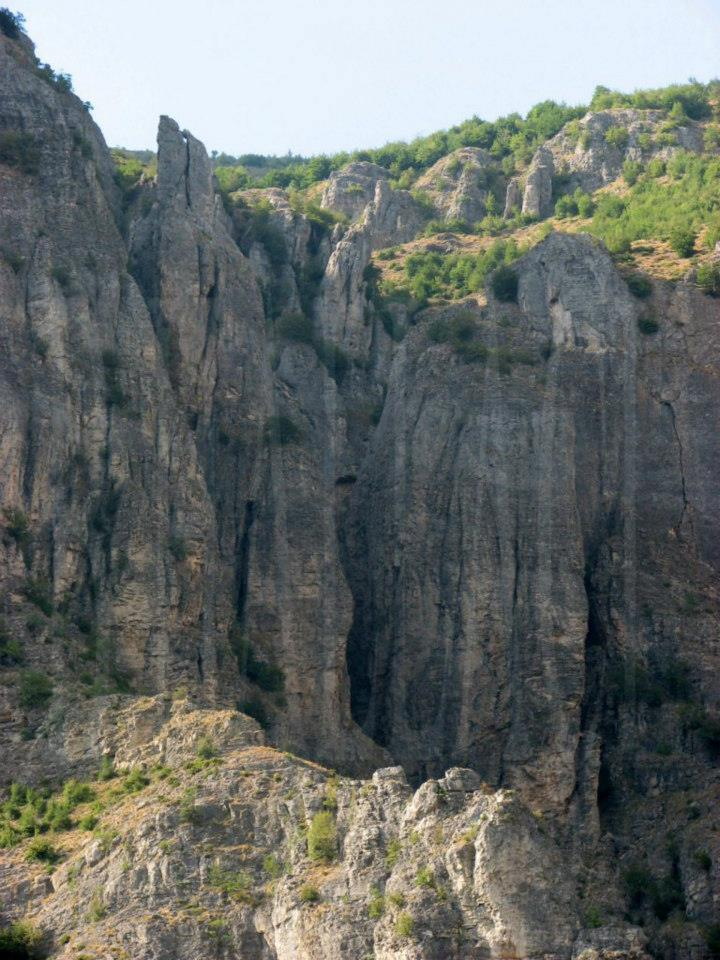
- The Grykë-Çajë canyon

- Location within Albania
- Coordinates: 41°53′N 20°30′E
- Country: Albania
- County: Kukës
- Municipality: Kukës

Population (2023)
  - Administrative unit: 933
- Time zone: UTC+1 (CET)
  - Summer (DST): UTC+2 (CEST)
- Postal Code: 8507

Grykë-Çajë is a former municipality in Kukës County, Albania. At the 2015 local government reform it became a subdivision of the municipality Kukës. The population at the 2023 census was 933. It is located between two rivers that flow into the Black Drin river, at the foot of Mount Korab. Nine Halveti structures lie in the municipality's borders.

The municipal unit consists of the following villages:

- Fshat
- Çajë
- Buzëmadhe
- Shkinak
