= Topojan =

- Administrative unit
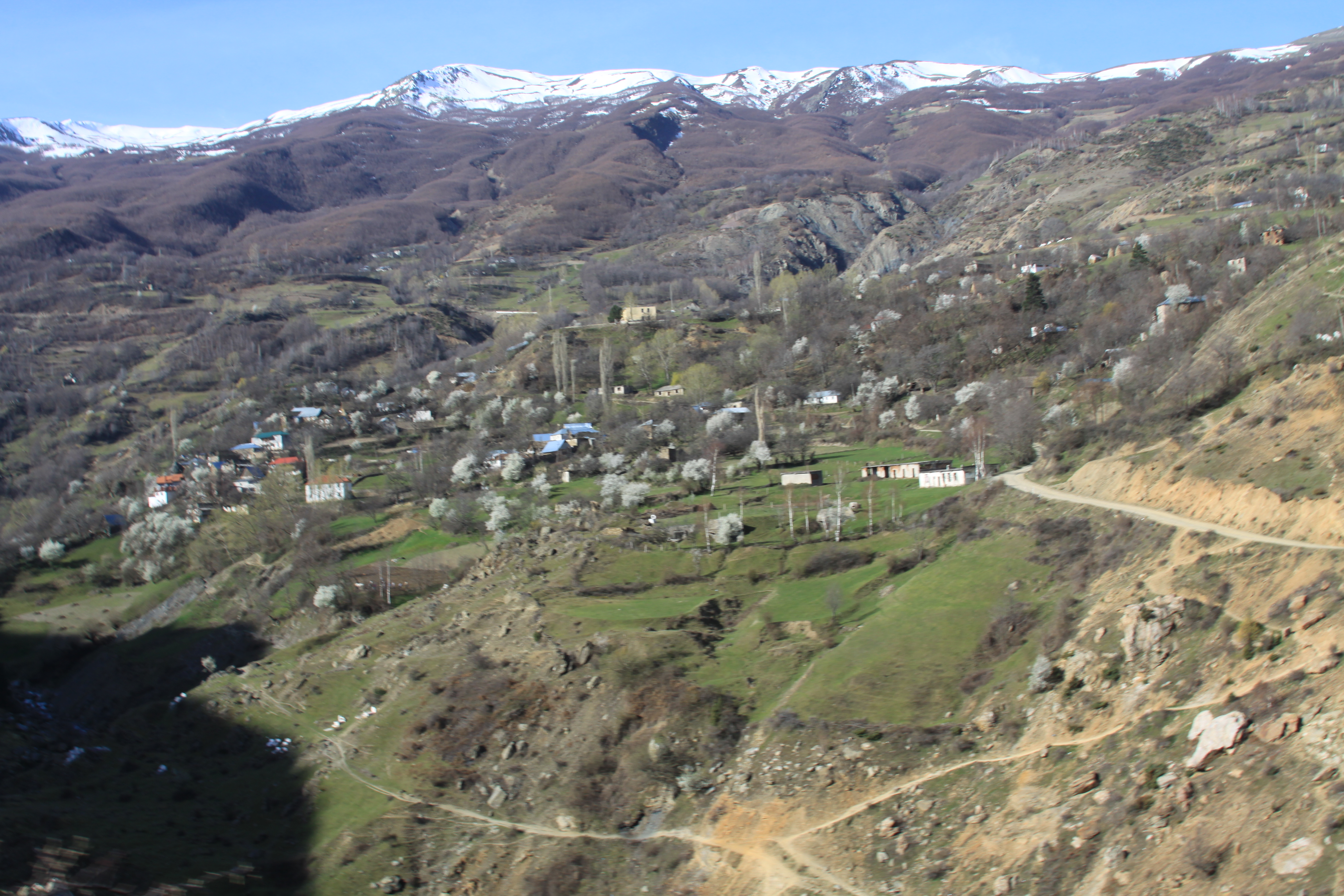

- Location within Albania
- Coordinates: 41°59′N 20°31′E
- Country: Albania
- County: Kukës
- Municipality: Kukës

Population (2023)
  - Administrative unit: 1,062
- Time zone: UTC+1 (CET)
  - Summer (DST): UTC+2 (CEST)
- Postal Code: 8516

Topojan is a village and a former municipality in Kukës County, Albania. It became a subdivision of the municipality Kukës at the 2015 local government reform. The population at the 2023 census was 1,062.

== Notable people ==
- Koca Sinan Pasha (c. 1506–1596), Ottoman Grand Vizier
