= List of mayors of Kukës =

This is a list of mayors of Kukës who have served since the Albanian Declaration of Independence of 1912.

== Mayors (1912–present) ==
No.	Name	Term in office	
1	Shefqet Çela		
2	Abedin Budinaku		
3	Tahir Kolgjini		
4	Xhaferr Bislimi		1944
Executive Committee (1944–1992)
5	Qemal Parllaku	1992	1996
6	Safet Sula	1996	2000
7	Ylber Zeneli	2000	2003
8	Osman Elezi	2003	2007
9	Hasan Halilaj	2007	2015
10	Bashkim Shehu	2015	2019
11	Safet Gjici	2019	2023
–	Granit Gjana (acting)	2023	2023
12	Albert Halilaj	2023	present

== See also ==
- Politics of Albania
