= Tërthore =

- Administrative unit
- Location within Albania
- Coordinates: 42°7′N 20°30′E
- Country: Albania
- County: Kukës
- Municipality: Kukës

Population (2023)
  - Administrative unit: 2,311
- Time zone: UTC+1 (CET)
  - Summer (DST): UTC+2 (CEST)
- Postal Code: 8514

Tërthore is a former municipality in Kukës County, Albania. At the 2015 local government reform it became a subdivision of the municipality Kukës. The population at the 2023 census was 2,311.
