= Ujëmisht =

- Administrative unit
- Location within Albania
- Coordinates: 41°56′N 20°23′E
- Country: Albania
- County: Kukës
- Municipality: Kukës

Population (2023)
  - Administrative unit: 1,136
- Time zone: UTC+1 (CET)
  - Summer (DST): UTC+2 (CEST)
- Postal Code: 8505

Ujëmisht is a village and a former municipality in Kukës County, northeastern Albania. At the 2015 local government reform it became a subdivision of the municipality Kukës. The population at the 2023 census was 1,136.

== Notable people ==
- Baba Hajji Dede Reshat Bardhi (1935–2011), Grandfather of Bektashi Order
- Muharrem Bajraktari (1896–1989), World War II fighter and politician
- Dervish Domi, Founder and President of Atlas Corporation
