= Surroj =

- Administrative unit
- Location within Albania
- Coordinates: 41°59′N 20°21′E
- Country: Albania
- County: Kukës
- Municipality: Kukës

Population (2023)
  - Administrative unit: 579
- Time zone: UTC+1 (CET)
  - Summer (DST): UTC+2 (CEST)
- Postal Code: 8510

Surroj is a village and a former municipality in Kukës County, Albania. After the 2015 local government reform, it became a subdivision of the municipality Kukës. The population at the 2023 census was 579.

The municipal unit consists of the following villages:

- Surroj
- Çinamakë
- Fusharrë
- Aliaj
