= Kalis, Albania =

Kalis
- Administrative unit
- Location within Albania
- Coordinates: 41°50′N 20°24′E
- Country: Albania
- County: Kukës
- Municipality: Kukës

Population (2023)
  - Administrative unit: 252
- Time zone: UTC+1 (CET)
  - Summer (DST): UTC+2 (CEST)
- Postal Code: 8508

Kalis is a village and a former municipality in Kukës County, Albania. At the 2015 local government reform it became a subdivision of the municipality Kukës. The population at the 2023 census was 252.

The municipal unit consists of the following villages:

- Kalis
- Gështenjë
- Kodër-Gështenjë
- Gurr
- Pralish
