= Mark Levene =

British historian

Mark Levene is a historian and emeritus fellow at University of Southampton.

Levene's work and research focuses on genocide, Jewish history and anthropogenic climate change.

His book The Crisis of Genocide: The European Rimlands, 1912–1953 received the biennial Lemkin Award from the New York-based Institute for the Study of Genocide in 2015.

In 2015, Dr. Peter Hilpold, a professor at the University of Innsbruck reviewed the book. He stated that the book makes a valuable contribution, although the study's foundational assumptions are questioned. Levene does not use the same definition of genocide as found in the UN Genocide Convention.

== The Balfour Declaration – a case of mistaken identity ==
In this 1992 essay, Levene followed the people behind the Balfour Declaration which during the First World War gave birth to the British Mandate of Palestine and to what later became the state of Israel.

According to him, historians were perplexed about the reasons behind the declaration, or they were simply getting it wrong. He wrote:

"Barbara Tuchman in all seriousness proposed that 'the English Bible was the most important single factor'."

Levene discovered that an anti-Zionist Jew, Lucien Wolf, had actually proposed the idea to the "then clearly anti-semitic" British Foreign ministry and that it was accepted precisely because of that, with the British believing that supporting the Zionists would bring "World Jewry" and especially the Jews in the United States to side with Britain and actively enter the war against Germany (and the Ottoman Empire who ruled Palestine at the time). Later on, Wolf backed off, and when the declaration was realized, other considerations came into play.

== Works ==
- Levene, Mark (1981). Jewish diplomacy at war and peace : a study of Lucien Wolf, 1914–1919. Unpublished thesis dissertation.
- Levene, Mark (1985). Arthur Koestler. Wolff, London. ISBN 978-0804464123.*Levene, Mark (1999). The Massacre in History. Berghahn Books. ISBN 978-1-57181-934-5.
- Levene, Mark (1993). "Nationalism and Its Alternatives in the International Arena: The Jewish Question at Paris, 1919". Journal of Contemporary History. 28 (3): 511–531.
- Levene, Mark (2005). Genocide in the Age of the Nation State: Volume 1: The Meaning of Genocide. I.B. Tauris. ISBN 978-0-85771-288-2.
- Levene, Mark (2005). Genocide in the Age of the Nation State: The Rise of the West and the Coming of Genocide. Bloomsbury Academic. ISBN 978-1-84511-057-4.
- Levene, Mark (2013). Devastation: Volume I: The European Rimlands 1912–1938. Oxford University Press. ISBN 978-0-19-968303-1.
- Levene, Mark (2013). Annihilation: Volume II: The European Rimlands 1939–1953. Oxford University Press. ISBN 978-0-19-968304-8.
- Levene, Mark (2019). “Harbingers of Jewish and Palestinian Disasters: European Nation-State Building and Its Toxic Legacies, 1912–1948.” In The Holocaust and the Nakba: A New Grammar of Trauma and History, edited by Bashir Bashir and Amos Goldberg, 45–65. New York: Columbia University Press. ISBN 978-0-231-18296-6
