= Kukës =

City in Albania

Kukës Kukësi
- Municipality
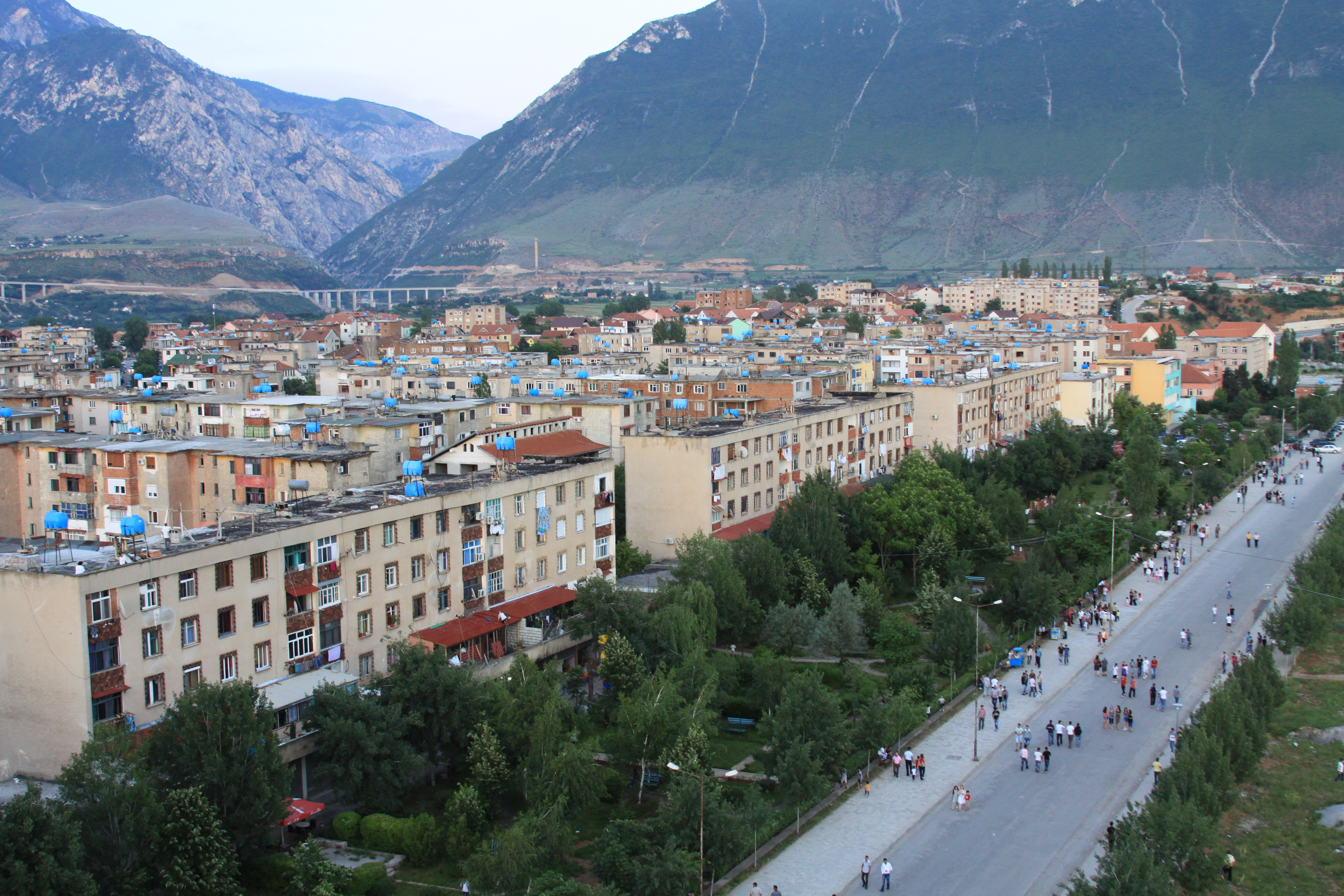
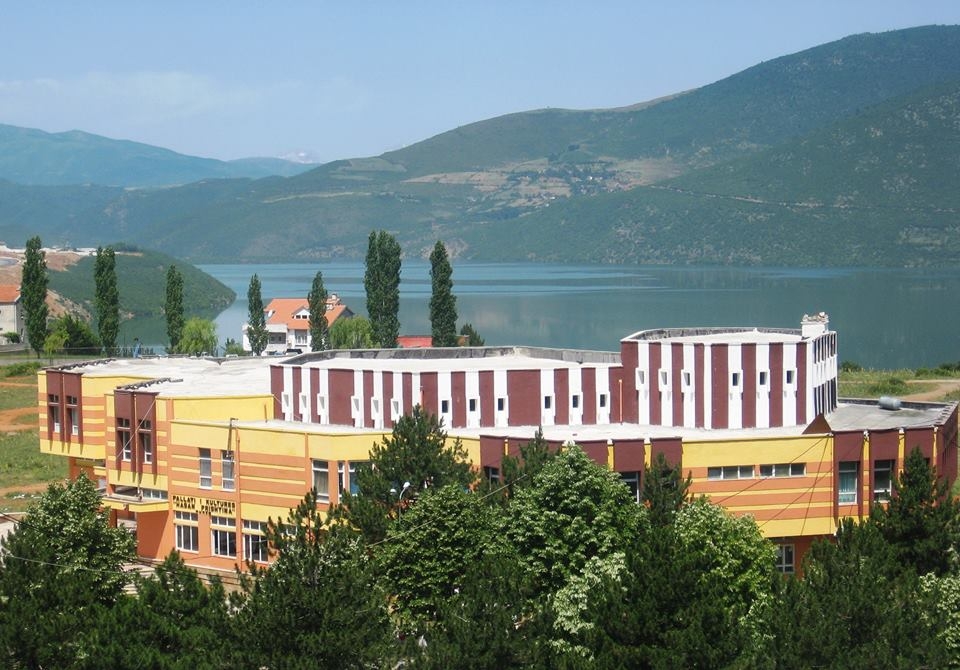
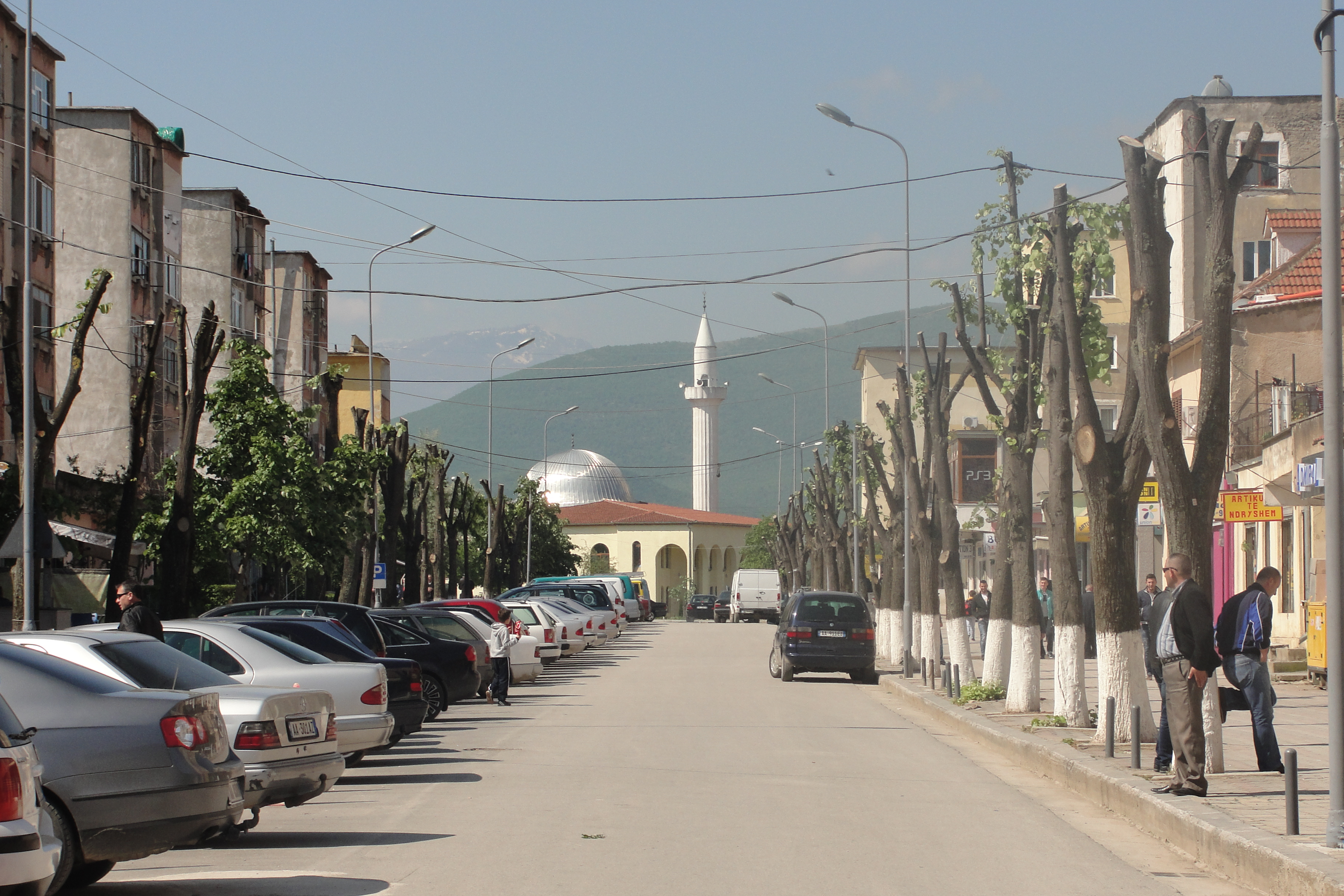
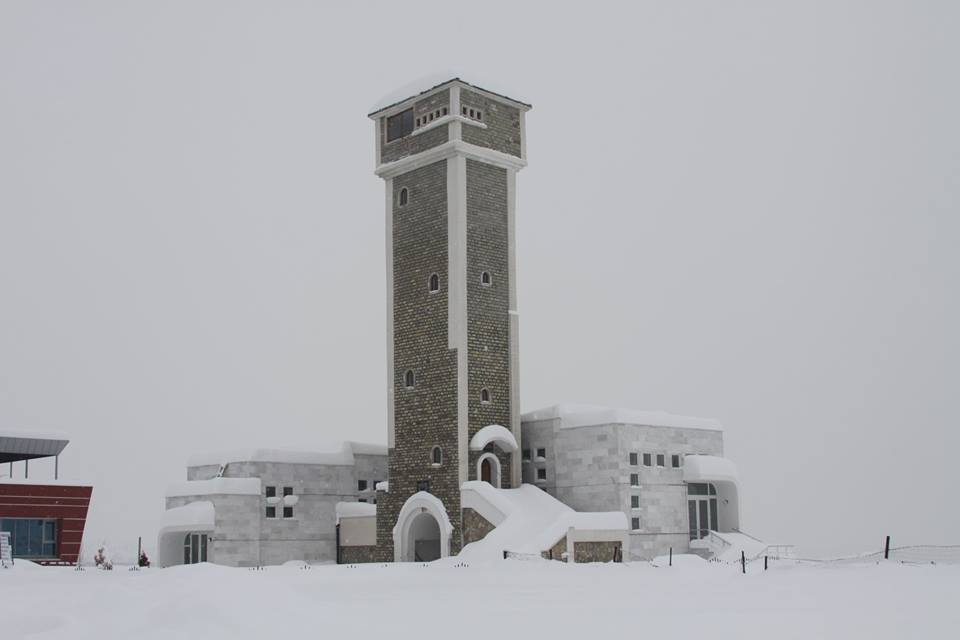
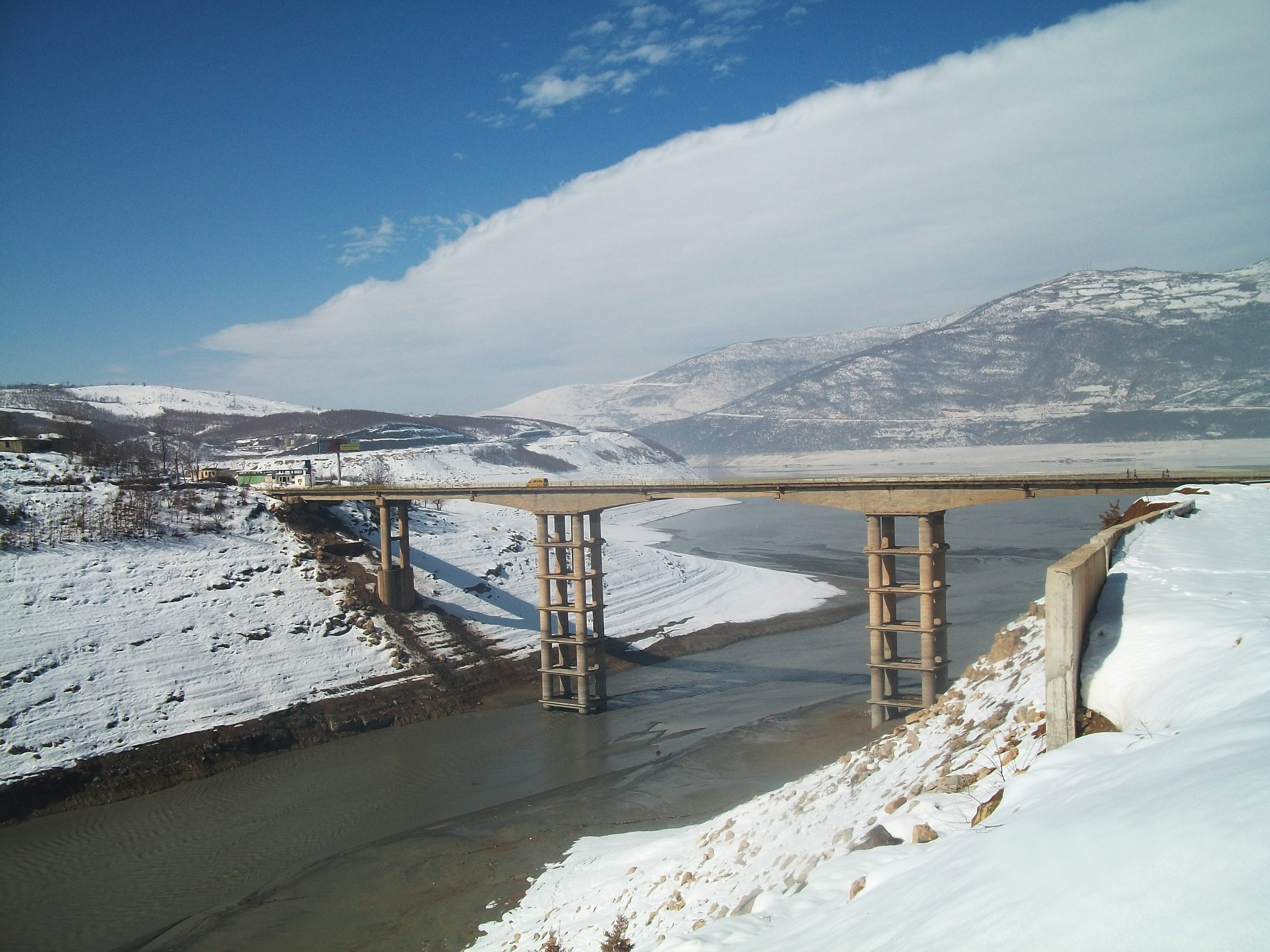
- From the top, View over Kukës, Palace of Culture, Kukës street scene, Ethnographic Museum, Drini Bridge

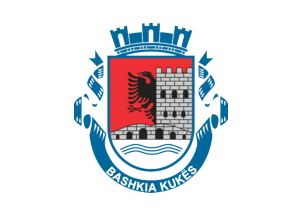
- Flag Emblem

- Location within Albania
- Coordinates: 42°5′N 20°25′E
- Country: Albania
- County: Kukës

Government
  - Mayor: Albert Halilaj (PS)

Area
  - Municipality: 957 km^{2} (369 sq mi)
  - Administrative unit: 8.2 km^{2} (3.2 sq mi)
- Elevation: 350 m (1,150 ft)

Population (2023)
  - Municipality: 36,125
  - Municipality density: 37.7/km^{2} (97.8/sq mi)
  - Administrative unit: 15,643
  - Administrative unit density: 1,900/km^{2} (4,900/sq mi)
- Demonym(s): Albanian: Kuksian (m), Kuksiane (f)
- Time zone: UTC+1 (CET)
  - Summer (DST): UTC+2 (CEST)
- Postal Code: 8501, 8502, 8503
- Area Code: (0)24
- Website: kukesi.gov.al

Kukës (Albanian pronunciation: [ˈkukəs]; Albanian definite form: Kukësi) is a city in Albania. The city is the capital of the surrounding municipality of Kukës and county of Kukës, one of 12 constituent counties of the republic. It spans 8.2 km^{2} (3.2 sq mi) and had a total population of 15,643 people as of 2023.

Historical population
Year	Pop.	±%
1950	1,060	—
1960	3,018	+184.7%
1969	7,300	+141.9%
1979	9,500	+30.1%
1989	16,555	+74.3%
2001	17,157	+3.6%
2011	16,719	−2.6%
2023	15,643	−6.4%

Geologically, the surrounding area is dominated by mountainous and high terrain. The city sprawls across the Luma Plain within the Albanian Alps between the banks of Lake Fierza and the hills of the northernmost Korab Mountains and westernmost Sharr Mountains. At the confluence of the Black and White Drin, the Drin River originates close to the city's territory.

== History ==
=== Early development ===
Kukës traces its history back over a thousand years. The region that nowadays corresponds to the city territory was inhabited by several ancient Illyrian tribes (most predominantly Dardani tribe), as most of Albania. Numerous tombs from the Illyrians have been identified at Këneta and Kolsh nearby the city. The city was part of Kingdom of Dardania during antiquity. The residential estate served as a stopping point on a branch road leading to the Via Egnatia, which connected Dyrrachium on the Adriatic Sea in the west with Constantinople on the Marmara Sea in the east.

Illyrian tombs were found at Këneta and Kolsh nearby Kukës. It was a small Roman settlement, a stopping point on a branch road leading to the Via Egnatia, and a minor Ottoman market centre and trading post on the road to southern Kosovo. It was there (Qafa e Kolosjanit) where Albanian resistance stood up against retreating Serbian army in 1912.

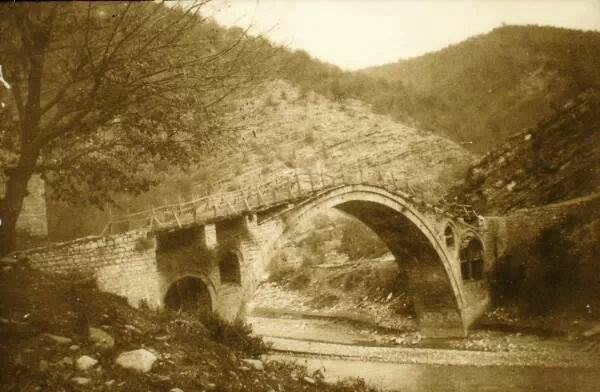
Photo of the old Luma Bridge in 1905

=== Modern development ===
The old Kukës was located at the confluence of the White Drin and Black Drin. In 1976 the town was submerged beneath the Fierza Reservoir, which is held back by a dam. The new town (Kukësi i Ri - "New Kukës") was built in the 1970s in the plateau nearby which is 320m over the sea level. Kukësi i Ri is surrounded by the artificial lake of Fierza and it looks like a peninsula from the above. It is linked with the other parts of the country by three bridges. On the east it faces the snow-covered mountain of Gjallica, 2,468 m (8,097 ft) above sea level.

In modern times and due to the close proximity to Kosovo, the city achieved worldwide recognition during the Kosovo War as thousands of Kosovo-Albanian refugees crossed the border and found shelter and security in the fellow Albanian houses and camps in the city. Kukës attracted international attention during the Kosovo War when 500,000 Kosovo Albanian refugees crossed the frontier and were housed in camps in and around Kukës.

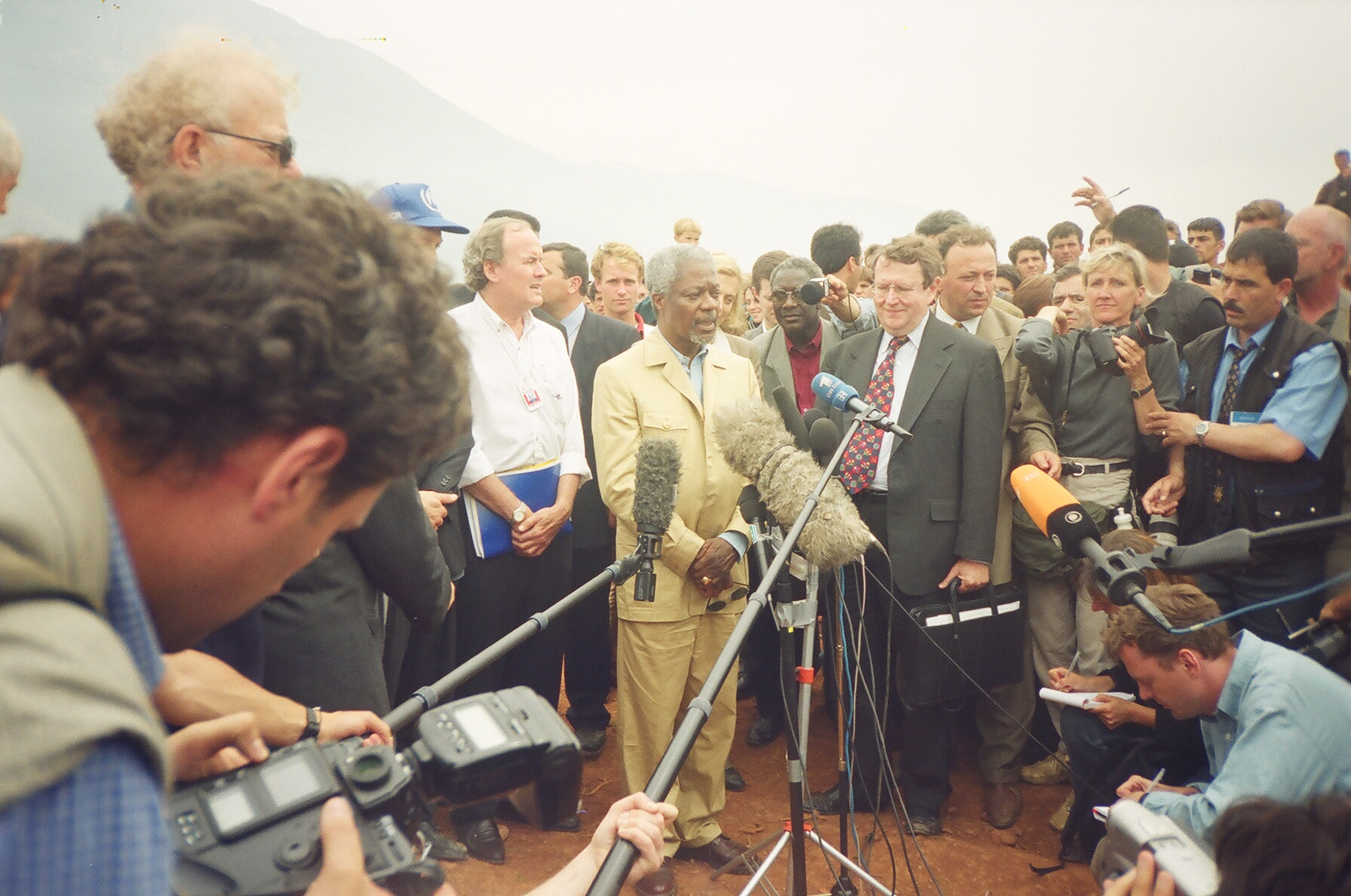
Former UN Secretary General Kofi Annan during the 1999 Kosovo War crisis in Kukës

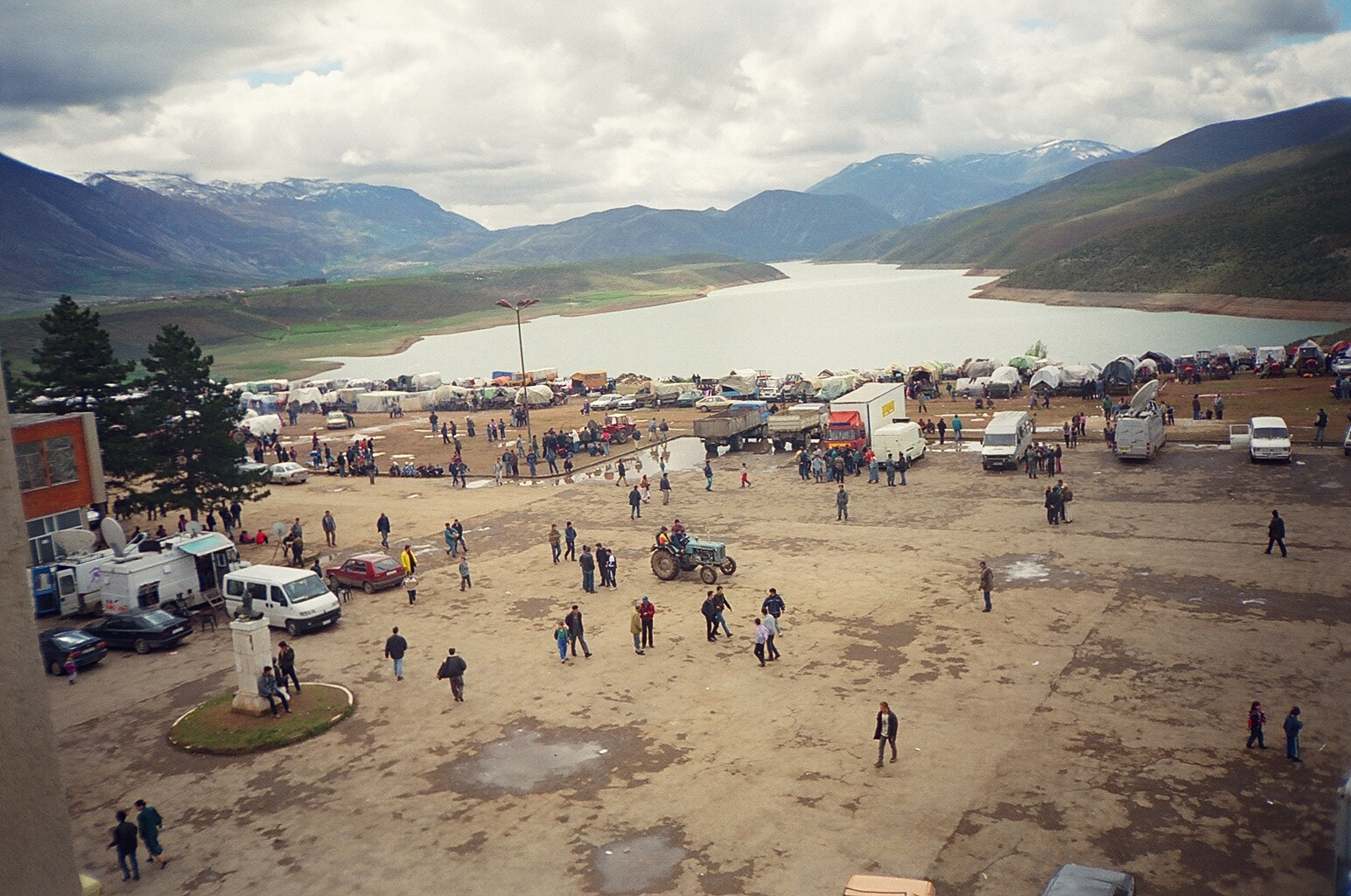
Skenderbej Boulevard in Kukës during the Kosovo Albanians exc

=== Contemporary ===
The city was nominated for the 2000 Nobel Peace Prize in regard to hospitality and for embracing thousands of refugees during the Kosovo War. It was the first time a town was nominated for the prize. In 2017, the city applied for the 2018 European Green Capital Award to become Europe's Green Capital. There is a mosque and a closed alpine-style hotel, part of an attempt to establish a tourist industry there. The OSCE maintained a villa there.

== Geography ==
Kukës is situated in the northeast of the country. It lies mostly between latitudes 42° and 5° N, and longitudes 20° and 25° E. The city lies on the Luma Plain and the southern shores of Lake Fierza. It lies approximately 3 kilometres (1.9 mi) in the southeast of the former location of the city, which was relocated as part of a hydroelectric scheme.

=== Climate ===
Like all East Albanians who are in the plain the zone is humid subtropical (Köppen: Cfa), similar to the north of Italy, due to its interior location but near the Mediterranean. Despite its southern location, its distance to the east compensates for this difference. The city experiences mostly continental climate. This means that the winters are cold and snowy and the summers are predominantly hot. The city's temperature varies a large deal across the seasons with a mild spring in April and May, hot summer months from June to August, frequently rainy and windy autumn months in September and October and very cold winter months, often with snow and frost, from December to March. The mean monthly temperature ranges between −25 °C (−13 °F) in winter and 25 °C (77 °F) in summer. The mean annual precipitation ranges between 900 millimetres (35 inches) and 3,000 millimetres (120 inches) depending on longitude and latitude.

== Politics ==
The Kukës municipality was formed in 1923 by the merger of the former municipalities Arrën, Bicaj, Bushtricë, Grykë-Çajë, Kalis, Kolsh, Kukës, Malzi, Shishtavec, Shtiqën, Surroj, Tërthore, Topojan, Ujëmisht and Zapod, that became municipal units. The municipality spans 934.80 km^{2} (360.93 sq mi) and had a total population of 36,125 people as of 2023.

== Economy ==
After the fall of communism, due to the newly implemented freedom of movement among all Albanians, a significant number of Kukës's population relocated internally or emigrated abroad for better economic opportunities.

The region is well known for their developed agriculture. Kukës has a carpet factory whose products are for domestic and trade use. There is also a copper processing factory as the raw material.

Kukës is a good centre for fishing and walking in the surrounding mountains.

The A1 highway passes through Kukës.

== Sister cities ==
Kukës is twinned with:

- Prizren, Kosovo
- Lyndhurst, United States
- Tetovo, North Macedonia

== See also ==
- List of mayors of Kukës
