= Bicaj =

- Administrative unit
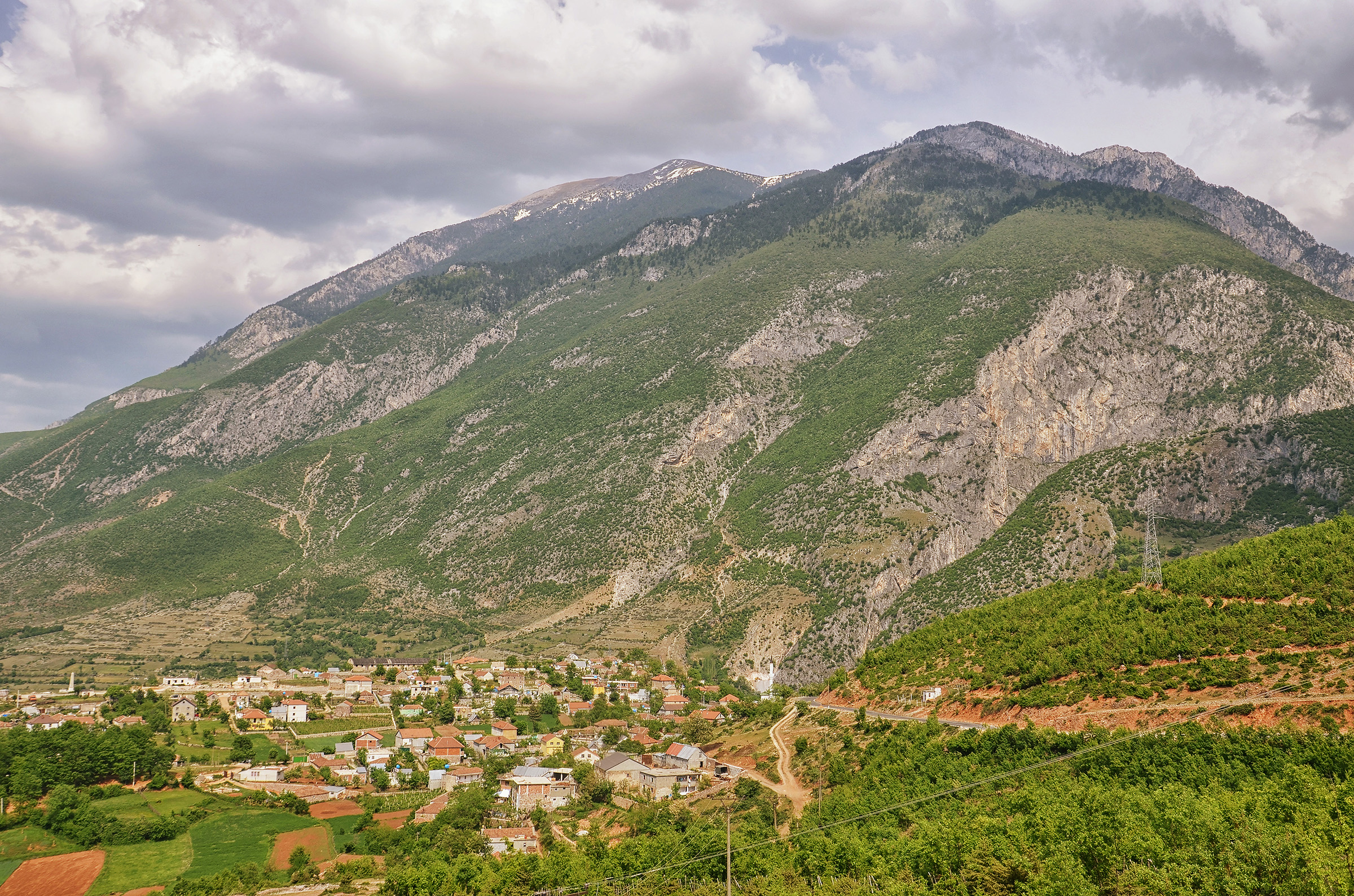
- Bicaj village

- Location within Albania
- Coordinates: 42°0′N 20°25′E
- Country: Albania
- County: Kukës
- Municipality: Kukës

Population (2023)
  - Administrative unit: 4,066
- Time zone: UTC+1 (CET)
  - Summer (DST): UTC+2 (CEST)
- Postal Code: 8504

Bicaj is a village and a former municipality in Kukës County, Albania. At the 2015 local government reform it became a subdivision of the municipality Kukës. The population at the 2023 census was 4,066.

The municipal unit consists of the following villages:

- Bushat
- Bicaj
- Osmane
- Muholë
- Mustafë
- Nangë
- Kolesian
- Domaj
- Gabricë
- Tërshen
