= Kukës County =

County in northern Albania

Kukës County Qarku i Kukësit (Albanian)
- County
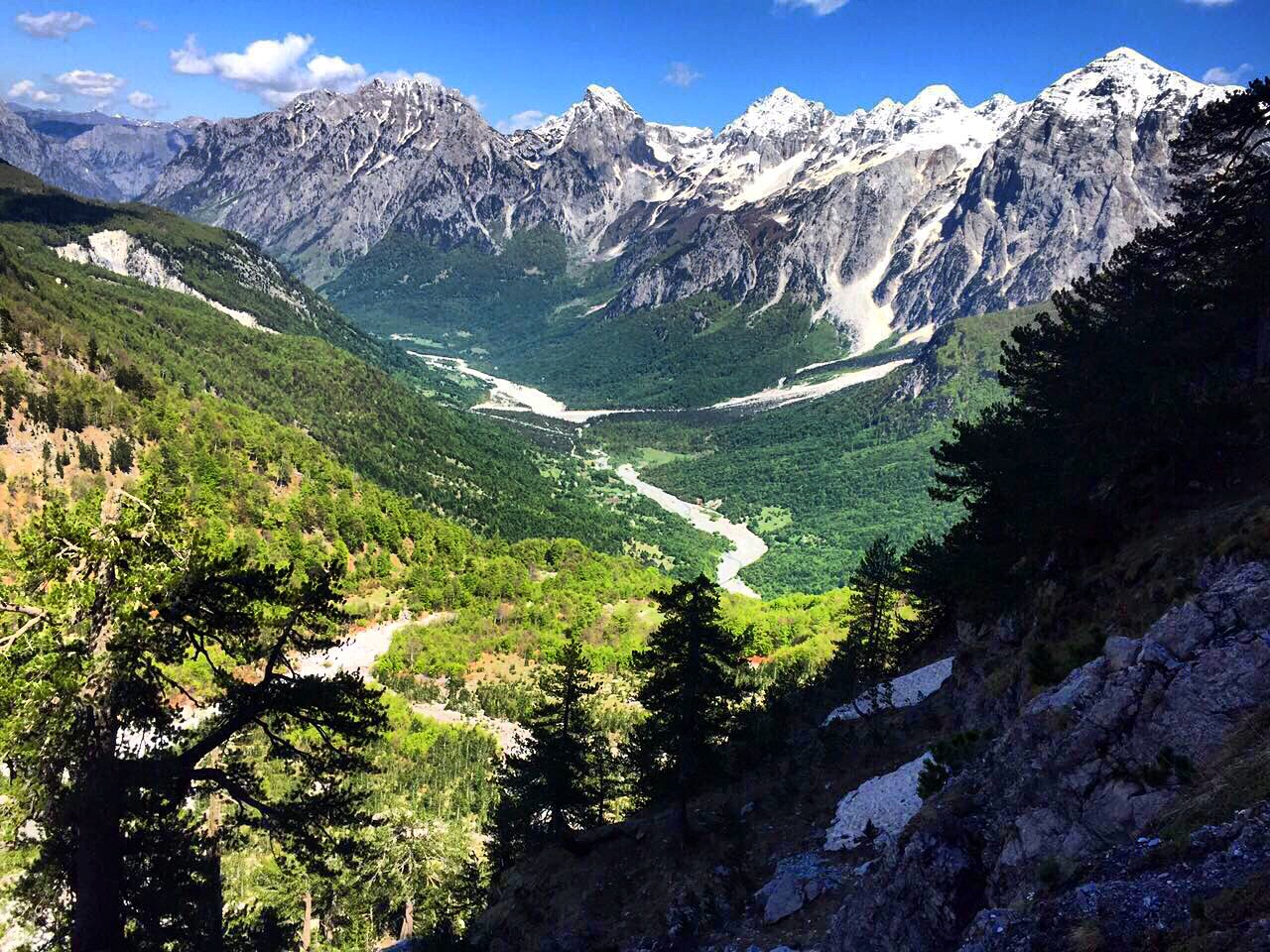
- Valbonë Valley National Park

- Flag Emblem

- Map of Albania with Kukës County highlighted
- Coordinates: 42°10′N 20°20′E
- Country: Albania
- Seat: Kukës
- Subdivisions: 3 municipalities: Has; Kukës; Tropojë

Government
  - Council chairman: Astrit Dobrushi (PAA)

Area
  - Total: 2,374 km^{2} (917 sq mi)
  - Rank: 7th

Population (2023)
  - Total: 61,998
  - Rank: 11th
  - Density: 26.12/km^{2} (67.64/sq mi)
- Time zone: UTC+1 (CET)
  - Summer (DST): UTC+2 (CEST)
- HDI (2023): 0.789 high · 12th
- NUTS Code: AL013
- Website: www.kqk.gov.al

Kukës County (Albanian pronunciation: [kuːkəs]; Albanian: Qarku i Kukësit) is a landlocked county in northeastern Albania, with the capital in Kukës. The county spans 2,374 square kilometres (917 sq mi) and had a total population of 61,998 people as of 2021. The county borders on the counties of Dibër, Lezhë and Shkodër and the countries of Montenegro, Kosovo and North Macedonia. It is divided into three municipalities: Has, Kukës and Tropojë. The municipalities are further subdivided into 290 towns and villages in total.

The human presence in the lands of modern Kukës County can be traced back to the Bronze Ages, when ancient Illyrians, Dardanians and Romans established settlements in the region. Several Illyrian tombs were discovered in the villages of Këneta and Kolsh close to Kukës.

Kukës is predominantly mountainous and framed by mountain ranges including the Albanian Alps in the northwest which is typified by karst topography. The northeast is dominated by the mountains of Gjallica, Koritnik and Pashtrik, while the southeastern bound is mostly formed by the Korab and Sharr Mountains. At 2,694 metres (8,839 ft), Maja Jezercë is the county's highest peak, and the second highest peak of Albania. Karst topography predominates in the county, resulting in specific landforms and hydrology because of the interaction of the karst and the region's watercourses. It is crossed and drained by the Drin river. The county is also home to the sources of rivers such as the Valbona which is part of Tropojë, originates south of Maja Jezercë and Gashi a notable tributary of Valbona.

Located in the north of Albania, the climate is alpine and continental. Mean monthly temperature ranges between 11 °C (52 °F) (in January) and 25 °C (77 °F) (in July). Mean annual precipitation ranges between 900 millimetres (35 inches) and 3,000 millimetres (120 inches) depending on geographic region and prevailing climate type.

According to the last national census from 2011 this county has 85,292 inhabitants. They are mostly Muslim and a significant Catholic Christian minority are present. They speak the Gheg dialect.

== Geography ==
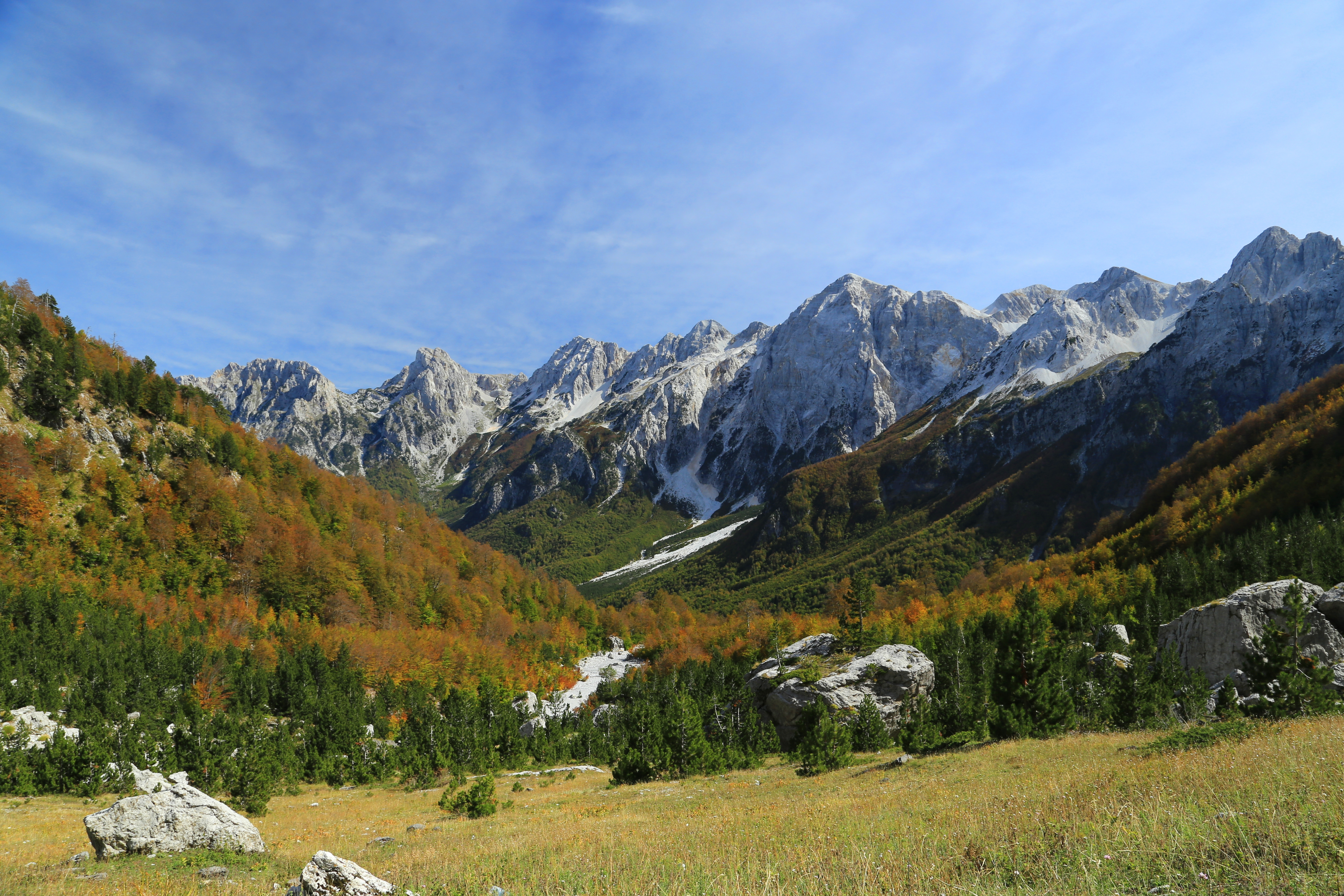
The Valbona Valley during the autumn season.

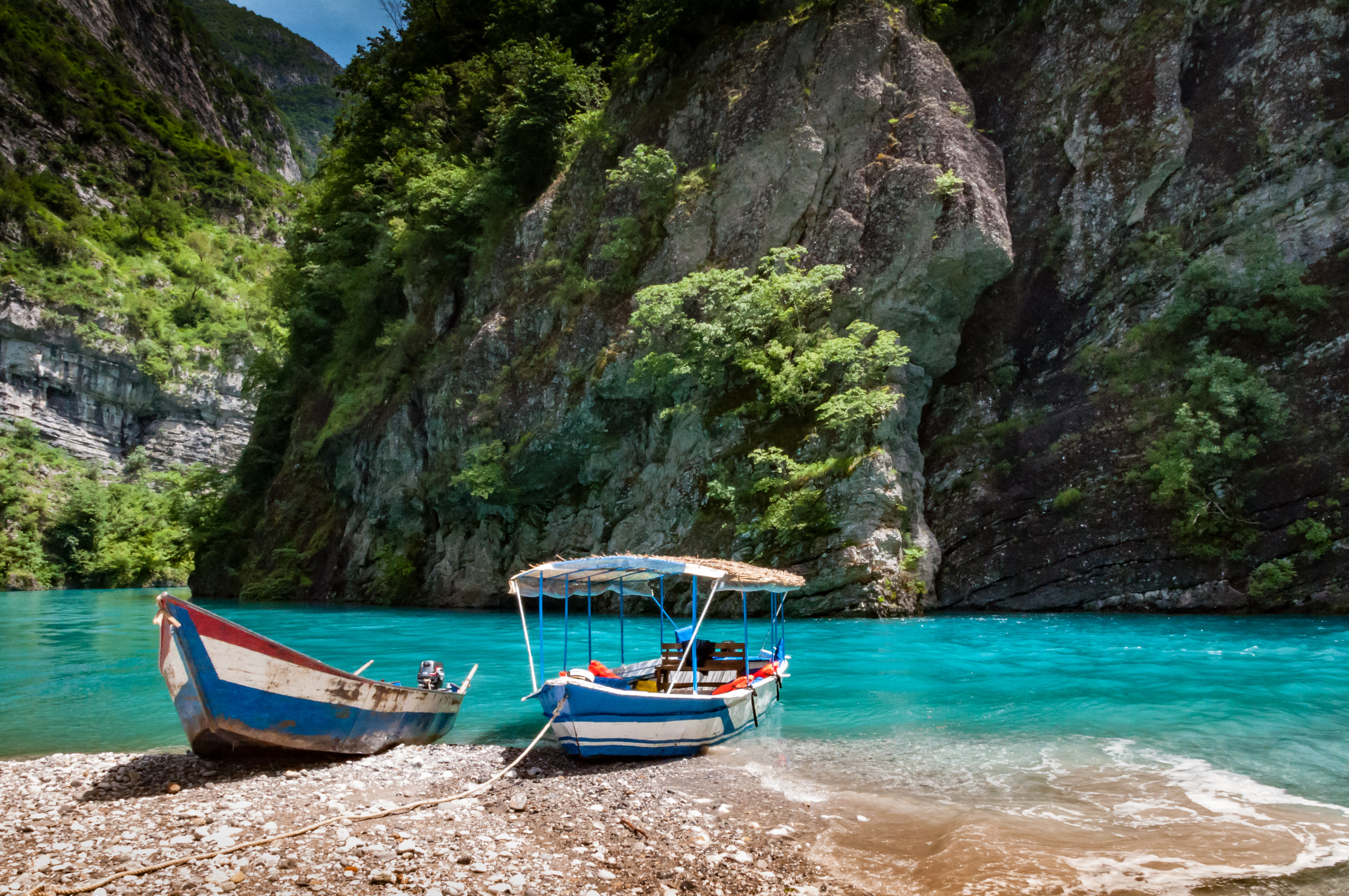
The artificial Lake Koman.

Kukës is one of 12 counties of Albania, located in the north and northeast of the Northern Region. The county area is 2,374 km^{2} (917 sq mi) and the seventh largest county by area in Albania and the third largest in the Northern Region, behind Shkodër County and Dibër County. It is bordered by the counties of Shkodër County in the west, Dibër County in the south, Lezhë County in the southeast, the countries of Kosovo in the east and northeast and Montenegro in the north and northwest. Its northernmost point is Çerem point at 42° 29' 52" northern latitude; the southernmost is Kalis point at 41° 50' 0" northern latitude; the westernmost point is Rrogam at 19° 50' 24" eastern longitude; and the easternmost point is Shishtavec at 20° 36' 0" eastern longitude.

The terrain of the county consists of small plains and high mountains. Elevations here range between 250 m (0.16 mi) and 2,200 m (1.4 mi). The Albanian Alps are a high mountain range running through Tropojë across the northwest of the county. The northeast contain high and steep peaks including Gjallica, Koritnik and Pashtrik. Between these mountains are mostly narrow valleys, canyons and ravines. From southeast, the county is crossed by the Sharr and Korab Mountains.

Hydrologically, the county lies almost entirely within the basin of the Drin and its tributaries. The river flows into the Adriatic Sea after crossing the county territory from the confluence of Black Drin and White Drin. On their way, its basin and zone of influence naturally correspond to the areas destined for agricultural use. Lake Fierza and Koman lies in the county and are fed and drained by rivers Black Drin and White Drin. Other notable rivers include Gashi and Valbona.

Phytogeographically, the county falls within the Dinaric Mountains mixed forests and Balkan mixed forests terrestrial ecoregions of the Palearctic temperate broadleaf and mixed forest. The Balkan mixed forests occupy the eastern portion of the county. Inside the county, there are a national parks, a nature park and a nature reserve, which include the Valbonë Valley National Park, Korab-Koritnik Nature Park and the Gashi River Nature Reserve. The northern and eastern bound of the county forms a part of the European Green Belt, which serves as a retreat for endangered mammal and plant species. Furthermore, the Gashi River was declared a UNESCO World Heritage Site as part of the Primeval beech forests of the Carpathians and other regions of Europe.

== Demographics ==
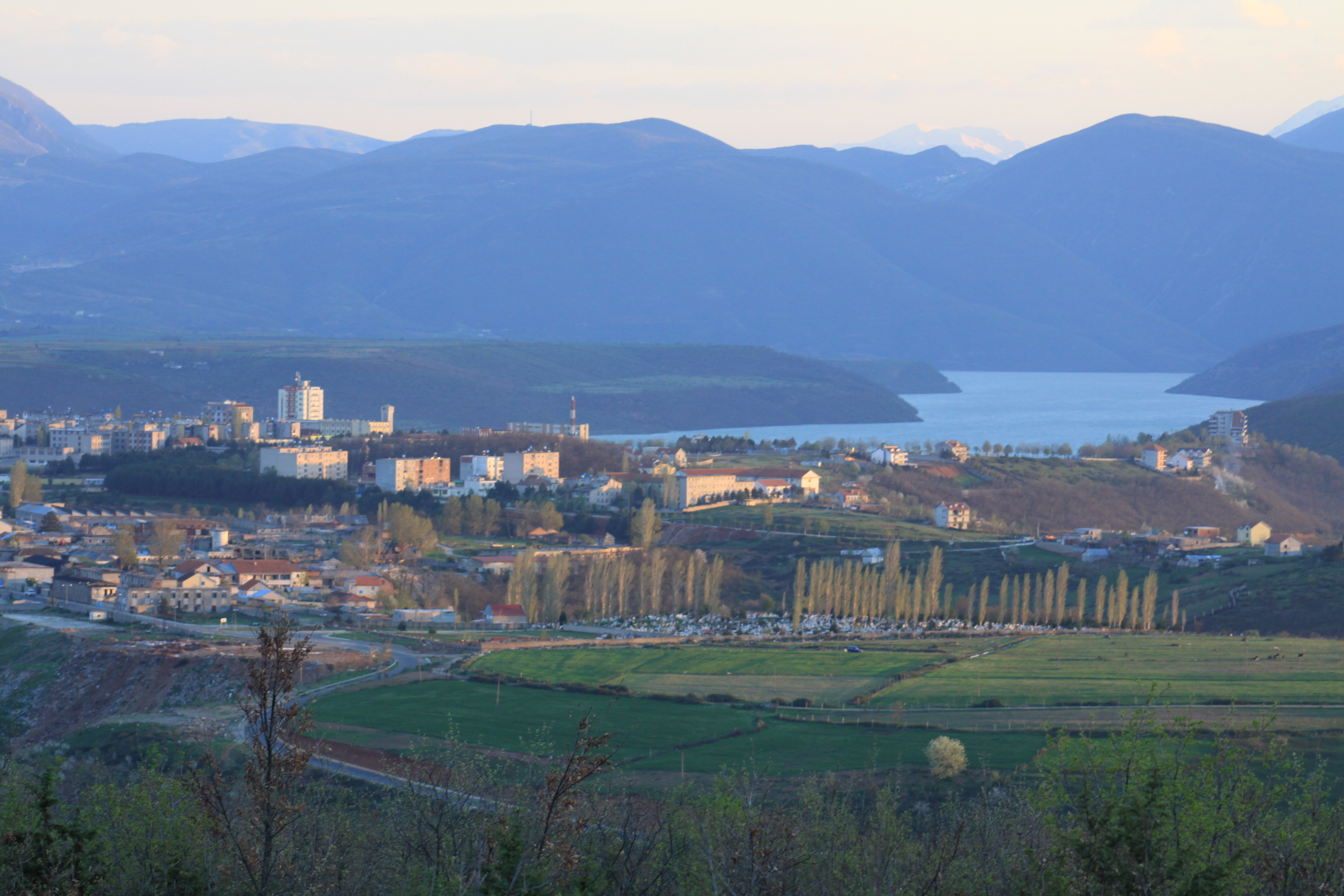
Kukës is the largest city in the county.

Historical population
Year	Pop.	±%
1950	62,150	—
1960	68,136	+9.6%
1969	90,696	+33.1%
1979	114,325	+26.1%
1989	146,081	+27.8%
2001	111,393	−23.7%
2011	85,292	−23.4%
2023	61,998	−27.3%

With a total population of around 61,998 people as of the Albanian census of 2023, Kukës is the second-to-last least populous county in Albania. The population density is 26 inhabitants per square kilometre (67/sq mi). It has now more than halved from its peak population of 146,081 in the 1989 census. Kukës has the highest total fertility rate of Albania with 2.29 children per woman (compared to the national number of 1.54 children per woman).

From the 2023 census, the county is 94.94% Albanian, 3.51% Bulgarian (largely Gorani in Shishtavec), and the remainder belonging to smaller ethnic groups or no declaration.

There has been a surge of tourists ever since the grand opening of Kukës International Airport Zayed in 2021.

=== Religion ===
According to the 2023 census, Kukës had the highest percentage of Muslims in Albania, followed by small Christian communities and a non-religious population. Overall, 88.6% of residents identified with a religion. Between the 2011 and 2023 censuses in Kukës, the religious composition experienced some alterations, with Sunni Muslims maintaining their position as the predominant group. The proportion of Muslims slightly increased from 83.8% to 84.9%. In contrast, the presence of Bektashi Muslims diminished from 0.2% to 0.0%. Catholic Christians saw a marginal rise in their share, moving from 2.6% to 2.9%, while Orthodox Christians also registered a small increase from 0.0% to 0.1%. Evangelical Christians witnessed a modest growth from 0.0% to 0.2%.

Notably, there was a considerable expansion in the segment of the population identifying as irreligious. Atheists saw a slight uptick from 0.3% to 0.4%, and the number of individuals identifying as believers without denomination showed a substantial surge from 2.5% to 5.6%. Conversely, there was a marked decrease in the percentage of individuals who preferred not to answer, falling from 8.2% to 4.4%, and those whose religious affiliation was not stated or available also decreased from 2.5% to 1.0%.

Population of Kukës according to religious group (2011–2023)
Religion group	Census 2011		Census 2023		Difference (2023−2011)	
Religion group	Number	Percentage	Number	Percentage	Number	Percentage
Sunni Muslim	71,483	83.8%	52,647	84.9%	-18,836	+1.1%
Bektashi Muslim	177	0.2%	3	0.0%	-174	-0.2%
Total Muslim	71,660	84.0%	52,650	84.9%	-19,010	+0.9%
Catholic Christian	2,236	2.6%	1,778	2.9%	-458	+0.3%
Orthodox Christian	22	0.0%	47	0.1%	+25	+0.1%
Evangelical	23	0.0%	94	0.2%	+71	+0.2%
Other Christian	31	0.0%	43	0.1%	+12	+0.1%
Total Christian*	2,312	2.7%	1,962	3.2%	-350	+0.5%
Atheists	284	0.3%	252	0.4%	-32	+0.1%
Believers without denomination	2,095	2.5%	3,492	5.6%	+1,397	+3.1%
Total Non-religious	2,379	2.8%	3,744	6.0%	+1,365	+3.2%
Prefer not to answer	6,989	8.2%	2,711	4.4%	-4,278	-3.8%
Not stated / Not available**	2,122	2.5%	615	1.0%	-1,507	-1.5%
TOTAL	85,292	100%	61,998	100%	-23,294	–

== Economy ==
Kukës County is Albania's poorest region both historically and presently. Since the 1990s many of its inhabitants have migrated to Tirana or abroad. Prior to the collapse, Kukës industry was rug making, agriculture and textiles. However, since the 1990s much of Kukës population have migrated abroad, leaving to a decline in the local economy and making Kukës among Albania's and Europe's poorest regions and least developed. However, in 2021, Edi Rama opened up Albania's second international Airport in Kukës to revive the stagnant economy there. Nonetheless, Kukës remains three times poorer than the capital city of Tirana.

== Gallery ==
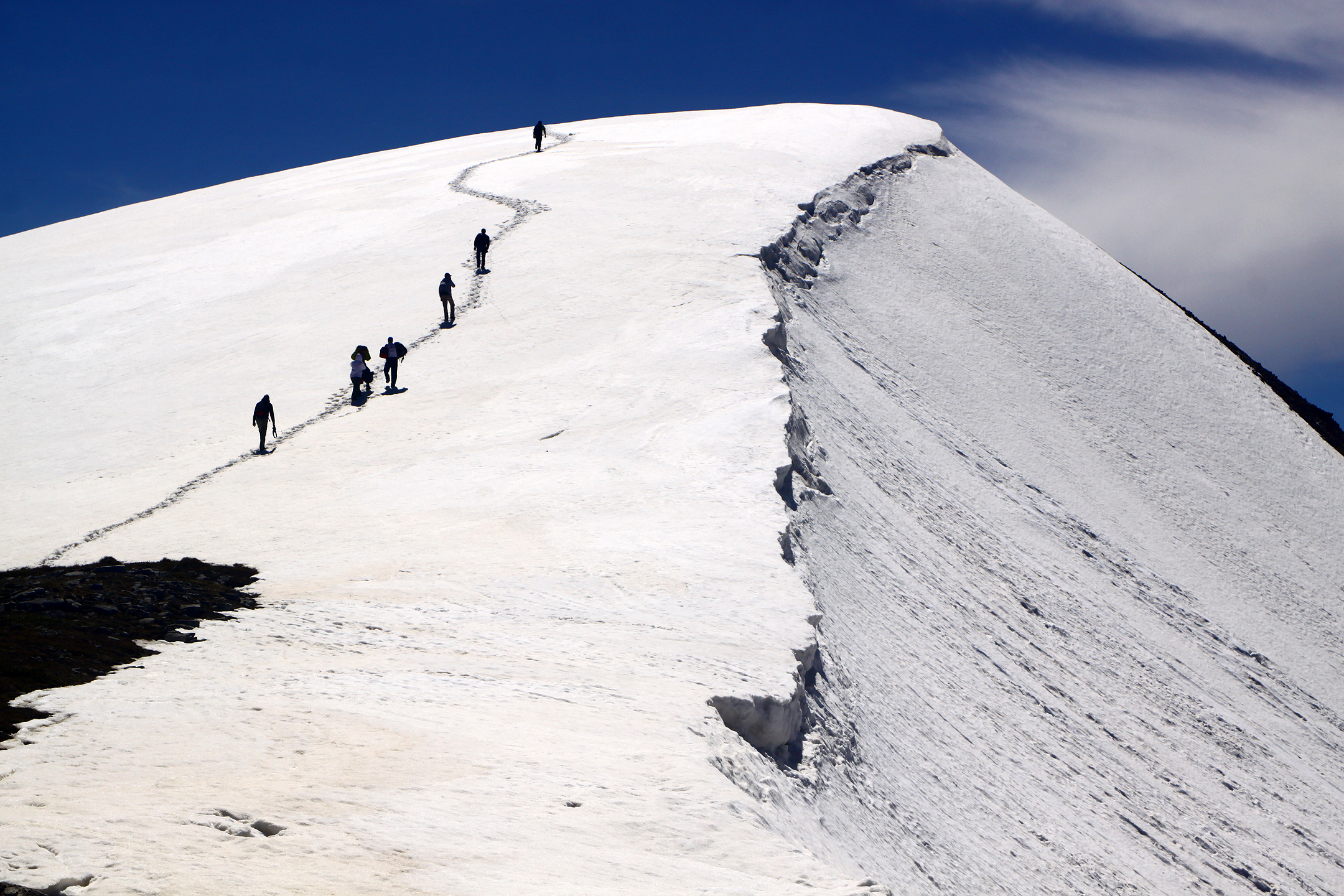
Koritnik

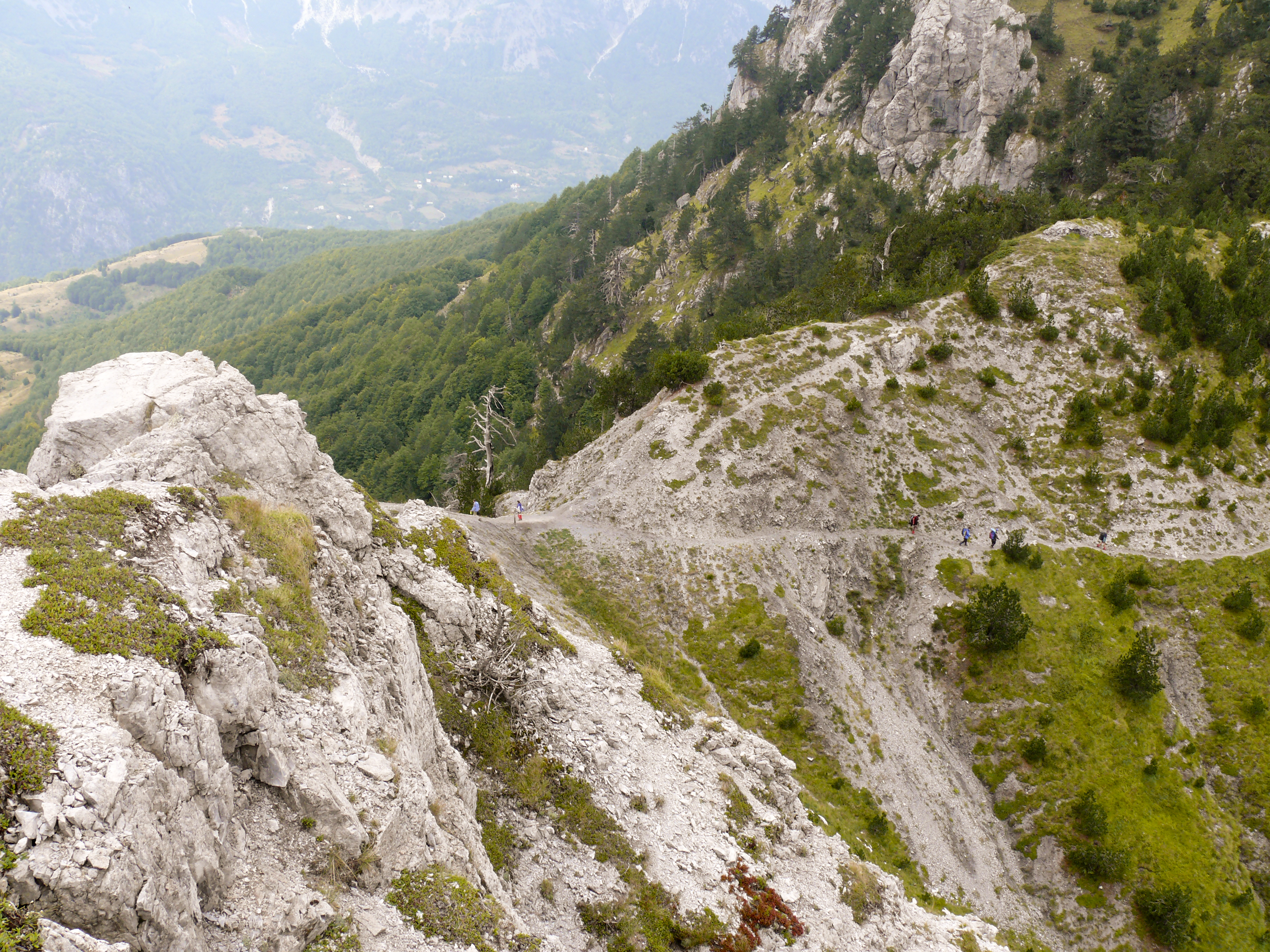
Valbona Pass

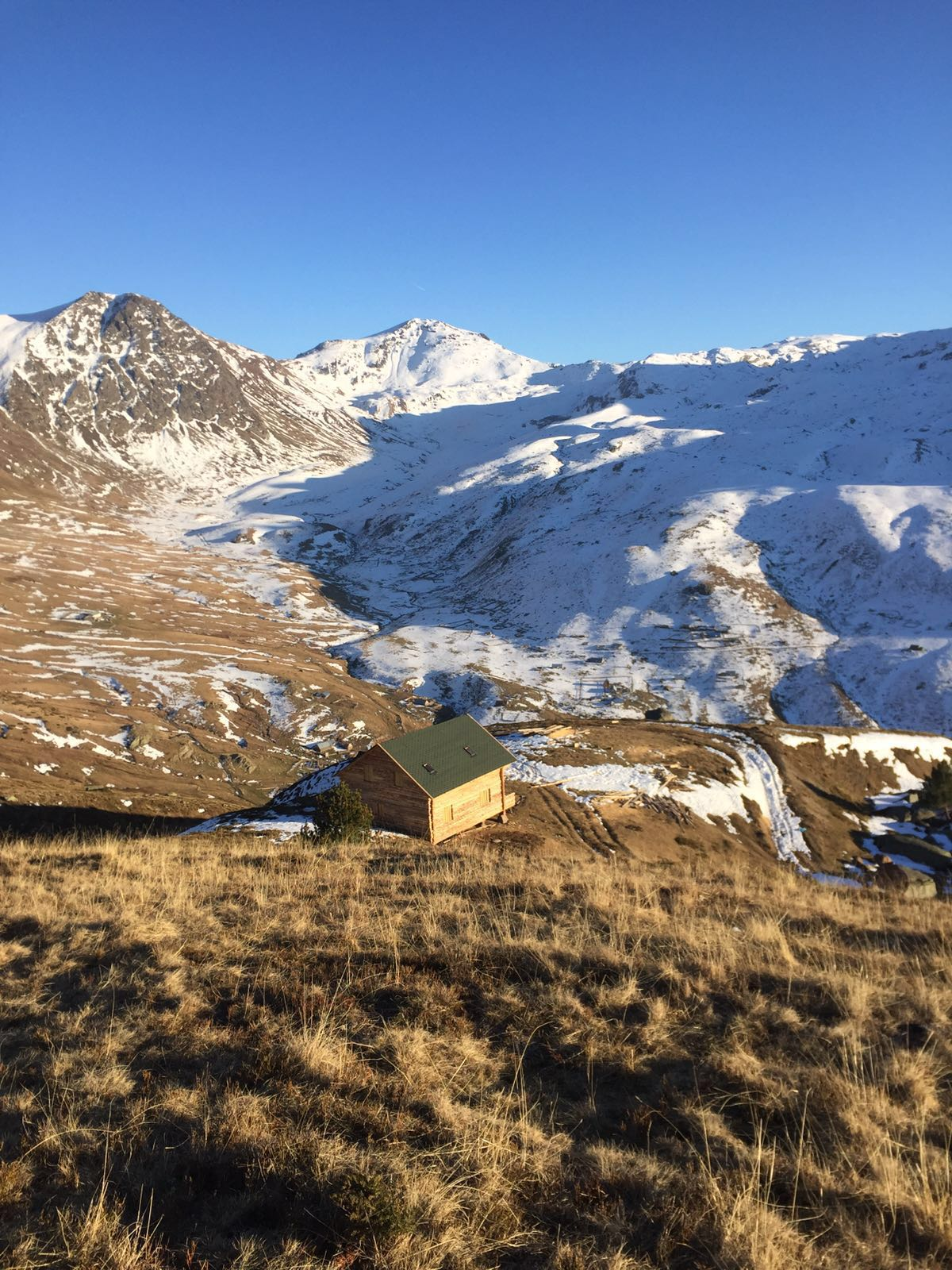
Source of Gashi

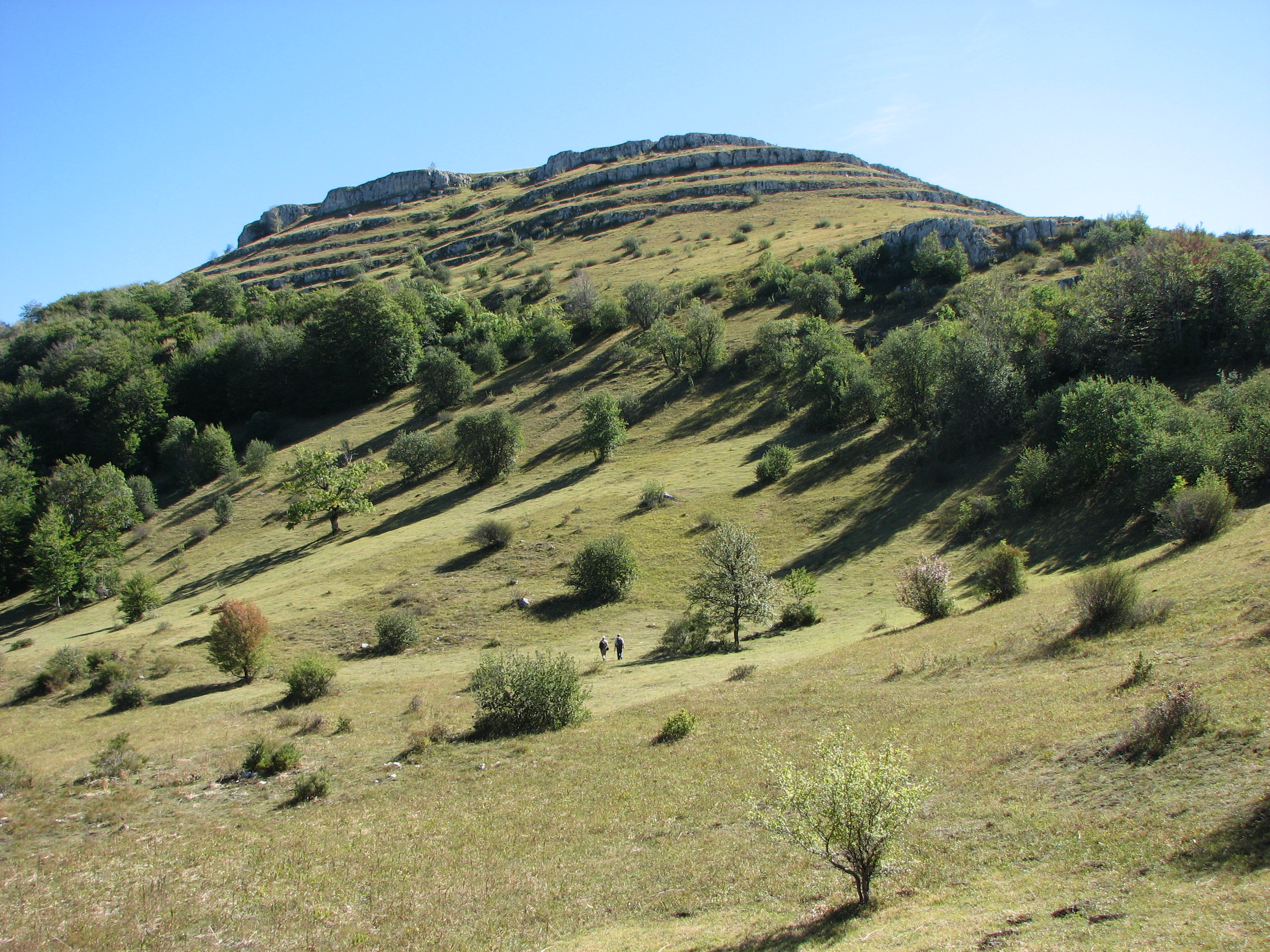
Pashtrik

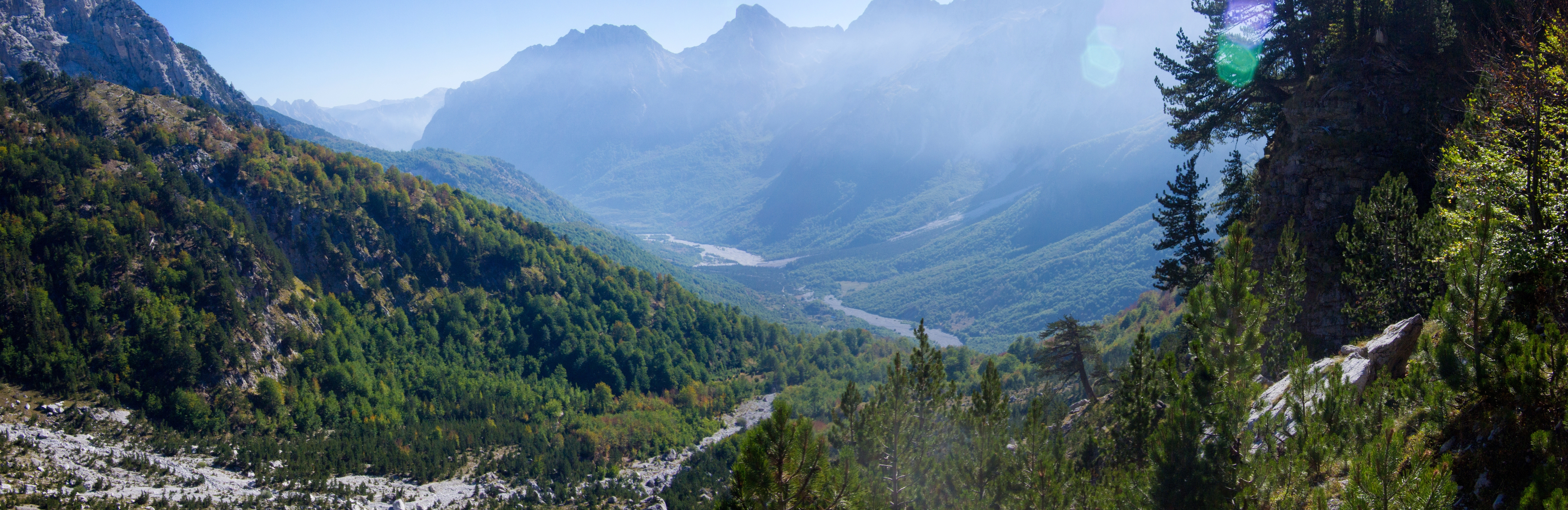
Valbonë Valley

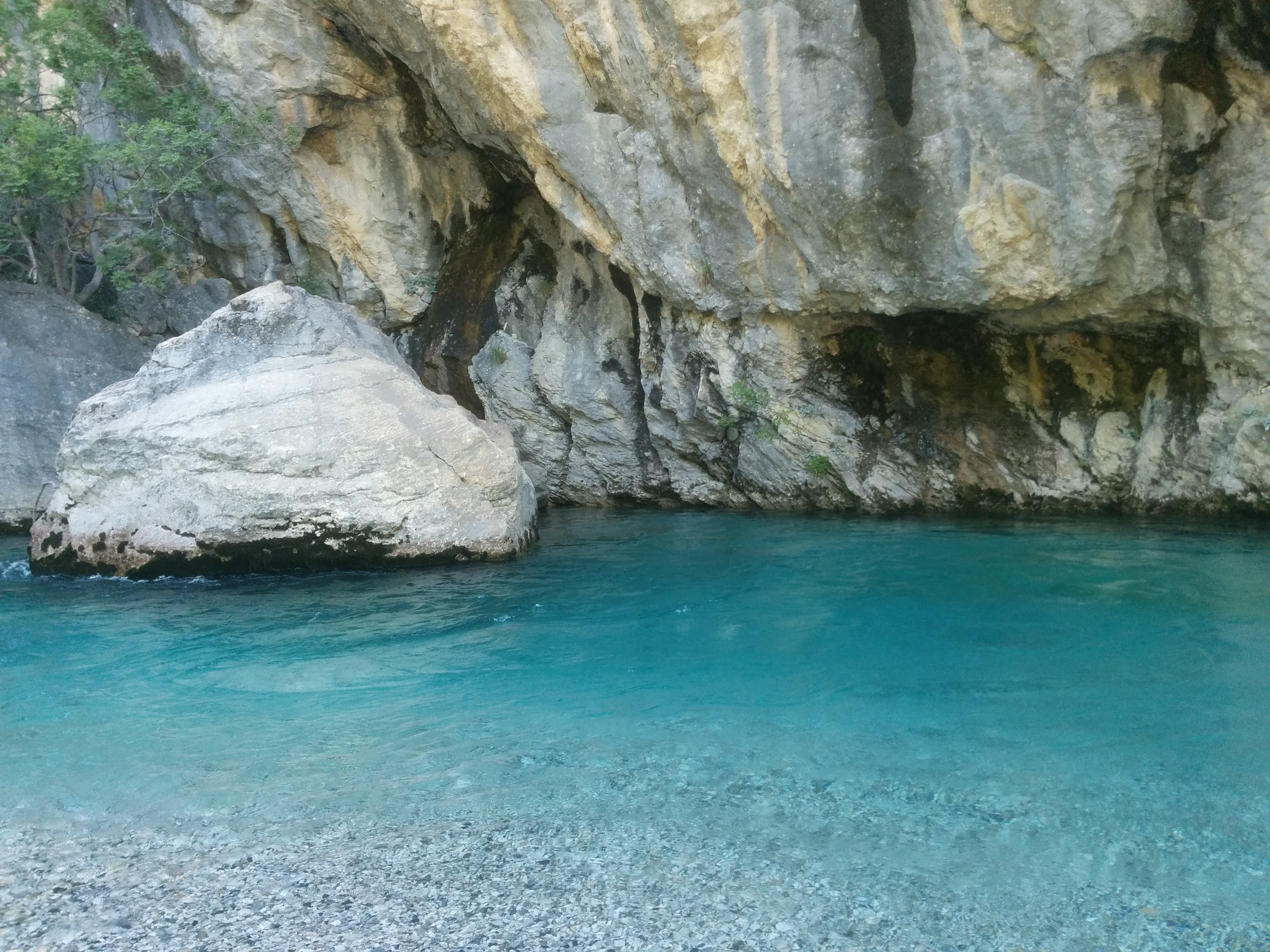
Valbona

== See also ==
- Geography of Albania
- Politics of Albania
- Divisions of Albania
