= Malzi =

- Administrative unit
- Location within Albania
- Coordinates: 42°5′N 20°17′E
- Country: Albania
- County: Kukës
- Municipality: Kukës

Population (2023)
  - Administrative unit: 1,616
- Time zone: UTC+1 (CET)
  - Summer (DST): UTC+2 (CEST)

Malzi (Albanian pronunciation: [malzi]; Albanian definite form: Malziu), historically also known as Mali i Zi, is an administrative unit in Kukës County, northeastern Albania. It comprises the villages of Çam, Dukagjin, Gdheshtë, Kalimash, Kryemadh, Mgullë, Petkaj, Pistë, Shëmri, Shikaj, Shtanë and Spas. The administrative unit had 1,616 residents at the 2023 census.

Malzi is also the name of a historical ethnographic region and bajrak. Traditionally counted among the seven bajraks of Pukë, it lay along the Drin and the former trade route between Shkodër and Prizren. Its historical territory was not identical to that of the present administrative unit.

== Etymology ==
The name Mali i Zi means "black mountain" in Albanian. The term is first recorded in a document of 1444, which names the region alongside Dagnum and Sati as Cernagora or Mali i Zi. Later forms include the Italian Montagna Nera in Gjon Muzaka's account of 1515, Monte Nero in a 1637 report by Frang Bardhi, and Malzi in a 1671 report by Shtjefën Gaspri.

The name has traditionally been attributed to the black pines that once covered the surrounding mountains. Elsie suggests that it may also be a loan translation from the Serbian word crnogorica, meaning conifer. The region is distinct from Montenegro, which is also called Mali i Zi in Albanian.

== History ==
=== Antiquity and the Middle Ages ===
In his study of fortifications along the Lissus–Naissus road, archaeologist Luan Përzhita identifies Vaspas with the ancient station of Crevenium. He also notes that 14th-century documents describe Vaspas as a customs station on the Shkodër–Gjakova route.

A chrysobull issued by Stefan Dušan in 1348 mentions Kruimada and its vineyards, together with the boundary of Shiklja. Linguist Skënder Gashi identifies these names with modern Kryemadh and Shikaj. In discussing the same boundary description, he also identifies the name Črna Gora with Mali i Zi. Jastrebov had earlier interpreted this Črna Gora as a mountain on the Has side of the Drin rather than as the name of a separate district.

=== Ottoman period ===
Albanologist Robert Elsie records repeated conflicts between the inhabitants of Malzi and the Ottoman authorities over taxation and military conscription. Such conflicts are mentioned in 1565, 1568, 1579, 1580, 1582, 1584, 1588, 1602, 1614, 1638 and 1680.

A visitation report written in June 1637 by Frang Bardhi, bishop of Sapa, placed Malzi on the route towards Serbia, near Spas. On 20 December 1638, Bardhi and Benedetto Orsini, bishop of Lezhë, concluded a boundary agreement following instructions issued by the Propaganda Fide on 24 April that year. The agreement, later printed with the acts of the Arbëni Council, assigned the churches and villages of the "land of Spas", between the rivers named in the source as Gloska and Lumi, to the Diocese of Sapa.

The visitation conducted by Vicko Zmajević in 1703 recorded Malzi as a Catholic parish of 14 settlements, containing 98 Catholic households and 766 inhabitants. The visitor described the parish as being in decline, reporting limited religious instruction and no intact church. In 1753, during his visitation of the Diocese of Lezhë, Anton Kryezezi reported that more than 40 years earlier the Christian population had either left Malzi or converted to Islam. He found only the family of Anton Gjoni and about 100 women remaining Catholic; a priest from Fan occasionally came to Gjoni's house to celebrate Mass.

Later travellers recorded material remains and local memories of the former Catholic population. In a work based on travels made in the early 1870s, Russian diplomat and ethnographer Ivan Jastrebov described Malzi's inhabitants as Muslim, although former church sites remained known. He reported that a Christian cemetery beside a mosque had been left undisturbed because local Muslims regarded it as the burial place of their ancestors. He was also told that the Muslim cleric (hoxha) of Dukagjin descended from the village's former priests and that priestly vestments were preserved in his house. In his 1908 account, Austro-Hungarian diplomat Theodor Anton Ippen recorded a similar tradition at Shëmri, where a Muslim hoxha was said to preserve vestments and a missal from the former Catholic church.

In 1850, Demë Simoni led fighters from Malzi in an uprising against Jusuf Beg of Pukë. Following an Ottoman punitive expedition in 1894, the region rose again under Rexhep Aga, Tahir Sinani and Hasan Rrahmani. The insurgents expelled Fejzulla Beg, a representative of the Ottoman government based in Pukë, from their territory.

In 1908, Austro-Hungarian geologist Franz Nopcsa recorded that Malzi obtained foodstuffs from the Prizren region and that some of its Muslim inhabitants spent about six months each year doing seasonal agricultural work in Greece.

=== Balkan Wars and Second World War ===
Malzi was occupied by Serbian forces in November and December 1912 during the First Balkan War. Fighting took place at Vaspas and Flet, with losses on both sides. Oral tradition records an episode in the spring of 1913 in which local defenders associated with Halil Mustafa used a cannon made from pear wood against Serbian forces. The cannon reportedly fired three rounds, and 24 fighters from Malzi were killed.

During World War II, partisan units from Tropojë and Kosovo attacked Italian occupation forces at Qafë-Mgullë on 15 March 1943. The action is commemorated by a roadside memorial. According to the same local account, Italian troops subsequently arrested men from Pistë and six were killed at Qafë-Likmetë, near Kryemadh, on 16 March 1943. A second memorial commemorates these victims.

== Geography ==
The historical region of Malzi lies on the southern side of the Drin, west of the city of Kukës. It bordered the traditional territory of Thaçi to the northwest, Has across the Drin to the northeast, Luma to the east, Fan to the south and Spaç to the west. Travelling through the area in 1908, British traveller and writer Edith Durham used Mal i Zi for both the district and a village on a grassy plateau.

Before Albania's 2015 local government reform, Malzi was a separate commune, with Shëmri serving as its administrative centre. Under the reform, it became an administrative unit of the municipality of Kukës. A regional development report published that year listed the Castle of Leka in Malzi among the area's cultural monuments.

=== Geology ===
An early geological survey of the area was conducted by Nopcsa. Around Spas and the Goska valley, he recorded diorite, serpentinite and hornstone-bearing rocks, as well as terraces beside the Drin. He interpreted gravel near Sakat, at an elevation of about 500 m (1,600 ft), as the remains of an older river terrace.

== Society and culture ==
=== Traditional organization ===
Malzi traditionally formed a single bajrak, with a population estimated at about 3,000 in accounts from the late 19th and early 20th centuries. Its inhabitants were of mixed or polyphyletic origin. It was therefore an ethnographic region with a distinct history and identity, rather than a fis whose members all claimed descent in the male line from a single ancestor.

According to an undated oral tradition recorded by Elsie, the bajraktar formerly belonged to the Skacaj family of Mgullë. One holder was killed fighting Montenegrin forces and the bajrak's standard was captured; Elsie records the next bajraktar as a member of the Krasniqi family living in Shikaj.

Elsie records families of Berisha in Pistë; Gashi in Shtanë; Krasniqi in Shikaj; Morina origin in Petkaj, Shikaj, Shpataj and Mgullë; and Shala in Dukagjin. He also records the tradition that the Gegaj brotherhood of Petkaj descended from Gega, an immigrant from Spaç, whose sons were Ndreu, Preçi and Papi. Other traditions connected the Simoni with Mirdita and the Kovaçi with southern Albania.

=== Economy ===
Chromium mining was an important source of employment around Kalimash during the socialist period. An Albanian Telegraphic Agency report published in 2010 describes a mining enterprise that operated between 1978 and 1994 and employed about 1,500 people during the 1980s. The same report describes subsequent extraction by smaller operators and local miners.

=== Runa festival ===
An annual gathering on Mount Runa is shared by inhabitants of Malzi and neighbouring Fan. Ippen recorded it as taking place on 2 July in the early 20th century. A modern local account places the traditional date on 1 July; it states that during the communist period the gathering was shifted to 10 July and associated with Army Day, before the earlier observance was revived in 1992.

== Demographics ==
In the early 1870s, Jastrebov counted 478 households in Malzi. The Austro-Hungarian census of 1918 recorded 357 inhabited dwellings, 385 households and 2,528 inhabitants in the historical tribal territory of Mali i Zi. A 1923 Albanian statistical survey recorded 3,310 inhabitants and 576 houses in the administrative district of Mali i Zi, which then comprised 17 villages.

The 1950 census recorded 3,899 inhabitants in the locality of Shëmri. By 1955 and 1960, Kalimash was enumerated separately from the locality of Shëmri. The combined populations of the Shëmri locality and Kalimash were 3,342 in 1955 and 4,205 in 1960.

In the 1979 census, the four census units of Kalimash, Pistë, Shëmri and Shikaj had a combined population of 5,339. The 1989 Albanian census gives 6,917 inhabitants for the territory of today's Malzi administrative unit. A demographic study gives a population of 5,017 at the 2001 census.

At the 2011 census, the former commune had 3,072 residents. By 2023 the resident population had fallen to 1,616, approximately 47.4 per cent fewer than in 2011.

Recorded population
Year	Population	Source
1918	2,528 (Note: Covers the historical tribal territory of Mali i Zi, which comprised 9 villages: Dukagjin, Kalimash, Kryemadh, Mgullë, Petkaj, Pistë, Spas, Shëmri and Shikaj.)	
1923	3,310 (Note: Covers the administrative district of Mali i Zi, which comprised 17 villages: Barbçorët, Dukagjin, Flet, Kalimash, Kryemadh, Mgullë, Mustafaj, Petkaj, Pistë, Sakat, Simon, Spas, Shëmri, Shikaj, Shtanë, Trun and Xhas.)	
1950	3,899 (Note: Covers the locality of Shëmri, which comprised 14 villages: Dardhë, Dukagjin, Kalimash, Kryemadh, Mgullë, Petkaj, Pistë, Sakat, Spas, Srriqe, Shëmri, Shikaj, Shtanë and Trun.)	
1955	3,342 (Note: Covers the locality of Shëmri and the village of Kalimash, which was enumerated under the locality of Qendër. Together they comprised 14 villages: Çam, Dukagjin, Kalimash, Kryemadh, Mgullë, Petkaj, Pistë, Sakat, Spas, Srriqe, Shëmri, Shikaj, Shtanë and Trun.)	
1960	4,205	
1979	5,339 (Note: Covers the four census units listed in Kukës District as Kalimash, Pistë, Shëmri and Shikaj. The source does not list their constituent villages.)	
1989	6,917 (Note: Covers today's administrative unit, which comprises 12 villages: Çam, Dukagjin, Gdheshtë, Kalimash, Kryemadh, Mgullë, Petkaj, Pistë, Spas, Shëmri, Shikaj and Shtanë.)	
2001	5,017	
2011	3,072	
2023	1,616	

== Sources ==
- Durham, Edith (1909). High Albania. London: Edward Arnold. OCLC 307659.
- Elsie, Robert (2015). The Tribes of Albania: History, Society and Culture. Library of Balkan Studies. Vol. 1. London: I.B. Tauris. ISBN 978-1-78453-401-1.
- Ippen, Theodor Anton (1908). Die Gebirge des nordwestlichen Albaniens (PDF). Abhandlungen der K. K. Geographischen Gesellschaft in Wien (in German). Vol. 7, no. 1. Vienna: R. Lechner.
- Jastrebov, Ivan Stepanovich (1904). Стара Сербія и Албанія: Путевыя записки [Old Serbia and Albania: Travel Notes]. Spomenik Srpske kraljevske akademije, XLI, drugi razred 36 (in Russian). Belgrade: Državna štamparija Kraljevine Srbije.
- Nopcsa, Franz (1907). "A katholikus Észak-Albánia". Földrajzi Közlemények (in Hungarian). 35: 191–213, 243–266.
- Seiner, Franz (1922). Ergebnisse der Volkszählung in Albanien in dem von den österr.-ungar. Truppen 1916–1918 besetzten Gebiete. Schriften der Balkankommission, Linguistische Abteilung (in German). Vol. 13. Vienna and Leipzig: Hölder-Pichler-Tempsky.
- Selenica, Teki (1923). Shqipëria më 1923 (PDF) (in Albanian). Tirana: Shtypshkronja "Tirana".
- Thallóczy, Lajos; Jireček, Konstantin; Šufflay, Milan, eds. (1918). Acta et diplomata res Albaniae mediae aetatis illustrantia (in Latin). Vol. II. Vienna: Typis Adolphi Holzhausen.
