= Spas, Kukës =

Spas
- Village
- Location within Albania
- Coordinates: 42°9′N 20°15′E
- Country: Albania
- County: Kukës
- Municipality: Kukës
- Administrative unit: Malzi
- Time zone: UTC+1 (CET)
  - Summer (DST): UTC+2 (CEST)

Spas (Albanian pronunciation: [spas]; Albanian definite form: Spasi), historically also known as Vaspas or Vau i Spasit, is a village in the former municipality of Malzi in Kukës County, Albania. At the 2015 local government reform it became part of the municipality Kukës.

== Etymology ==
The name Spas derives from the Slavic term for "the Saviour", a title of Jesus. The editors of the medieval documents identify the recorded form lo Spaiso with the South Slavic expression Sveti Spas ("Holy Saviour"). Ami Boué likewise wrote that Spas meant "the Saviour" in Serbian and suggested that the river crossing had given the locality its name, Vau i Spasit. Theodor Ippen associated the village's name with the period of rule by the Serbian Nemanjić dynasty and rendered the Albanian name Vau i Spasit as "the ford of Spas".

== History ==
According to Ermanno Armao(sq), Spas is first mentioned in documents from 1307, as it lay along an old medieval route from the Adriatic Sea through Pukë to Gjakova. That same year, two Venetian merchants were reportedly attacked and robbed in the village by an official of the Serbian king, Stefan Milutin. Thallóczy, Jireček and Šufflay, however, place the incident in the Venetian year of 1309. They also identify the two merchants as Andrea and Giovanni Sabatini and their attacker as Branilo, the count of Prizren. In May 1334, King Stefan Dušan granted Hilandar an annual income of 150 perpers from the customs duties collected at Spas. In 1377, a toll of two grossi was levied in Spas for each load transported across the Drin.

The village is later recorded in the three Ottoman defters of 1529–1536, 1571, and 1591. Franz Nopcsa identified the Spas shown on Gerardus Mercator's 1589 map with Vau i Spasit, noting that the medieval route from Shkodër through Gjakova to Lipjan passed the locality. In June 1638, Frang Bardhi wrote: "The eighth village is Spas, with four houses and eight inhabitants, which has the Church of Saint Stephen as its parish church." In 1662, Evliya Çelebi passed through Spas, which he described as a small town in the Sanjak of Dukagjin with 1,000 houses, 1,000 select Albanian musketeers, one congregational mosque, one han, and five to ten shops. Vicko Zmajević also mentioned the village in 1703.

In the early 1870s, Ivan Jastrebov counted 50 houses in Spas and described it as the best-known of the villages of Malzi among travellers because of its location. He also recorded that, when a mosque was built in Spas on the site of a ruined church, three small bells were unearthed. They subsequently passed into the possession of the inhabitants of Fan, who purchased them with financial assistance from the Propaganda Fide. A related account appears in a 1939 work by Dom Nikollë Kimza, parish priest of the village of Kalivarë in Mirditë, who records that in Spas, at least 170 years earlier, a church bell dating to 1436 and weighing about 100 kg had been sold to the village of Kalivarë. In 1908, Theodor Ippen recorded, on the right bank of the Drin opposite Spas, a ruin known locally as Kalaja e Lekë Dukagjinit ("Lekë Dukagjini's Castle").

== Bibliography ==
- Armao, Ermanno (1933). Località, chiese, fiumi, monti, e toponimi varii di un'antica carta dell'Albania Settentrionale. Pubblicazioni dell'Istituto per l'Europa Orientale (in Italian). Rome: Istituto per l'Europa Orientale.
- Boué, Ami (1854). Recueil d'itinéraires dans la Turquie d'Europe: détails géographiques, topographiques et statistiques sur cet empire (in French). Vol. II. Vienna: En commission chez W. Braumüller.
- Dankoff, Robert; Elsie, Robert, eds. (2000). Evliya Çelebi in Albania and Adjacent Regions (Kosovo, Montenegro, Ohrid): The Relevant Sections of the Seyahatname. Evliya Çelebi's Book of Travels. Vol. 5. Leiden: Brill. ISBN 978-90-04-11624-5.
- Hoxha, Shefqet (2013). Malziu (Bubrrime historike-etnologjike-folklorike-gjuhësore) (in Albanian). Mirgeeralb. ISBN 978-99280-7-196-5.
- Ippen, Theodor Anton (1908). Die Gebirge des nordwestlichen Albaniens (PDF). Abhandlungen der K. K. Geographischen Gesellschaft in Wien (in German). Vol. VII, no. 1. Vienna: R. Lechner. OCLC 65534766.
- Jastrebov, Ivan Stepanovich (1904). Stara Serbija i Albanija: putevyia zapiski Стара Сербія и Албанія: путевыя записки. Spomenik Srpske kraljevske akademije, second class, book 36 (in Russian). Vol. XLI. Belgrade: Državna štamparija Kraljevine Srbije.
- Nopcsa, Franz (1929). "Zur Geschichte der okzidentälen Kartographie Nordalbaniens". Geographie und Geologie Nordalbaniens. Geologica Hungarica, Series Geologica (in German). Vol. III. Budapest: Institutum Regni Hungariae Geologicum. pp. 651–703.
- Thallóczy, Lajos; Jireček, Konstantin; Šufflay, Milan, eds. (1913). Acta et diplomata res Albaniae mediae aetatis illustrantia (in Latin). Vol. I. Vienna: Typis Adolphi Holzhausen. OCLC 930431973.
- Thallóczy, Lajos; Jireček, Konstantin; Šufflay, Milan, eds. (1918). Acta et diplomata res Albaniae mediae aetatis illustrantia (in Latin). Vol. II. Vienna: Typis Adolphi Holzhausen. OCLC 930431973.
