= Kryemadh =

- Village
- Location within Albania
- Coordinates: 42°5′N 20°18′E
- Country: Albania
- County: Kukës
- Municipality: Kukës
- Administrative unit: Malzi
- Time zone: UTC+1 (CET)
  - Summer (DST): UTC+2 (CEST)

Kryemadh (Albanian pronunciation: [kɾyɛ'mað]; Albanian definite form: Kryemadhi) is a village in the former municipality of Malzi in Kukës County, Albania. At the 2015 local government reform it became part of the municipality Kukës.

== History ==
The village was first recorded in a 1348 Serbian chrysobull attributed to the tsar Stefan Dušan. That same year, Dušan founded the Monastery of the Holy Archangels in Prizren and granted it land and feudal rights through this chrysobull. One of these lands was Kryemadh.

The village appears again in two of the three Ottoman defters from the 16th century, those of 1571 and 1591.

Its next recorded mention comes from Vicko Zmajević in 1703, and later from Ivan Jastrebov in the early 1870s, who wrote: "Nowadays, the inhabitants of Kryemadh engage in viticulture and produce rakia and wine, which they sell in shelters along the Drin, as well as to the inhabitants of Fan."

== Bibliography ==
- Hoxha, Shefqet (2013). Malziu (Bubrrime historike-etnologjike-folklorike-gjuhësore) (in Albanian). Mirgeeralb. ISBN 978-99280-7-196-5.
