= Dukagjin, Kukës =

Dukagjin
- Village
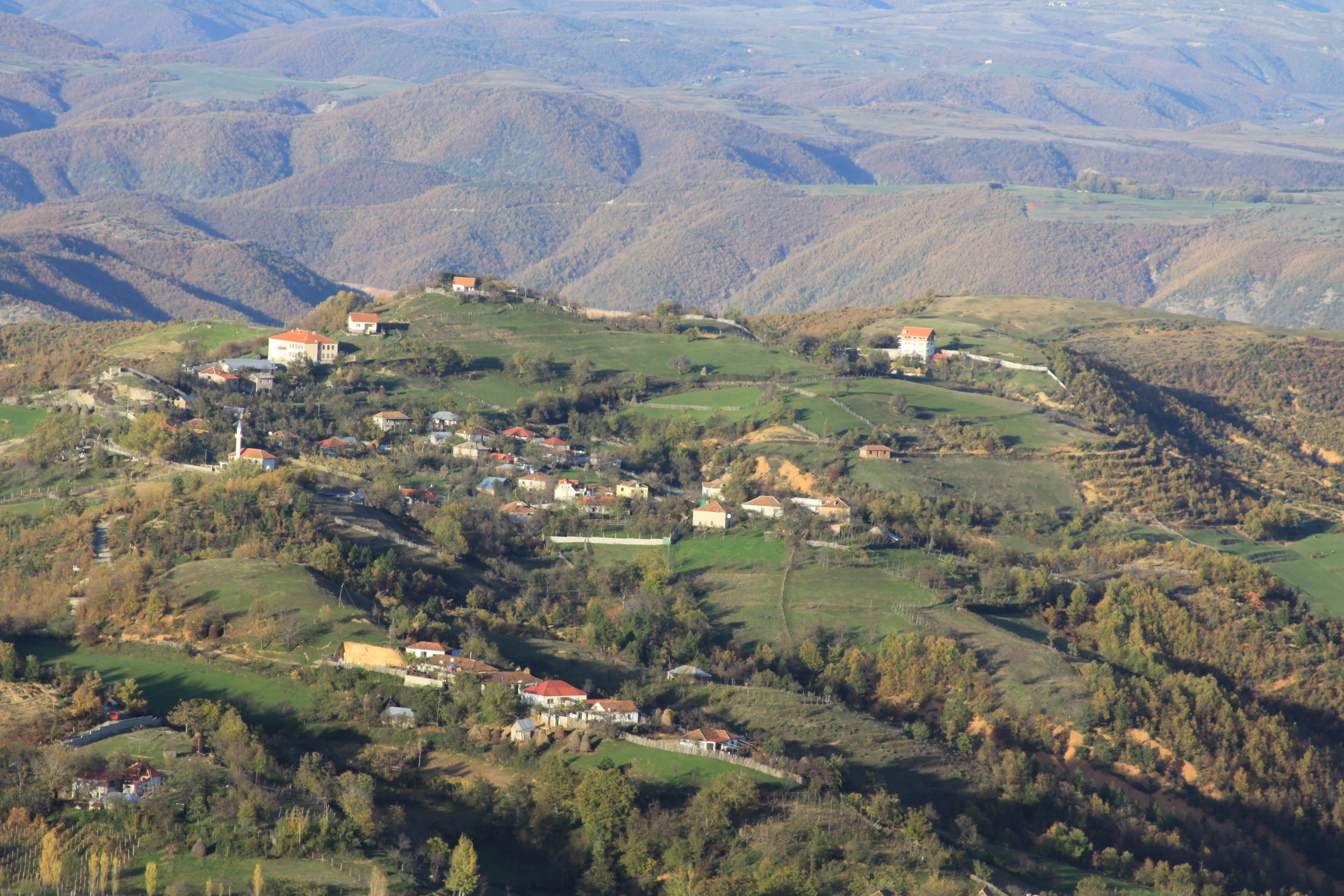
- Dukagjin seen from the SH5 Road

- Location within Albania
- Coordinates: 42°7′N 20°17′E
- Country: Albania
- County: Kukës
- Municipality: Kukës
- Administrative unit: Malzi
- Time zone: UTC+1 (CET)
  - Summer (DST): UTC+2 (CEST)

Dukagjin (Albanian pronunciation: [duka'ɟin]; Albanian definite form: Dukagjini) is a village in the former municipality of Malzi in Kukës County, Albania. At the 2015 local government reform it became part of the municipality Kukës.

== Etymology ==
The name of the village is derived from the Albanian noble family of the Dukagjini from the Late Middle Ages, which ruled the area before the Ottoman invasion.

== History ==
Unlike many other villages in the area, Dukagjin is not mentioned in any of the three Ottoman defters in the 16th century. It was first mentioned in June 1638 by Frang Bardhi, with its present name. He notes: "The second village is Dukagjin, consisting of 15 houses and 100 inhabitants, which also has the earlier mentioned Church of Saint Sebastian as its church."

In the late 19th century, Albanologist Theodor Ippen noted that the imam of Dukagjin still preserved the decorations from the altar of the former Catholic Church. A similar observation was made by Ivan Jastrebov in the early 1870s, who wrote that a local resident had informed him of an imam in Dukagjin who was said to be descended from the village's Catholic priests. This imam reportedly kept items belonging to the priests in his home. Furthermore, the current mosque is believed to have been constructed on the ruins of the old church.

In September 1923, the first Albanian-language school in the area of Malzi was opened in Dukagjin.

== Bibliography ==
- Hoxha, Shefqet (2013). Malziu (Bubrrime historike-etnologjike-folklorike-gjuhësore) (in Albanian). Mirgeeralb. ISBN 978-99280-7-196-5.
