= Alfred Rappaport =

Alfred Rappaport may refer to:

- Alfred Rappaport (diplomat) (1868–1946), Austrian diplomat
- Alfred Rappaport (economist) (born 1932), American economist
