= Shëmri =

Shëmri or Shëmria may refer to:

- Shëmri, Kukës, a village in the municipality of Kukës, Albania
- Shëmri, Kurbin, a village in the municipality of Kurbin, Albania
- Shëmri, Mirditë, a village in the municipality of Mirditë, Albania
