= Theodor Anton Ippen =

Austro-Hungarian Albanologist and diplomat

Theodor Anton Max Ippen
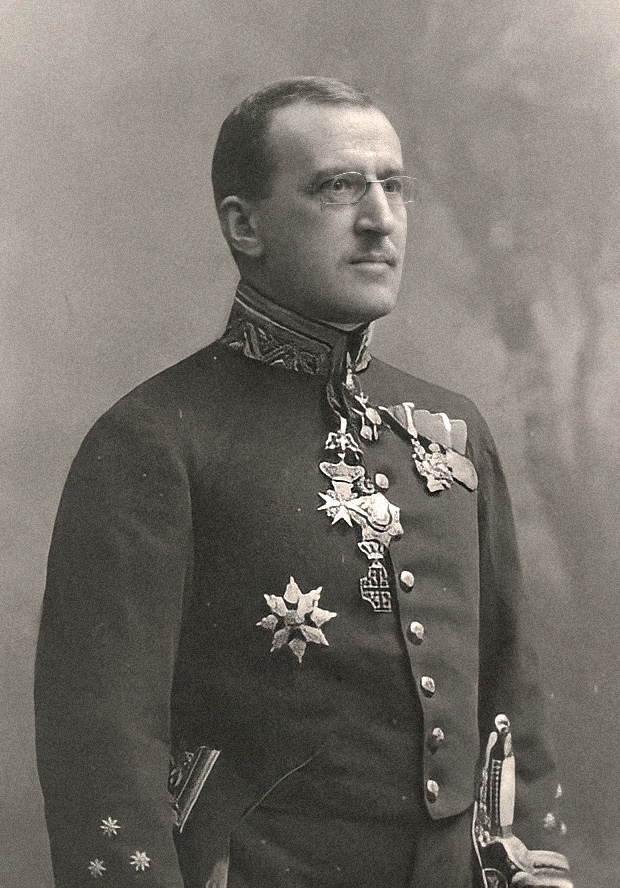
- Ippen in 1902
- Born: November 29, 1861; Sezemice, Austrian Empire
- Died: January 31, 1935 (aged 73); Vienna, Austria
- Education: Oriental languages and economics at the Oriental Academy in Vienna
- Occupation: diplomat
- Employer: Foreign Ministry of Austria-Hungary

Theodor Anton Max Ippen (November 29, 1861 – January 31, 1935) was an Albanologist and diplomat from Austria-Hungary. Ippen belonged to the group of Albanologists who published their works on Albania through the state-financed institutes of Austria-Hungary in order to create the Albanian national consciousness which he believed would be beneficial for the dual monarchy. Ippen supported the establishment of an independent nation-state of Albanians. He served as diplomat in Shkoder, Pljevlja, Istanbul, Jerusalem, Athens and London where he advised ambassador of Austria-Hungary during London Conference which ended with signing of the London treaty and a decision to establish the Principality of Albania reached on 29 July 1913. During the period between 1921 and 1927, he was a member of the International Danube Commission.

== Early life ==
Ippen was born on 29 November 1861 to a family of baptized Jews in Sezemice.

== Diplomatic career ==
Ippen studied the oriental languages and economics at the Oriental Academy in Vienna. He started his career of diplomat serving at the consulate of Austria-Hungary in Ottoman held Shkodër in Albania between 1884 and 1887. At the end of 1887 he was appointed as Austro-Hungarian diplomat in Pljevlja (vice-consul), Istanbul (1891—1893) and Jerusalem (1893—1895), Istanbul (1895—1897), and again in Shkodër (1897—1904).

In the period from 1905 to 1909 he continued his diplomatic career in Athens, Greece, and after 1909 in London, where he advised the ambassador of Austria-Hungary during the London Conference, which was intended to arbitrate between the combatants in the First Balkan War. In 1912 Ippen prepared an ethnographic map of the Albanian-populated areas of Ottoman Empire, which was submitted by the Austro-Hungarian ambassador during the London Conference as a basis for the border negotiations. After the London treaty has been signed the ambassadors of six Great Powers decided, in July 1913, to constitute a new state, Albania, as a hereditary principality. In period between 1921 and 1927 he was a member of the International Danube Commission.

== Albania ==
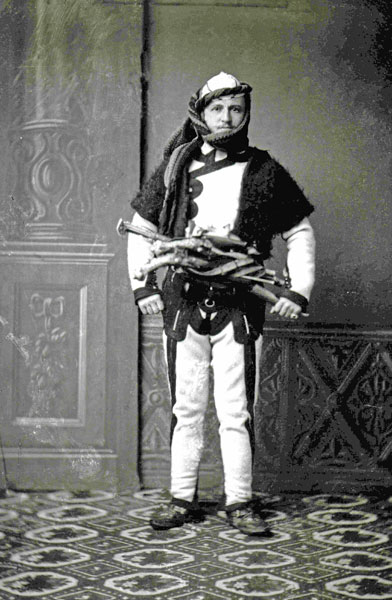
Theodor Ippen in Shkodër wearing a northern Albanian costume

Ippen belonged to the group of Albanologists whose works were published through the state-financed institutes of Austria-Hungary. He participated in the writing and dissemination of the first history of Albania published in the Albanian language because he insisted that creating Albanian national consciousness would be beneficial for the dual monarchy. Ippen struggled for the establishment of an independent nation-state of Albanians.

The group of Western scholars he belonged to played a significant role in the creation and dissemination of the myths of Albanian nationalism, i.e., the myth of a connection of Ali Pasha with the Islamic Bektashi Order, aimed to use Bektashism in creation of the 'Albanian identity' and an 'Albanian state'. Ippen and Nopcsa openly propagated their efforts in financing activities of Albanian nationalists, for example the translation and distribution of the works authored by Sami Frasheri.

In period between 1897 and 1903 he was a consul of Austria-Hungary in Shkodër, then in the Ottoman Empire. In October 1897 Ippen traveled to central Albania and established contacts with important beys in Elbassan and Tirana. Ippen had extensively visited the Catholic clans on the Ottoman-Montenegrin border and reported their problems caused by the Ottoman and Montenegrin authorities. To improve their conditions he asked for provisions of assistance, which were granted as from 1898 to 1903 corn was regularly distributed to the clans, which in turn became pro-Austrian. Ippen distributed money to Albanian families, especially to Albanians from Hoti and Grudë clans who were populated near Montenegrin border and most exposed to Montenegrin influence.

It was Ippen who asserted that Skanderbeg was buried within the fortifications of Lezhë. His opinion was based on the work of Barletius who wrote that Skanderbeg was buried in the Church of St. Nicholas, without explanation if the church's building was inside or outside the castle. Ippen assumed that such notable person like Skanderbeg would have been buried in the best place of the city, in its castle. He also speculated that the Ottomans transformed this church into a mosque. According to Ippen's estimations around 20,000 Albanians fled parts of Ottoman Empire captured by Serbia during Serbian-Ottoman War (1877-1878).

Ippen was one of the authors whose texts were published in the periodical Albania published by Faik Konitza in period 1897—1910. Konitza assured Ippen that he and his friends believed that Albania should be in political and military union with Austria.

== Bibliography ==
=== Books ===
- Novibazar und Kossovo (das alte Rascien). Eine studie ... (in German), Vienna: A. Hölder, 1892, OCLC 14192433
- Rascien, Knjižnica Odsjeka za povijest, 1894
- Stare crkvene ruševine u Albaniji [Old church ruins in Albania] (in Bosnian), Sarajevo, Austria-Hungary: Zemaljska štamparija, 1899
- Stari spomenici u Albaniji [Old monuments in Albania] (in Bosnian), Sarajevo, Austria-Hungary: Zemaljska štamparija, 1900
- Stare crkve i crkvene ruševine u Albaniji [Old churches and church ruins in Albania] (in Bosnian), Sarajevo, Austria-Hungary: Zemaljska štamparija, 1901
- Das religiöse Protektorat Österreich-Ungarns in der Türkei, in: Die Kultur III, Wien 1901/1902
- Historički gradovi u Albaniji [Historical cities in Albania] (in Bosnian), Sarajevo, Austria-Hungary: Zemaljska štamparija, 1902
- Pečatnik jedne već nestale biskupine u Albaniji (in Bosnian), Sarajevo?, Austria-Hungary: Zemaljska štamparija, c. 1903
- Skutari und die nordalbanische Küstenebene (in German), Sarajevo: D.A. Kajon, 1907, OCLC 25198388
- Die Gebirge des nordwestlichen Albaniens (in German), Wien: Lechner, 1908, OCLC 65534766
- Illyrisch-albanische forschungen (in German), München, Leipzig: Duncker & Humblot, 1916, OCLC 35691167 - coauthored with Ludwig Thallóczy; Konstantin Jireček; Milan Šufflay; Ernst C Sedlmayr; Josef Ivanič; Imre Karácson; Béla Péch; Karl Thopia
- Gjerak Karaiskaj; Ardian Klosi, eds. (2002), Shqipëria e vjetër : studime gjeografike, etnografike, historike, nga ish-konsulli i përgjithshëm i monarkisë austro-hungareze në Shkodër (in Albanian), Tirana: K&B, ISBN 9789992777763, OCLC 819321262
- Fejzi Isa Domni, ed. (2003), Coptimi i Shqipnise : Konferencas e pare e Londonit 1912-1913, Konferenca e dyte e Londonit, 1915-1916, Zaptimi i Shqipnise 7 Prille 1939 = The dismemberment of the Albanian nation (in Albanian), Massapequa Park: F. Domni, OCLC 55222354

=== Articles ===
Published in 'Glasnik Zemaljskog muzeja u Bosni i Hercegovini', within series 'Zbirka povjesti' by Zemaljska štamparija [State's printing house] in Sarajevo, Austria-Hungary:

- "Crkva u Širdžiju", WebPAC - Knjižnice Filozofskog fakulteta u Zagrebu, vol. 11, 1899, pp. 13–16
- "Crkve u Šasu", WebPAC - Knjižnice Filozofskog fakulteta u Zagrebu, vol. 11, 1899, pp. 17–21
- "Crkva u Rubigu", WebPAC - Knjižnice Filozofskog fakulteta u Zagrebu, vol. 11, 1899, pp. 21–23
- "Crkva u mjestu Lači", WebPAC - Knjižnice Filozofskog fakulteta u Zagrebu, vol. 11, 1899, pp. 607–610
- "Ruševine crkve sv. Nikole u Šatima", WebPAC - Knjižnice Filozofskog fakulteta u Zagrebu, vol. 12, 1900, pp. 83–92
- "Ruševina crkve u Ostrošu", WebPAC - Knjižnice Filozofskog fakulteta u Zagrebu, vol. 12, 1900, pp. 92–97
- "Stari spomenici u Albaniji", WebPAC - Knjižnice Filozofskog fakulteta u Zagrebu, vol. 12, 1900, pp. 511–531
- "Starine iz Albanije", WebPAC - Knjižnice Filozofskog fakulteta u Zagrebu, vol. 13, 1901, pp. 117–120
- "Nadgrobni spomenik kneza Karla Topije od Albanije", WebPAC - Knjižnice Filozofskog fakulteta u Zagrebu, vol. 13, 1901, pp. 439–442
- "Stare crkve i crkvene ruševine u Albaniji", WebPAC - Knjižnice Filozofskog fakulteta u Zagrebu, vol. 13, 1901, pp. 577–588
- "Prehistorički nalazi iz Albanije", WebPAC - Knjižnice Filozofskog fakulteta u Zagrebu, vol. 13, 1901, pp. 603–608
- "Historički gradovi u Albaniji", WebPAC - Knjižnice Filozofskog fakulteta u Zagrebu, vol. 14, 1902, pp. 177–199
- "Pečatnik jedne već nestale biskupije u Albaniji", WebPAC - Knjižnice Filozofskog fakulteta u Zagrebu, vol. 14, 1902, pp. 367–368
- "Još nešto o starim crkvama u Šasu i Rubigu u Albaniji", WebPAC - Knjižnice Filozofskog fakulteta u Zagrebu, vol. 14, 1902, pp. 552–557
- "Arheološke bilješke iz Albanije", WebPAC - Knjižnice Filozofskog fakulteta u Zagrebu, vol. 15, 1903, pp. 181–183

Published in 'Die Kultur', Vienna, Austria-Hungary:

- Das religiöse Protectorat Österreich-Ungarns in der Türkei, Volume 3 (1901/1902), 298-310

== See also ==
- Ludwig Thallóczy
- Alfred Rappaport
