= Çam, Kukës =

Çam
- Village
- Location within Albania
- Coordinates: 42°5′N 20°12′E
- Country: Albania
- County: Kukës
- Municipality: Kukës
- Administrative unit: Malzi
- Time zone: UTC+1 (CET)
  - Summer (DST): UTC+2 (CEST)

Çam (Albanian pronunciation: [tʃam]; Albanian definite form: Çami) is a village in the former municipality of Malzi in Kukës County, Albania. At the 2015 local government reform it became part of the municipality Kukës.
