= Herceghalom rail crash =

1916 railway accident in Hungary

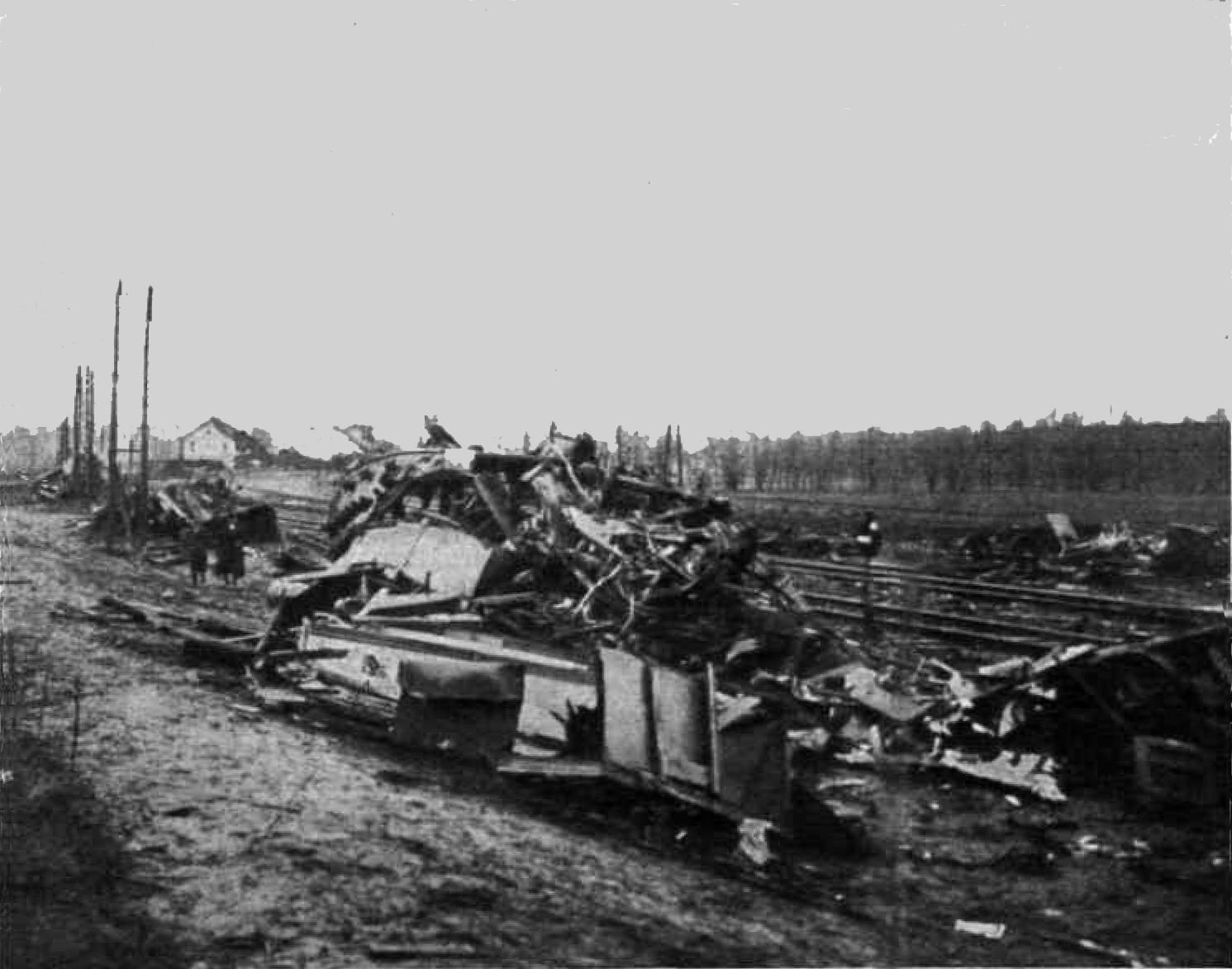
- Herceghalom rail crash

Details
- Date: 1 December 1916; 00:24
- Location: Herceghalom station
- Coordinates: 47°29′37″N 18°44′36″E
- Country: Hungary
- Line: Budapest–Hegyeshalom line
- Cause: Signal passed at danger

Statistics
- Trains: 2
- Deaths: 69
- Injured: 164 in total, 60 of them heavily

The Herceghalom rail crash occurred on 1 December 1916 at 00:24 in the station of Herceghalom, Hungary, on the Budapest–Hegyeshalom line as a side collision of an express train running into a shunting passenger train. 69 people were killed. This is the deadliest train incident in Hungary.

== Background ==
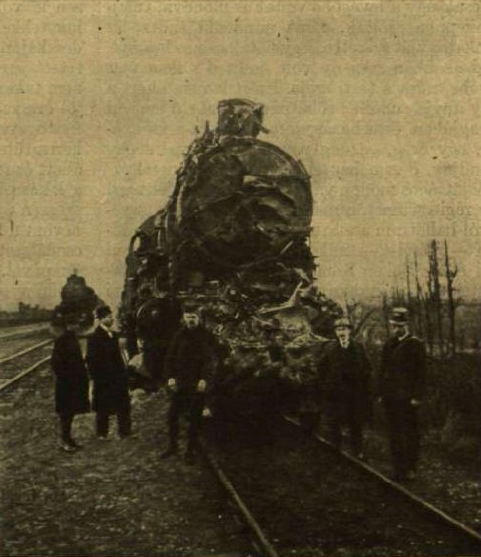
Damaged steam locomotive for the first part of express train N^{o} 3

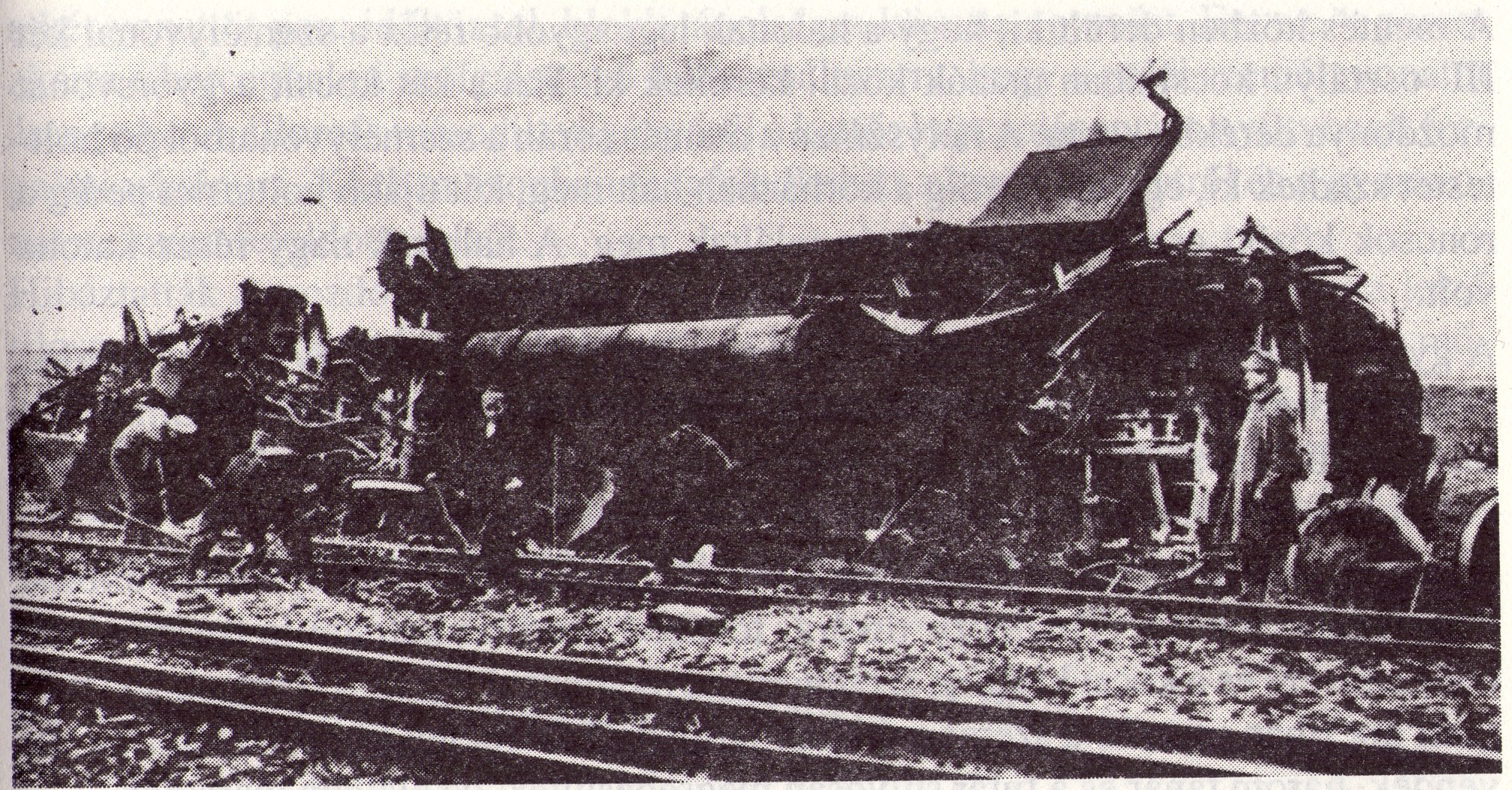
Destroyed carriages of passenger train N^{o} 1308

Emperor Franz Joseph I of Austria, who was also King of Hungary, Croatia and Bohemia had died on 21 November 1916 in Schönbrunn. The funeral was held on 30 November 1916. Many mourners from Hungarian area travelled home by train. They used two special trains in the night of 30 November to 1 December 1916. The express train N^{o} 3 from Vienna to Budapest was split into two parts because of the high demand. The trains were delayed.

Passenger train N^{o} 1308 from Budapest via Győr to Graz should have used track N^{o} 3, but had been inadvertently led to track N^{o} 2. The station master wanted to correct this mistake, but miscalculated the time that the delayed express train would need to reach the station. He ordered that the passenger train should move to track N^{o} 3. He secured this movement by displaying "Stop" at the entry signal.

== Accident ==
The engine driver of the first part of express train N^{o} 3 passed the pre-signal with a speed of 76 km/h (47 mph). He said that he had not seen the request to stop. He saw the "Stop" signal 700 metres (770 yd) down the line and began to brake hitting the shunting passenger train in its side after another 500 m (550 yd). Seven carriages of the passenger train and one saloon car and one first-class passenger car of the express train were completely destroyed. All comments about the signals and the begin of braking are from the engine driver, as no automated control systems were installed.

== Fatalities and injuries ==
69 people, including Lajos Thallóczy, were killed. 164 were wounded, 60 of them severely.
