= Shtanë =

- Village
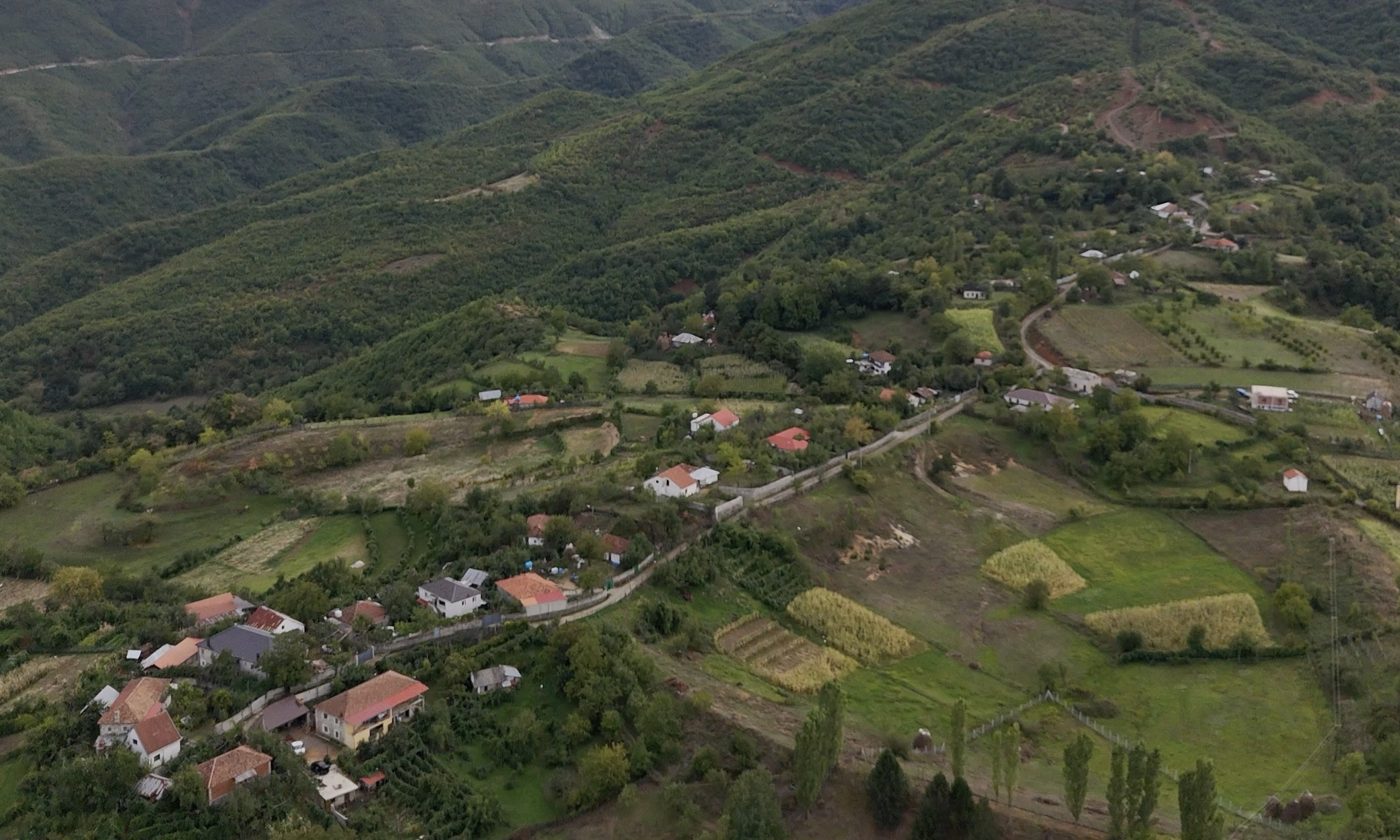
- Shtanë seen from above

- Location within Albania
- Coordinates: 42°6′N 20°16′E
- Country: Albania
- County: Kukës
- Municipality: Kukës
- Administrative unit: Malzi
- Time zone: UTC+1 (CET)
  - Summer (DST): UTC+2 (CEST)

Shtanë (Albanian pronunciation: [ʃtanə]; Albanian definite form: Shtana) is a village in the former municipality of Malzi in Kukës County, Albania. At the 2015 local government reform it became part of the municipality Kukës.

== Etymology ==
Shtanë was first recorded in a 1348 Serbian chrysobull attributed to the tsar Stefan Dušan, where it was referred to as Koshtani. Scholars contend that the name Koshtani has roots in the Latin term Castanea, which translates to chestnut in English. The village was named after the Latin loanword from the native Albanian population due to the abundance of chestnut trees in the area.

Over time, the name underwent phonetic changes and transformed into its present-day version, Shtanë.

== Bibliography ==
- Hoxha, Shefqet (2013). Malziu (Bubrrime historike-etnologjike-folklorike-gjuhësore) (in Albanian). Mirgeeralb. ISBN 978-99280-7-196-5.
