= Lajos Thallóczy =

Hungarian historian, politician and diplomat

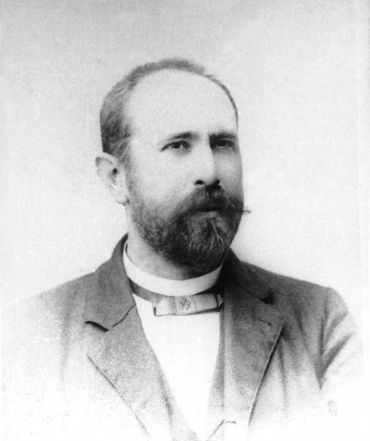
- Lajos Thallóczy
- Born: Ludwig Strommer; 8 December 1857; Kassa, Kingdom of Hungary, Austrian Empire
- Died: 1 December 1916 (aged 58); Herceghalom, Austria-Hungary
- Resting place: Kerepesi cemetery in Budapest; 47°29′44.77″N 19°5′26.11″E
- Other names: Ludwig von Thalloczy; Ludovicus de Thallóczy
- Awards: Order of Franz Joseph; Order of Leopold

Lajos Thallóczy (born Ludwig Strommer, also known as Ludwig von Thallóczy; 8 December 1857 – 1 December 1916) was a Hungarian historian, a politician and diplomat, the head of the joint finance department of the Dual Monarchy, a member of the Hungarian Academy of Sciences, the president of the Hungarian Historical Society from 1913 to 1916 and a renowned albanologist. As a diplomat in Austria-Hungary he played a very significant role in the Balkans as he was considered an expert on the history of the region. He was one of the most important advisers to Gyula Andrássy and Béni Kállay in questions of Balkan policy and even to the emperor Franz Joseph and to the minister of the government. His academic work has produced respected results in the study of south Slavic countries and he is regarded as the founder of modern Hungarian researches of the Balkans.

== Biography ==
Ludwig Strommer was born into a German-speaking family in the Hungarian city of Kaschau or Kassa (today Košice, Slovakia) on 8 December 1856. He came from a family of officials and teachers, his father Benedek Strommer was an imperial official who did not speak Hungarian. The Strommer family moved from Kassa to Buda where Ludwig went to Hungarian school. in 1877 he changed his name from Ludwig Strommer to Lajos (= Ludwig) Thallóczy for career reasons. Thallóczy took the Croatian-Hungarian aristocratic name Talovac / Thallóczy after completing his history studies in Budapest. His first historical work was published under his German birth name Ludwig Strommer. He also graduated from the Faculty of Philosophy.

=== Albania ===
Thallóczy dealt with the history of Albania, since before World War I Austria-Hungary was significantly interested in Albania because of the political and military plans it had on Balkans and sent its scholars to investigate it. Partly because of this interest Thallóczy was employed within Austria-Hungary administration with title of court counselor to create one work on popular history of Albanians and one textbook. Together with Milan Šufflay and Konstantin Jireček he compiled the Acta et diplomata res Albaniae mediae aetatis illustrantia (English: Documents and Diplomatic Affairs illustrating the Middle Ages in Albania), a collection of archival documents about medieval Albania, primarily from the Venetian and Ragusan archives It was published in a series of volumes between 1913 and 1918.

While some circles in Italy had plans to establish closer connection of Montenegro and Northern Albanian Catholics under their leadership, Thallóczy was one of the promoters of the plans of Austria-Hungary for strengthening the otherness between them and confronting Albanians and Slavs. The aim was to counter advances of Serbia and Montenegro on Adriatic coast. In December 1897 Thallóczy stated that it is necessary to take actions to prevent population of Albania being attracted to Montenegro. According to Fan Noli Thallóczy proclaimed that opinions about Skanderbeg's Serbian descent are legends.

=== Bosnia ===
In 1884 Thallóczy was commissioned by Reich Finance Minister Benjámin Kállay to research the history of Bosnia and Herzegovina with the aim of promoting the development of a Bosnian national identity. After ten years of research, this resulted in a comprehensive collection of documents on the history of Bosnia. Thallóczy was transferred to Vienna at the request of Béni Kállay. He was put in charge of cultural and educational issues in Bosnia and Herzegovina and responsible for Bosnian affairs in the joint finance ministry.

Coat of arms of Bosnia and Herzegovina ordered in 1889 based on Thallóczy's proposal

Thallóczy became interested in heraldry in a period when scientific circles became interested to select the "right" coat of arms for Bosnia and Herzegovina. His main interests were Bosnian history, especially genealogy, heraldry and biographies of prominent individuals from its medieval period. Supported by Thallóczy's selective use of tendentiously interpreted sources aimed to satisfy the political aspirations of the empire by representing a historically connected fate of Bosnia and Herzegovina to Austria-Hungary the government imposed his proposal for the official coat of arms of Bosnia and Herzegovina in 1889. He introduced ethnically neutral yellow and red combination of colors to confront "misuse of Serbian and Croatian colors". He published numerous Cyrillic and Latin charters, and also works about the duke Hrvoje Vukčić, history of Jajce and numerous other, Bosnia-related, subjects, with the main findings published in the book Studien zur Geschichte Bosniens und Serbiens im Mittelalter, published in Munich and Leipzig in the year 1914.

=== Serbia ===
During the Austro-Hungarian occupation of Serbia of World War I, Thallóczy served as civilian commissioner of the Military General Governorate of Serbia. Thallóczy died in a train accident near Budapest while returning from the funeral of the emperor Franz Joseph I.

== Assessment ==
Thallóczy was the student and successor of Hungarian politician and historian Béni Kállay. These two historians and Istvan Burian comprised the group of Hungarian Balkanists. Lajos Thallóczy was dubbed by his contemporary researchers of the Balkans as a "mobile Balkans institute". Since 1914, he was a member of the Balkans Committee of the Hungarian Academy of Sciences. He is regarded as the academic who started modern Hungarian research of the Balkans in the assessment of his work in the period between WWI and WWII. Thallóczy's work produced important results in the studies of the south Slavic countries (Croatia, Bosnia, Serbia).

== Selected works ==
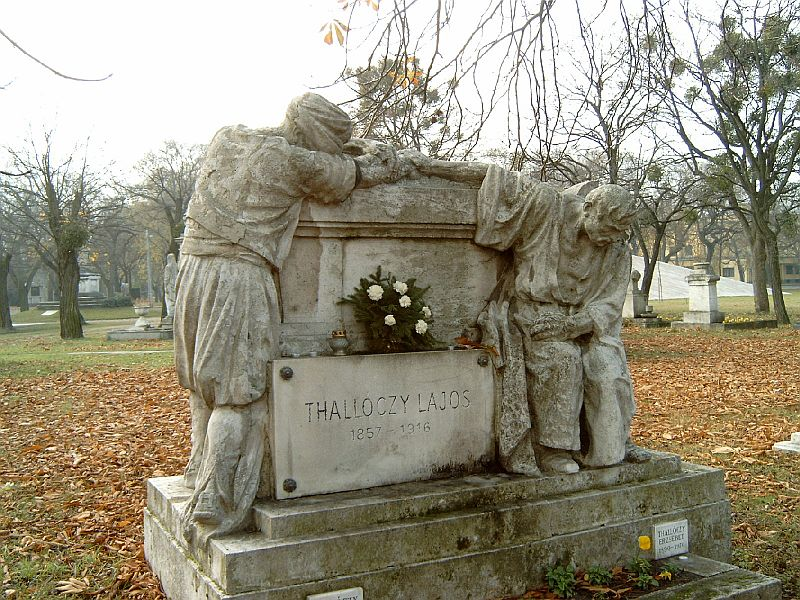
Thallóczy's grave at the Kerepesi cemetery in Budapest

- Prilozi k objašnjenju izvorâ bosanske historije (in Bosnian), Sarajevo, 1893, OCLC 41429445
- Die Geschichte der Grafen von Blagay. Von Ludwig von Thalloczy. M. 2 Stammtaf., 14 Siegel und Wappenabbild. (S. A. a. d. 8. Bde. d. "Jahrbuch der k.k. heraldischen Gesellschaft "Adler"). M. d. Portrait d. letzt. Blagay. [The History of the Counts of Blagay.] (in German), Wien: Carl Gerold's Sohn, 1898, OCLC 444453714
- Thallóczy, Lajos; Áldásy, Antal, eds. (1907). Magyarország és Szerbia közti összeköttetések oklevéltára 1198-1526. Budapest: Magyar Tudományos Akadémia.
- Thallóczy, Ludovicus; Jireček, Constantinus; Sufflay, Emilianus, eds. (1913). Acta et diplomata res Albaniae mediae aetatis illustrantia. Vol. 1. Vindobonae: Typis Adolphi Holzhausen.
- Thallóczy, Ludovicus; Jireček, Constantinus; Sufflay, Emilianus, eds. (1918). Acta et diplomata res Albaniae mediae aetatis illustrantia. Vol. 2. Vindobonae: Typis Adolphi Holzhausen.
- Studien zur Geschichte Bosniens und Serbiens im Mittelalter, 1914
- Illyrisch-albanische forschungen (in German), München, Leipzig: Duncker & Humblot, 1916, OCLC 35691167 – coauthored with Konstantin Jireček; Milan Šufflay; Theodro Anton Max Ippen; Ernst C Sedlmayr; Josef Ivanič; Imre Karácson; Béla Péch; Karl Thopia

== See also ==
- Theodor Anton Ippen
- Alfred Rappaport

== Notes ==
1. In almost all encyclopedias and works on Thallóczy is written that he was born in Buda in 1854 which was his official year of birth until his death. It was later discovered that he was in fact born in 1857 in Kassa (today in Slovakia). He himself forged his year of birth to meet the requests for getting the scholarship in Russia.

== Sources ==
=== Bibliography ===
- Elsie, Robert (2012). A Biographical Dictionary of Albanian History. London: I.B.Tauris. ISBN 978-1-780764-31-3.
- Filipović, Emir (2010), "Lajos Thallóczy i bosanska heraldika", Radovi [Works] (in Bosnian), vol. XVI/1, Sarajevo: Filozofski Fakultet u Sarajevu
- Juzbašić, Dževad; Ress, Imre; Gottsman, Andreas (2010). Lajos Thallóczy, der Historiker und Politiker: die Entdeckung der Vergangenheit von Bosnien-Herzegowina und die moderne Geschichtswissenschaft. Hungarian Academy of Sciences. ISBN 978-9639627376.
- Noli, Fan S. (1947), George Castrioti Scanderbeg (1405–1468), New York: International Universities Press, OCLC 732882
- Okey, Robin (2002). "A Trio of Hungarian Balkanists: Béni Kállay, István Burián and Lajos Thallóczy in the Age of High Nationalism". The Slavonic and East European Review. 80 (2): 234–266. doi:10.1353/see.2002.0224. JSTOR 4213438. S2CID 147783024.
- Tibor, Pal (2009), Lajoš Taloci, naučnik i političar [Ludwig Thallóczy, scientist and politician]
- Zoltán, Hajdú (2007). "Hungarian researches on the Southeast-European space (the Balkans): Continuity, interruption or permanent re-start". In Zoltán, Hajdú (ed.). Southeast-Europe: State Borders, Cross-border Relations, Spatial Structures. Centre for Regional Studies. ISBN 978-9639052659.
