= Arbëni Council =

Catholic synod in Albania in 1703

Arbeni Council
- Kuvendi i Arbënit
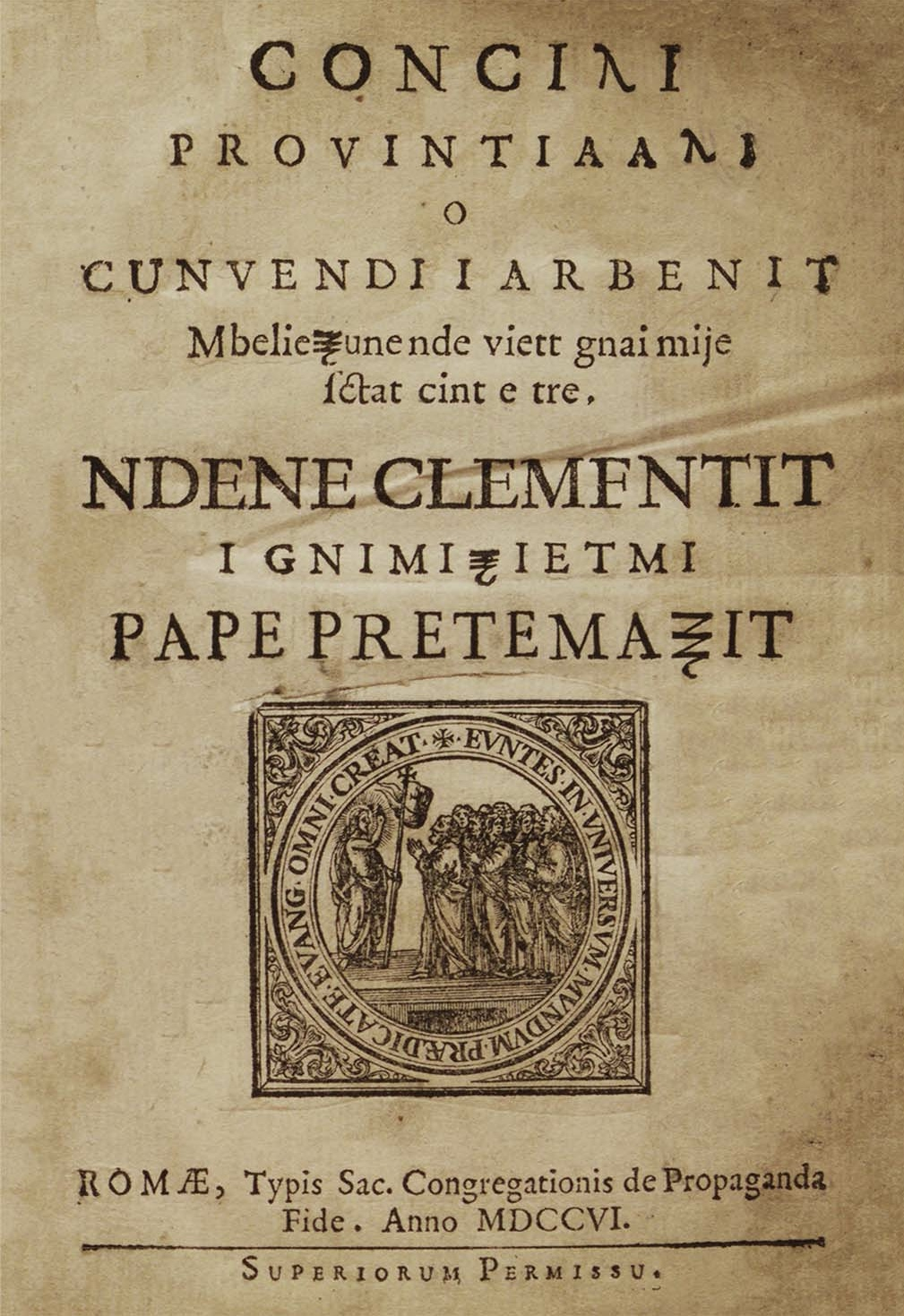
- Concilium Provinciale sive Nationale Albanum Habitum Anno M.DCCIII.
- Formation: 14 January 1703
- Purpose: To affirm the position of the Catholic Church in Albania and to stem the tide of conversions to Islam.
- Location: Mërqia, Lezhë (present day Albania)

The Arbeni Council (Albanian: Kuvendi i Arbënit) was a synod of the Catholic Church held in Mërqia, three kilometers north of present-day Lezhë, on 14–15 January 1703, to affirm the position of the Catholic Church in Albania and to stem the tide of conversions to Islam.

== Overview ==
The conference was organized during the reign of Pope Clement XI Albani (r. 1700–1721), himself of Albanian origin, and was held under the direction and in the presence of the Croatian archbishop Vincentius Zmajevich (1670–1745) of Bar, who was “apostolic visitor” of Albania, Serbia, and Macedonia. The council was attended by about 200 Catholic dignitaries to discuss the state of the Church, prevent further conversions to Islam, and settle serious property disputes among the various parishes. Both the opening speech by Zmajevich and the resolutions taken by the council were made in Albanian. The records of the meeting, which are of historical, linguistic, and ecclesiastical significance, were sent to Rome for papal inspection and published in Albanian and Latin by the Propaganda Fide in 1706, with the assistance of Francesco Maria Da Lecce O.F.M. They constitute an important source of our knowledge of the language of northern Albania in the early 18th century.

== Later Councils ==
In 1871 Archbishop of Antivar and Scutari, Carlo Pooten organised a second Albanian council. The third Albanian council was held in 1895.
