= Shëmri, Kukës =

Shëmri
- Village
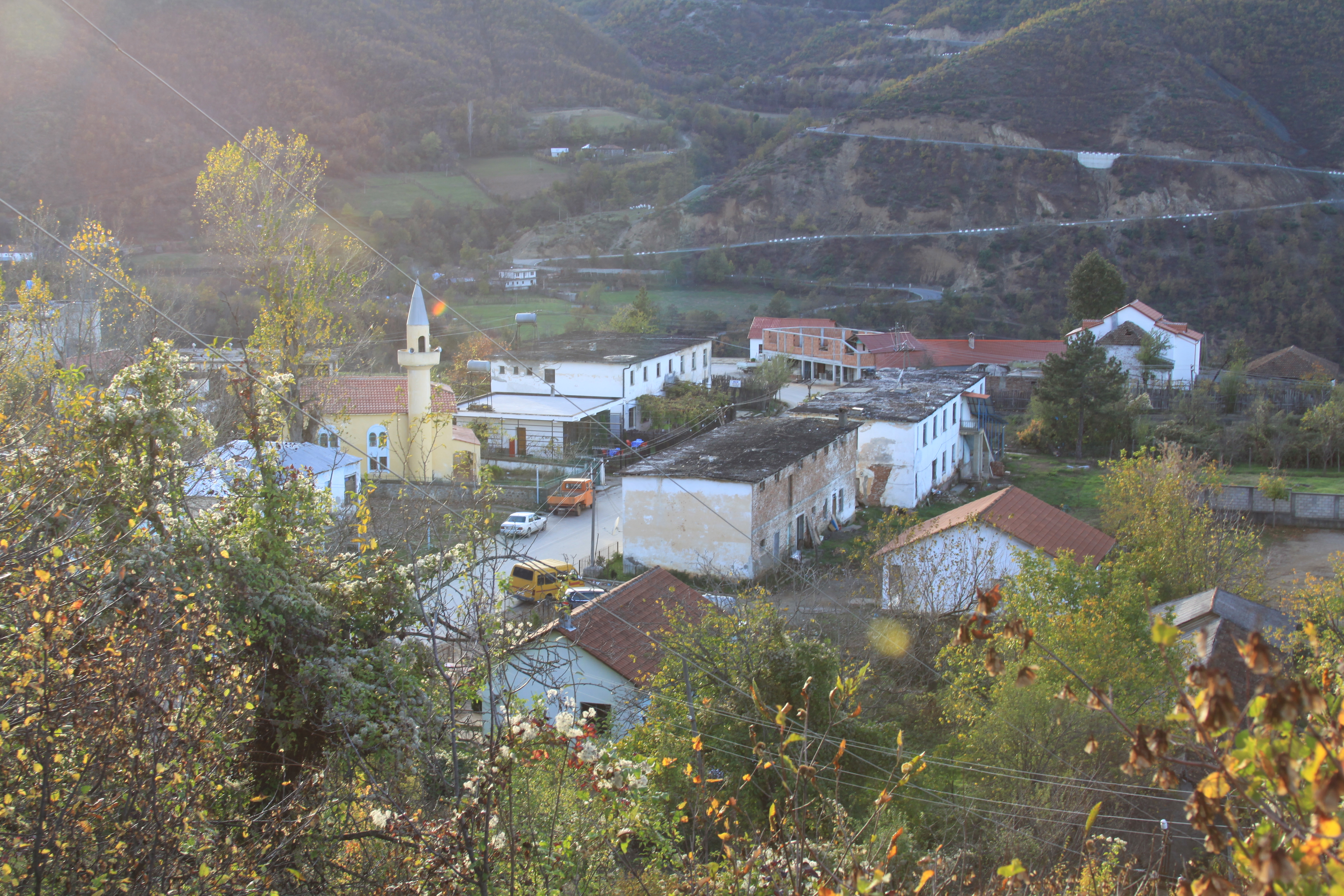
- Shëmri in 2013

- Location within Albania
- Coordinates: 42°6′N 20°14′E
- Country: Albania
- County: Kukës
- Municipality: Kukës
- Administrative unit: Malzi
- Time zone: UTC+1 (CET)
  - Summer (DST): UTC+2 (CEST)
- Postal Code: 8512

Shëmri (Albanian pronunciation: [ʃəmɾi]; Albanian definite form: Shëmria) is a village in the former municipality of Malzi in Kukës County, Albania. At the 2015 local government reform it became part of the municipality Kukës.

== Etymology ==
A church dedicated to Saint Mary existed in the village before the mid-17th century, when the Ottomans decided to destroy it. The name Shëmri is thought to derive from it, with the Albanian translation for Saint Mary being Shën Mëri.

Shëmri was recorded as Shinmiri in three different 16th-century Ottoman defters (1529–1536, 1571, and 1591), and as Shën Mëri by Frang Bardhi and Shtjefën Gaspri(sq) in June 1638 and December 1671 respectively.

From the 18th century onwards, it is recorded as Shëmri.

== Bibliography ==
- Hoxha, Shefqet (2013). Malziu (Bubrrime historike-etnologjike-folklorike-gjuhësore) (in Albanian). Mirgeeralb. ISBN 978-99280-7-196-5.
