= Milan Šufflay =

Croatian historian and politician

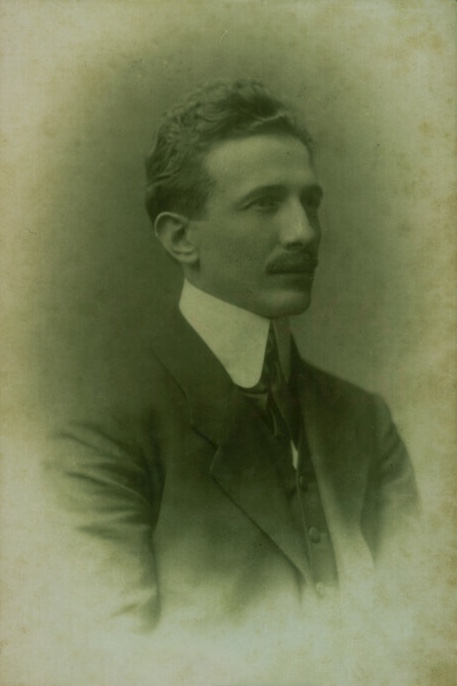
- Born: 8 November 1879; Lepoglava, Croatia-Slavonia, Austria-Hungary (now Croatia)
- Died: 19 February 1931 (aged 51); Zagreb, Kingdom of Yugoslavia (now Croatia)
- Education: University of Zagreb

Milan Šufflay (8 November 1879 – 19 February 1931) was a Croatian historian and politician. He was one of the founders of Albanology and the author of the first Croatian science fiction novel. As a Croatian nationalist, he was persecuted in the Kingdom of Yugoslavia, and his murder subsequently caused an internationally publicized affair.

== Early life ==
Šufflay was born into a lower noble family (hence pl., plemeniti, "noble", equivalent of von) in Lepoglava, in the Kingdom of Croatia-Slavonia to Augustin Šufflay (1847–190?), a teacher, and Franciska Welle von Vorstern (1847–1910), a German Hungarian from Osijek. The family coat of arms was included in Der Adel von Kroatien und Slavonien (1899) as "Sufflay de Otrussevcz". Their original surname was Sufflei or Schufflei, and their estate was Otruševec.

He attended a comprehensive high school in Zagreb and studied history at the University of Zagreb. He received a Ph.D. in 1901 from the same university with the thesis Croatia and the Last Endeavor of the Eastern Empire Under the Scepter of Three Komnenos (1075–1180). He was a brilliant student both in high school and at the university. Already during his studies, he spoke French, German, Italian, English, all the Slavic languages, as well as Latin, old Greek, and middle Greek. Later in life, he learned modern Greek, Albanian, Hebrew, and Sanskrit. Tadija Smičiklas considered Šufflay his most gifted student and took him as his assistant when editing Codex Diplomaticus of the Yugoslavian Academy of Sciences and Arts.

Šufflay became a historian of the Balkans and was convinced that the history of the Croats can only be researched properly from that perspective. This conviction clashed with the prevailing opinion of Croatian historians that the Croats were representatives of the West, as opposed to the Balkans. Ignoring the proposal of the university senate, Ban Pavao Rauch appointed him a university professor in Zagreb in 1908. However, when Nikola Tomašić, his distant cousin and enemy, became a Ban in 1910, Šufflay had to leave the university. No longer exempt from military duty as a university professor, he was drafted in early 1915 but was soon released because of illness. He wrote his most important works during this period.

== Politics ==
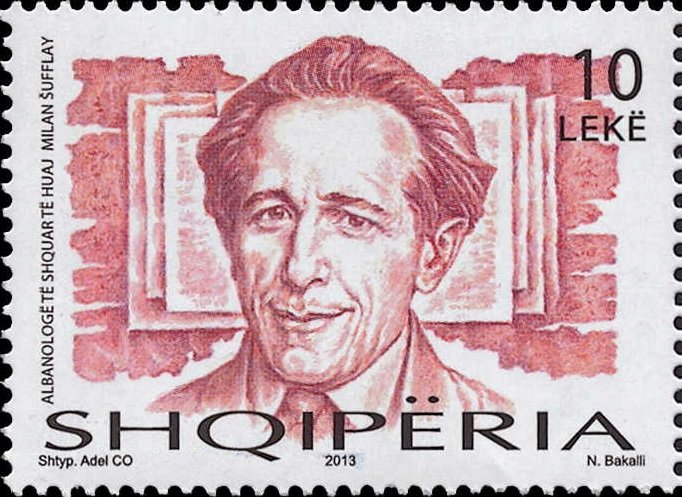
Šufflay on a 2013 stamp of Albania

In the new state, the Kingdom of Serbs, Croats and Slovenes, he was arrested for high treason and charged with spying for a foreign power (through links with the Croatian Committee) together with Ivo Pilar, another Croatian historian. Their defense lawyer was Ante Pavelić, at the time a leader of the Pure Party of Rights and an associate of Šufflay. Šufflay was sentenced to three and a half years in prison. The reaction to the sentence was stronger abroad than in Croatia, as scientific colleagues from numerous countries tried to obtain his release but without success. He did his time in the Sremska Mitrovica prison. After serving over half of his sentence, he was released from prison in 1922 and he returned to his scientific work.

In 1924, Šufflay wrote his first science fiction novel, On the Pacific in 2255, which is considered the first Croatian science fiction novel. In that same year Šufflay became a member of the leadership of the Pure Party of Rights, a rightwing Croatian political party inspired by the work of Josip Frank, a fervent nationalist. One of the most important characteristics of the Frank's followers was their anti-Serb position. The party had reportedly not managed to win more than a few seats in the 300-strong legislative.

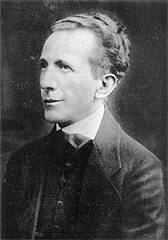
Sufflay

In 1928, when Stjepan Radić was assassinated in the Yugoslav parliament, a year before king Alexander I would establish his dictatorship, Šufflay wrote Hrvatska u svijetlu svjetske historije i politike (Croatia in the Light of World History and Politics). He wrote that the Croatian people was suffering under the Yugoslav dictatorship and that it had to free itself. He claimed that the border between Western and the Eastern Civilisations lay on the Drina river, the "destined borderline on the Drina river on which the mighty Roman Empire snapped into two... a border both spiritual and cultural". Šufflay's idea about the delineation on the Drina river would later influence Greater Croatian irredentism.

The Croatian people have passed through the Roman-Western retort, while the Serbian people passed through the Byzantine-Turkish. Therefore the psyche of the two peoples is essentially different, even if the languages are similar. Unification of the two peoples would mean neutralization and careful constraining. To centralize here would mean to make Croatia a guinea pig for vivisection experiments. It is my thesis that the Croatian nation, as a citizen of the great empire of the western civilization, has the right to raise its voice against any oppression.

Those who know history know that the Yugoslav idea has no dynamics. It is nothing compared to the mighty Croatian idea. In Croatia, the Yugoslav idea is a shallow wreckage under which the Croatian national volcano boils; only a subtle push is necessary to make it erupt.

To me personally, as a philosopher and an open-minded Croat, it is the same whether I sit shackled at the court or a penitentiary, or whether I get out into the false freedom hiding the larger dungeon in which – thank God, only temporarily! – the Croatian nation is suffering!

— Milan Sufflay

In 1928, he was appointed a professor at the University of Budapest, but he could not take the job because he did not hold a passport.

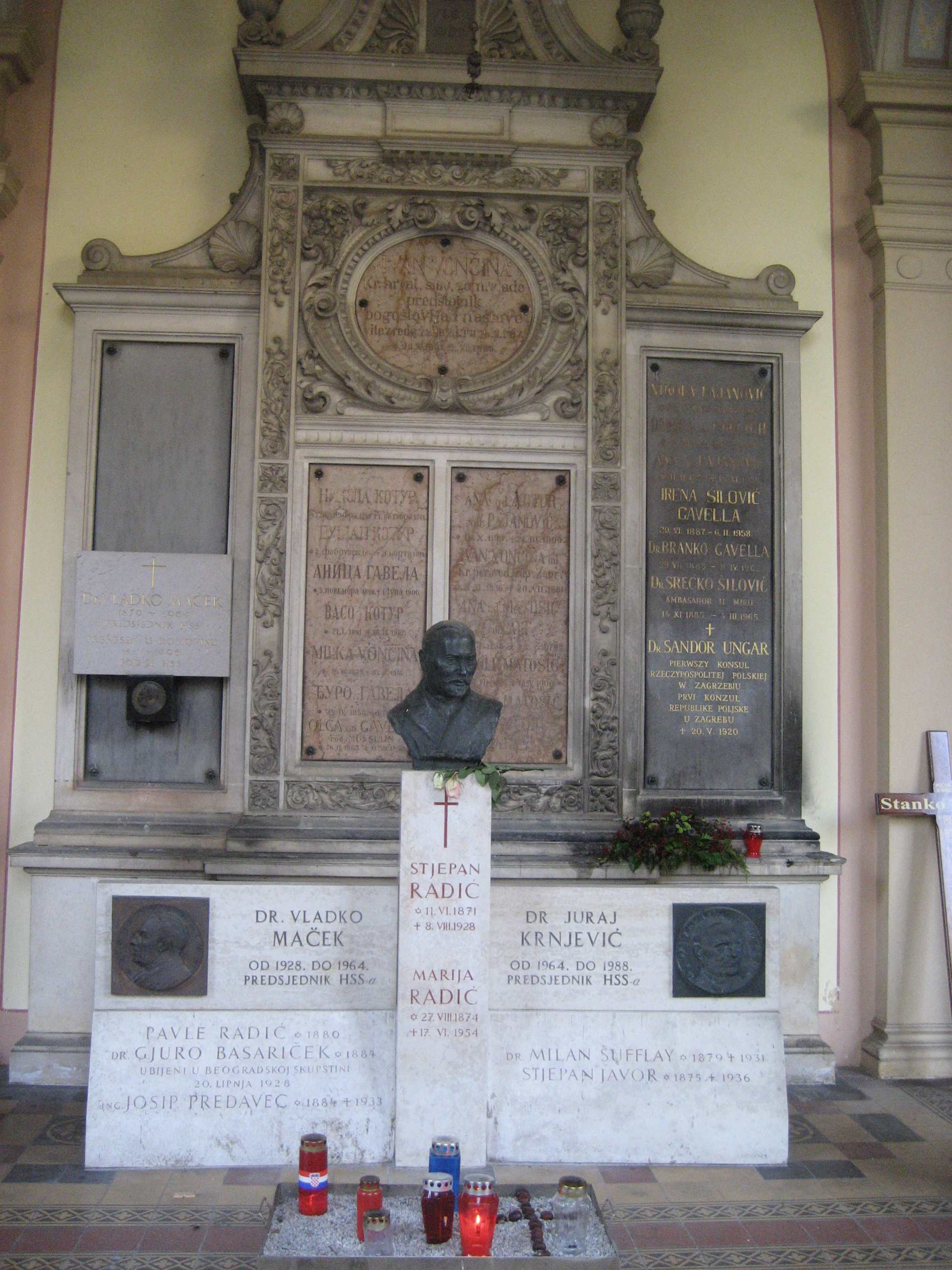
The shared grave of Stjepan Radic, Milan Sufflay, and their fellow leaders of the Peasant Party in the Mirogoj Cemetery in Zagreb

On the request of the Albanian government and the Academy of Sciences in Vienna, he continued the work of Jireček and Thalloczy, editing the 3rd book of Codex albanicus, an archival collection. In 1931, he finally obtained a passport and travelled to Albania to sign a contract to work on Acta Albaniae.

== Murder ==
Members of the regime organisation, Young Yugoslavia, under royal protection, ambushed him at his doorstep in Zagreb and broke his skull with an iron rod, killing him. Then, they broke into his apartment and took the manuscript of the third book of Codex albanicus. There was never any investigation about the criminals. The authorities denied any knowledge of the assailants and banned activities related to Šufflay's funeral.

Albert Einstein and Heinrich Mann sent a letter to the International League for Human Rights in Paris appealing to the global cultural public to protest against the murder of Šufflay and appealing for protection of Croatian people from the oppression of Yugoslavian regime. The appeal was addressed to the Paris-based Ligue des droits de l'homme (Human Rights League) and made the front page of the New York Times on 6 May 1931. It accused the king of complicity in the crime.

In June 1940, in the Banovina of Croatia, a trial was organized for Šufflay's murder.

== Works ==
- Hrvatska i zadnja pregnuća istočne imperije pod žezlom triju Komnena (Croatia and the Last Efforts of the Eastern Empire under Three Comnenuses, 1901)
- Die Dalmatinische Privaturkunde (Dalmatian Private Deeds, 1904)
- Thallóczy, Ludovicus; Jireček, Constantinus; Sufflay, Emilianus, eds. (1913). Acta et diplomata res Albaniae mediae aetatis illustrantia. Vol. 1. Vindobonae: Typis Adolphi Holzhausen.
- Thallóczy, Ludovicus; Jireček, Constantinus; Sufflay, Emilianus, eds. (1918). Acta et diplomata res Albaniae mediae aetatis illustrantia. Vol. 2. Vindobonae: Typis Adolphi Holzhausen.
- Kostadin Balšić (1392–1401): historijski roman u 3 dijela (Kostadin Balšić: A Historical Novel in Three Parts, 1920)
- Srbi i Arbanasi (Serbs and Albanians, 1925)
- Na Pacifiku god. 2255.: metagenetički roman u četiri knjige (On the Pacific in 2255: A Metagenetic Novel in Four Books, first printed as a book in 1998)
- Hrvatska u svijetlu svjetske historije i politike : dvanaest eseja (Croatia in the Light of World History and Politics: Twelve Essays, 1928, reprinted in 1999)
- Hrvati u sredovječnom svjetskom viru (Croats in the Global Medieval Upheaval, 1931)
- Izabrani eseji, prikazi i članci (Selected Essays, Criticisms and Articles, 1999)
- Izabrani eseji, rasprave, prikazi, članci i korespondencija (Selected Essays, Discussions, Criticisms, Articles and Correspondence, 1999)
- Izabrani politički spisi (Selected Political Works, published by Stoljeća hrvatske književnosti, 2000)

== Sources ==
- Horvat, Josip (1965). Hrvatski panoptikum. Stvarnost. pp. 173–174.
- Nemec, Krešimir (1998). "Prvi hrvatski science-fiction" (PDF). Croatica (in Croatian). 27 (45–46): 337–346.
