= Alfred Rappaport (diplomat) =

Austrian diplomat

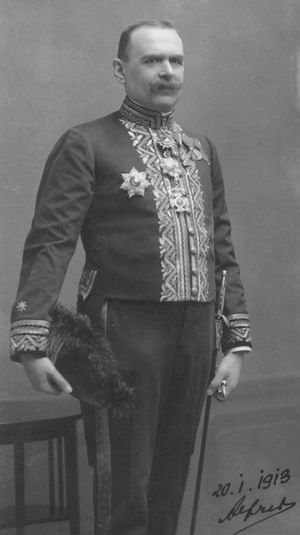
- Alfred Rappaport (1913)
- Born: 16 June 1868
- Died: 11 October 1946 (aged 78)
- Citizenship: Austria-Hungary, Austria

Alfred Rappaport (16 June 1868 – 11 October 1946) was an Austrian diplomat and writer. Rappaport was considered an authority on Balkans and Albanian affairs in the foreign ministry of Austria-Hungary. For his services he was ennobled by Franz Joseph I in 1916 and became known as Alfred Rappaport, Ritter von Arbengau. After the fall of the Austro-Hungarian Empire he retired and focused on publishing his works on the Balkans.

== Life ==
Born the son of Eugen Rappaport, an Austrian Jewish businessman, Alfred converted to Roman Catholicism in 1883 and in 1900 joined the Oriental Academy. In 1893 he joined the staff of the Austro-Hungarian consulate of Shkodër and in October 1895 became vice-consul under Theodore Ippen. In Shkodër Rappaport learned Albanian and associated himself with Franz Nopcsa. From 1897 to 1899 he headed the vice-consulate of Prizren and from 1900 to 1903 the consulate of Baghdad. In 1904 he was reassigned to the Balkans as consul general of Skopje. In 1909 he was recalled to Vienna by Count Alois Lexa von Aehrenthal and became director of the Albanian department and deputy director of the Oriental one.

On 15 March 1916, Emperor Franz Joseph I. ennobled him with the title of Ritter and allowed him to add a place name to his surname, which was then a standard procedure in Austria. As part of the process, Rappaport was invited by the authorities to propose a coat of arms and three place names from which one would be chosen. The three choices Rappaport submitted were Arward ("of Vardar"), Drineck ("of Drin"), and Arbengau (deriving from the Latin term Arbanum for the Albanian people and gau, a country subdivision used by Germanic-speaking peoples). As the first two were already in use by other noble families, the authorities chose Arbengau.

After the First World War Rappaport was one of the few former leading diplomats of the foreign ministry that were initially employed by the Republic of Austria as director of the political department. However, during the reforms of 1920 and 1921, when the Republic had to drastically reduce the number of people employed in the public sector, he was retired.

== Honours ==
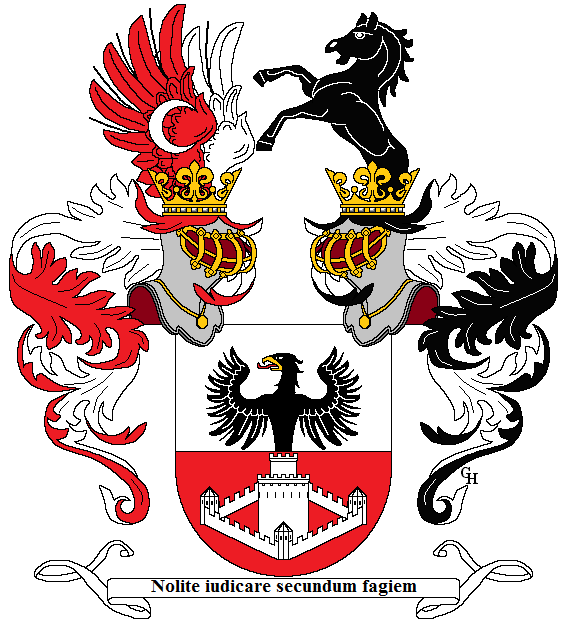
Rappaport von Arbengau's coat of arms, granted in 1916.

- Order of Franz Joseph (November 30, 1898)
- Order of the Iron Crown of Austria, 3rd class (February 22, 1907)
- Order of the Medjidie
- Order of Osmanieh (2nd class)
- Order of Prince Danilo I (3d class)
- Order of the Crown of Prussia
- Order of St. Gregory the Great
- Order of the Crown of Italy (2nd class)
- Order of the Black Eagle
