= Konstantin Jireček =

Czech historian (1854–1918)

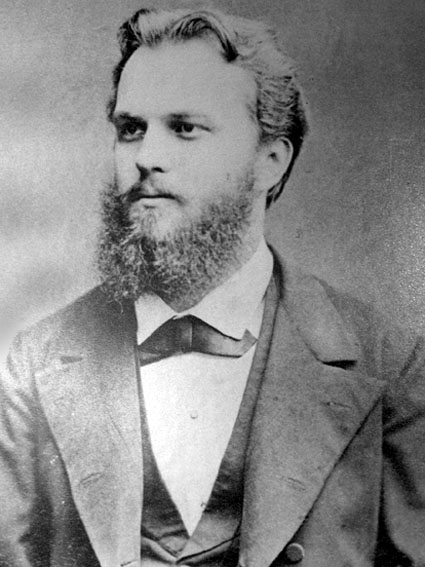
- Born: 24 July 1854; Vienna, Austrian Empire
- Died: 10 January 1918 (aged 63); Vienna, Austria-Hungary
- Citizenship: Austria-Hungary, Bulgaria
- Parent(s): Josef Jireček (1825–1888) and Božena Šafárik
- Relatives: Pavol Jozef Šafárik (maternal grandfather)
- Family: Jireček

Konstantin Josef Jireček (Note: Bulgarian: Константин Иречек) (24 July 1854 – 10 January 1918) was an Austro-Hungarian Czech historian, politician, diplomat, and Slavist. He was the founder of Bohemian Balkanology (or Balkan Studies) and Byzantine studies, and wrote extensively on Bulgarian and Serbian history. Jireček was also a minister in the government of the Principality of Bulgaria for a couple of years.

== Life ==
Jireček was the son of Czech historian Josef Jireček (1825–1888) and Božena, a daughter of Slovak philologist Pavel Jozef Šafárik (1795–1861). His family was deeply involved in Slavistics.

Jireček was raised in Vienna and enrolled in the 1864–1872 period at Theresianum, a prestigious preparatory school in Vienna. During his education, he became very interested in and studied several foreign languages (French, Serbo-Croatian, Bulgarian, Italian, Russian, English, Hungarian, Turkish and Greek). In 1872, he became a student at the Philological Faculty at the University of Prague, where he studied history and modern philology. At this time, his nearest friends included French historian Ernest Denis (1849–1921) and the sons of Bulgarian theatre director and actor Krastyo Pishurka. In 1874, he took a study trip to Croatia-Slavonia and Serbia, after which he published several essays on the history and traditions of the South Slavic countries.

In 1876, he had his first book published, the History of the Bulgarians, a historiographical work spanning the medieval Bulgarian state foundation to the Ottoman conquest, which attracted great attention to the 22-year-old historian. This was due to the European public's interest in the April Uprising of the Bulgarian people, a people little known in Europe at the time. For his dissertation on the history of the Bulgarians, Jireček was awarded the title of doctor in philosophy in 1876. In 1877, his habilitation work was divided between Constantinople and Belgrade (Serbia).

After the end of the Russo-Turkish War (1877–1878), which saw the re-establishment of the Bulgarian state, he helped construct the administration, school system and economy in the newly founded Principality of Bulgaria. In 1879, he was employed by the Bulgarian government, and from May to July 1881 he served as Minister of Foreign Affairs, then until 1882 as Minister of Science. In 1884, he was appointed director of the National Library in Sofia. During his stay, he devoted himself to research in Balkanology and Byzantine Studies. He published his results in numerous studies and monographs. Overall Konstantin Jireček made significant contributions to the establishment of a modern educational system and overall social change in Bulgaria in the first years after the creation of the modern state in 1878.

From 1884 to 1893, he taught universal history as a full professor at the Charles University in Prague. After that, he was a professor of Slavic philology at the University of Vienna until his death in 1918. Carl Patsch succeeded the office at Vienna.

== Work ==
The bulk of Jireček's writings deal with the history of the South Slavs and their literature. They notably include a History of the Bulgarians (Czech and German, 1876), History of Serbs, The Principality of Bulgaria (1891), Travels in Bulgaria (Czech, 1888), etc. He mostly wrote in German.

- History of the Bulgarians (Czech: Dějiny bulharského národa; German: Geschichte der Bulgaren), published in Prague in 1876
- Die altböhmischen Gedichte der Grünberger und Königinhofer. Handschrift im Urtexte und in deutscher Uebersetzung. Prag: Rivnac, 1879.
- Die Handelsstrassen und Bergwerke von Serbien und Bosnien während des Mittelalters: historisch-geographische Studien. Prag: Verlag der Königlich Böhmischen Gesellschaft der Wissenschaften, 1879
- Einige Bemerkungen über die Überreste der Petschenegen und Kumanen sowie über die Völkerschaften der sogenannten Gagauzi und Surguči im heutigen Bulgarien. Prag: Verlag der Königlich Böhmischen Gesellschaft der Wissenschaften, 1889.
- Die Heerstrasse von Belgrad nach Constantinopel und die Balkanpässe. Prag: Tempsky, 1877.
- Das Fürstentum Bulgarien, seine Bodengestaltung, Natur, Bevölkerung, wirthschaftliche Zustände, geistige Cultur; mit 42 Abbildungen und einer Karte. Prag, Wien, Leipzig: Tempsky, Freytag. 1891 – via Internet Archive.
- Poselství republiky Dubrovnické k císařovně Kateřině v roce 1771. Prag, 1893.
- Das christliche Element in der topographischen Nomenclatur der Balkanländer. Wien: Gerold, 1897
- Bogišić, Valtazar; Jireček, Constantine (1904). Liber statorum civitatis Ragusii compositus anno 1272. Zagreb – via Internet Archive.
- Staat und Gesellschaft im mittelalterlichen Serbien. Studien zur Kulturgeschichte des 13.-15. Jahrhunderts. Wien 1912 (Fotomechanischer Nachdruck Leipzig: Zentralantiquariat der DDR, 1974)
- Jireček, Constantin (1911). Geschichte der Serben. Vol. 1. Gotha: Perthes. (Nachdruck Amsterdam: Hakkert, 1967)
- Jireček, Constantin (1918). Geschichte der Serben. Vol. 2. Gotha: Perthes. (Nachdruck Amsterdam: Hakkert, 1967)
- Thallóczy, Ludovicus; Jireček, Constantinus; Sufflay, Emilianus, eds. (1913). Acta et diplomata res Albaniae mediae aetatis illustrantia. Vol. 1. Vindobonae: Typis Adolphi Holzhausen.
- Thallóczy, Ludovicus; Jireček, Constantinus; Sufflay, Emilianus, eds. (1918). Acta et diplomata res Albaniae mediae aetatis illustrantia. Vol. 2. Vindobonae: Typis Adolphi Holzhausen.

== A Quote ==
"We, the unwilling, led by the unknowing, are doing the impossible for the ungrateful. We have done so much, for so long, with so little, we are now qualified to do anything with nothing."

== Honours ==
Jireček Point on Smith Island in the South Shetland Islands, Antarctica is named after Jireček. In Bulgaria, Mount Jireček, the third highest peak of the Rila mountain range, as well as two villages, also bear his name.

A journal of the Serbian Academy of Sciences and Arts bears his name (Serbian Cyrillic: Зборник Константина Јиречека). Also, streets in Novi Sad and Belgrade are named Jirečekova after him.

== In fiction ==
Jireček appears as a minor character in one of Aleko Konstantinov's satirical feuilletons centred on the fictional character of Bay Ganyo where the protagonist visits him in Prague, looking for shelter and discussing politics.

== See also ==
- Jireček Line

== Sources ==
- Stadtmüller, Georg (1976) [1950]. Geschichte Südosteuropas. Oldenbourg.
- L. Léger (1923). Neue österreichische Biographie 1815–1918. Wien. pp. 103–108.
- Jagić, Vatroslav (1895). "Константин Јиречек". СКА. 8: 176–184.
- "Константин Јиречек". OSN. 13: 546. 1898.
- "Константин Иречек". 100 години БАН 1869–1969, т. 1. София: 274–276. 1969.
- Radojčić, N. "Константин Јиречек". BLGS. 2: 267–269.
- Rehder, Р. "Konstantin Jireček". Kudĕlka. pp. 205–209.
- Šimeček, Z. (1962). "Konstantin Jireček". ÖBL. 12: 116–117.
- Mihaljčić, Rade. "Константин Јиречек". КМЕ. 2: 118–120.
- Miltenova, A. (1905). Б. Цвътковичъ и Й. Наги: ТрудоветЪ на проф. Д-ръ К. J. Иречека. София.
- Nachev, Ivaylo. Konstantin Jireček and the Outset of Modern Institutions in Bulgaria, 1879–84. In: Transforming Southeast Europe During the Long 19th Century Persons and Personalities.
