= Fan, Mirditë =

Fan
- Administrative unit
- Location within Albania
- Coordinates: 41°56′N 20°9′E
- Country: Albania
- County: Lezhë
- Municipality: Mirditë

Population (2023)
  - Administrative unit: 1,585
- Time zone: UTC+1 (CET)
  - Summer (DST): UTC+2 (CEST)

Fan is a village and a former municipality in the Lezhë County, northwestern Albania. At the 2015 local government reform it became a subdivision of the municipality Mirditë. The population at the 2023 census was 1,585.
