= Ivan Jastrebov =

Russian diplomat

Ivan Stepanovich Jastrebov
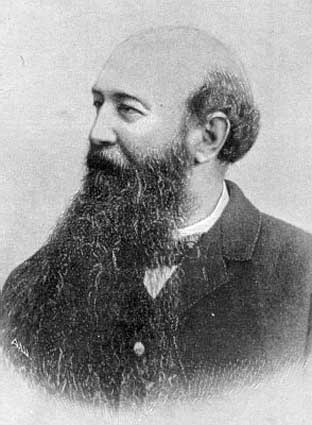

Personal details
- Born: January 27, 1839 Tambov Governorate, Russian Empire (modern-day Russia)
- Died: January 8, 1894 (aged 54) Thessaloniki, Ottoman Empire (modern-day Greece)
- Profession: Diplomat

Ivan Stepanovich Yastrebov (Russian: Иван Степанович Ястребов, Serbian: Иван Степанович Јастребов/Ivan Stepanovič Jastrebov; 1839–1894) was a Russian diplomat, historian, and ethnographer. Through his diplomatic activity, he protected Serbs in Kosovo, trying to prevent their emigration and de-Serbization.

== Life ==
Yastrebov was born in 1839 in the village of Gromushka, in the Tambov Governorate, into a priestly family. He was educated in Astrakhan, which at that time was a business and cultural center of the Russian Empire, and the connection to Middle Asia as a melting pot of European and Asian influence. He later studied at the seminary in Kazan, where he spent some years and finished as a student, having learned the classical languages. His admission to the department for the Study of Eastern languages defined his decision to work in diplomacy.

On 1 January 1866, he was appointed a diplomat in the Russian delegate in the Ottoman capital, Istanbul, where he stayed for a year, with the rank of vežbaonik. At this time, Russia played the role of protector of the Orthodox population in the Ottoman Empire. On 1 January 1867 he was appointed the secretary and translator in the Russian Consulate in the Scutari Vilayet. The consulate was established in order to counter the influence of the Austrian and French consulates. He was the Vice-Consul, seated in Prizren, from 1 April 1870 to 18 August 1874. During that period, at times, he replaced the Russian Consul in Scutari, and on 5 August 1874 was moved to Scutari as a Consul. After a year, he became a member of Andriyashev's consulate commission (on 17 August 1875) for the Sanjak of Herzegovina, until his return to Prizren as Russian Consul on 1 July 1879; he was a witness to the armed conflicts resulting from interests between Russia and Austria-Hungary. After Prizren, he worked in the Sanjak of Ioanninna since 6 September 1880, and returned to Prizren 20 February 1881, staying until March 1886. He was then moved to the General Consulate in Thessaloniki.

He died on 8 January 1894 in Thessaloniki, where he was buried.

== Work ==
During his diplomatic service, he wrote many studies on the regions where he stayed, for which he received a great accolade from scientific institutions, not only from Russia but from the Balkan states as well, and he also received a variety of awards and other recognitions.

- Demographic study of the Sanjak of Scutari, 1874, Belgrade
- ("Customs and Songs of the Turkish Serbs"), 1886, St. Petersburg
- Stara Srbija i Albanija ("Old Serbia and Albania"), 1904, Belgrade

In 1879 Russian consul in Montenegro, Yastrebov, published his notes about his visit to Shkodër, which also included visit to ruins of Baleč. Jastrebov described the ruins of two Orthodox churches in Baleč, whose ruins belonged to the territory of Rioli tribe.

Jastrebov was first to record a song, in Macedonian region of Debar, about the conflict between Prince Marko and Korun Aramija (Marko and the Highland Fighter Korun).

He was awarded Serbian Order of Saint Sava and other decorations.

== Sources ==
- Folić, Milutin (1991), "Izveštaji ruskog konzula Ivana Stepanoviča Jastrebova iz Skadra o slovenskom življu i njihovim crkvama u Albaniji u drugoj polovini XIX veka", Stanovništvo slovenskog porijekla u Albaniji : zbornik radova sa međunarodnog naučnog skupa održanog u Cetinju 21, 22. i 23. juna 1990 (in Serbian), Titograd: Istorijski institut SR Crne Gore; Stručna knj., OCLC 29549273
