= Gora (region) =

Coordinates: 41.978°N 20.657°E

Gora Гора
- Geographical and historical region
- Gora (green) and adjacent area in Polog (yellow) that is culturally and linguistically associated with the core region
- Countries: Albania; Kosovo; North Macedonia

Area
  - Estimate: 500 km^{2} (190 sq mi)

Population
  - Estimate (2011): 40,000
  - Density: 80/km^{2} (210/sq mi)

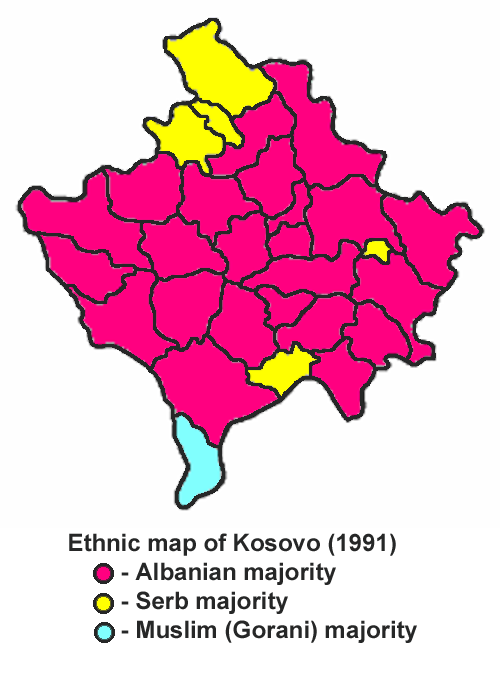
Former Gora municipality in Kosovo, marked in blue

Gora (Cyrillic: Гора; Albanian: Gorë) is a geographical region in southern Kosovo and northeastern Albania, primarily inhabited by the Gorani people. Due to geopolitical circumstances, some of the local Gorani people have over time also self declared themselves as Albanians, Macedonians, Bosniaks, Bulgarians, Serbs, Turks and Muslims by ethnicity.

Gorani inhabited settlements in Albania and Kosovo are synonymous with the geographical outline of Gora as a region. Between 1992 and 1999, the Gora region in Kosovo was designated as a municipality, and its population was 17,574 people according to the 1991 census. Today in Kosovo, the region is part of Dragash municipality that includes the Albanian inhabited Opoja region. In Albania, the Gora region is located in Kukës County and parts of it are subdivided in the Shishtavec and Zapod territorial units. Nearby, two Gorani settlements geographically located in the Polog region of North Macedonia are ethnographically and linguistically associated with the Gora region.

Gora is bordered to the west and northwest by the region of Lumë, which is mostly within Albania and a small portion in Kosovo. In the northeast it is bordered by the regions of Opoja, to the east by Polog and to the south by Upper Reka.

"Gora" means "mountain" in Slavic. It is part of Šar Mountains.

== Geographical distribution ==
=== Albania ===
The region of Gora within Albania contains 9 Gorani inhabited villages: Zapod, Pakisht, Orçikël, Kosharisht, Cernalevë, Orgjost, Oreshkë, Borje and Shishtavec.

According to the 2011 Albanian census, just over two-thirds of the population in the then-existing Shishtavec Municipality identified as Albanian, while 7.7% identified as Macedonian. In the then-existing Zapod Municipality, 79% identified as Albanian and 11.7% identified as Macedonian.

According to the 2023 Albanian census (no settlement-level data available yet), the first one where a Bulgarian minority was officially recognised by the Albanian government, a total of 2,174 people self-identified as Bulgarian in the Kukës County. At the same time, the population of the two Gorani-inhabited administrative units of Zapod and Shishtavec stood at 3,671 in 9 Gorani and 5 Albanian villages. Only 5 residents of the entire Kukës County self-identified as Macedonians.

=== Kosovo ===
The region of Gora within Kosovo is made up of 18 Gorani inhabited villages: Baćka, Brod, Vranište, Globočice, Gornja Rapča, Gornji Krstac, Dikance, Donja Rapča, Donji Krstac, Zli Potok, Kruševo, Kukaljane, Lještane, Ljubošta, Mlike, Orčuša, Radeša, Restelicë and the town of Dragash. Following 1999, Dragash has a mixed population of Gorani, whom live in the lower neighbourhood and Albanians in the upper neighbourhood that constitute the majority of inhabitants.

According to 1991 census data, the population of Dragash municipality was composed of:

- Albanians: 22,785
- Gorani: 16,129

The Gora municipality and Opoja region remained separated during the Milošević period. After the 1999 Kosovo war, the Gorani-majority Gora municipality was merged with the Albanian inhabited Opoja region to form the municipality of Dragash by the United Nations Mission (UNMIK) and the new administrative unit has an Albanian majority. The town of Dragash is the regional and municipal centre for both the Gora and Opoja regions of Dragash municipality.

Kosovo's Gorani people have stated that they want the former Gora municipality with a Gorani majority that was merged with the Albanian-majority Opolje to form the Dragash municipality which has an Albanian majority) to join the Community of Serb municipalities. On 3 November 2013, 70% voted in favour of establishing the Gora municipality as part of the Community of Serb municipalities, according to Gorani political leader Safet Kuši.

=== North Macedonia ===
In the Republic of North Macedonia, there are two Gorani inhabited villages within Bogovinje Municipality: Jelovjane and Urvič located in the Polog region that neighbours the Gora region. During the Macedonian census of 2001, the population of Jelovjane self declared as Turks (90%) while Urvič self declared as Turks (85%) and Albanians (15%).
