= Havzi Nela =

Albanian poet

- Havzi Nela
- Born: 20 February 1934; Kollovoz, Albania
- Died: 10 August 1988 (aged 54); Kukës, Albania
- Cause of death: Execution by hanging
- Occupations: School teacher and poet
- Known for: Poems against the Albanian communist regime

Death penalty signed by Communist Albania by Ramiz Alia and Kristaq Rama, the father of the today's Prime Minister Edi Rama.

Havzi Nela (20 February 1934 – 10 August 1988) was an Albanian teacher and poet who was publicly hanged in 1988, in the waning years of the Hoxha dictatorship, for his dissident poetry and advocacy. After the fall of communism in Albania, Nela was named a "Martyr of Democracy."

== Life ==
Nela was born in the village of Kollovoz in the district of Kukës. He managed to finish both elementary and high school while living in extreme poverty. In high school he began objecting to what he saw as injustices committed by the communist regime. After this, he began studies at the Higher Pedagogical Institute of Shkodër (today's Luigj Gurakuqi University), but was expelled due to his dissident beliefs. After much difficulty, he found a job as an elementary school teacher in Plani i Bardhë, a small village in the district of Mat, but was forced to quit due to suspicious activity. The suspicion arose after students began reading his poetry. He then went on to study at the Higher Pedagogical Institute of Shkodër by correspondence. He worked as a teacher in different towns and villages such as Krumë, Lojmë (in the administrative unit of Zapod) and Shishtavec until 1967, when he moved to Topojan.

Havzi Nela was constantly under surveillance and was often taken into custody. His writings were censored heavily and his movements were restricted. After his students read the poem "Shko dallandyshe" (Be Off, Swallow) written by Filip Shiroka, Havzi Nela and his wife, Lavdie, were under threat of prosecution from the government due to its controversial content. They risked their lives by taking the journey over the border into Kosovo, Yugoslavia on 26 April 1967. While crossing the frontier he wrote on a piece of paper; "Goodbye, dear homeland, for I leave with a broken heart", (Lamtumirë atdhe i dashur, se po iki zemërplasur). He placed the piece of paper in the branch of a hazel tree. It is widely believed that the purpose of this was to declare an undying love for the country and its people while expressing disdain for its dictatorship. In Kosovo, he and his wife were captured just beyond the border. They were arrested and imprisoned in the city of Prizren. On 6 May 1967, the Yugoslav government exchanged Nela and his wife for several Yugoslav prisoners held in Albania. The exchange took place at the Morinë border crossing.

On 22 May 1967, Nela was tried and sentenced by the courts of Kukës County to fifteen years in prison on charges of betrayal and desertion of his country, serious offences under the regime of Albania's Communist leader Enver Hoxha. His wife was sentenced to ten years in prison. She was offered a shorter sentence if she would forsake and divorce her husband, but she refused and accepted her punishment. Nela was imprisoned in the Burrel and, later, Spaç Prison.

On 8 August 1975, eight years were added to Nela's sentence because he helped organise and lead an uprising in the prison, directed against the regime and appalling prison conditions. On 19 December 1986, he was finally released, but was strictly confined to the village of Arrën. Less than a year later, on 12 October 1987, news came that his mother was dying, so he left Arrën to see her one last time. This was discovered immediately by the government and Nela was again arrested.

Soon after, he was sentenced to death by hanging. On 24 June 1988, the communist judges of the Supreme Court of Albania, consisting of Fehmi Abdiu, Vili and Fatmira Laskaj Robo rejected Lavdie Nela's appeal of her husband's death sentence. Among the signers of the death warrant were Ramiz Alia and Kristaq Rama, the father of Albania's current prime minister, Edi Rama. On August 10, 1988, at 02:00 am, Nela was hanged in the middle of the town of Kukës. His body was left publicly exposed the whole day, communist officials removing it at midnight and dropping it, at an undisclosed location, into a vertical hole created by the removal of a wooden pole. His body remained there for five years and ten days, until 20 August 1993, when, after numerous attempts by the post-communist government of Albania, the burial site was found in an area covered with rocks and bushes near Kolsh, two kilometres from Kukës.

By decree of Albanian president Sali Berisha, Havzi Nela was given the title Martyr of Democracy. In 2009, the 75th anniversary of Nela's birth, prominent writer Ismail Kadare wrote: "The poet Havzi Nela is a bell that still rings for Albanian society. Not to listen to it is to continue to be trampled on by the foot of the oppressor."
