= Shishtavec =

Shishtavec Шиштавец
- Village
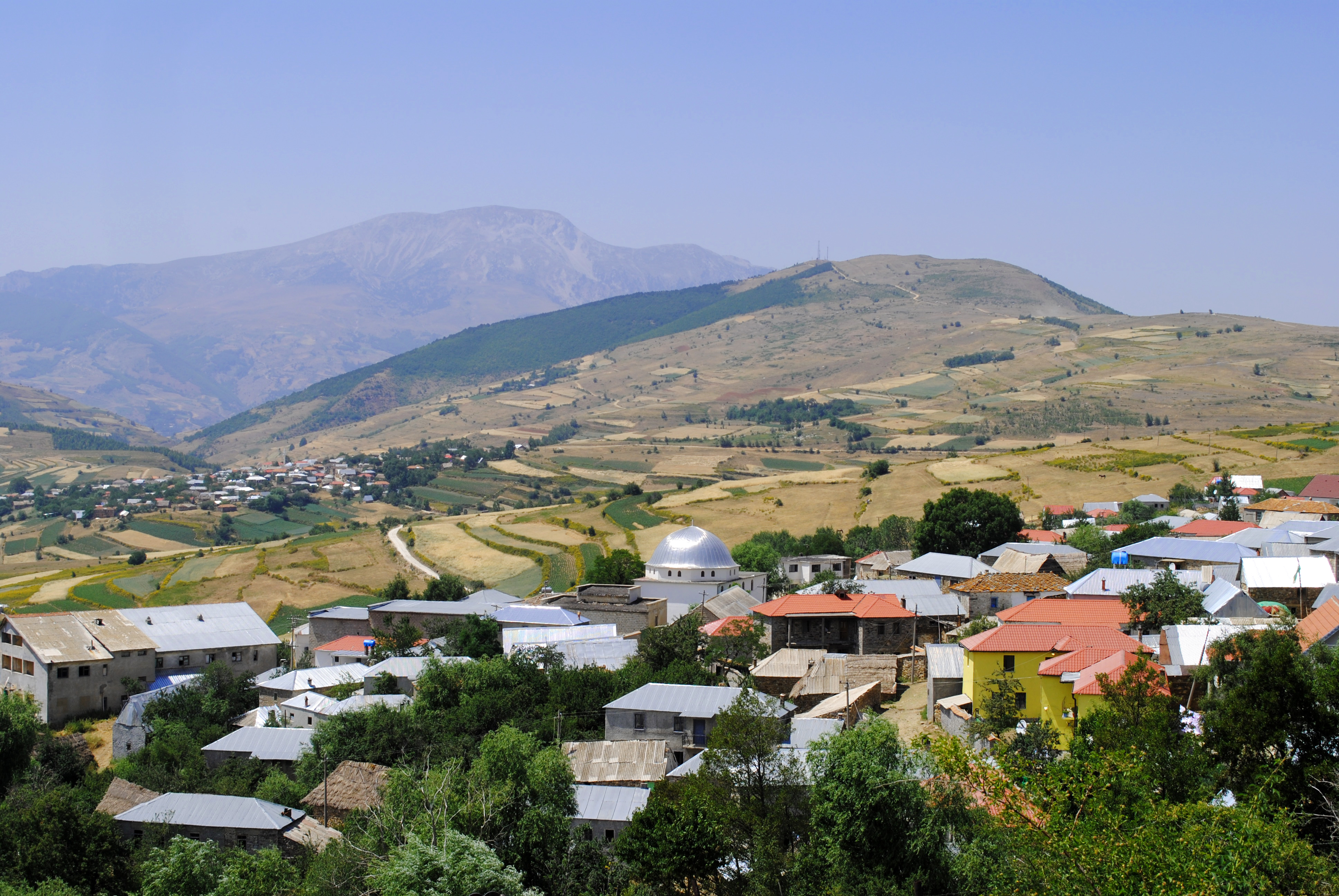

- Location within Albania
- Coordinates: 41°59′N 20°36′E
- Country: Albania
- County: Kukës
- Municipality: Kukës
- Administrative unit: Shishtavec
- Elevation: 1,300 m (4,300 ft)
- Time zone: UTC+1 (CET)
  - Summer (DST): UTC+2 (CEST)
- Website: www.fshatishishtavec.com

Shishtavec is a village in Kukës County in northeastern Albania. It was also the seat of the former municipality of the same name. At the 2015 local government reform it became part of the municipality Kukës. The administrative unit of Shishtavec contains the villages Borje, Oreshkë, Cërnalevë and Shishtavec which are populated by the Muslim Slavic-speaking Gorani people, whereas the villages of Novosej, Kollovoz and Shtrezë are inhabited by Albanians.

== Demographics ==
Shishtavec is home to around 300 households and 1,800 Gorani residents. The area is part of the wider Gora region, most of it lying on the other side of the border in Kosovo.

According to the 2011 census, 68.3% of the municipality identified ethnically as Albanian, while 7.7% identified as Macedonian. The remainder did not declare an ethnicity.

According to the 2023 Albanian census, the first one where a Bulgarian minority was officially recognised by the Albanian government, a total of 2,174 people self-identified as Bulgarians in the Kukës County. At the same time, the population of the two Gorani-inhabited administrative units of Zapod and Shishtavec stood at 3,671 in 9 Gorani and 5 Albanian villages. Only 5 residents of the entire Kukës County self-identified as Macedonians.

== Agriculture ==
Roughly 250 acres (100 ha) of potatoes are planted annually in Shishtavec.

== See also ==
Gorani people
Bulgarians in Albania
