= Lomnica, Vrapčište =

Lomnica Ломница Llomnicë
- Village
- Location within North Macedonia
- Country: North Macedonia
- Region: Polog
- Municipality: Vrapčište

Population (2021)
  - Total: 118
- Time zone: UTC+1 (CET)
  - Summer (DST): UTC+2 (CEST)
- Car plates: GV
- Website: .

Lomnica (Macedonian: Ломница, Albanian: Llomnicë) is a village in the municipality of Vrapčište, North Macedonia. It used to be part of Negotino-Pološko Municipality.

== History ==
According to the 1467-68 Ottoman defter, Lomnica appears as being largely inhabited by an Orthodox Christian Albanian population. Due to Slavicisation, some families had a mixed Slav-Albanian anthroponomy - usually a Slavic first name and an Albanian last name or last names with Albanian patronyms and Slavic suffixes.

The names are: Andreja, son of Gjon; Aleska, his brother; Gjon, son of Lazor; Gjon, son of Leka; Nikolla, son of Matosh; Dabziv, poor; the widow of Gjon; Gjini, son of Petro; Bojk-o, son of Gjon; Luka, son of Gjon; Nikolla, son of Gjergj; Petro, son of Gjerjg; Bogdan, son of Tanush; Nikolla, son of Tanush; Andreja, son of Andre; Stojko, son of Andre; Gjon, son of Niko; Gjuro, son of Niko; Rajk-o, the son of Tano.

== Demographics ==
As of the 2021 census, Lomnica had 118 residents with the following ethnic composition:

- Albanians 93
- Persons for whom data are taken from administrative sources 25

According to the 2002 census, the village had a total of 574 inhabitants. Ethnic groups in the village include:

- Albanians 571
- Macedonians 1
- Others 2

According to the 1942 Albanian census, Lomnica was inhabited by 463 Muslim Albanians.

In statistics gathered by Vasil Kanchov in 1900, the village of Lomnica was inhabited by 166 Мuslim Albanians.
