= Novo Selo, Vrapčište =

Novo Selo Ново Село
- Village
- Location within North Macedonia
- Coordinates: 41.943942°N 20.861935°E
- Country: North Macedonia
- Region: Polog
- Municipality: Vrapčište

Population (2002)
  - Total: 19
- Time zone: UTC+1 (CET)
  - Summer (DST): UTC+2 (CEST)
- Car plates: GV
- Website: .

Novo Selo (Macedonian: Ново Село) is a village in the municipality of Vrapčište, North Macedonia.

== Demographics ==
According to the 2002 census, the village had a total of 19 inhabitants. Ethnic groups in the village include:

- Macedonians 19

In statistics gathered by Vasil Kanchov in 1900, the village of Novo Selo was inhabited by 72 Christian Bulgarians.
