= Negotino, Vrapčište =

Negotino Неготино Negotinë
- Village
- Location within North Macedonia
- Coordinates: 41°52′42″N 20°53′02″E
- Country: North Macedonia
- Region: Polog
- Municipality: Vrapčište

Population (2021)
  - Total: 3,068
- Time zone: UTC+1 (CET)
  - Summer (DST): UTC+2 (CEST)
- Car plates: GV
- Website: .

Negotino (Macedonian: Неготино, Albanian: Negotinë) is a village in the municipality of Vrapčište, North Macedonia. It used to be part of Negotino-Pološko Municipality.

== History ==
Negotino is attested in the 1467/68 Ottoman tax registry (defter) for the Nahiyah of Kalkandelen. The village had a total of 90 Christian households, 5 bachelors and 7 widows.

In statistics gathered by Vasil Kanchov in 1900, the village of Negotino was inhabited by 200 Muslim Albanians and 32 Christian Bulgarians.

== Demographics ==
As of the 2021 census, Negotino had 3,068 residents with the following ethnic composition:

- Albanians 2,962
- Persons for whom data are taken from administrative sources 102
- Macedonians 3
- Others 1

According to the 2002 census, the village had a total of 3,673 inhabitants. Ethnic groups in the village include:

- Albanians 3,659
- Turks 1
- Serbs 1
- Bosniaks 1
- Others 11

According to the 1942 Albanian census, Negotino was inhabited by 1,220 Muslim Albanians.
