= Gorjane, Vrapčište =

Gorjane Горјане Gorjan
- Village
- Location within North Macedonia
- Coordinates: 41°54′N 20°53′E
- Country: North Macedonia
- Region: Polog
- Municipality: Vrapčište

Population (2021)
  - Total: 25
- Time zone: UTC+1 (CET)
  - Summer (DST): UTC+2 (CEST)
- Car plates: GV
- Website: .

Gorjane (Macedonian: Горјане, Albanian: Gorjan) is a village in the municipality of Vrapčište, North Macedonia. It used to be part of Negotino-Pološko Municipality.

== History ==
Gorjane is attested in the 1467/68 Ottoman tax registry (defter) for the Nahiyah of Kalkandelen. The village had a total of 20 Christian households and 2 bachelors.

== Demographics ==
As of the 2021 census, Gorjane had 25 residents with the following ethnic composition:

- Albanians 25

According to the 2002 census, the village had a total of 70 inhabitants. Ethnic groups in the village include:

- Albanians 70

According to the 1942 Albanian census, Gorjane was inhabited by 280 Muslim Albanians.

In statistics gathered by Vasil Kanchov in 1900, the village of Galate was inhabited by 190 Мuslim Albanians and 55 Orthodox Bulgarians.
