= Siničane =

Siničane Синичане Siniçan
- Village
- Location within Republic of Macedonia
- Coordinates: 41°56′N 20°55′E
- Country: North Macedonia
- Region: Polog
- Municipality: Bogovinje

Population (2021)
  - Total: 1,205
- Time zone: UTC+1 (CET)
  - Summer (DST): UTC+2 (CEST)
- Car plates: TE
- Website: .

Siničane (Macedonian: Синичане, Albanian: Siniçan) is a village in the municipality of Bogovinje, North Macedonia.

== History ==
Siničane is attested in the 1467/68 Ottoman tax registry (defter) for the Nahiyah of Kalkandelen. The village had a total of 52 Christian households and 2 bachelors.

According to the 1467-68 Ottoman defter, Siničane exhibits a majority of Orthodox Christian Slavic and minority Albanian anthroponyms.

== Demographics ==
As of the 2021 census, Siničane had 1,205 residents with the following ethnic composition:

- Albanians 1,155
- Persons for whom data are taken from administrative sources 50

According to the 2002 census, the village had a total of 1472 inhabitants. Ethnic groups in the village include:

- Albanians 1469
- Others 3

According to the 1942 Albanian census, Siničane was inhabited by 576 Muslim Albanians.

In statistics gathered by Vasil Kanchov in 1900, the village of Siničane was inhabited by 220 Muslim Albanians.
