= Požarane, Vrapčište =

Požarane Пожаране Pozharane
- Village
- Location within North Macedonia
- Coordinates: 41°51′N 20°52′E
- Country: North Macedonia
- Region: Polog
- Municipality: Vrapčište

Population (2002)
  - Total: 26
- Time zone: UTC+1 (CET)
  - Summer (DST): UTC+2 (CEST)
- Car plates: GV
- Website: .

Požarane (Macedonian: Пожаране, Albanian: Pozharan) is a village in the municipality of Vrapčište, North Macedonia.

== Demographics ==
Požarane is attested in the 1467/68 Ottoman tax registry (defter) for the Nahiyah of Kalkandelen. The village had a total of 40 Christian households and 2 bachelors.

According to the 2002 census, the village had a total of 26 inhabitants. Ethnic groups in the village include:

- Macedonians 22
- Albanians 4

According to the 1942 Albanian census, Požarane was inhabited by 72 Muslim Albanians, 607 Serbs and 40 Bulgarians.

In statistics gathered by Vasil Kanchov in 1900, the village of Požarane was inhabited by 720 Christian Bulgarians and 110 Muslim Albanians.
