= Taxhedin Bislimi =

Albanian Islamic Jurist

- Title: Hoxhë

Personal life
- Born: April 19, 1961 (age 65) Grušino, Socialist Republic of Macedonia, Yugoslavia
- Home town: Skopje
- Main interest(s): Uṣūl al-Fiqh (Principles of Islamic jurisprudence), Fiqh (Islamic Jurisprudence), Fatwa (Islamic legal ruling), Education in Islam, Islamic studies
- Education: University of Damascus
- Occupation: Imam, author, alim, professor

Religious life
- Religion: Islam
- Denomination: Sunni
- Jurisprudence: Hanafi
- Creed: Maturidi

Muslim leader
- Post: Mufti of Skopje
- Period in office: 2006-2010
- Influenced: Jusuf Zimeri

Taxhedin Bislimi (born April 19, 1961) is a Macedonian imam, Islamic jurist, author, professor, and former Mufti. He has written on various Islamic subjects and has appeared in public religious events and media.

== Early life and education ==
Taxhedin Bislimi was born into an ethnic Albanian family in the village of Grušino, located near the city of Skopje in North Macedonia. He completed his primary education in his hometown. For secondary and university studies, he moved to Syria, where he attended the University of Damascus. There, he enrolled in and graduated from the Faculty of Sharia, receiving formal academic training in Islamic law and its foundational sciences. After completing his undergraduate education, he pursued postgraduate studies at the Imam Ouzai University in Beirut, Lebanon. At this institution, he earned a master's degree with the thesis "Vakëfi në Maqedoni 1391–2001", which covered the historical development and administration of Islamic endowments (waqf) in Macedonia between 1391 and 2001. He continued his academic work at the Faculty of Islamic Sciences in Novi Pazar, Serbia, where he completed his doctoral studies. His PhD dissertation was titled "Kontrata e pajtimit në të drejtën islame dhe roli i saj te populli shqiptar", focusing on reconciliation contracts in Islamic jurisprudence and their application within the Albanian context.

== Career ==
After completing his studies, Bislimi began working in his native village, where he was employed as an imam, preacher (vaiz), and religious instructor (mualim). In addition to these duties, he took on an academic role as a lecturer at the Faculty of Islamic Sciences in Skopje. There, he taught courses in Islamic jurisprudence (Fiqh) and its methodology (Usul al-Fiqh). In 2006, he was appointed Mufti of Skopje, a position he held until 2010. As Mufti, he was responsible for overseeing religious affairs in the capital region, issuing legal opinions (fatwas), and coordinating with local Islamic institutions. His work has involved contributions to Islamic education, curriculum development, and religious administration.

== Works ==
Bislimi has authored several works on Islamic theology, jurisprudence, and education. Some of his most notable publications include:

- Hyrje në shkencën e Usuli Fikhut (2003; second edition 2018, Skopje) – An introductory textbook on the methodology of Islamic legal theory, covering foundational principles used in deriving Islamic rulings.
- Edukata Islame pjesë përbërëse e besimit, Volumes I–II (2018, Skopje) – A two-part work addressing Islamic moral conduct and its relation to belief and practice in everyday life.
- Tre vendet e shenjta: Mekë, Medinë, Kuds (2013, Skopje) – A publication discussing the religious, historical, and spiritual significance of the three holy cities in Islam: Mecca, Medina, and Jerusalem.
- Vakfi në Maqedoni, 1391–2001 (2007, Beirut) – A historical study on the functioning and role of Islamic endowments (waqf) in Macedonia over six centuries.
- Mevludi, historiku dhe dispozita e tij (2007, Skopje) – A concise examination of the origins and legal perspectives related to the celebration of the Prophet Muhammad's birthday (Mawlid).
