= Ǵurǵevište =

Ǵurǵevište Ѓурѓевиште Gjergjevisht
- Village
- Location within North Macedonia
- Coordinates: 41°54′N 20°52′E
- Country: North Macedonia
- Region: Polog
- Municipality: Vrapčište

Population (2021)
  - Total: 198
- Time zone: UTC+1 (CET)
  - Summer (DST): UTC+2 (CEST)
- Car plates: GV
- Website: .

Ǵurǵevište (Macedonian: Ѓурѓевиште, Albanian: Gjergjevisht) is a village in the municipality of Vrapčište, North Macedonia. It used to be part of Negotino-Pološko Municipality.

== History ==
According to the 1451-52 Ottoman defter, Ǵurǵevište appears as being inhabited by a Christian population, which based on anthroponymy are largely of Albanian origin. Some families had a mixed Slav-Albanian anthroponomy - that is to say, a Slavic first name and an Albanian last name or last names with Albanian patronyms and Slavic suffixes.

The names are: Petro, son of Raço; Nenada, son of Konda; Tano, son of Gjuro; Dimitiri, son of Nikolla; Ivan, son of Gjon; Petran, son of Kruz (Kryezi); Bogdan, son of Prekno; Petro, son of Kalatin; Gjorgj (Gjergj), son of Vegatar; Pavl-o, his brother; Pjako (Old man) siromah (poor); Spanqa, son of Brian; Petro, son of Gjon; Daba, son of Gjon; Gjon atmaxha (poulterer); Dimitri, son of Gjon; Grujan, the son of Gjon; Pejo, son of Prelçe (Prela); Stojko, son of Arbanas (Arbneshi).

Ǵurǵevište is attested in the 1467/68 Ottoman tax registry (defter) for the Nahiyah of Kalkandelen. The village had a total of 58 Christian households, 3 bachelors and 5 widows.

== Demographics ==
As of the 2021 census, Ǵurǵevište had 198 residents with the following ethnic composition:

- Albanians 182
- Persons for whom data are taken from administrative sources 14
- Macedonians 1
- Others 1

According to the 2002 census, the village had a total of 403 inhabitants. Ethnic groups in the village include:

- Albanians 399
- Macedonians 3
- Others 1

According to the 1942 Albanian census, Ǵurǵevište was inhabited by 479 Muslim Albanians.

In statistics gathered by Vasil Kanchov in 1900, the village of Ǵurǵevište was inhabited by 325 Muslim Albanians.
