= Jelovjane =

- Village
- Јеловјане
- Location within Republic of Macedonia
- Coordinates: 41°58′N 20°54′E
- Country: North Macedonia
- Region: Polog
- Municipality: Bogovinje

Population (2021)
  - Total: 283
- Time zone: UTC+1 (CET)
  - Summer (DST): UTC+2 (CEST)
- Car plates: TE
- Website: .

Jelovjane (Macedonian: Јеловјане) is a village in the municipality of Bogovinje, North Macedonia.

== History ==
According to the Bulgarian ethnographer Vasil Kanchov, in 1900 the village was inhabited by 950 Muslim Bulgarians. According to Russian ethnographer Afanasiy Selishchev in 1929 the village had 141 houses with 725 Bulgarian inhabitants.

According to the German historian and geographer Wilfried Krallert, dividing the South Slavs in Yugoslav Macedonia on an ethnic basis in 1931 was impossible, and therefore everyone there was labeled by him as "Macedonian". Per his study Jelovjane was inhabited then by 650 "Macedonians".

According to the data gathered by the Serbian geographer and anthropologist Jovan Trifunoski, the inhabitants of the village are of Slavic Macedonian, Albanian, and one family of Turkish origin. Today, most of the inhabitants self-identify as Turks.

== Demographics ==
Jelovjane, along with Urvič is one of two Gorani villages located in North Macedonia. The inhabitants speak the Gora dialect of Eastern South Slavic.

As of the 2021 census, Jelovjane had 283 residents with the following ethnic composition:

- Turks 173
- Persons for whom data are taken from administrative sources 68
- Macedonians 9
- Albanians 8
- Others 25

According to the 2002 census, the village had a total of 599 inhabitants. Ethnic groups in the village include:

- Turks 539
- Albanians 40
- Bosniaks 8
- Macedonians 5
- Others 7
