= Urvič, Bogovinje =

Urvič Урвич Urviç
- Village
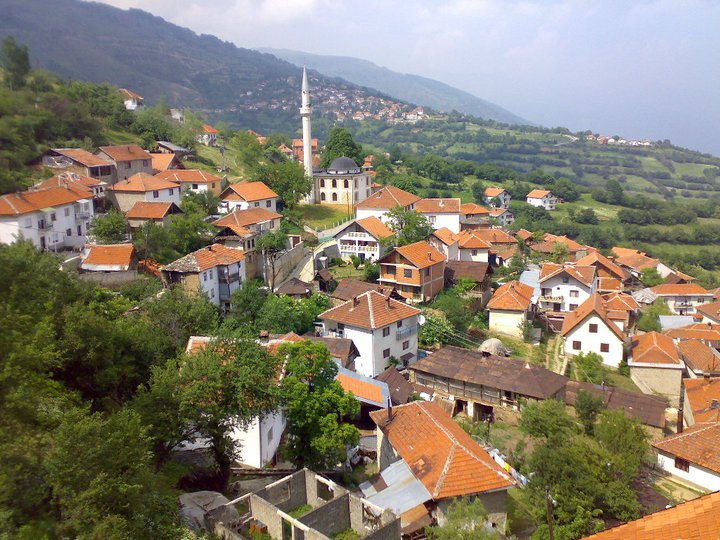

- Location within Republic of Macedonia
- Coordinates: 41°57′N 20°54′E
- Country: North Macedonia
- Region: Polog
- Municipality: Bogovinje

Population (2021)
  - Total: 746
- Time zone: UTC+1 (CET)
  - Summer (DST): UTC+2 (CEST)
- Car plates: TE
- Website: .

Urvič (Macedonian: Урвич, Albanian: Urviç) is a village in the municipality of Bogovinje, North Macedonia.

== History ==
According to the 1467-68 Ottoman defter, Urvič appears as being inhabited by Orthodox Christian Slavic population.

According to the data gathered by the Serbian geographer and anthropologist Jovan Trifunoski, the inhabitants of the village are of Slavic Macedonian and Albanian origin. Today, most of the inhabitants self-identify as Turks.

== Demographics ==
Urvič is attested in the 1467/68 Ottoman tax registry (defter) for the Nahiyah of Kalkandelen. The village had a total of 100 Christian households, 4 bachelors and 9 widows.

Urvič, along with Jelovjane is one of two Gorani villages located in North Macedonia. The inhabitants speak the Gora dialect of Eastern South Slavic.

As of the 2021 census, Urvič had 746 residents with the following ethnic composition:

- Turks 627
- Albanians 101
- Persons for whom data are taken from administrative sources 10
- Others 8

According to the 2002 census, the village had a total of 756 inhabitants. Ethnic groups in the village include:

- Turks 640
- Albanians 113
- Macedonians 1
- Serbs 6
- Others 2

According to the 1942 Albanian census, Urvič was inhabited by 987 Muslim Albanians.

In statistics gathered by Vasil Kanchov in 1900, the village of Urvič was inhabited by 360 Muslim Bulgarians.
