= Bara, Aračinovo =

Bara Бара Barë
- Village
- Location within North Macedonia
- Coordinates: 42.058333°N 21.568056°E
- Country: North Macedonia
- Region: Skopje
- Municipality: Aračinovo
- Elevation: 784 m (2,572 ft)
- Time zone: UTC+1 (CET)
  - Summer (DST): UTC+2 (CEST)
- Website: .

Bara (Macedonian: Бара, Albanian: Barë) is a historic village in the municipality of Aračinovo, Republic of North Macedonia.

== Demographics ==
In statistics gathered by Vasil Kanchov in 1900, the village of Bara was inhabited by 120 Muslim Albanians.
