= Novaḱe =

Novaḱe Новаќе Novakë
- Village
- Location within Republic of Macedonia
- Coordinates: 41°57′37″N 20°54′54″E
- Country: North Macedonia
- Region: Polog
- Municipality: Bogovinje

Population (2021)
  - Total: 174
- Time zone: UTC+1 (CET)
  - Summer (DST): UTC+2 (CEST)
- Car plates: TE
- Website: .

Novaḱe (Macedonian: Новаќе, Albanian: Novakë) is a village in the municipality of Bogovinje, North Macedonia.

== Demographics ==
Dobri Dol is attested in the 1467/68 Ottoman tax registry (defter) for the Nahiyah of Kalkandelen. The village had a total of 11 Christian households and 1 bachelor.

As of the 2021 census, Novaḱe had 174 residents with the following ethnic composition:

- Albanians 167
- Persons for whom data are taken from administrative sources 7

According to the 2002 census, the village had a total of 304 inhabitants. Ethnic groups in the village include:

- Albanians 304

According to the 1942 Albanian census, Novaḱe was inhabited by 160 Muslim Albanians.

In statistics gathered by Vasil Kanchov in 1900, the village of Bogovinje was inhabited by 135 Muslim Albanians and 40 Orthodox Bulgarians.
