= Selce Keč =

Selce Keč Селце Кеч Sellcë e Keqe
- Village
- Location within Republic of Macedonia
- Coordinates: 41°56′N 20°53′E
- Country: North Macedonia
- Region: Polog
- Municipality: Bogovinje

Population (2021)
  - Total: 86
- Time zone: UTC+1 (CET)
  - Summer (DST): UTC+2 (CEST)
- Car plates: TE
- Website: .

Selce Keč (Macedonian: Селце Кеч, Albanian: Sellcë e Keqe) is a village in the municipality of Bogovinje, North Macedonia.

== Demographics ==
Selce Keč is attested in the 1467/68 Ottoman tax registry (defter) for the Nahiyah of Kalkandelen. The village had a total of 25 Christian households.

As of the 2021 census, Selce Keč had 86 residents with the following ethnic composition:

- Albanians 62
- Persons for whom data are taken from administrative sources 24

According to the 2002 census, the village had a total of 212 inhabitants. Ethnic groups in the village include:

- Albanians 211
- Others 1

According to the 1942 Albanian census, Selce Keč was inhabited by 216 Muslim Albanians.
