= Luma (river) =

River in Albania and Kosovo

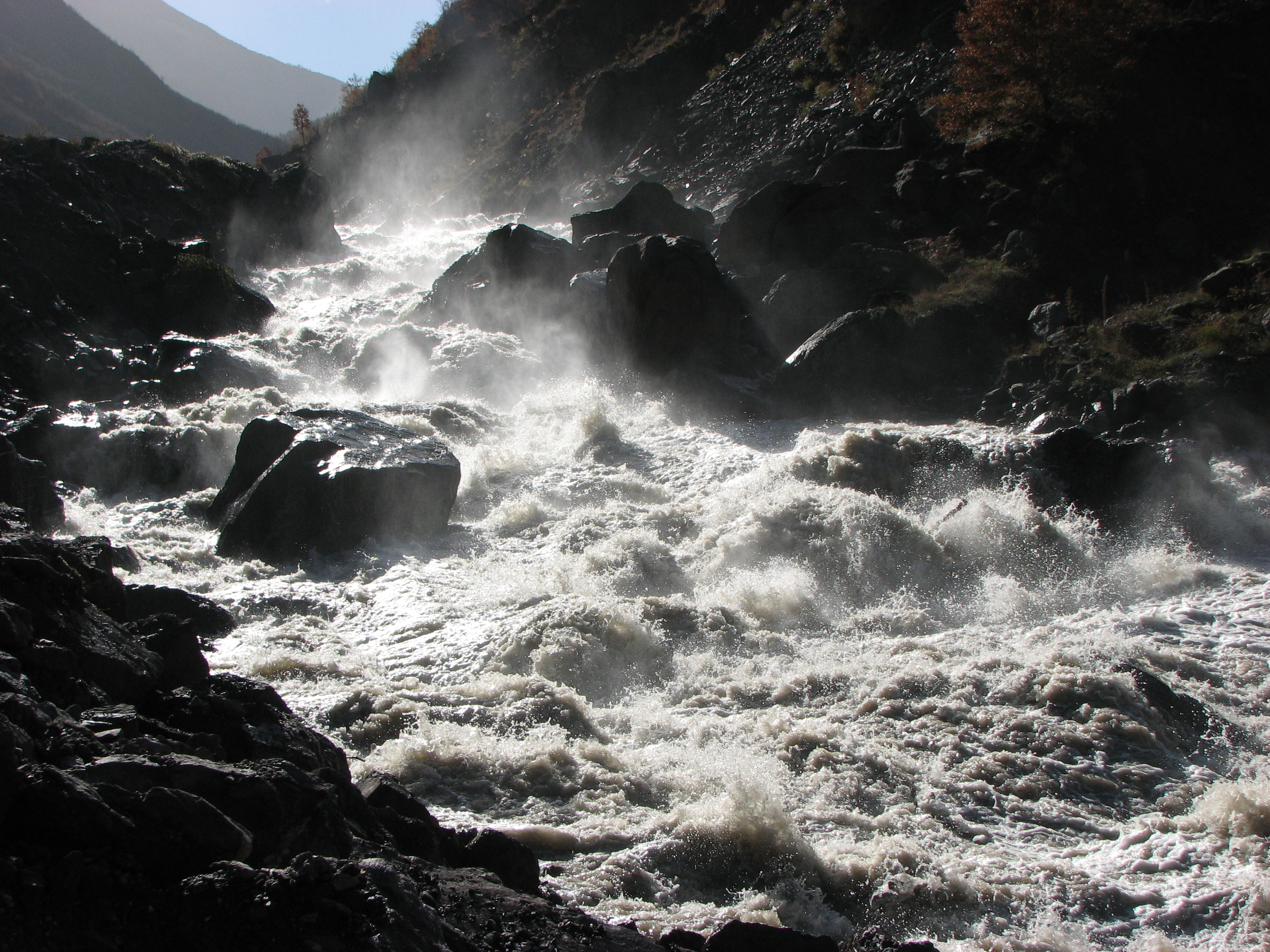
- Surging current of the Luma

Location
- Country: Albania

Physical characteristics
- Mouth: Fierza Reservoir
  - coordinates: 42.0277171°N 20.5294333°E
- Length: 32.4 km (20.1 mi)
- Basin size: 578 km^{2} (223 sq mi)
- Discharge
  - average: 13 m^{3}/s (460 cu ft/s)

Luma is a river in northeastern Albania, flowing through the historic region of Lumë, in Kukës County. A major tributary of the White Drin, it extends for 32.4 km (20.1 mi) and drains a basin covering 578 km² (223 sq mi). The watershed has a mean elevation of 1,424 m (4,672 ft) while the river’s average discharge is approximately 13 m³/s (460 cu ft/s).

== Course ==
The Luma originates at the confluence of the Orgjost and Topojan streams. The former rises on the western slopes of the Šar Mountains in Kosovo, while the latter drains the western margin of Kallabak. From this junction, the river flows southwest through the highlands of the historic Lumë region.

In its upper course, the river traverses the Shishtavec Plateau before entering the Vanave Gorge, a narrow valley situated between the massifs of Koritnik and Gjallica. Within the gorge, the river has carved its channel through Paleozoic limestone formations, creating steep and rugged terrain.

After leaving the mountainous section, Luma enters the Kukës Basin. Prior to the construction of the Fierza Hydroelectric Power Station, the river flowed directly into the White Drin. Today, it empties into the Fierza Reservoir near Kukës, where its waters contribute to the Drin hydroelectric system.

== See also ==
- List of rivers of Albania
