= Gorani people =

Ethnic group in Kosovo

Gorani Goranci Горанци
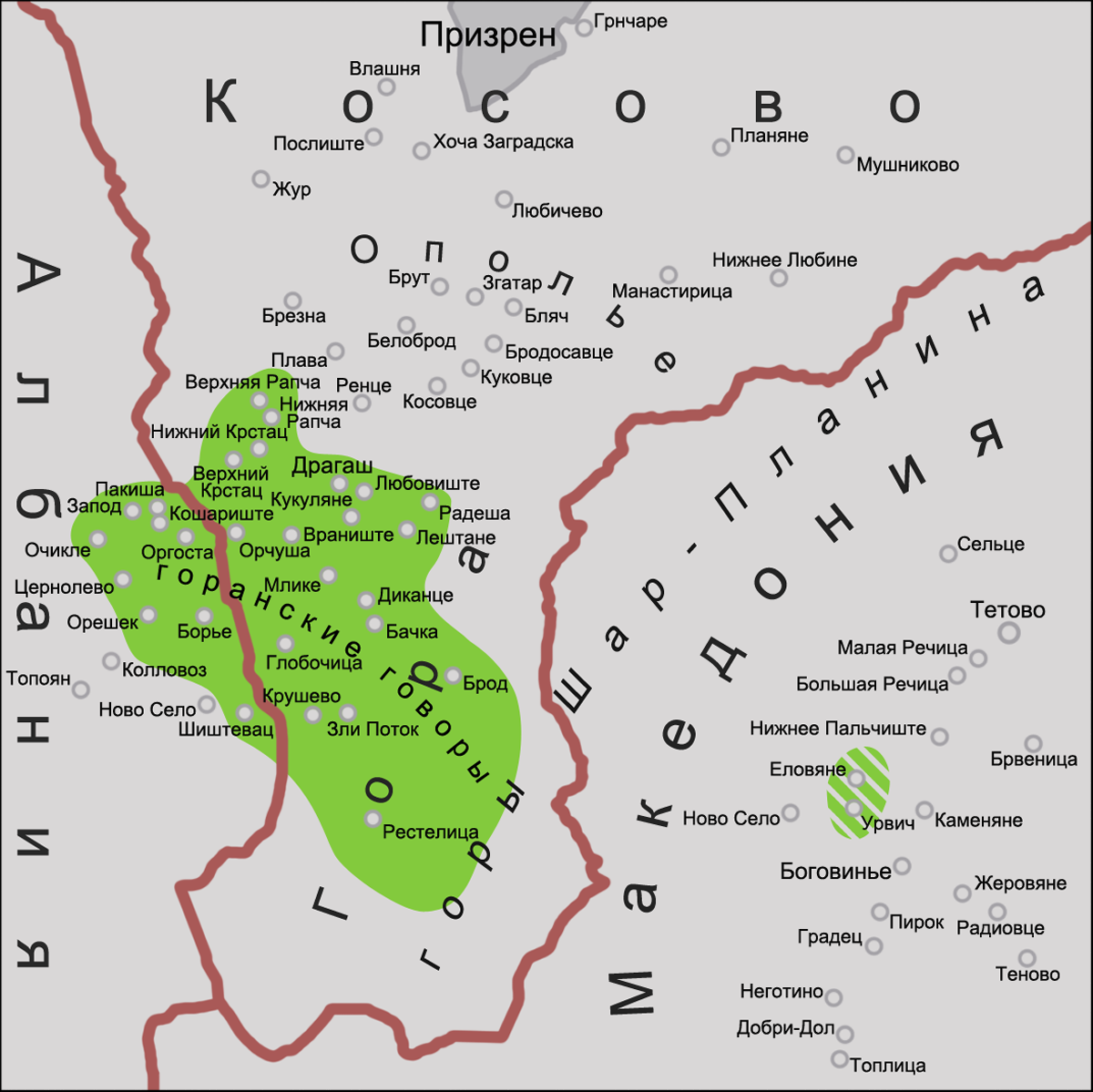
- Gorani inhabited area (green) in Albania, Kosovo and North Macedonia

Total population
- c. 20,000

Regions with significant populations
- Kosovo: 9,140 (2024)
- Serbia: 7,700 (2022)
- Albania: Unknown
- Montenegro: 280 (2023)
- Croatia: 246 (2021)
- North Macedonia: 148 (2021)
- Bosnia and Herzegovina: 24 (2013)

Languages
- Goranski; Bulgarian; Albanian; Macedonian; Serbian

Religion
- Sunni Islam

Related ethnic groups
- Bosniaks, Pomaks, Torbeši, Bulgarians, Macedonians, Serbs

The Gorani ([ɡɔ̌rani], Cyrillic: Горани) or Goranci ([ɡɔrǎːntsi], Cyrillic: Горанци) are a South Slavic ethnic group native to the Gora region, the triangle between Kosovo, Albania, and North Macedonia. They number an estimated 20,000 people and speak a transitional South Slavic dialect called Goranski. The vast majority of the Gorani people adhere to Sunni Islam.

== Name ==
The ethnonym Goranci, meaning "highlanders", is derived from the Slavic toponym gora, which means "hill, mountain". Another autonym of this people is Našinci, which literally means "our people, our ones".

In Macedonian sources, the Gorani are sometimes grouped together with Torbeši.

In the Albanian language, they are known as Goranët and sometimes by other exonyms, such as Bullgarët ("Bulgarians"), Torbesh ("bag carriers") and Poturë ("turkified", from po-tur, literally not Turk but, "turkified", used for Islamized Slavs).

== Origin of the Gorani ==
The ethnic origin of the Gorani is not clearly established and remains subject to differing interpretations. Serbian and Bulgarian authors often regard the Gorani as descendants of Islamized Serbs or Bulgarians, respectively. This view is based on the argument that the population of the region is believed to have belonged predominantly to Orthodox Christianity prior to the Ottoman conquest.

In contrast, Albanian authors argue that the Gorani were originally of Albanian origin and were gradually Slavicized over time, partly through the influence of the Orthodox Church. As evidence, they point to cultural similarities with Albanians, particularly with the inhabitants of the Luma region. They also refer to historical events in which the Gorani population acted together with Albanians, such as during the League of Prizren, the Balkan Wars, and the First World War.

Since the 1990s, some political actors, particularly the SDA, have also classified the Gorani as Bosniaks. This interpretation is justified by their shared Slavic language and Islamic faith, although critics regard it as the result of more recent political developments.

Due to these differing national and historical interpretations, the origin of the Gorani remains the subject of scholarly and political debate.

== Wartime periods in Gora ==
The Gora region was repeatedly the scene of armed conflicts and resistance movements against various ruling powers and occupying forces. During the Russo–Ottoman War (1877–1878), inhabitants of Gora fought alongside Albanian forces against Serbian and Russian troops. Among the leading figures of this period were Mulla Arif Krusha and Mehmet Alia, both of whom were members of the League of Prizren.

During the First Balkan War (1912–1913), the region was occupied by the Serbian Army. The resistance culminated in an uprising in the Koritnik Mountains in 1913 under the leadership of Nail Hyseni Dana, Mulla Rasim Selman Zapodi, and other local leaders, with the Gorani fighting together with neighboring Albanian groups against Serbian forces. After the uprising was suppressed, reprisals and massacres against the civilian population followed. The largest massacre took place in Restelica.

During the First World War, Gora came under Austro-Hungarian occupation. The war years were marked by famine and emigration. Shortly afterward, the Gora region was divided: nine villages were assigned to Albania, while the remainder became part of the Kingdom of Serbs, Croats and Slovenes. During the Second World War (1941–1944/45), Gora was once again temporarily incorporated into Albania under Italian occupation before being reintegrated into Yugoslavia after the war, with the previous partition restored.

== Kosovo War (1998–1999) in Gora ==
During the Kosovo War (1998–1999), the Gora region was affected by military operations. In the preceding years, the Serbian authorities pursued policies in the region that were perceived by parts of the Gorani population as preferential treatment, with the aim of politically aligning the Gorani with Serbia and increasing tensions between the Gorani and Albanian communities.

In Gorani villages such as Krushevo and Restelica, some inhabitants formed armed units to defend themselves against Serbian paramilitary forces. There are reports that, following the expulsion of their Albanian neighbors from Opoja, Gorani residents took care of the property that had been left behind.

The General Staff of the KLA temporarily halted the advance of recruits from Albania through the Gora region. This was done explicitly to prevent the Serbian Army from using forcibly mobilized Gorani as “cannon fodder” against the KLA, which could have led to a bloody conflict between the two communities.

In March 1999, Gorani living near the Albanian border in the Kukës region opened their homes to Kosovar Albanians who had been forcibly expelled by the Serbian Army.

== History ==
=== Contemporary period ===
The Gora municipality and Opoja region remained separated during the Milošević period. After the war, the Gorani-majority Gora municipality was merged with the Albanian inhabited Opoja region to form the municipality of Dragash by the United Nations Mission (UNMIK) and the new administrative unit has an Albanian majority.

In 2007, the Kosovo provisional institutions opened a school in Gora to teach the Bosnian language, which sparked minor consternation amongst the Gorani population. Many Gorani refuse to send their children to school due to societal prejudices, and threats of assimilation to Bosniaks or Albanians. Consequently, Gorani organized education per Serbia's curriculum.

In 2013, Safet Kuši, a Gorani political leader of the Unique Gorani Party expressed a desire for Gora (the former municipality which still has a Gorani majority) to join the Association of Serb Municipalities.

In 2018, 423 Bulgarian Gorani activists from Kosovo filed a petition in the country's parliament demanding their official recognition as a separate minority. In 2023, in a speech to the European Parliament, Bulgarian MEP Stanislav Stoyanov referred to the Parliament of Kosovo's the five-year delay in hearing the petition as "very concerning" and called on the institution to grant Kosovo Gorani Bulgarian minority rights as in Albania, condemning the practice to count them as a separate ethnic group or as Bosniaks.

Most Gorani state that the unstable situation and economic issues drive them to leave Kosovo. There is also some mention of threats and discrimination by ethnic Albanians.

Apart from the multiethnic town of Dragash, the Gorani people of Kosovo continue to live in villages primarily inhabited by their community and relations with Albanians remain tense. Mixed marriage between both communities do not occur with the exception of a few Gorani families that have migrated to Prizren.

== Demographics ==
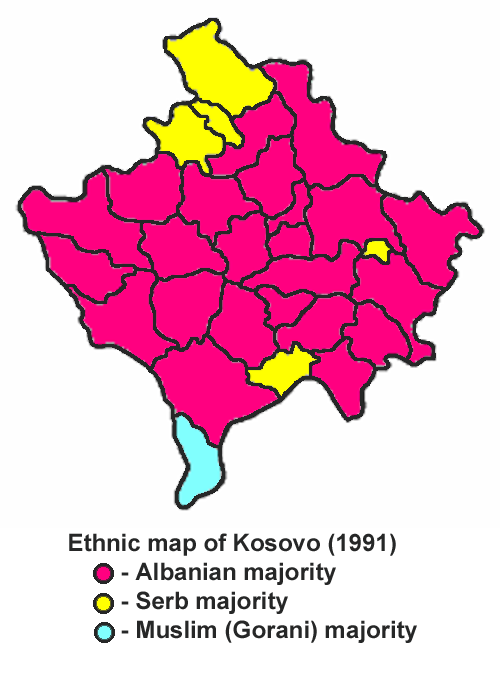
Ethnic map of Kosovo in 1991 (former municipality of Gora marked in blue)

According to data from the 2024 Kosovo census, the number of Gorani in Kosovo stands ar 9,140. In 1998, it was estimated that they numbered at least 50,000.

Some of the local Gorani people have over time also self declared themselves as Serbs, Albanians, Macedonians, Bosniaks, Muslim Bulgarians, Turks, or just as Muslims.

According to Macedonian sources the Goranis are considered Muslim Macedonians and there are around 84,000 Goranis worldwide and 15,000 Gorani in Gora, Kosovo with 13,000 of them having Macedonian citizenship. In turn, Bulgaria considers the Slavic-speaking Muslims in both Gora and the adjacent Sredačka župa to be Muslim Bulgarians.

According to data from the 2023 Albanian census, the first one where a Bulgarian minority was officially recognised by the Albanian government, a total of 2,174 people self-identified as Bulgarians in the Kukës County. At the same time, the population of the two Gorani-inhabited administrative units of Zapod and Shishtavec stood at 3,671, in nine Gorani and five Albanian villages. By comparison, 5 residents of the entire Kukës County self-identified as Macedonians, 8 as Montenegrins, 13 as Bosniaks, and 19 as Serbs.

=== Settlements ===
In Albania, there are nine Gorani-inhabited villages: Zapod, Pakisht, Orçikël, Kosharisht, Cernalevë, Orgjost, Oreshkë, Borje and Shishtavec.

In Kosovo, there are 18 Gorani-inhabited villages: Baćka, Brod, Vranište, Globočice, Gornja Rapča, Gornji Krstac, Dikance, Donja Rapča, Donji Krstac, Zli Potok, Kruševo, Kukaljane, Lještane, Ljubošta, Mlike, Orčuša, Radeša, and Restelica, as well as the town of Dragash. Town of Dragash has a mixed population of Gorani, who live in the lower neighbourhood, and Albanians in the upper neighbourhood and constituting the majority of inhabitants.

In North Macedonia, there are two Gorani-inhabited villages located in the Polog region: Jelovjane and Urvič.

== Traditional Gorani costumes ==
The traditional dress of the Gorani bears a close resemblance to that of the Albanians. The traditional male attire consists of a plis (white felt cap), Dzamadan/Xhamadan(vest), Benevrek/tirq (woolen trousers), and openke/opinge (traditional leather shoes).

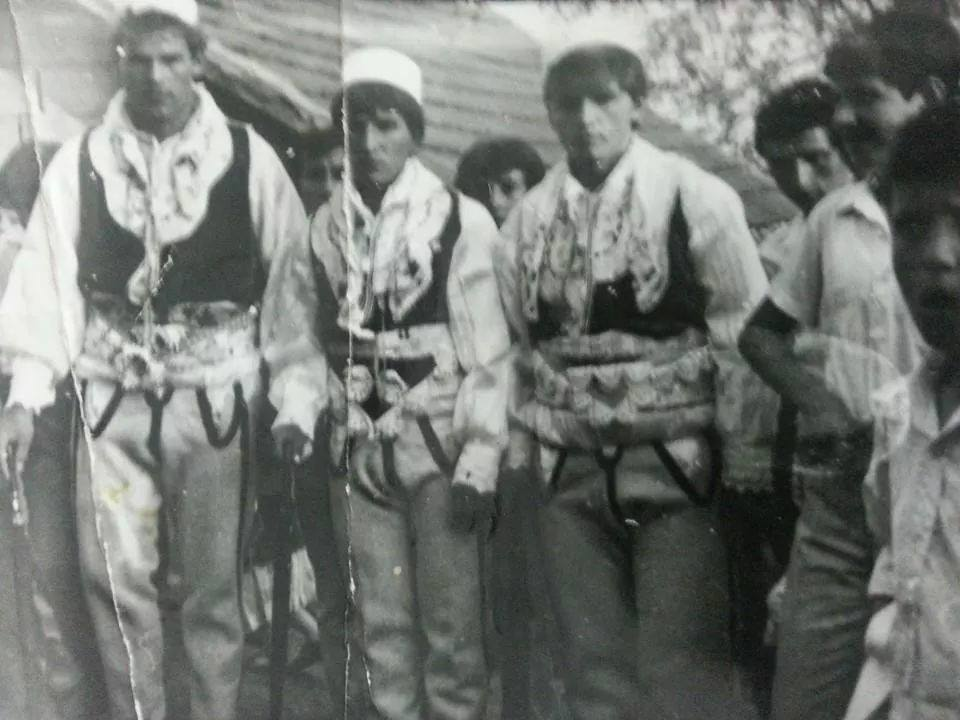
Traditional Gorani costume

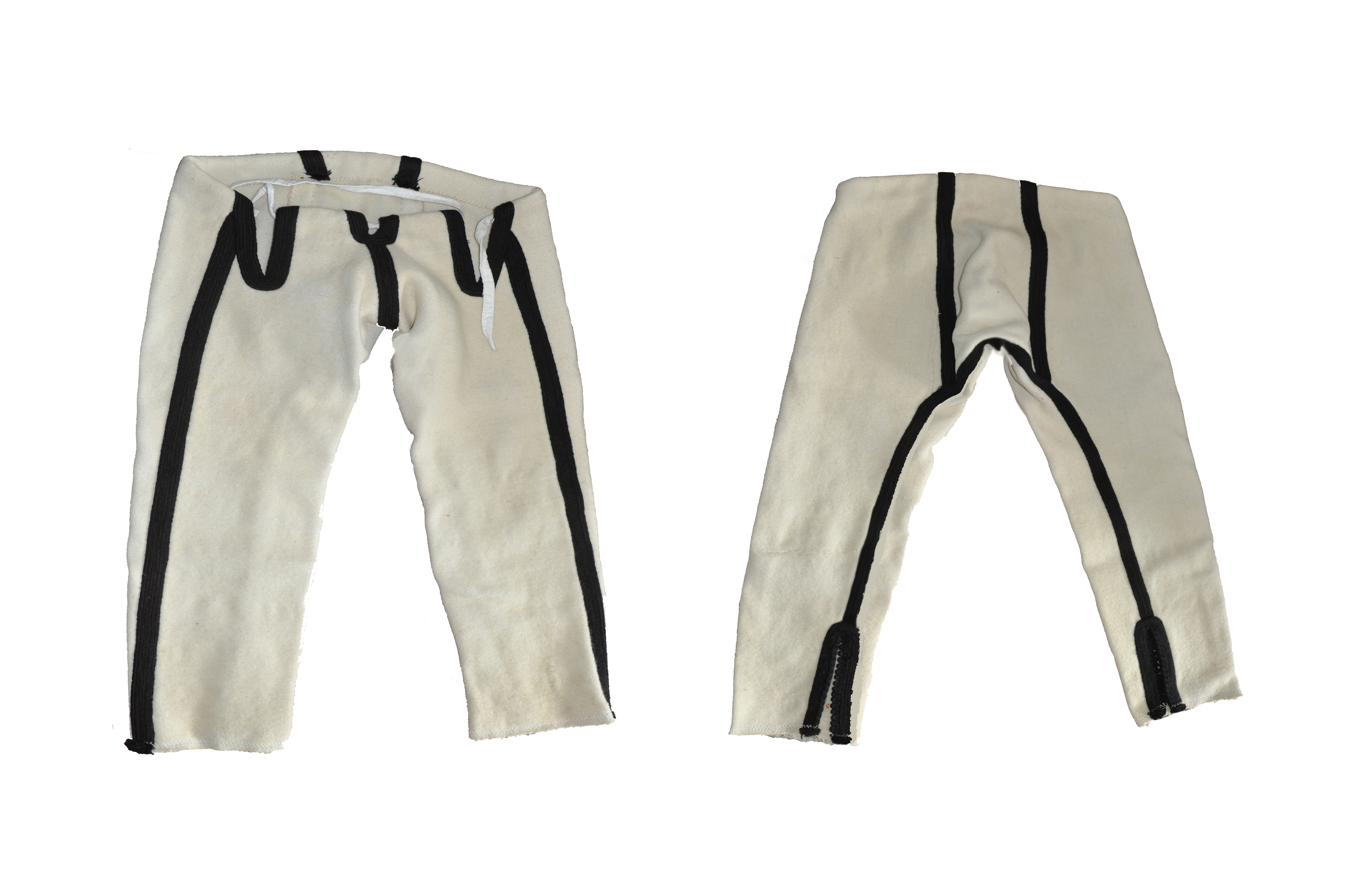
Benevrek, traditional woolen trousers worn as part of the Gorani male costume

In the Albanian part of Gora, women’s traditional dress is identical to that of the neighboring Luma region. In the Kosovo part of Gora, the traditional dress of Gorani women varies from village to village. Nevertheless, historical examples indicate that these costumes originally shared many similarities with the traditional attire of Luma, although they were subsequently modified and developed into distinct local variants over time.

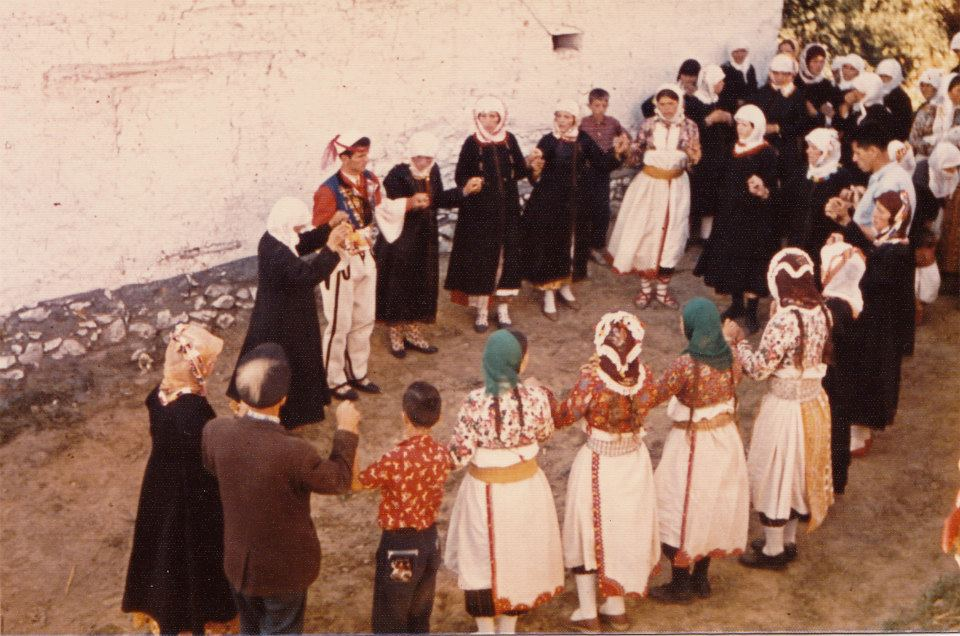
Gorani from Kosovo in traditional attire

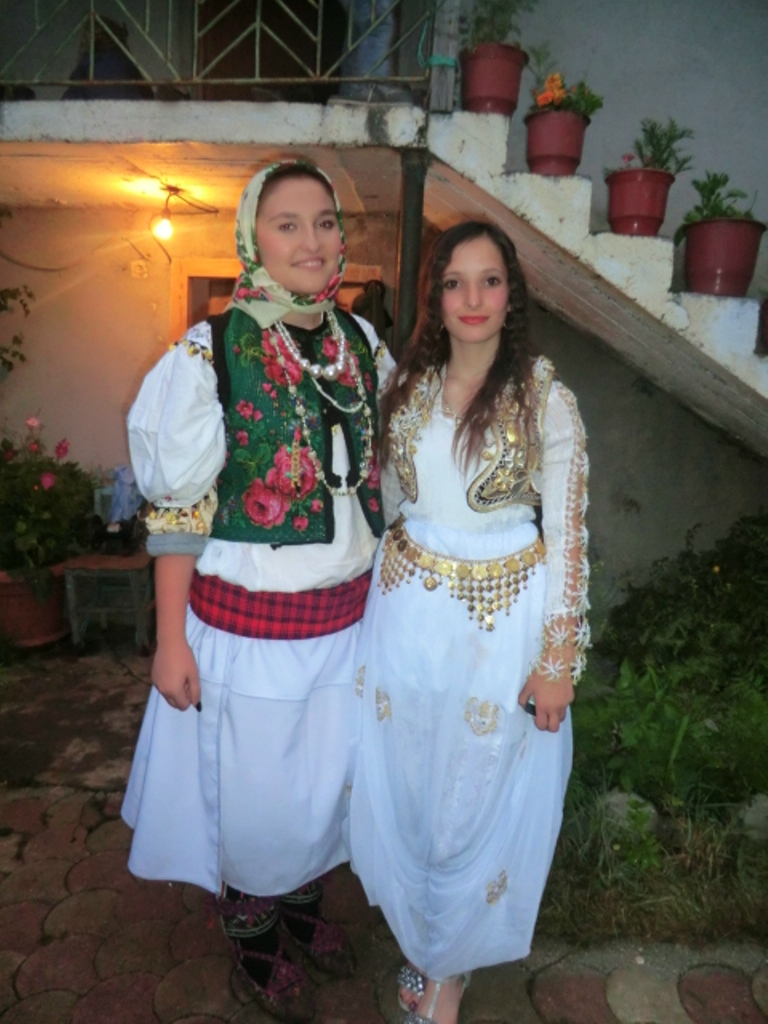
The woman on the left is wearing the traditional Gorani women's costume from the Albanian part of Gora.

== Culture ==
=== Religion ===
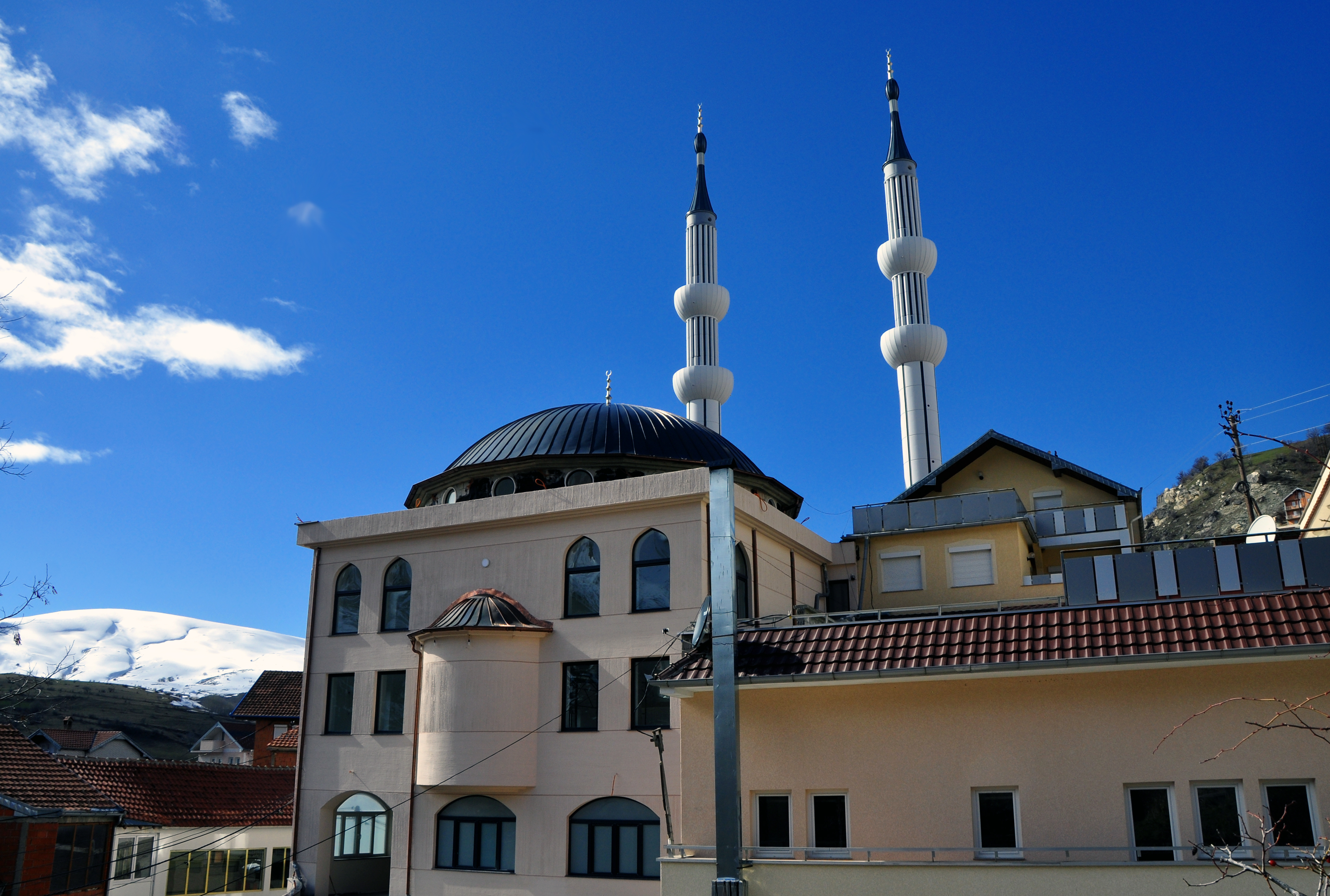
Mosque in Restelica

In the 18th century, a wave of Islamization began in Gora. The Ottoman abolition of the Archbishopric of Ohrid and Serbian Patriarchate of Peć in 1766/1767 is thought to have prompted the Islamization of Gora as was the trend of many Balkan communities. The last Christian Gorani, Božana, died in the 19th century – she has received a cult, signifying the Gorani's Christian heritage, collected by Russian consuls Anastasiev and Yastrebov in the second half of the 19th century.

=== Traditions ===
The Gorani are known for being "the best confectioners and bakers" in former Yugoslavia.

During the Ottoman period, the Gorani were also known as gunsmiths. The following villages were particularly recognized as centers of this craft, which continued there until the beginning of the 20th century and, in some cases, even until the Second World War: Borje, Oreshkë, Cërnelevë, Pakisht, Shishtavec, Krushevo, Zlipotok, Baçka, Orgjost, Vranishta, and Rapça, where the craft survived the longest, in some instances until the Second World War.

The Slavs of Gora were Christianized after 864 when Bulgaria adopted Christianity. The Ottomans conquered the region in the 14th century, which started the process of Islamization of the Gorani and neighbouring Albanians. However, the Gorani still tangentially observe some Orthodox Christian traditions, such as Slavas and Đurđevdan, and like Serbs they know their Onomastik or saint's days.

Gorani are Sunni Muslims and many practice Sufism, in particular the Halveti and Bektashi Sufi orders are widespread.

Traditional Gorani folk music includes a two-beat dance called "oro" ('circle'), which is a circle dance focused on the foot movements: it always starts on the right foot and moves in an anti-clockwise direction. The Oro is usually accompanied by instruments such as curlje, kaval, čiftelija or tapan, and singing is used less frequently in the dances than in those of the Albanians and Serbs.

The "national" sport of Pelivona is a form of oil wrestling popular among Gorani with regular tournaments being held in the outdoors to the accompaniment of curlje and tapan with associated ritualized hand gestures and dances, with origins in the Middle East through the Ottoman Empire's conquest of the Balkans.

Another popular drink is Turkish coffee which is drunk in small cups accompanied by a glass of water. Tasseography is popular among all Gorani using the residue of Turkish coffee.

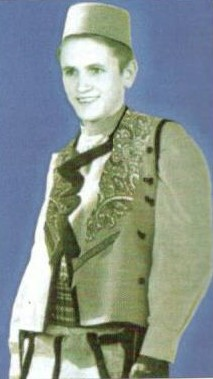
Gorani boy in folk costume

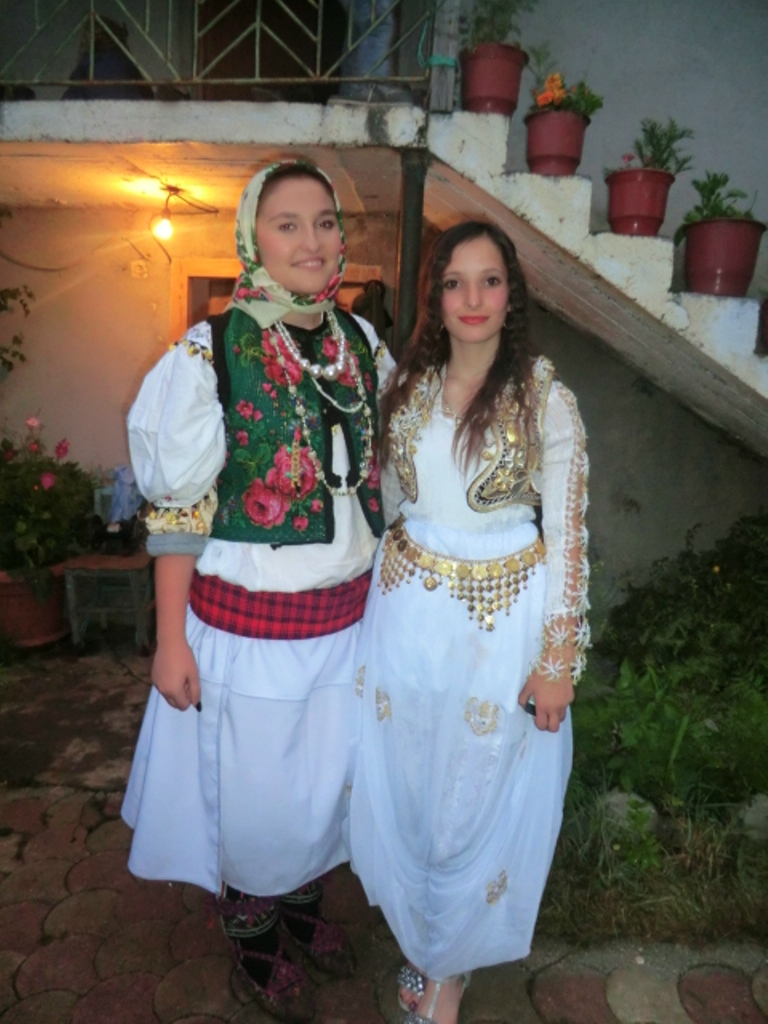
Gorani girls in folk costume

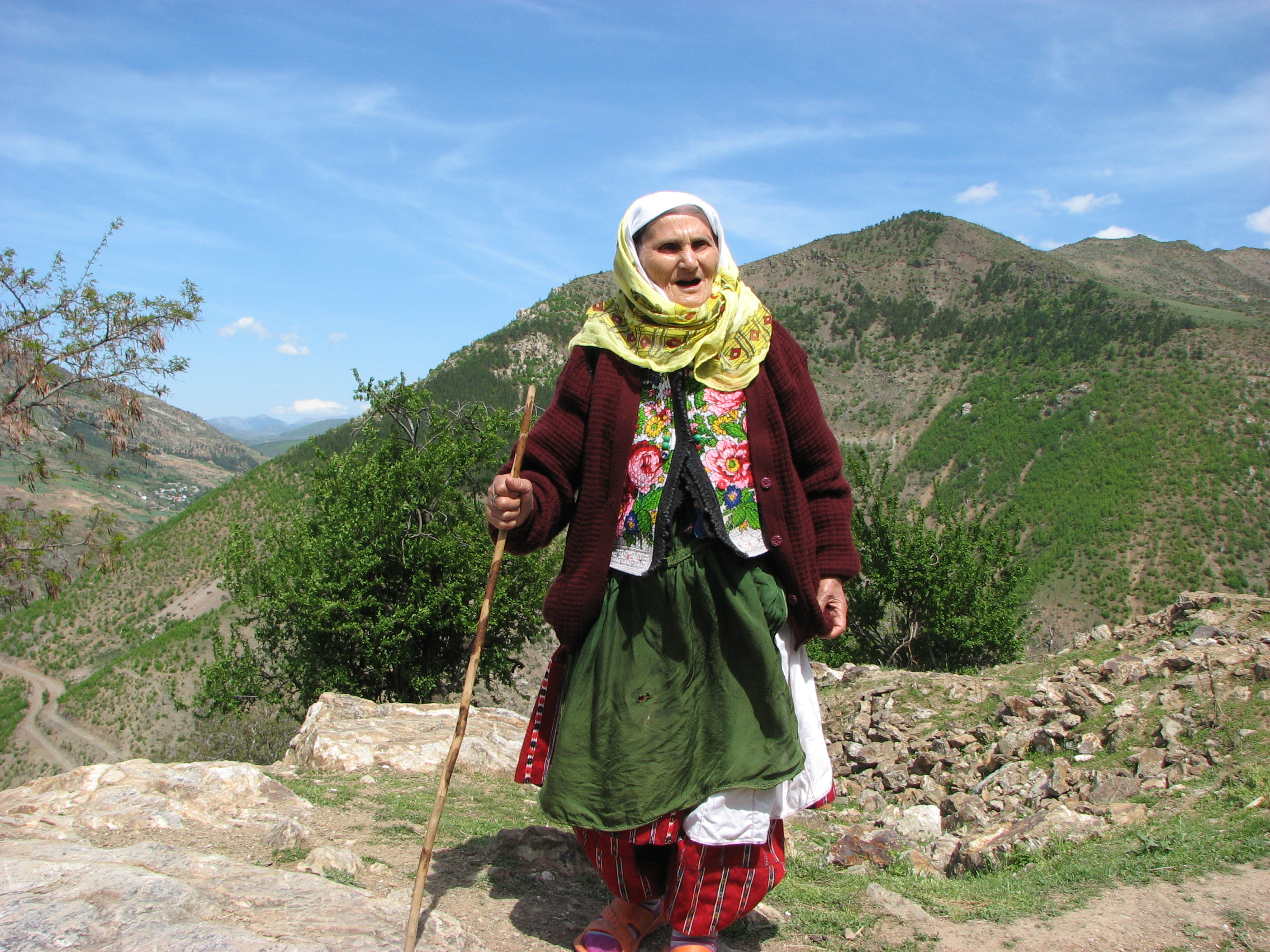
Elderly Gorani woman in traditional clothing

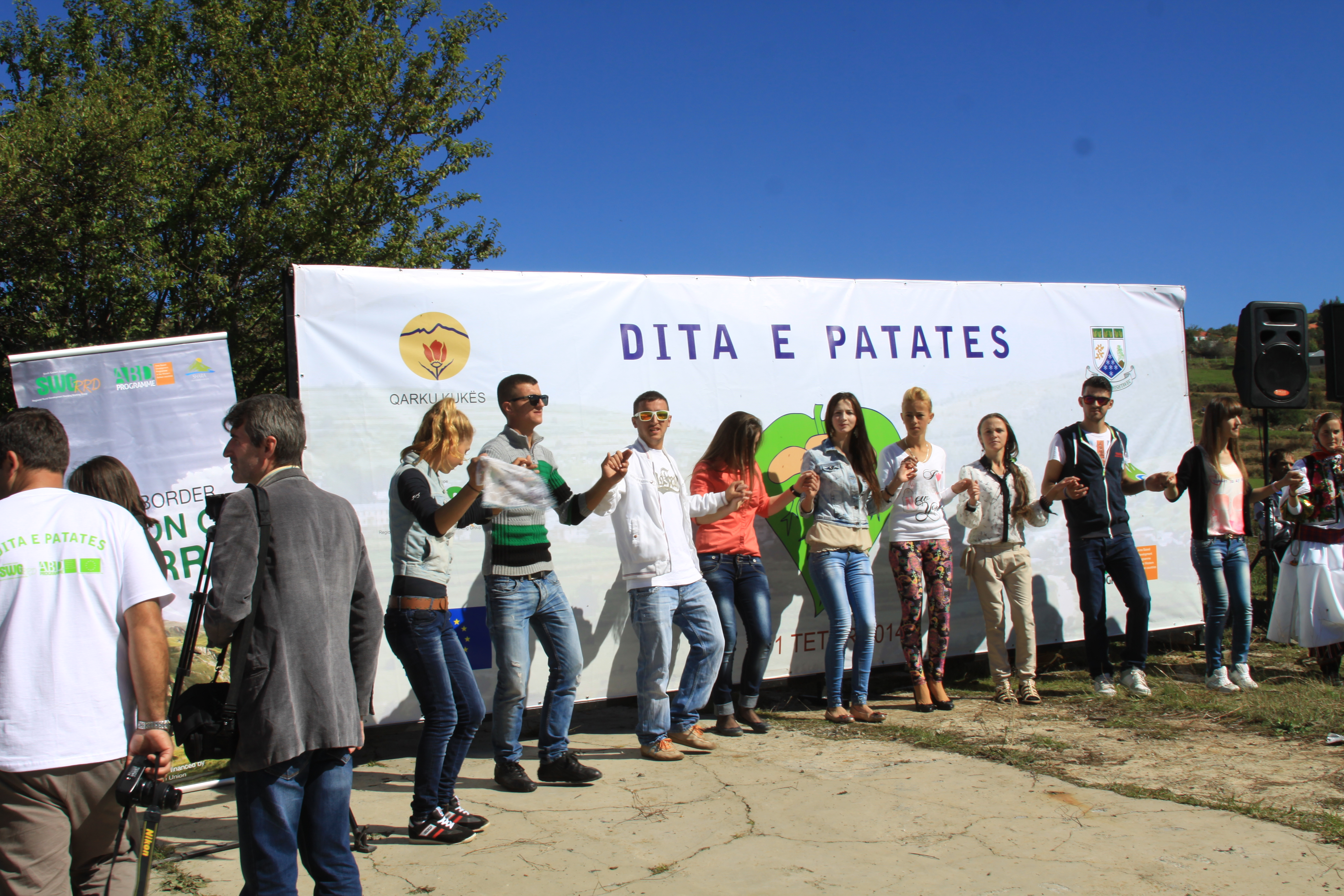
Young Gorani dancing at village festival

=== Language ===
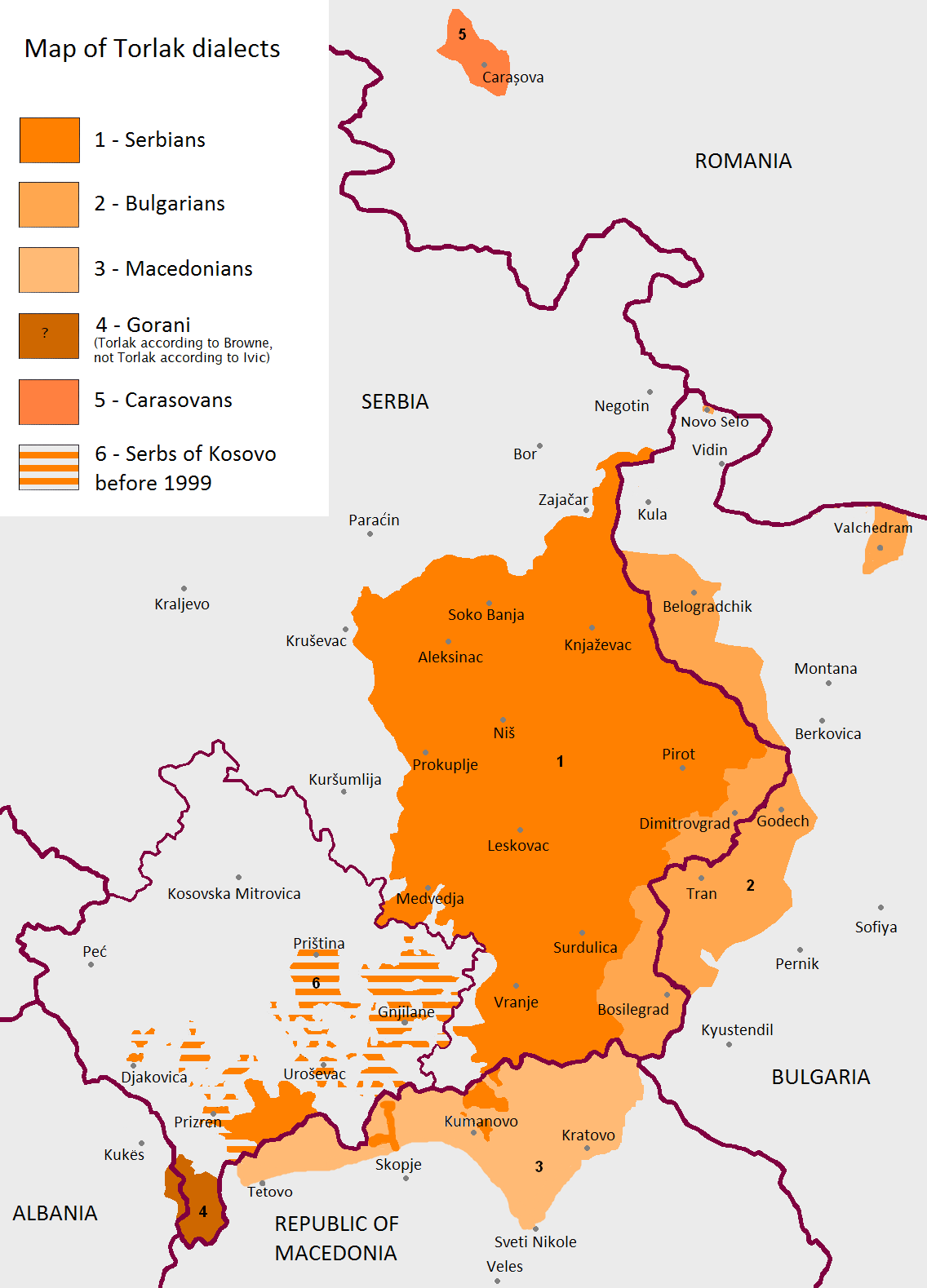
Geographical distribution of the Torlakian dialect (Gora region in dark orange)

The Gorani people speak a local South Slavic dialect known as "Našinski" or "Goranski", which forms part of a wider Torlakian dialect, spoken in Southern Serbia, Western Bulgaria and part of North Macedonia. The Slavic dialect of the Gorani community is known as Gorançe by Albanians. Within the Gorani community there is a recognition of their dialects being closer to the Macedonian language than to Serbian. The Torlakian dialect is a transitional dialect of Serbian and Bulgarian whilst also sharing features with Macedonian. The Gorani speech is classified as an Old-Shtokavian dialect of Serbian, the Prizren-Timok dialect.

Bulgarian linguists classify the Gorani dialect as part of a Bulgarian dialectal area. The Gorani have been used as a lever of Bulgarian irredentism, on the premise that if the Gora dialect is Bulgarian, then all Macedonian dialects are Bulgarian. Illustrating the Bulgarian interest is the first Gorani–Albanian dictionary (with 43,000 words and phrases) published in 2007 by Albanian-Gorani scholar Nazif Dokle, sponsored and printed by the Bulgarian Academy of Sciences. In this dictionary, Dokle defined the language as related to "the Bulgarian dialects spoken in the northwest" North Macedonia.

Within scholarship, the Goran dialects previously classified as belonging to Serbian have been reassigned to Macedonian in the 21st century.

Gorani speech has numerous loan-words, being greatly influenced by Turkish and Arabic due to the influence of Islam, as well as Albanian areally. It is similar to the Bosnian language because of the numerous Turkish loanwords. Gorani speak Serbo-Croatian in school.

According to the 1991 Yugoslav census, 54.8% of the inhabitants of the Gora municipality said that they spoke the Gorani language, while the remainder had called it Serbian. Some linguists, including Vidoeski, Brozovic and Ivic, identify the Slavic-dialect of the Gora region as Macedonian. There are assertions that Macedonian is spoken in 50 to 75 villages in the Gora region (Albania and Kosovo). According to some unverified sources, in 2003 the Kosovo government acquired Macedonian language and grammar books for Gorani schools.

In 2008 the first issue of a Macedonian-language newspaper, Гороцвет (Gorocvet) was published.

Example of a traditional Gorani song

Verno libe

Gledaj me gledaj libe, abe verno libe,
nagledaj mi se dur ti som ovde.
Utre ke odim abe verno libe dalek-dalek
na pusti Gurbet.

Racaj poracaj libe šo da ti kupim.
Ti da mi kupiš
abe gledaniku cerna šamija, ja da ga nosim
abe gledaniku i da ga želam.

Racaj poracaj abe verno
libe šo da ti pratim
Ti da mi pratiš abe
gledaniku šarena knjiga
Ja da ga pujem abe

gledaniku i da ga želam

== Organizations ==
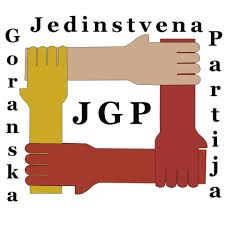
United Gorani Party (UGP)

Gorani people have several political, cultural and other organizations.

In 2000, the Civic Initiative of Gora (CIG) was founded, with headquarters in Dragaš, and it registered in 2002 as an ethnic political party. It participated in elections on various levels, independently or within wider coalitions. CIG won the Gorani reserved seat in the Transitional Assembly of Kosovo in three consecutive electoral cycles (2001, 2004, 2007), and that seat was held by Rustem Ibiši (2001-2004), Vezira Emruš (2004-2007), and Murselj Haljilji (2007-2010). In 2010, CIG also won the Gorani reserved seat in the Assembly of the Republic of Kosovo, and it was again held by Murselj Haljilji (2011-2014).

In 2014, the United Gorani Party (UGP) was also formed, headed by Adem Hodža. Within Coalition for Gora, UGP won the Gorani reserved seat in the Assembly of the Republic of Kosovo, and that seat was held by Adem Hodža (2014-2017), who was also reelected (2017-2019).

The Belgrade based Civic Initiative of Gorani, a political party headed by Orhan Dragaš, represents Gorani people in Serbia.

== Notable people ==
- Almen Abdi, Swiss footballer, from Prizrenv
- Deni Avdija, Israeli basketball player, son of Zufer
- Zufer Avdija, Israeli-Serbian former basketball player and coach, born in Pristina
- Mesip Dalifi, Serbian educator and politician
- Harun Hasani, Serbian cultural figure and politician
- Deni Hočko, Montenegrin footballer, Gorani parentage
- Adem Hodža, Kosovan politician, from Restelica
- Veldin Hodža, Kosovan footballer, from Restelica
- Zeli Ismail, English footballer, from Kukës
- Fahrudin Jusufi, Yugoslav footballer, from Zlipotok
- Sascha Jusufi, German footballer, son of Fahrudin Jusufi
- Danel Sinani, Serbian-born Luxembourg footballer, from Dragash
- Dejvid Sinani, Serbian-born Luxembourg footballer, brother of Danel
- Miralem Sulejmani, Serbian footballer, Gorani father
- Ibro Vait, Serbian academic and politician

== See also ==
- Torbeši
- Pomaks

== Sources ==
Books

- Ahmetović, B. (1999). Gora i Goranci. Beograd: Inter Ju pres.
- Duijzings, Ger (2000). Religion and the Politics of Identity in Kosovo. C. Hurst & Co. Publishers. ISBN 978-1-85065-431-5.
- Lutovac, Milisav V. (1955). Gora i Opolje: antropogeografska proučavanja. Naučna knjiga.
- Gora, Opolje i Sredska. Geografski institut "Jovan Cvijić" SANU. 1997. ISBN 978-86-80029-04-7.
- Kocheva, Anna; Choleva-Dimitrova, Anna; Vasileva, Luchia-Antonova; Kaytchev, Naoum; Pavlov, Plamen; Barlieva, Slavia; Keremedchieva, Slavka; Tashev, Spas; Aleksandrova, Tatyana (2020). On the Official Status of the Language of the Republic of Macedonia (PDF). Sofia: Prof. Marin Drinov Publishing House of the Bulgarian Academy of Sciences. ISBN 978-619-245-081-6.

Journals

- Đorđević-Crnobrnja, Jadranka (2014). "Migrations from the Gora region at the end of the 20th and the beginning of the 21st century". Glasnik Etnografskog instituta SANU. 62 (2): 35–47. doi:10.2298/GEI1402035D. hdl:21.15107/rcub_dais_8223.
- Friedman, Victor (2006). "Determination and Doubling in Balkan Borderlands" (PDF). Harvard Ukrainian Studies. 1–4: 105–116. Archived from the original (PDF) on 25 April 2017.
- Milenović, Živorad (2010). "The formation of Goran's ethnic community in Kosovo and Metohia from 1918 until now" (PDF). Baština. 28: 223–230.
- Tomašević, Radovan (1989). "ŠARPLANINSKI NAŠINCI" (PDF). Etnološke Sveske. 10: 47–57. Archived from the original (PDF) on 31 January 2022.

Symposia

- Bursać, Milan, ed. (2000), ГОРАНЦИ, МУСЛИМАНИ И ТУРЦИ У ШАРПЛАНИНСКИМ ЖУПАМА СРБИЈЕ: ПРОБЛЕМИ САДАШЊИХ УСЛОВА ЖИВОТА И ОПСТАНКА: Зборник радова са "Округлог стола" одржаног 19. априла 2000. године у Српској академији наука и уметности, Belgrade: SANU
  - Antonijević, Dragoslav (2000), Етнички идентитет Горанаца (PDF), pp. 23–29
  - Dragaš, Orhan (2000), О Горанцима (PDF), pp. 71–73
- Antonijević, Dragoslav (1995), "Identitet Goranaca", Međunarodna konferencija Položaj manjina u Saveznoj Republici Jugoslaviji, zbornik radova, Belgrade: SANU
