= Jovan Trifunoski =

Serbian geographer and anthropologist (1914–1997)

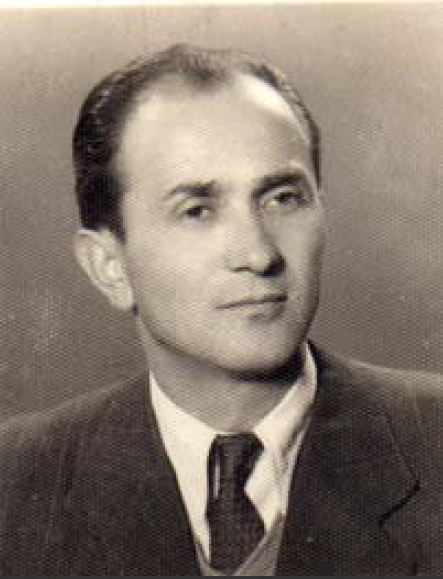
Jovan Trifunoski

Jovan Trifunoski (23 September 1914 — 1 February 1997) was a Serbian, Yugoslav and Macedonian geographer and anthropologist.

== Biography ==
He was born as Jovan Trifunović on 23 September 1914 in the village of Vrutok, then in Kingdom of Serbia, into an agrarian family. Trifunoski finished primary school in his native village and then high school in Skopje and Tetovo. He enrolled into the Faculty of Philosophy in Skopje in 1935, where he graduated in 1939. Trifunoski was a strong Cvijićist even before World War II. In the next year, he completed his military service at the Military Geographical Institute in Belgrade. From November 1940 to March 1941, he worked as an assistant professor at the Institute for Geography of the Philosophical Faculty in Skopje. In the same period, he took part in fieldwork research about Albanians in Yugoslavia.

During April war, he was mobilized in Kičevo in 1941. After Bulgarian occupation of Vardar banovina, he sought refuge in Nedić's Serbia. While living in Belgrade, he worked as an assistant professor at Belgrade Institute for Geography in 1943 and then worked as a professor in a gymnasium after being fired. After the war, he changed (Macedonianized) his surname from Trifunović to Trifunoski. In 1946, he was invited by the Yugoslav Macedonian authorities to return to Skopje and he returned to take part in the formation of the Philosophical Faculty, where he worked as an assistant professor. His work was a continuation of Serbian geographer Jovan Cvijić's anthropogeographical school. In the 1940s, he researched the area of Kaçanik Gorge. Based on his research in the regions of Kumanovo and Preševo before the war, he received his PhD in 1950 with the doctoral dissertation "Crna Gora of Kumanovo and Preševo", which he defended at the Serbian Institute of Ethnography. Two years later he became a university lecturer. He researched the Skopje Valley from the late 1940s to the late 1960s. In the 1950s, he collected large amount of demographic data about the region of Macedonia and Albania. In the 1960s and the 1970s, he researched the Kočani Valley, the regions of Veles, Kumanovo, Kriva Palanka, Debarca, Ohrid, and Struga. Trifunoski was knowledgeable in German, Bulgarian and Russian. He died in 1997 in Belgrade, then in Federal Republic of Yugoslavia.

== Studies and views ==
After doing research in the area of Vranje in the 1950s, he wrote in 1960 about the presence of Gurbeti and Djorgovci. Trifunoski's fieldwork research contradicted with Ottoman data many times, such as with the villages of Studena Bara, Mojanci, Raštak, Batinci, Dejkovec, Radišani, and Orlanci.

Trifunoski claimed in 1988 that only 20 percent of the Albanians were autochthonous in Macedonia, while the rest (80 percent) were newcomers. He based his claim on material remains from destroyed villages, cemeteries, destroyed churches and names of villages. For the claim, he drew upon a large amount of oral histories, as well as information about toponymy and destroyed places. This claim has been rejected as inaccurate by modern academics. Trifunoski relied solely on oral tradition. In 1991, he estimated slightly more than 6,000 households and 40,000 Serbian colonists before 1940 in Vardar Macedonia. He published an anthropogeographical monograph about the Ohrid-Struga region in Belgrade in 1992, based on fieldwork he did in the late 1970s.

Trifunoski advocated for the unification of Serbia and Macedonia. In his 1997 book Macedonization of South Serbia, he proclaimed that he was a Serb and in the same time criticized the policy of Macedonization implemented in Communist Yugoslavia towards the Serbs in Macedonia.

== Select bibliography ==
- Kumanovsko-preševska Crna Gora, Belgrade 1952.
- Kumanovska oblast, Skopje 1974.
- Seoska naselja Skopske kotline, Skopje 1974.

== See also ==
- Serbianisation
