= Kollovoz =

- Village
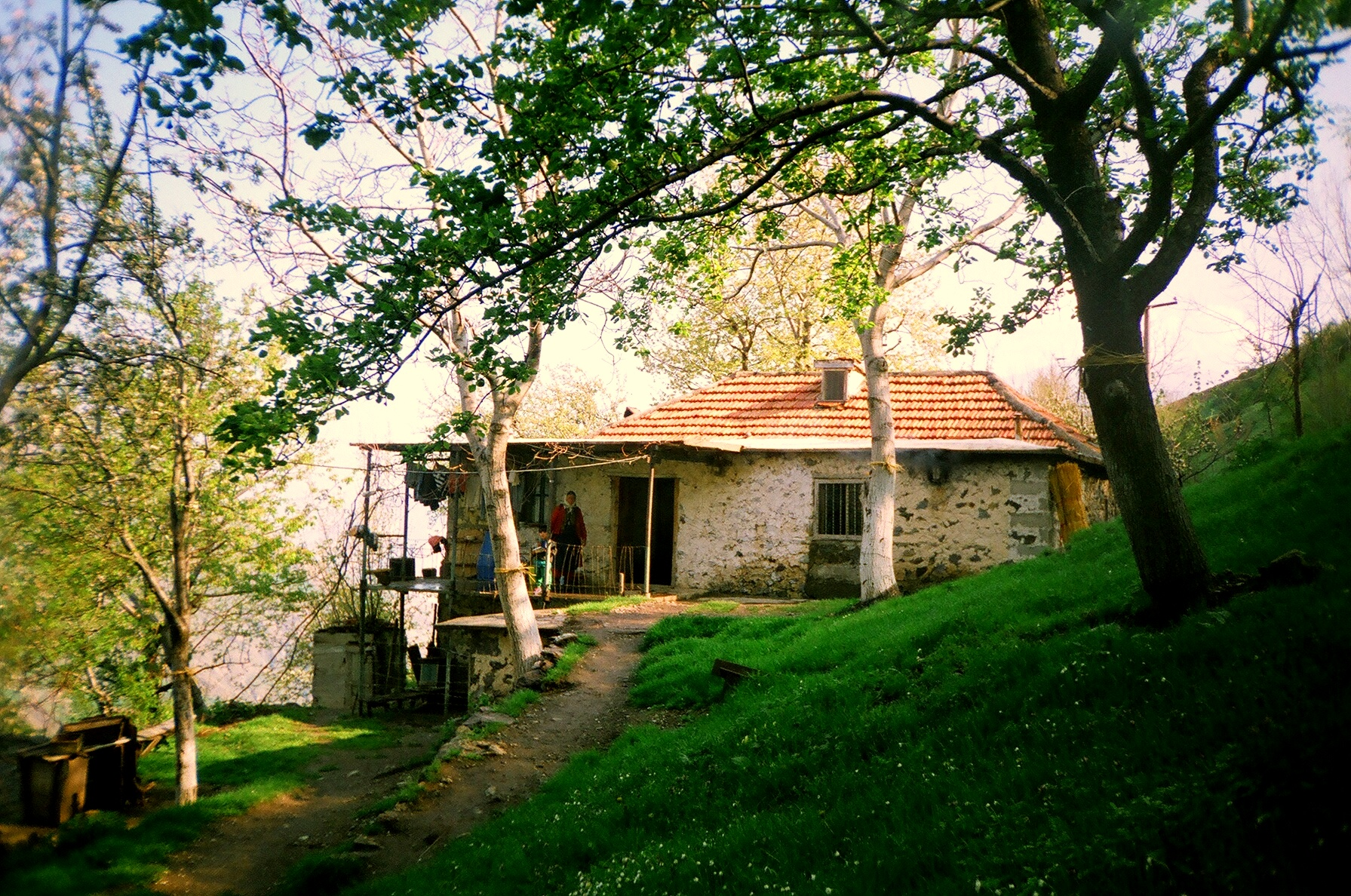

- Location within Albania
- Coordinates: 41°59′50″N 20°32′49″E
- Country: Albania
- County: Kukës
- Municipality: Kukës
- Administrative unit: Shishtavec
- Time zone: UTC+1 (CET)
  - Summer (DST): UTC+2 (CEST)
- Postal Code: 8510

Kollovoz (Albanian: Kollovoz, from Slavic kolovoz) is a village in the former Shishtavec municipality in Kukës County, Albania. At the 2015 local government reform it became part of the municipality Kukës.

It is located along the Luma river, on the west side of Kollovoz mountain. The nearby villages are Topojan, Shtrezë, Novosej, Oreshkë and Nimcë.

== Notable people ==
- Havzi Nela
