= Novosej =

- Village
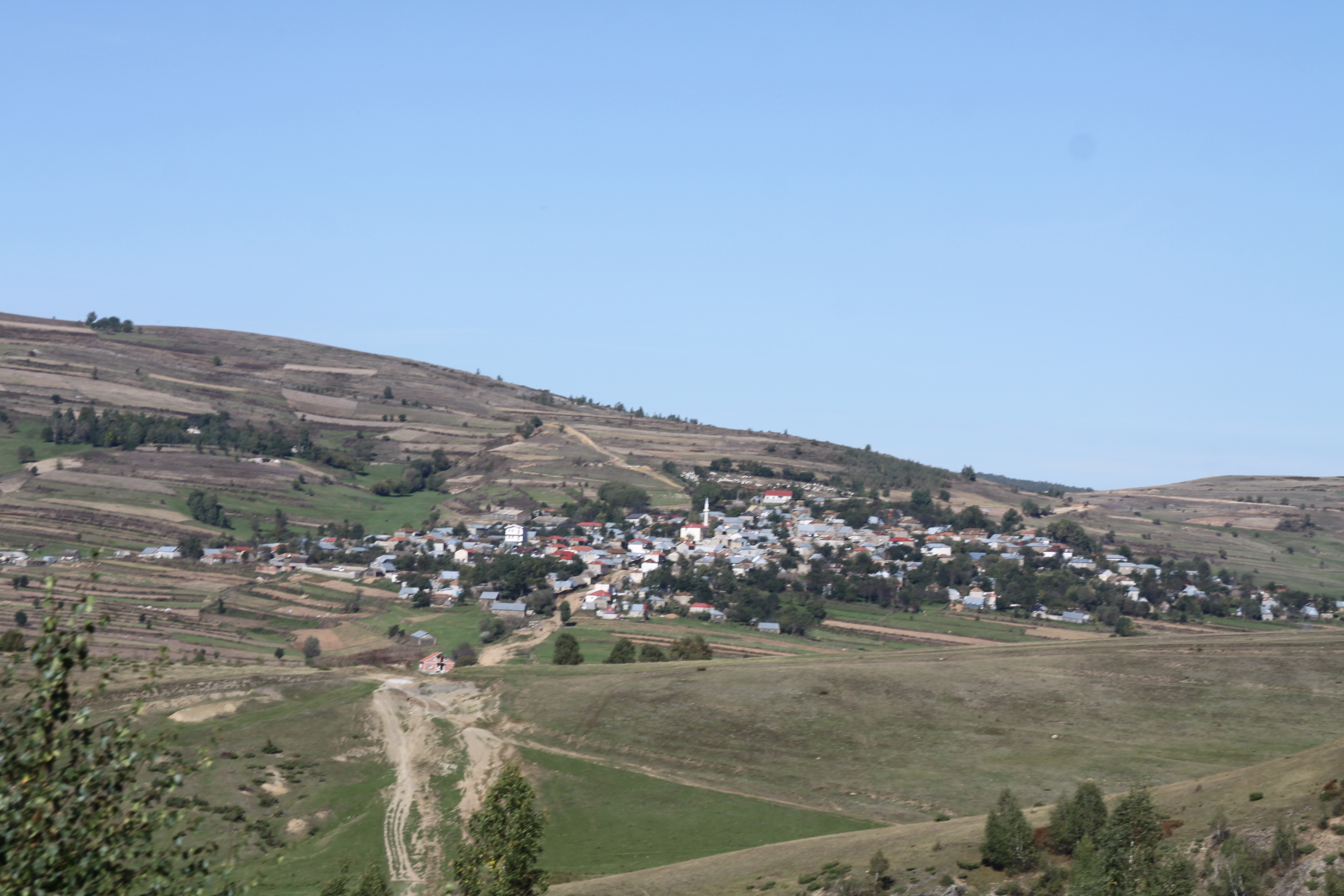
- Novasej is in the Kukës region

- Location within Albania
- Coordinates: 41.9828°N 20.5881°E
- Country: Albania
- County: Kukës
- Municipality: Kukës
- Administrative unit: Shishtavec
- Time zone: UTC+1 (CET)
  - Summer (DST): UTC+2 (CEST)

Novosej is one of the villages of the former Shishtavec Municipality which is part of the Kukës County in Albania. At the 2015 local government reform it became part of the municipality Kukës. Novosej is inhabited by Albanians, whereas many of the surrounding villages are populated by Slavic-speaking Muslims of the Gorani people.

The region was isolated until 1978, when a road was built from Kukës to Shishtavec, which provided a link to the city of Kukës and the national highway. With no subsequent investment in the road, its condition deteriorated, but an initiative in 2012 resulted in it being upgraded, and a 6-kilometre (3.7 mi) extension being built. There were proposals for an additional 15 kilometres (9.3 mi), to open up the area, and this was funded by German development grants. In addition to the road, the initiative, which was administered by the Albanian Development Fund, provided a water supply for Novosej and the nearby villages of Borje, Shtrezë and Oreshkë.

The village is located in the Shishtaveci Alps, an area with hiking trails, forests, and waterfalls, and as well as providing access to Kukës, the road has enabled tourism to develop, while the water supply has assisted the development of agriculture and livestock farming. The establishment of small hotels and other types of accommodation for tourists has become a source of extra income for local people.

The village holds a traditional celebration of "Saint George" each May. This has been encouraged by the Rural Association Support Programme, a not-for-profit organisation established in 1997 to promote sustainable development and tourism in Albania. Several sporting events are held on the first day of the festival, including horse riding, wrestling and football. In the afternoon, "potka" are collected, accompanied by music and dancing. "Potka" consists of fresh leaves from the white birch tree, and these are placed in water, together with eggs, and the water is then used to wash children. After this, the potka are placed in items of importance, such as houses, gardens and cars, and the following morning are taken to agricultural holdings. The 2009 festival was supported by many from other villages in the region, together with visitors from other parts of Albania and abroad.

To the west of the village is the Novosej oak-forest, some 22 hectares (54 acres) of oak woods, situated at an altitude of over 1,400 metres (4,600 ft) above sea level. The trees, of type Quercus Pubescence, have grown there naturally, but at an altitude much higher than is normal for the species. To the south of the village, near to the Lake of Novosej reservoir, is another forest at a similar altitude, this one covering 35 hectares (86 acres) and consisting of birch trees. The extent of the forest is unusual, and such large areas of natural birch forest are only found in the Kukës region, and are on Albania's red list, because the habitat is so rare.

Novosej is very close to the border with Kosovo, and during the Kosovo War of 1998 and 1999, it is estimated that some 3,350 missiles fired in Kosovo crossed the border and landed in the Kukës prefecture. During a prolonged bombardment lasting for 79 days, Novosej was one of 11 villages in Kukës which suffered damage from the stray missiles, as well as 14 in the Has district and 14 in the Tropojë district.

== Bibliography ==
- Niewiadomski, Zbigniew; et al. (2009). "Feasibility Study on Establishing a Transboundary Protected Area" (PDF). UNEP Vienna - ISCC. Archived (PDF) from the original on 28 September 2013.
