= Bogovinje Lake =

Lake in Bogovinje, North Macedonia

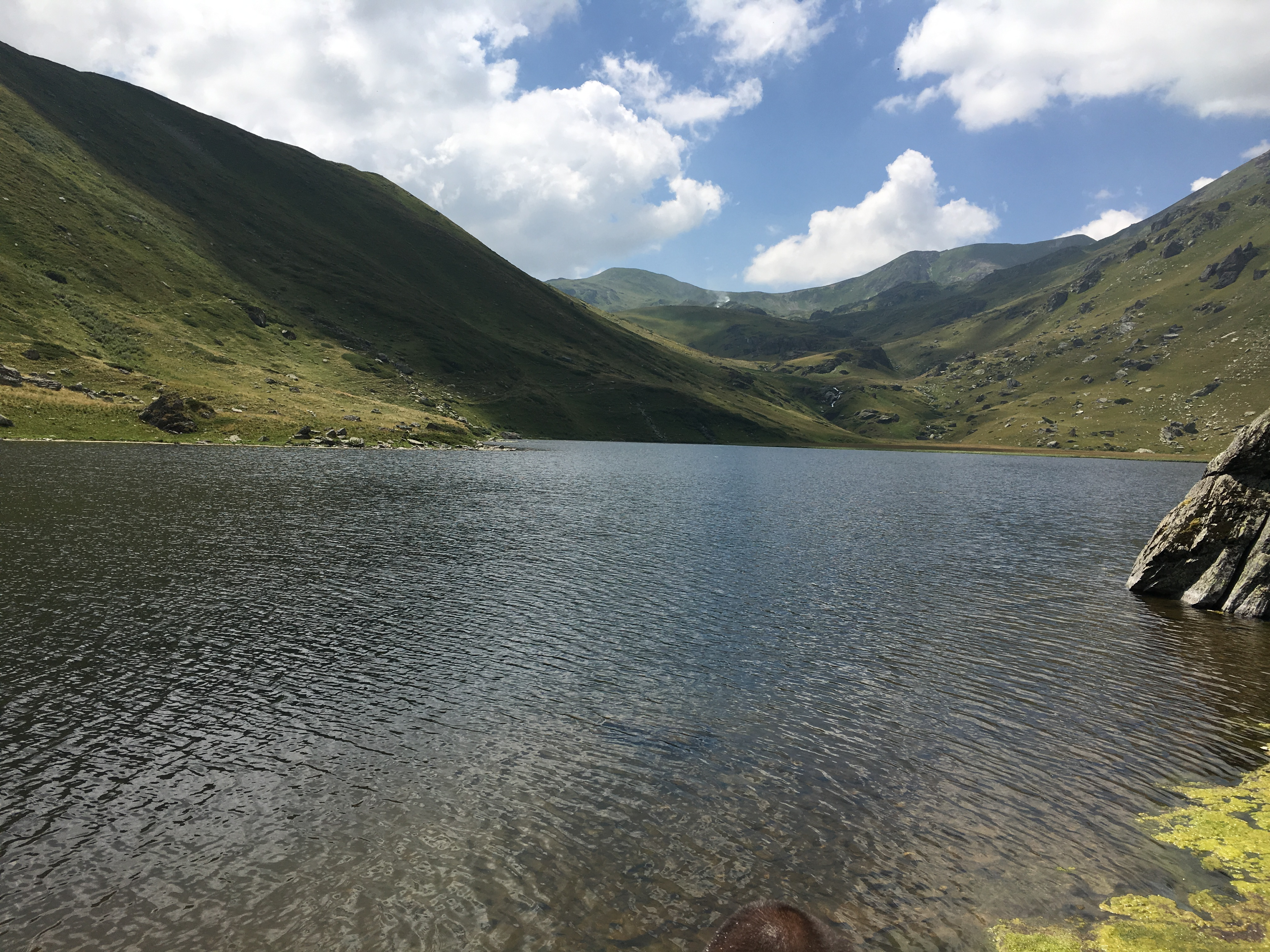
- A view of the lake

- Location within North Macedonia
- Interactive map of Bogovinje Lake
- Location: Bogovinje municipality
- Coordinates: 41°57′02″N 20°47′32″E
- Basin countries: North Macedonia
- Surface area: 0.067 km^{2} (0.026 sq mi)

Bogovinje Lake (Macedonian: Боговинско езеро, Albanian: Liqeni i Bogovinës) is situated in the Bogovinje municipality in the western part of the Republic of North Macedonia. It is one of 39 lakes on Šar mountains and like others boosts tourism in the local area.
