= Orlanci, Aračinovo =

Orlanci Орланци Orllancë
- Village
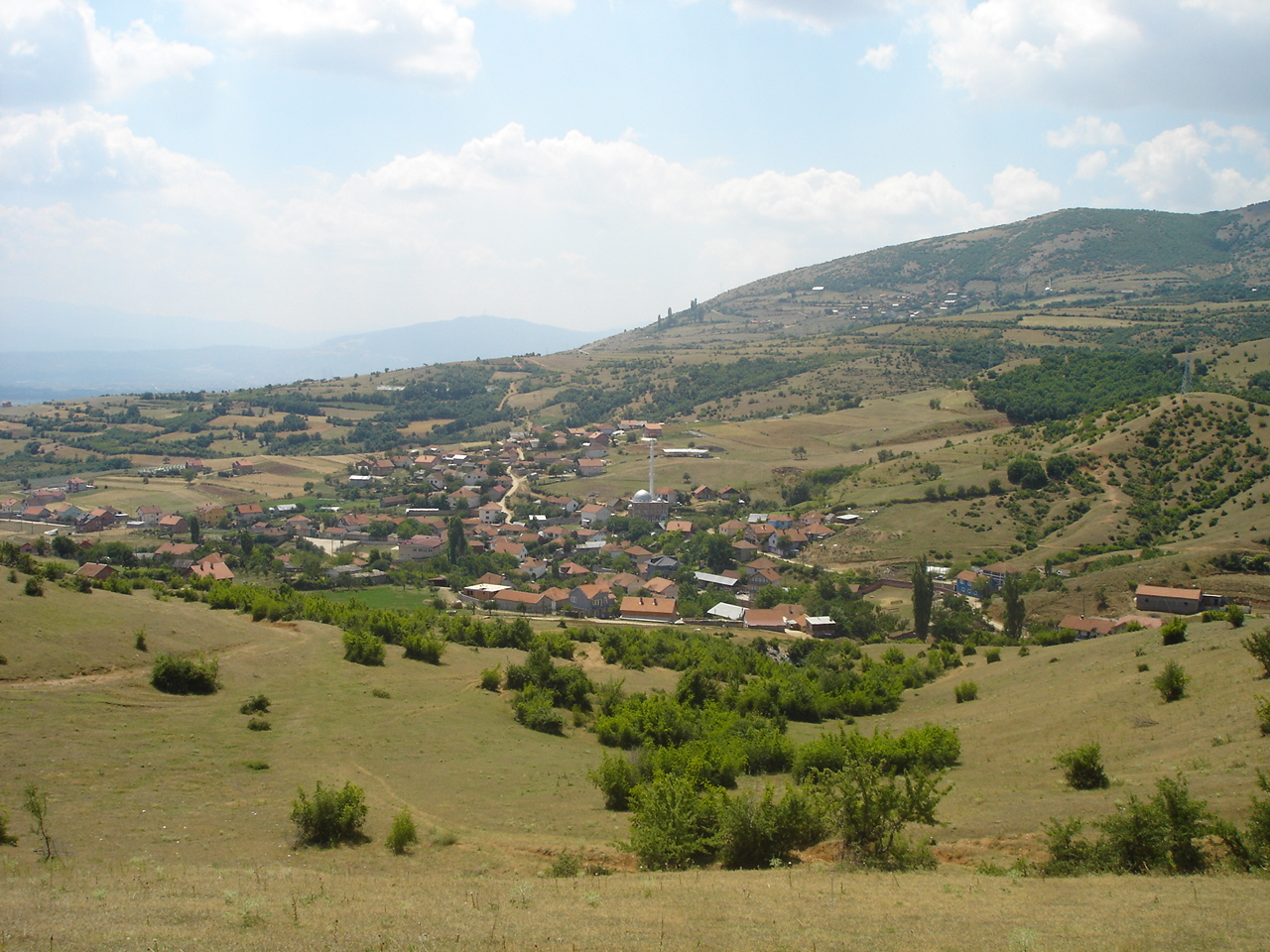
- Orlanci

- Location within North Macedonia
- Coordinates: 42°02′53″N 21°35′30″E
- Country: North Macedonia
- Region: Skopje
- Municipality: Aračinovo
- Elevation: 431 m (1,414 ft)

Population (2021)
  - Total: 890
- Time zone: UTC+1 (CET)
  - Summer (DST): UTC+2 (CEST)
- Postal code: 1045
- Area code: +389-2-XXXXXXX
- Car plates: SK
- Website: .

Orlanci (Macedonian: Орланци, Albanian: Orllancë) is a village in the municipality of Aračinovo, Republic of North Macedonia.

== Demographics ==
According to the 1467-68 Ottoman defter, Orlanci appears as being inhabited by an Orthodox Albanian population. Most of the population have albanian names or surnames.

The names are: Oliver son of Tanush, Tan-ço son of Stamat, poor Tan-o (siromah), poor Goja (siromah), Dejan son of Kalin, Oliver son of Tanush, Tushko son of Oliver.

According to the 2021 census, the village had a total of 890 inhabitants. Ethnic groups in the village include:

- Albanians: 857
- Bosniaks: 4
- Other: 29

| Year | Macedonian | Albanian | Turks | Romani | Vlachs | Serbs | Bosniaks | Others | Total |
|---|---|---|---|---|---|---|---|---|---|
| 2002 | ... | 761 | ... | ... | ... | ... | 63 | 5 | 829 |
| 2021 | ... | 857 | ... | ... | ... | ... | 4 | 29 | 890 |
