= Grušino =

Grušino Грушино Grushinë
- Village
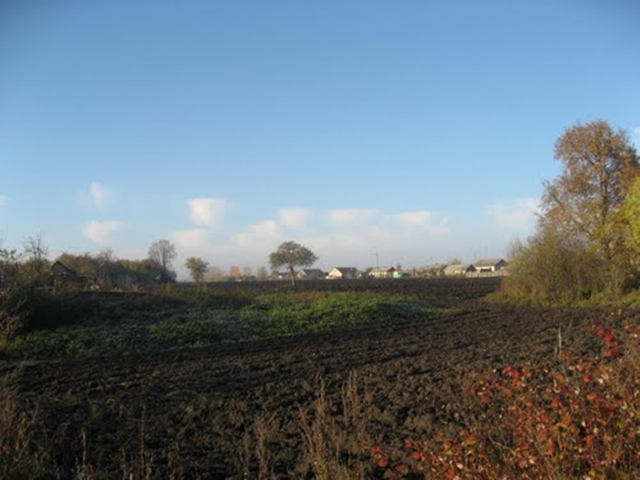
- View of Grušino village

- Location within North Macedonia
- Coordinates: 42°03′39″N 21°37′09″E
- Country: North Macedonia
- Region: Skopje
- Municipality: Aračinovo
- Elevation: 428 m (1,404 ft)

Population (2021)
  - Total: 883
- Time zone: UTC+1 (CET)
  - Summer (DST): UTC+2 (CEST)
- Postal code: 1045
- Area code: +389-2-XXXXXXX
- Car plates: SK
- Website: .

Grušino (Macedonian: Грушино, Albanian: Grushinë) is a village in the municipality of Aračinovo, Republic of North Macedonia.

== Demographics ==
According to the 2021 census, the village had a total of 883 inhabitants. Ethnic groups in the village include:

- Albanians 854
- Macedonians 2
- Others 27

| Year | Macedonian | Albanian | Turks | Romani | Vlachs | Serbs | Bosniaks | Others | Total |
|---|---|---|---|---|---|---|---|---|---|
| 2002 | ... | 1.126 | ... | ... | ... | ... | ... | 2 | 1.128 |
| 2021 | 2 | 854 | ... | ... | ... | ... | ... | 27 | 883 |
