= Aračinovo Municipality =

Municipality of North Macedonia

Coordinates: 42.04°N 21.57°E

Aračinovo Municipality Општина Арачиново Komuna e Haraçinës
- Rural municipality
- Flag Coat of arms

- Country: North Macedonia
- Region: Skopje
- Municipal seat: Aračinovo

Government
  - Mayor: Daut Beqiri (VLEN)

Area
  - Total: 31.3 km^{2} (12.1 sq mi)

Population
  - Total: 12,676
  - Density: 370.51/km^{2} (959.6/sq mi)
- Time zone: UTC+1 (CET)
- Postal code: 1045
- Area code: 02
- Vehicle registration: SK
- Website: Official Website

Aračinovo Municipality (Macedonian: Арачиново [araˈtʃinɔvɔ], Albanian: Komuna e Haraçinës) is a municipality in the northern part of North Macedonia. Aračinovo is also the name of the village where the municipal seat is found. The municipality is located in the Skopje Statistical Region.

== Geography ==
Aračinovo Municipality borders with Lipkovo Municipality to the north, the City of Skopje to the west, Petrovec Municipality to the south and Kumanovo Municipality to the east. The municipality is rural, meaning that all the inhabited places within it are villages. The number of inhabited places in Aračinovo Municipality is 4.

== Demographics ==
The 1994 national census recorded 9,960 inhabitants, while the 2021 North Macedonia census recorded 12,676 inhabitants.

The ethnic structure of the municipality in 2021 was: 12,353 (97.45%) Albanians and 2.55% others.

Demographics of Aračinovo Municipality
Census year	Population
1994	9,960
2002	11,597
2021	12,676

	2002		2021	
	Number	%	Number	%
TOTAL	11,597	100	12,676	100
Albanians	10,879	93.81	12,353	97.45
Macedonians	596	5.14	7	0.06
Bosniaks	65	0.56	4	0.03
Vlachs	1	0.01		
Serbs	10	0.1		
Other / Undeclared / Unknown	46	0.38	2	0.01
Persons for whom data are taken from administrative sources			310	2.45

== Inhabited places ==
There are 4 inhabited places in this municipality.

Inhabited Places	Total	Macedonians	Albanians	Turks	Roma	Aromanians	Serbs	Bosnians	Others
Aračinovo Municipality	12,676	7	12,353	-	-	-	-	4	312
Aračinovo	7.991	4	7.777	-	-	-	-	-	210
Grušino	883	2	854	-	-	-	-	-	27
Mojanci	2.912	1	2.865	-	-	-	-	-	46
Orlanci	890	-	857	-	-	-	-	4	29
