= Mojanci =

Mojanci Мојанци Majancë / Majanca
- Village
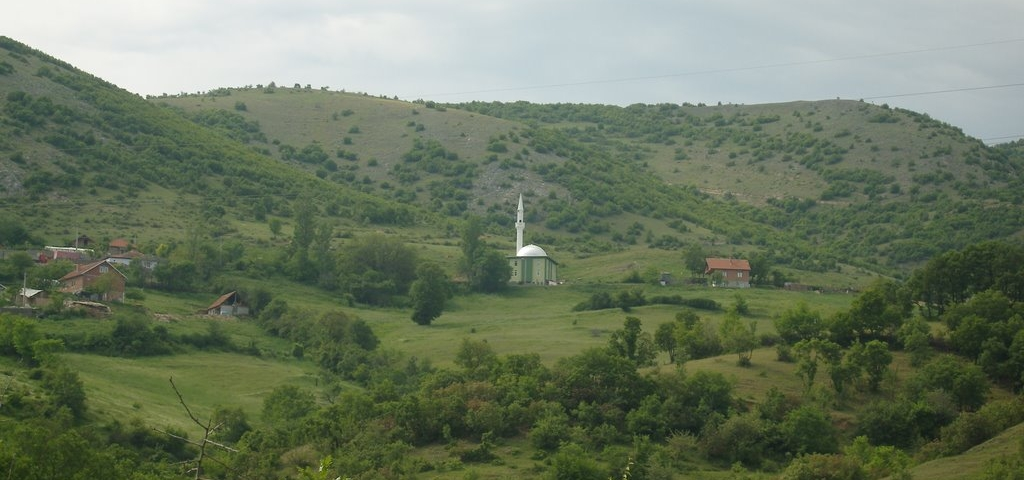
- Mojanci village mosque

- Location within North Macedonia
- Coordinates: 42°02′47″N 21°34′18″E
- Country: North Macedonia
- Region: Skopje
- Municipality: Aračinovo
- Elevation: 428 m (1,404 ft)

Population (2021)
  - Total: 2,912
- Time zone: UTC+1 (CET)
  - Summer (DST): UTC+2 (CEST)
- Postal code: 1045
- Area code: +389-2-XXXXXXX
- Car plates: SK
- Website: .

Mojanci (Macedonian: Мојанци, Albanian: Majanca/Majancë) is a village in the municipality of Aračinovo, North Macedonia.

== Demographics ==
According to the 2021 census, the village had a total of 2.912 inhabitants. Ethnic groups in the village include:

- Albanians 2.865
- Macedonians 1
- Others 46

Year	Macedonian	Albanian	Turks	Romani	Serbs	Others	Total
2002	2	2.315	...	...	...	8	2.325
2021	1	2.865	...	...	...	46	2.912
