= Zapod =

Zapod Запод
- Administrative unit
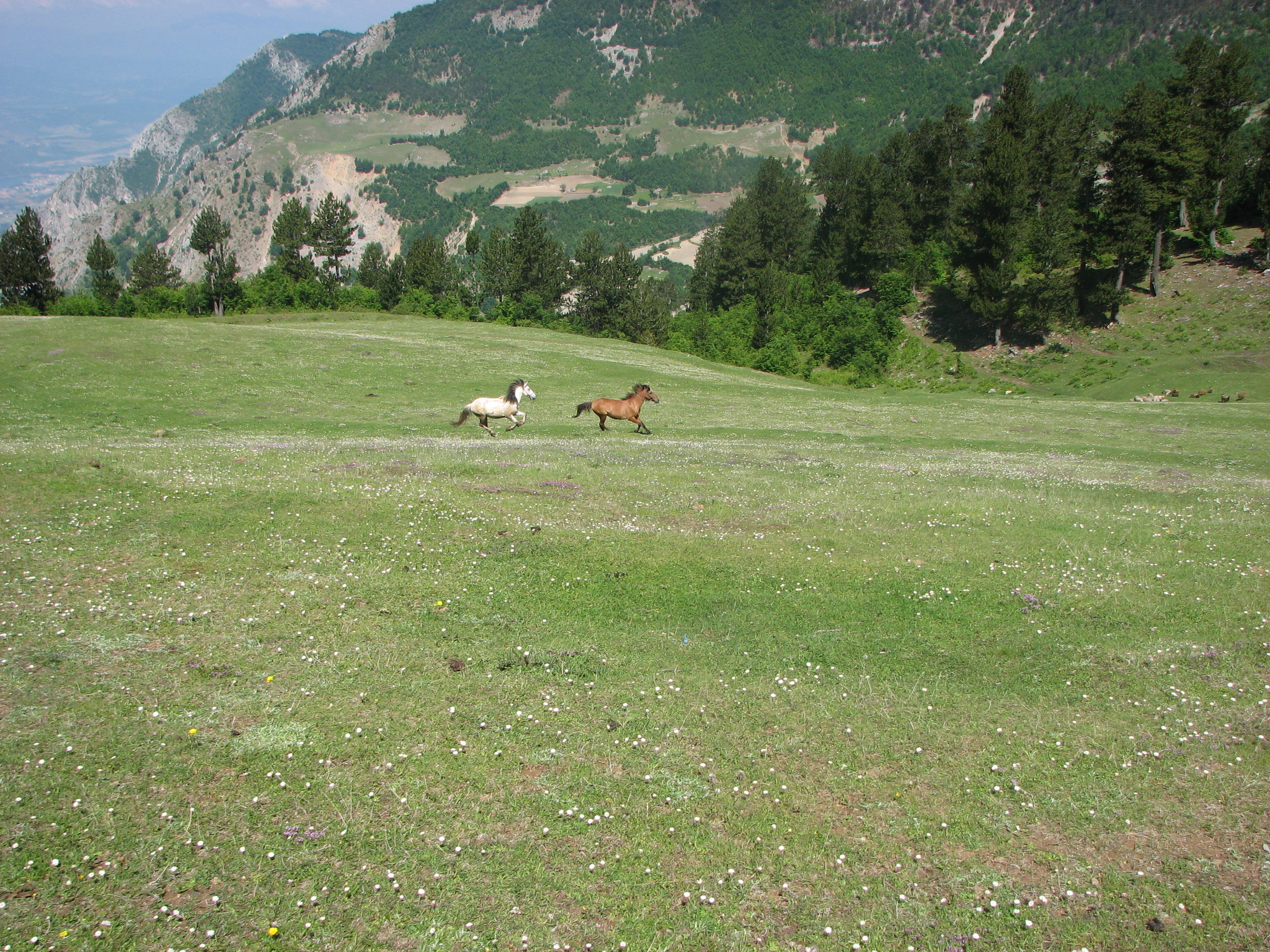
- The lawns of Zapod

- Location within Albania
- Coordinates: 42°3′N 20°33′E
- Country: Albania
- County: Kukës
- Municipality: Kukës

Population (2023)
  - Administrative unit: 1,434
- Time zone: UTC+1 (CET)
  - Summer (DST): UTC+2 (CEST)
- Postal Code: 8515

Zapod is a village and a former municipality in Kukës County, northeastern Albania. At the 2015 local government reform it became a subdivision of the municipality Kukës. The population at the 2023 census was 1,434.

The administrative unit of Zapod contains the villages of Orgjost, Kosharisht, Pakisht, Zapod and Orçikël which are populated by Slavic Muslims, called Gorani, who speak Torlakian (Gora dialect), while the villages of Bele and Lojmë are inhabited by Albanians.

According to the 2011 census, the municipality had 2,217 residents, of whom 80% declared as ethnic Albanians and 11.7% declared as ethnic Macedonians. Per the 2023 census, the population of the two Gorani-inhabited administrative units of Zapod and Shishtavec stood at 3,671 in 9 Gorani and 5 Albanian villages.

== See also ==
Gorani people
Bulgarians in Albania
