= Shishtavec (administrative unit) =

- Administrative unit
- Location within Albania
- Coordinates: 41°59′N 20°36′E
- Country: Albania
- County: Kukës
- Municipality: Kukës

Population (2023)
  - Administrative unit: 2,237
- Time zone: UTC+1 (CET)
  - Summer (DST): UTC+2 (CEST)
- Postal Code: 8517-8519 ^{[a]}
- Website: www.fshatishishtavec.com

Shishtavec (Albanian: Komuna Shishtavec) is a former municipality in Kukës County, Albania. At the 2015 local government reform it became a subdivision of the municipality Kukës. The population at the 2023 census was 2,237.

The municipal unit consists of the following villages:

- Shishtavec
- Novosej
- Kollovoz
- Shtrezë
- Borje
- Oreshkë
- Cërnalevë
