= Vrapčište Municipality =

Municipality of North Macedonia

Coordinates: 41.83°N 20.86°E

Municipality of Vrapčište Општина Врапчиште Komuna e Vrapçishtit
- Coat of arms

- Country: North Macedonia
- Region: Polog
- Municipal seat: Vrapčište

Government
  - Mayor: Isen Shabani (AA)

Population
  - Total: 19,842
- Time zone: UTC+1 (CET)
- Vehicle registration: GV
- Website: Official Website

Vrapčište (Macedonian: Врапчиште, Albanian: Vrapçisht) is a municipality in western North Macedonia. Vrapčište is also the name of the village where the municipal seat is found. This municipality is part of the Polog Statistical Region.

== Geography ==
The municipality borders Bogovinje Municipality to the north, Brvenica Municipality to the east, and Gostivar Municipality to the south, Kosovo to the west.

== Demographics ==
According to the 2021 North Macedonia census, this municipality has 19,842 inhabitants. Ethnic groups in the municipality include:

	2002		2021	
	Number	%	Number	%
TOTAL	25,399	100	19,842	100
Albanians	21,101	83.08	15,109	76.15
Turks	3,134	12.34	3,099	15.62
Macedonians	1,041	4.1	875	4.41
Bosniaks	8	0.04	9	0.05
Serbs	4	0.02	6	0.03
Roma			3	0.01
Other / Undeclared / Unknown	111	0.42	7	0.03
Persons for whom data are taken from administrative sources			734	3.7
