= Bogovinje Municipality =

Municipality of North Macedonia

Bogovinje Municipality Општина Боговиње Komuna e Bogovinës
- Rural municipality
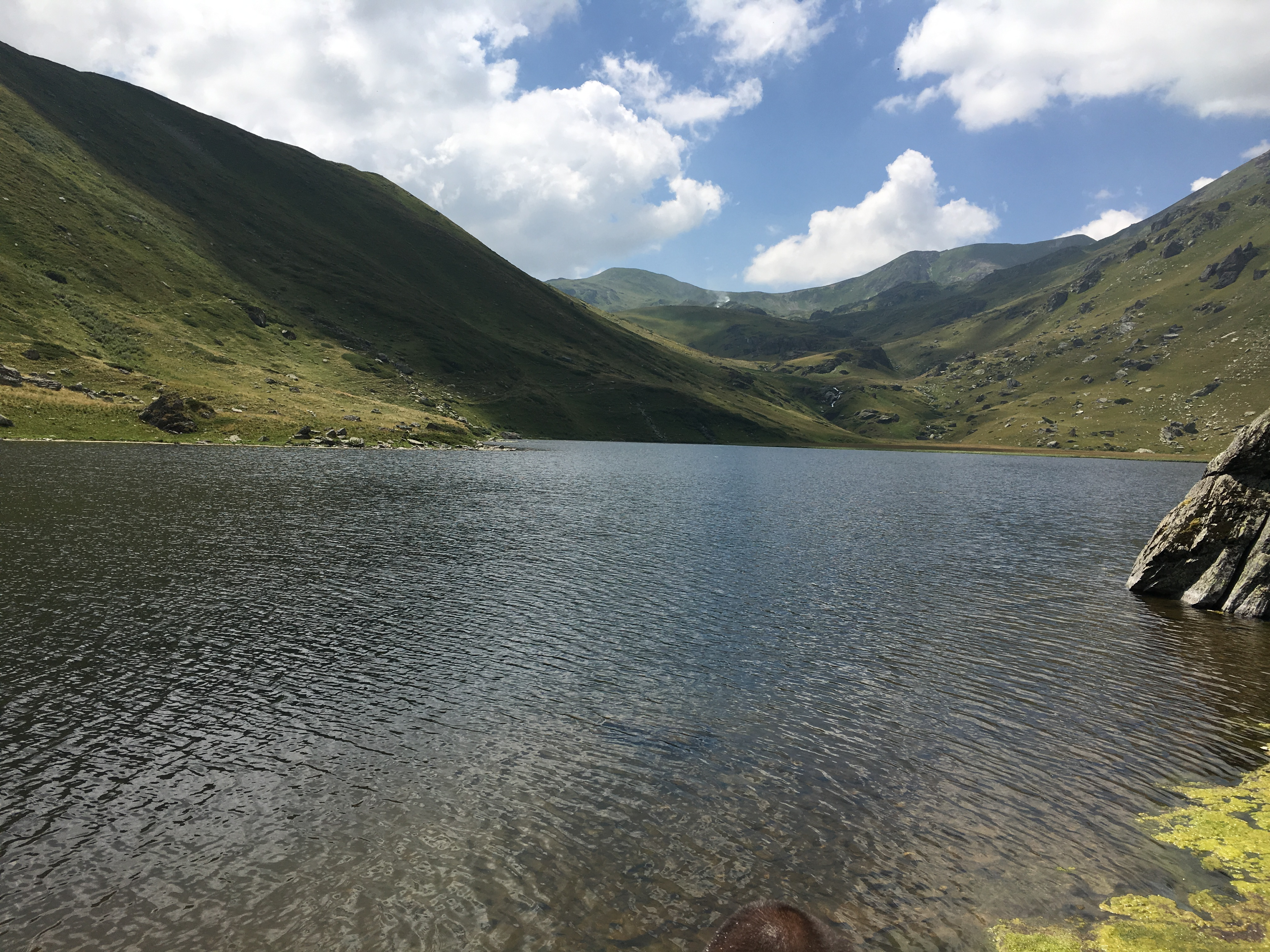
- Bogovinje Lake

- Flag Coat of arms

- Coordinates: 41°56′N 20°55′E
- Country: North Macedonia
- Region: Polog
- Municipal seat: Bogovinje

Government
  - Mayor: Feti Abazi (VLEN)

Population
  - Total: 22,906
- Time zone: UTC+1 (CET)
- Vehicle registration: TE
- Website: Official Website

Bogovinje (Macedonian: Боговиње, Albanian: Komuna e Bogovinës) is a municipality in the western part of the Republic of North Macedonia. Bogovinje is also the name of the village where the municipal seat is found. Bogovinje Municipality is part of the Polog Statistical Region.

== Geography ==
The municipality borders Tetovo Municipality to the north, Brvenica Municipality to the east, Vrapčište Municipality to the south, and Kosovo to the west.

== Demographics ==
The number of the inhabited places in the municipality is 15. According to the 2021 North Macedonia census, this municipality has 22,906 inhabitants.

| | 2002 | | 2021 | |
| | Number | % | Number | % |
| TOTAL | 28,997 | 100 | 22,906 | 100 |
| Albanians | 27,614 | 95.23 | 20,475 | 89.39 |
| Turks | 1,183 | 4.08 | 803 | 3.51 |
| Macedonians | 37 | 0.13 | 16 | 0.07 |
| Bosniaks | 9 | 0.03 | 6 | 0.03 |
| Serbs | 1 | 0.003 | 2 | 0.01 |
| Vlachs | | | 1 | 0.005 |
| Roma | 5 | 0.02 | | |
| Other / Undeclared / Unknown | 148 | 0.507 | 36 | 0.145 |
| Persons for whom data are taken from administrative sources | | | 1,567 | 6.84 |
