= Lake Gramë =

Albanian glacial lake situated in the eastern Korab Mountains

Gramë Lake
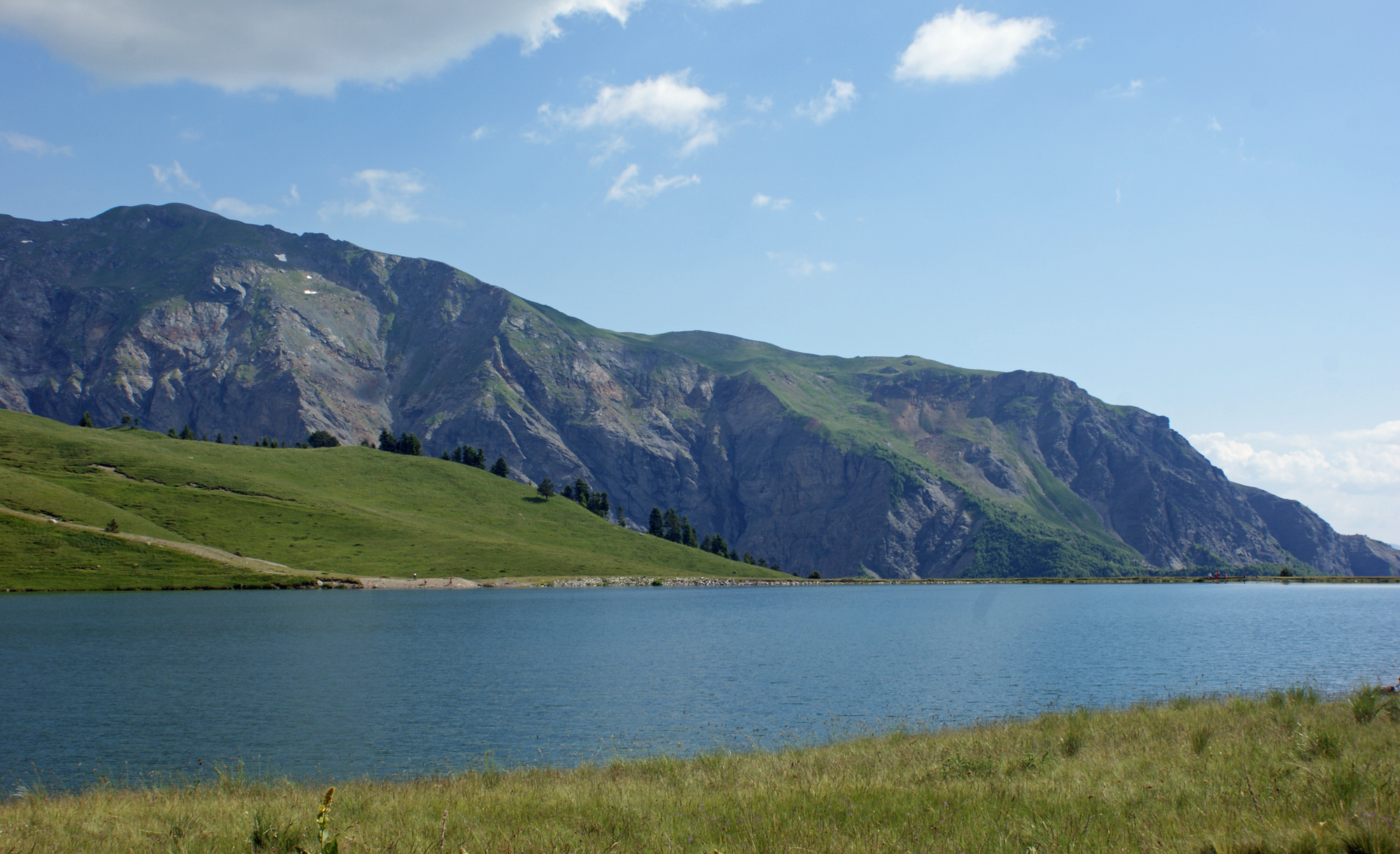
- Northern view with Mali i Gramës in the background

- Location within Albania Location within Balkans
- Interactive map of Gramë Lake
- Location: Korab Mountains
- Coordinates: 41°45′34″N 20°29′35″E
- Lake type: glacial lake
- Basin countries: Albania
- Max. length: 450 m (1,480 ft)
- Max. width: 280 m (920 ft)
- Surface area: 0.05 km^{2} (0.019 sq mi)
- Surface elevation: 1,750 m (5,740 ft)

Gramë Lake (Albanian: Liqeni i Gramës) is a glacial lake situated in the eastern Korab Mountains, close to the Mount Korab and Mali i Gramës in Albania, spanning an area of 5 ha (0.050 km^{2}). It is also the largest and deepest lake within the mountain range. The lake is located 1,750 metres elevation above sea level. Their shores are steep and rocky. It takes water from rainfall, and snowfall. The biggest amount of water can be observed in the late spring, which is due to melting of the snow on the surrounding peaks.

== See also ==
- Korab-Koritnik Nature Park
- Geography of Albania
- Lakes of Albania
