= Koritnik =

Mountain in Albania and Kosovo

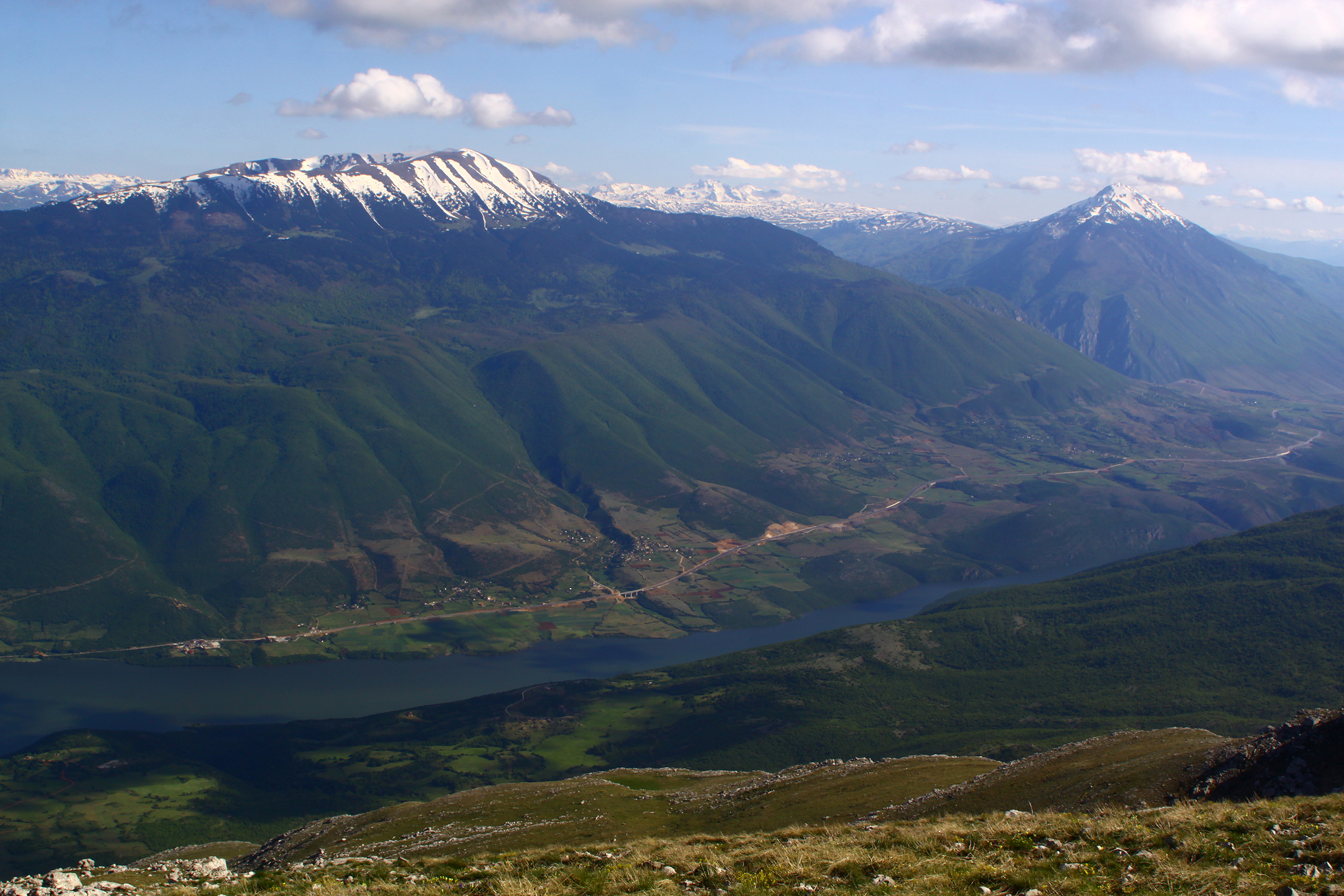
- Mount Koritnik on the left from Pashtrik

Highest point
- Elevation: 2,396 m (7,861 ft)
- Listing: Ultra
- Coordinates: 42°5′0″N 20°34′0″E

Geography
- Location within Kosovo
- Location: Kukës, Albania; Prizren, Kosovo
- Parent range: Korab Mountains

Geology
- Rock age: Triassic
- Mountain type: Limestone

Koritnik (Albanian definite form: Koritniku) is a wooded, limestone mountain, located in northeastern Albania and southwest Kosovo between the cities of Kukës and Prizren. The mountain is entirely surrounded by branches of the White Drin river. The highest point of Koritnik massif, Maja e Pikëllimës reaches an elevation of 2,393 metres (7,851 ft) above the Adriatic. Gryka e Vanavës (English: Vanave Gorge) separates the mountain from Gjallica. The gorge is 3.5 km (2.2 mi) long, 30 m (100 ft) wide, and about 300 m (980 ft) deep.

The massif falls within the Balkan mixed forests terrestrial ecoregion of the Palearctic temperate broadleaf and mixed forests biome. The slopes of the mountain meadows are mostly covered with coniferous forests. The high pastures of the Koritnik mountain help sustain a population of around 60 chamois.

Koritnik is also part of the Korab-Koritnik Nature Park, forming the European Green Belt. It has been recognized as an Important Plant Area of international importance by Plantlife.

Gallery
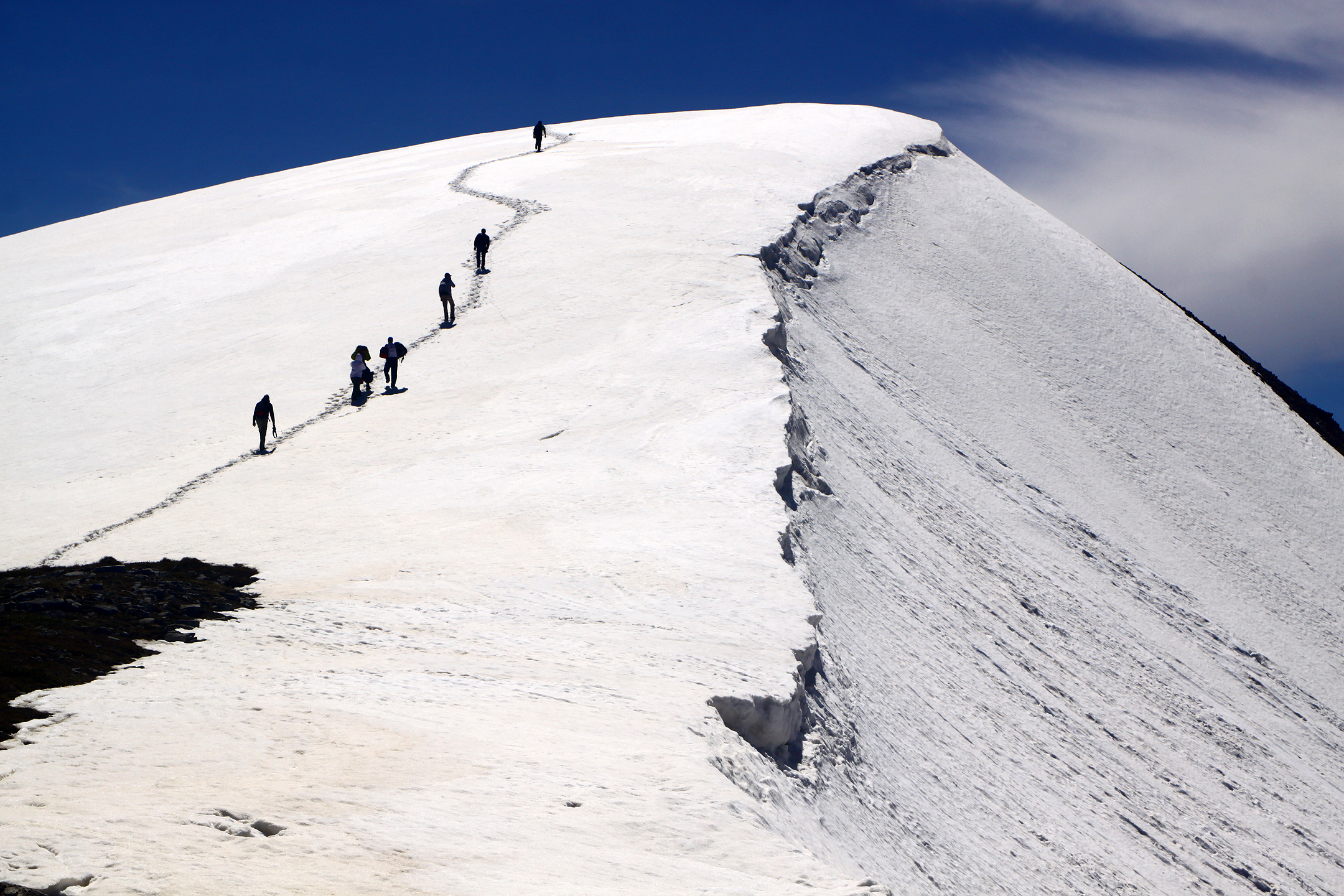
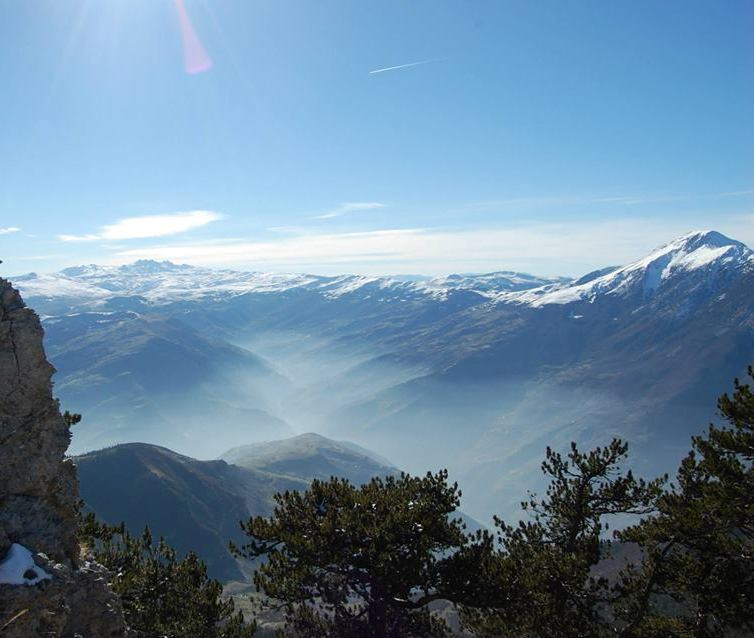
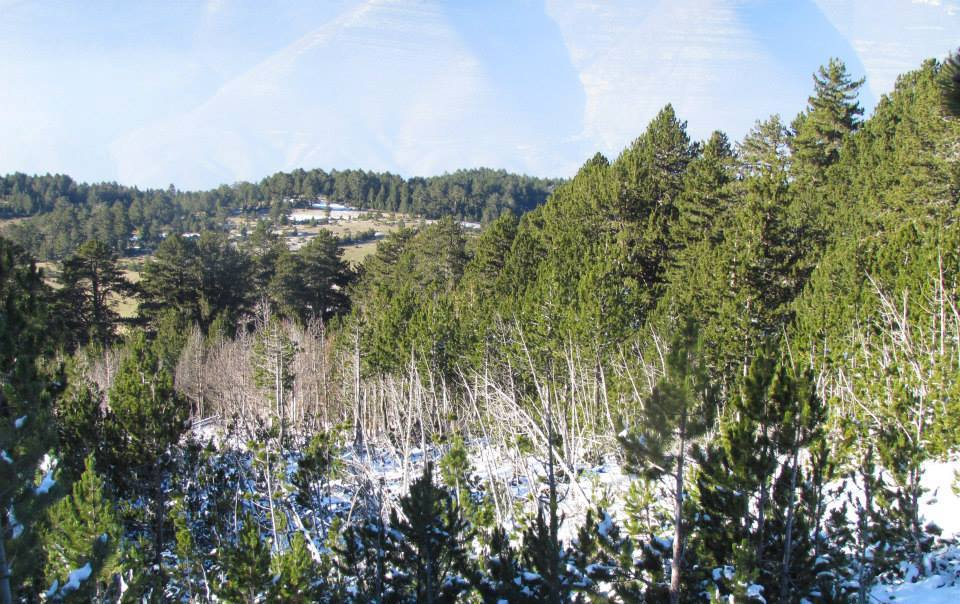

== See also ==
- Korab-Koritnik Nature Park
- Geography of Albania
- Mountains of Albania
