= Big Korab Gate =

Mountain pass between Albania and North Macedonia

Coordinates: 41.815°N 20.565°E

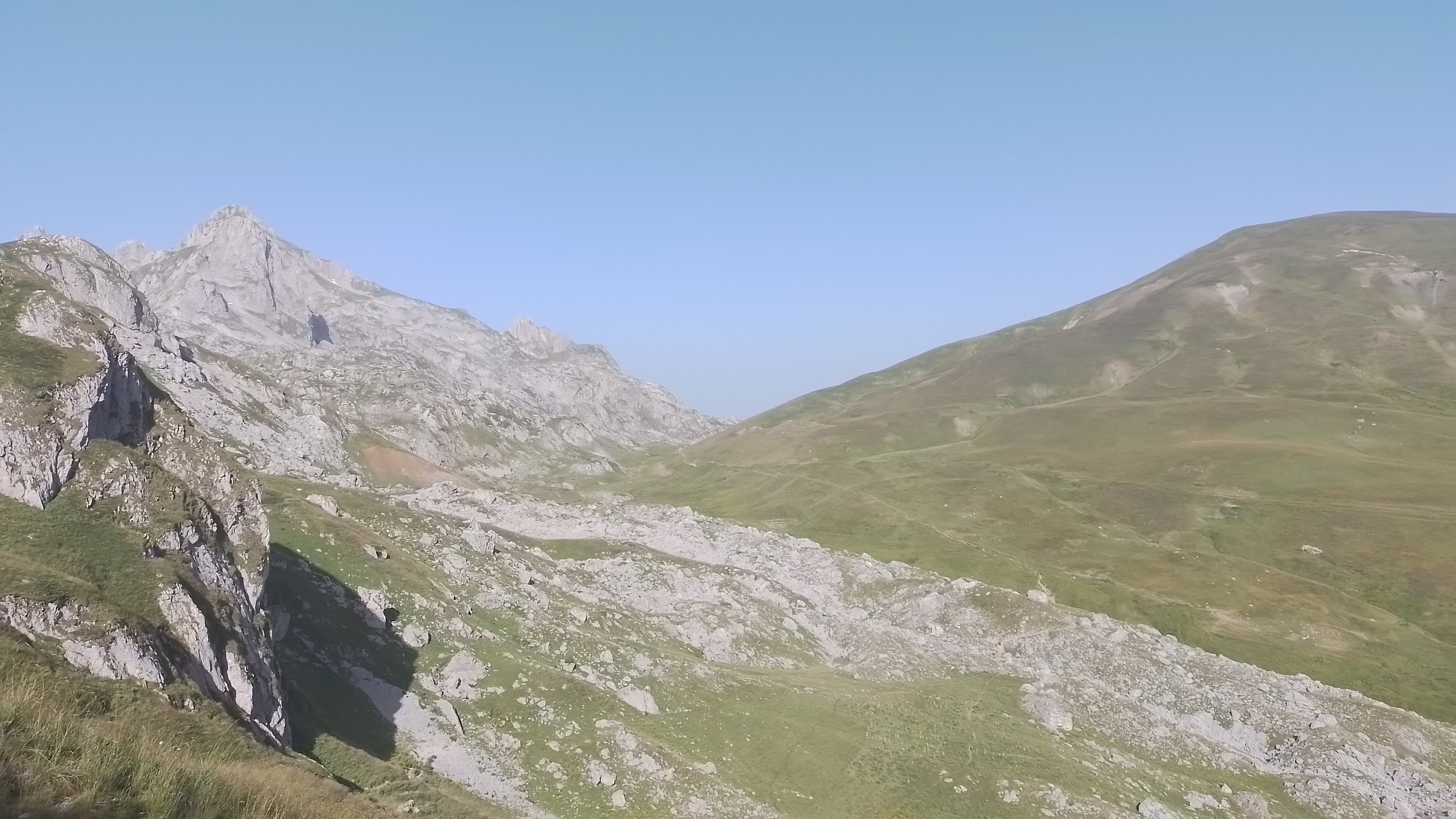
- Interactive map of Big Korab Gate
- Elevation: 2,062 m (6,765 ft)

Big Korab Gate (Albanian: Porta e Korabit të Madh; Macedonian: Голема Корапска Врата, romanized: Golema Korabska Vrata) is a mountain pass on the northern slopes of Mount Korab. It is located on the border of Albania and North Macedonia.

Big Korab Gate reaches a height of 2,062 m (6,765 ft), 702 meters lower than Mount Korab's highest point, 2,764 m (9,068 ft), and 403 meters lower than Small Korab Gate on the southern slope of the summit.
