= Maja e Pikëllimës =

Summit on the border of Albania and Kosovo

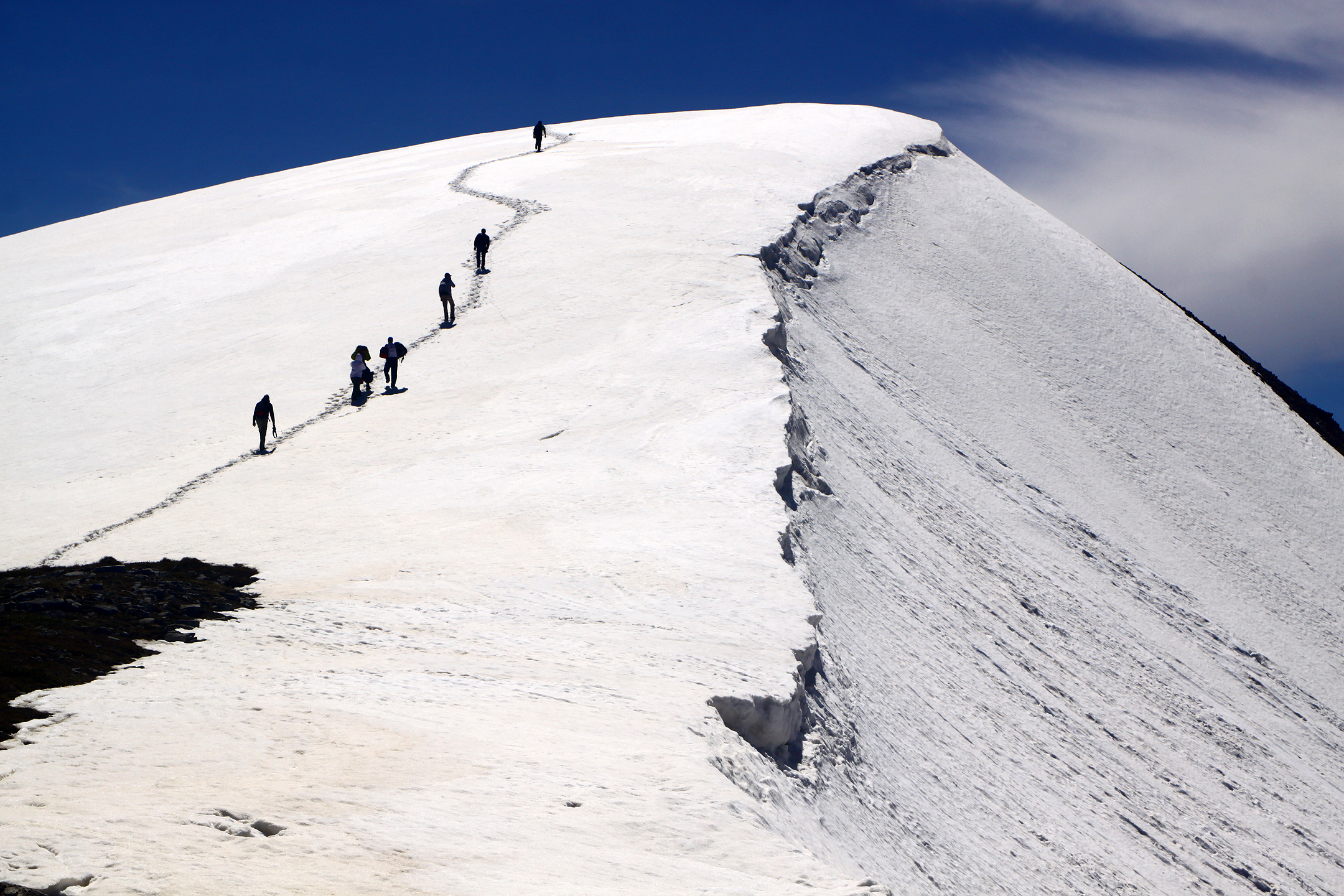
- View of the summit

Highest point
- Elevation: 2,393 m (7,851 ft)
- Prominence: 1,400 m (4,600 ft)
- Isolation: 9.9 km (6.2 mi)
- Listing: Ribu
- Coordinates: 42°04′49″N 20°33′23″E

Naming
- English translation: Sorrow Peak

Geography
- Location within Albania Location within Kosovo
- Countries: Albania; Kosovo
- Region: Central Mountain Region
- Municipality: Kukës, Dragash
- Parent range: Koritnik

Geology
- Rock age: Triassic
- Mountain type: summit
- Rock type: limestone

Maja e Pikëllimës (lit. 'Sorrow Peak') is a summit of the Koritnik massif in northeastern Albania, near the border with Kosovo. With an elevation of 2,393 m (7,851 ft) above sea level, it represents the highest point of the entire Koritnik ridgeline, which connects both countries.

== Topography ==
Located southwest of Gjallica and west of Pashtrik, Maja e Pikëllimës features a broad and relatively even relief, without significant rock walls or abrupt escarpments that would hinder ascent. As such, it is suitable for hikers seeking to reach high elevations without extreme technical difficulty.

The vantage point from atop the summit offers wide panoramic views, making it an attractive destination for landscape photography as well as for observing alpine flora and fauna.

== Climbing route ==
The summit can be reached either from Zapod in Albania or from Rapçë in Kosovo. The latter route follows an unpaved track for approximately 6.7 km, maintaining an elevation of around 1,060 meters, before turning northward. Snow cover begins at about 1,850 meters. Beyond this point, the marked trail disappears and the ascent continues directly uphill until reaching the ridge at 8.3 km. From there, a further 2 km along the ridge leads to the top of the summit.

The ascent covers a total one-way distance of 10.2 km, with an elevation gain of 1,400 meters and requires approximately seven hours and thirty minutes to complete.

== See also ==
- List of mountains in Albania
- List of mountains in Kosovo
