= Korab-Koritnik Nature Park =

Protected area and a tourist attraction in Albania

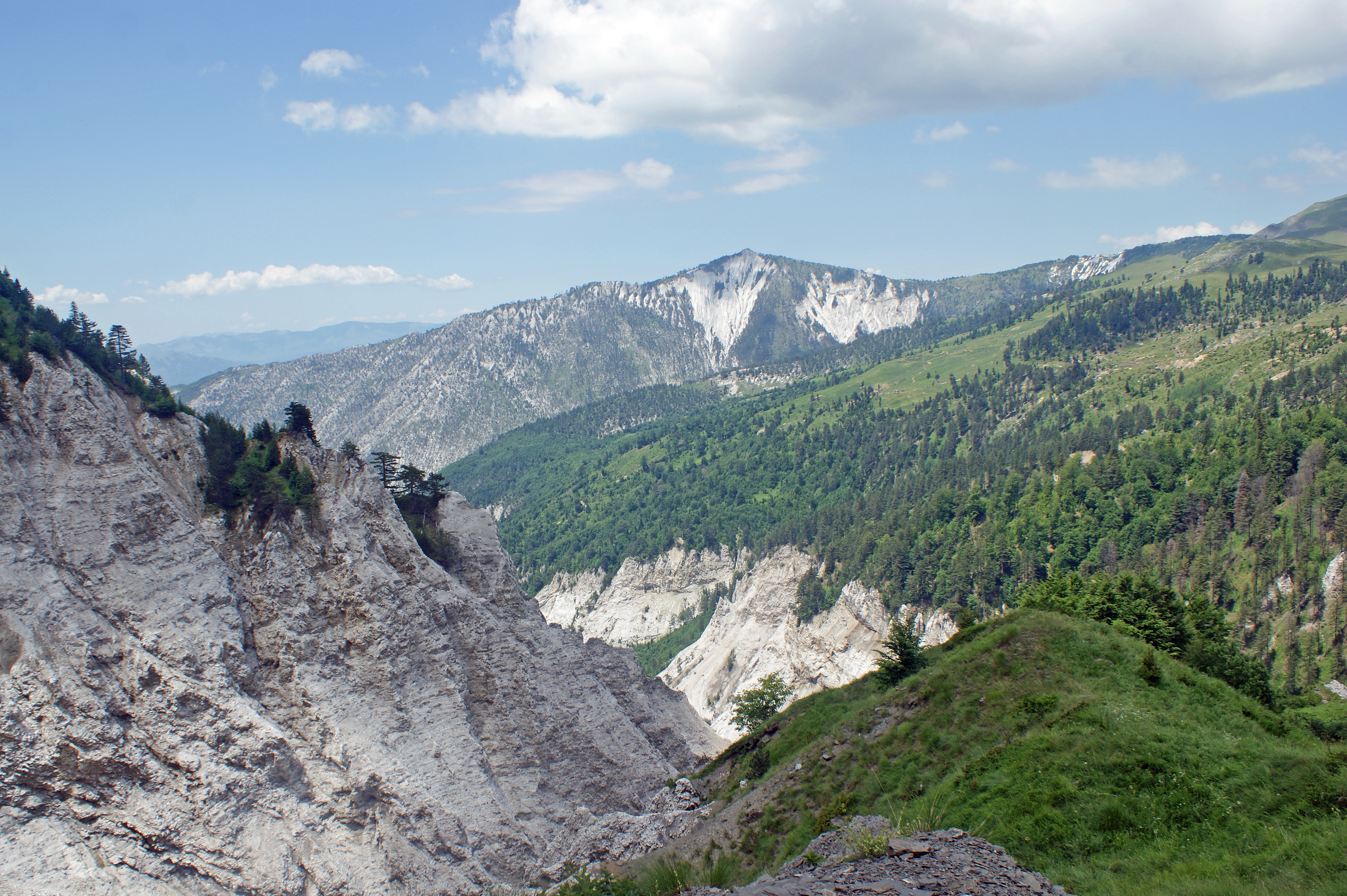
- Mali i Bardhë

- Location within Albania
- Location: Dibër County and Kukës County
- Nearest city: Kukës and Peshkopi
- Coordinates: 41°47′N 20°33′E
- Area: 55,550 hectares (555.5 km^{2})
- Established: 21 December 2011
- Governing body: National Agency of Protected Areas

The Korab-Koritnik Nature Park (Albanian: Parku Natyror i Korab-Koritnikut) is a nature park in eastern Albania and forms a section of the European Green Belt, which serves as a retreat for endangered animal and plant species. It encompasses 55,550 hectares (555.5 km^{2}) of alpine mountainous terrain, with valleys, rivers, glacial lakes, caves, canyons and dense coniferous and deciduous forest. The International Union for Conservation of Nature (IUCN) has listed the park as Category IV. Koritnik and Korab have each been recognised as an Important Plant Area of international importance by Plantlife.

The Korab-Koritnik Nature Park starts on the frontier with Kosovo in the north along the border with North Macedonia to the Desha Mountains in the south. The nature park is named after the Korab Mountains and Koritnik Mountain. Korab is the highest summit of both Albania and North Macedonia, standing at an elevation of 2,764 metres (9,068 ft). It is also one of only two summits in Europe, which is the highest point for more than one country and as well the 18th-most prominent mountain peak in Europe. The summit is a very rugged mountain massif and consists mainly of shale and limestone of the Paleozoic period with block structures and also severely damaged gypsum rocks of permo Triassic. On the west side, the mountain falls steeply over rock walls, while the north side consists of craggy rocks.

The nature park experiences a moderate humid continental climate with wet cold winters and dry hot summers. Due to a great variability in elevation, a rich diversity of climates, flora and fauna can be found within the territory. It falls within the Dinaric Mountains mixed forests and Balkan mixed forests terrestrial ecoregions of the Palearctic temperate broadleaf and mixed forests biome. The forests are composed by diverse species of deciduous and coniferous trees and a great variety of wildflowers. The levels of the vegetation are distinguished based on different altitudes, oak forests from 400 to 900 metres (1,300–3,000 ft), conifers and beech forests with mixed broadleaved forests from 1,000 to 2,000 metres (3,300–6,600 ft) above sea level. The slopes of the mountain meadows are mostly covered with deciduous forests. The most common types of tree in the park are silver fir, austrian pine, bosnian pine, macedonian pine and black alder. Oak forests can be found on the lower altitudes including the oriental hornbeam, downy oak, macedonian oak and field maple.

The fauna is represented by 37 species of mammals. Large mammals such as the brown bear, grey wolf, balkan lynx, roe deer, wild boar, weasel, pine marten, and red squirrel can be found in the area. It also contains a variety of suitable habitats that support dense populations of birds such as the golden eagle, western capercaillie, peregrine falcon, common buzzard, accipiter, eagle-owl, griffon vulture, hazel grouse and many other.

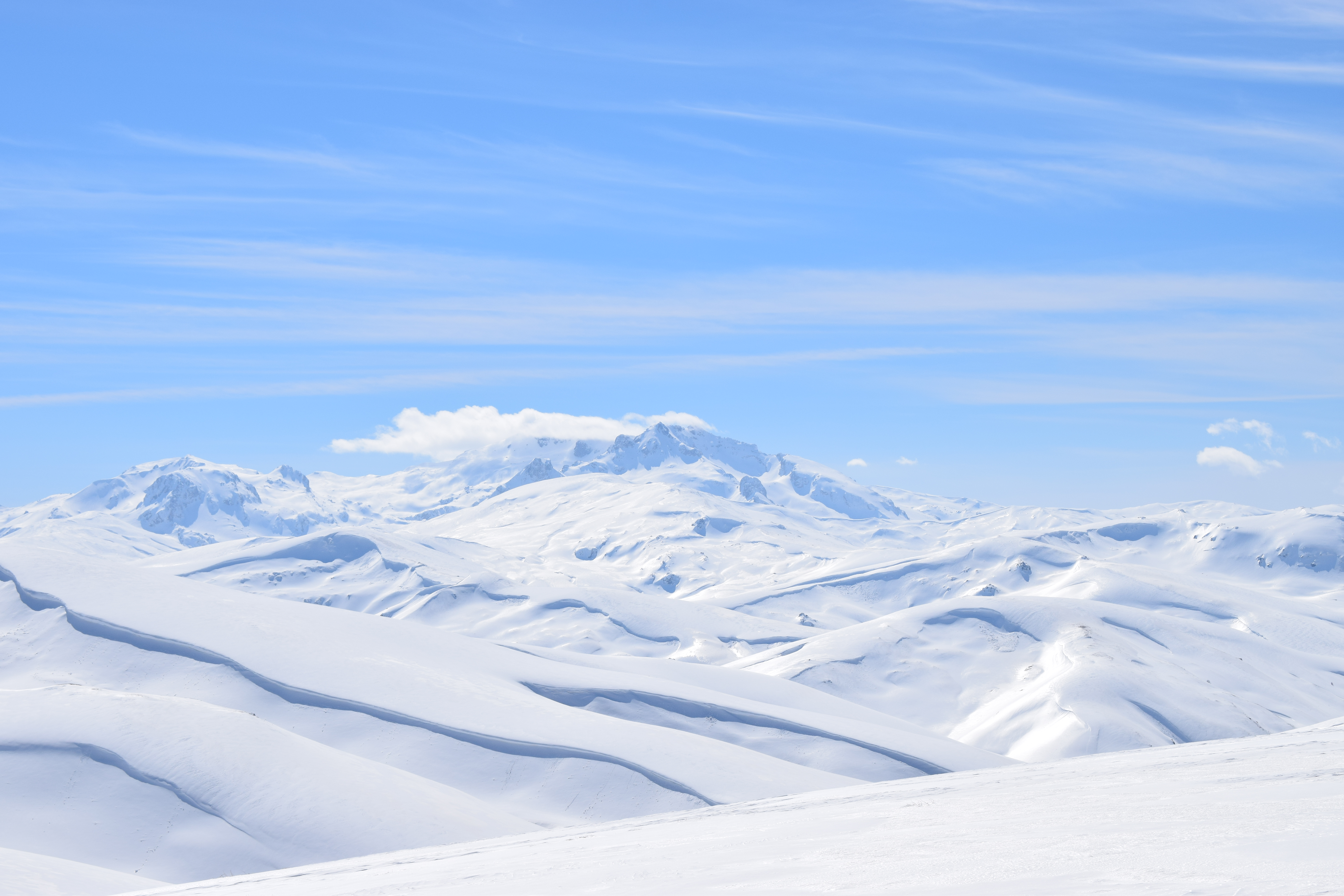
Korab Mountains

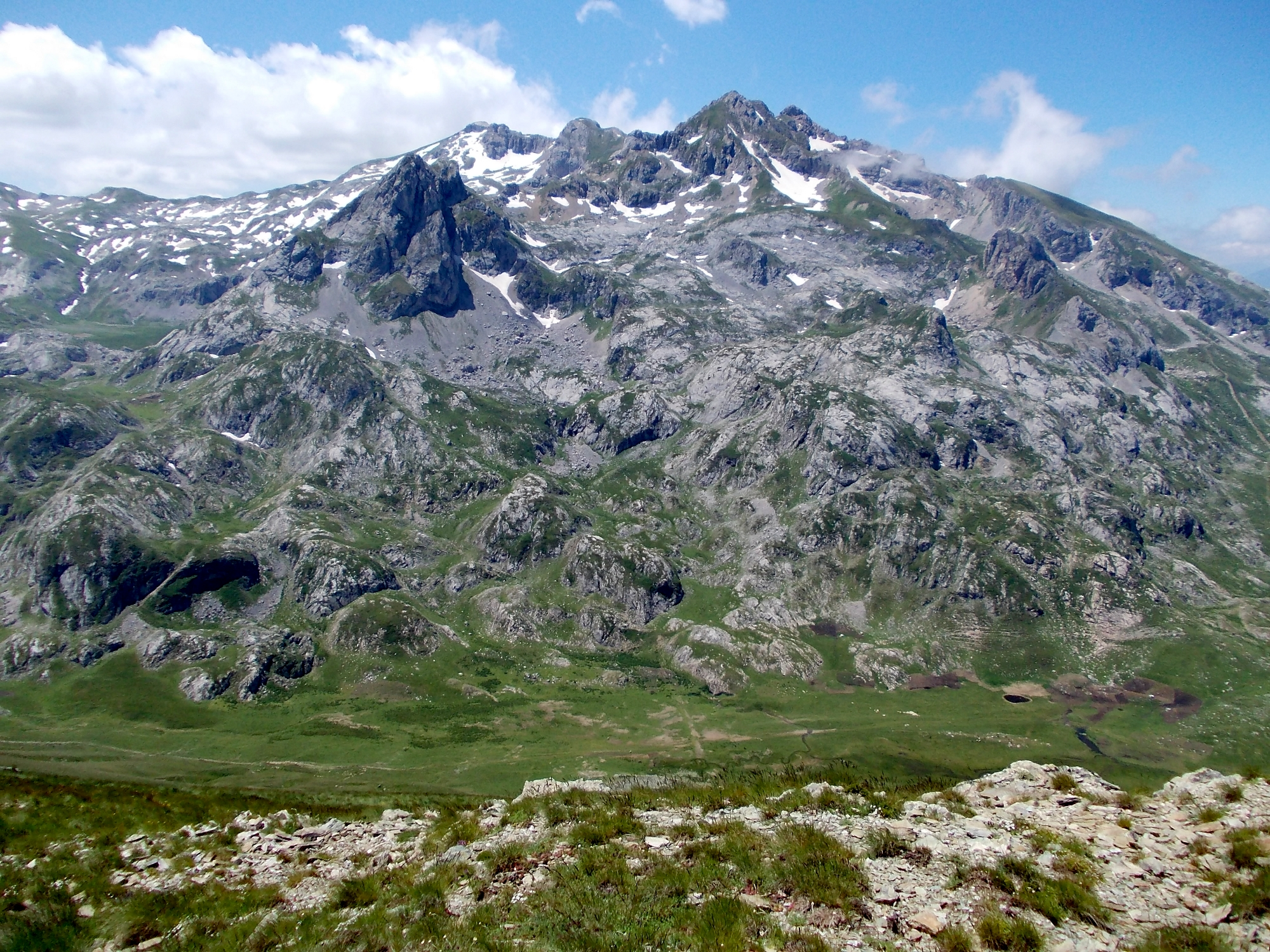
Korab

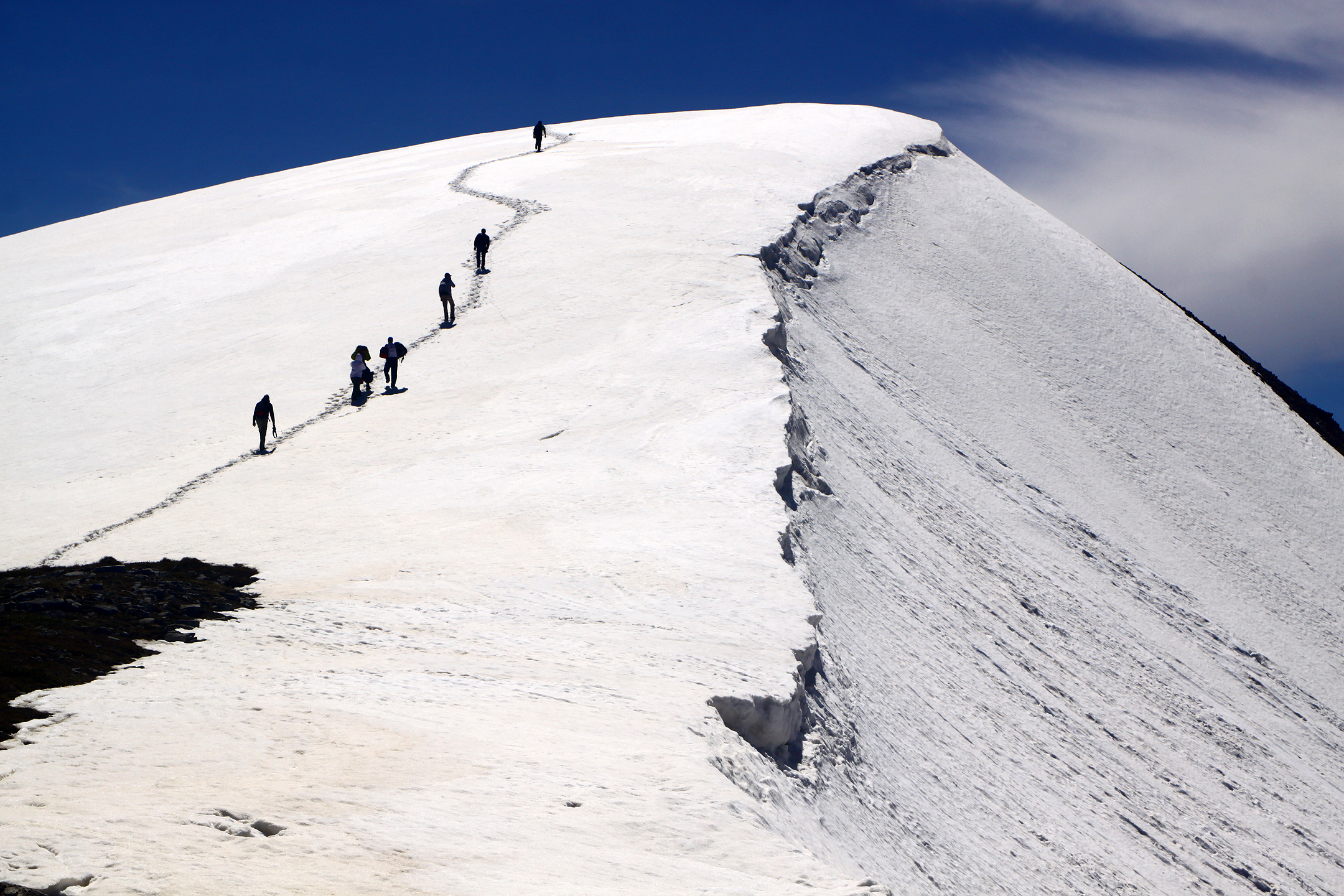
Near the highest peak of Koritnik, Maja e Pikëllimës

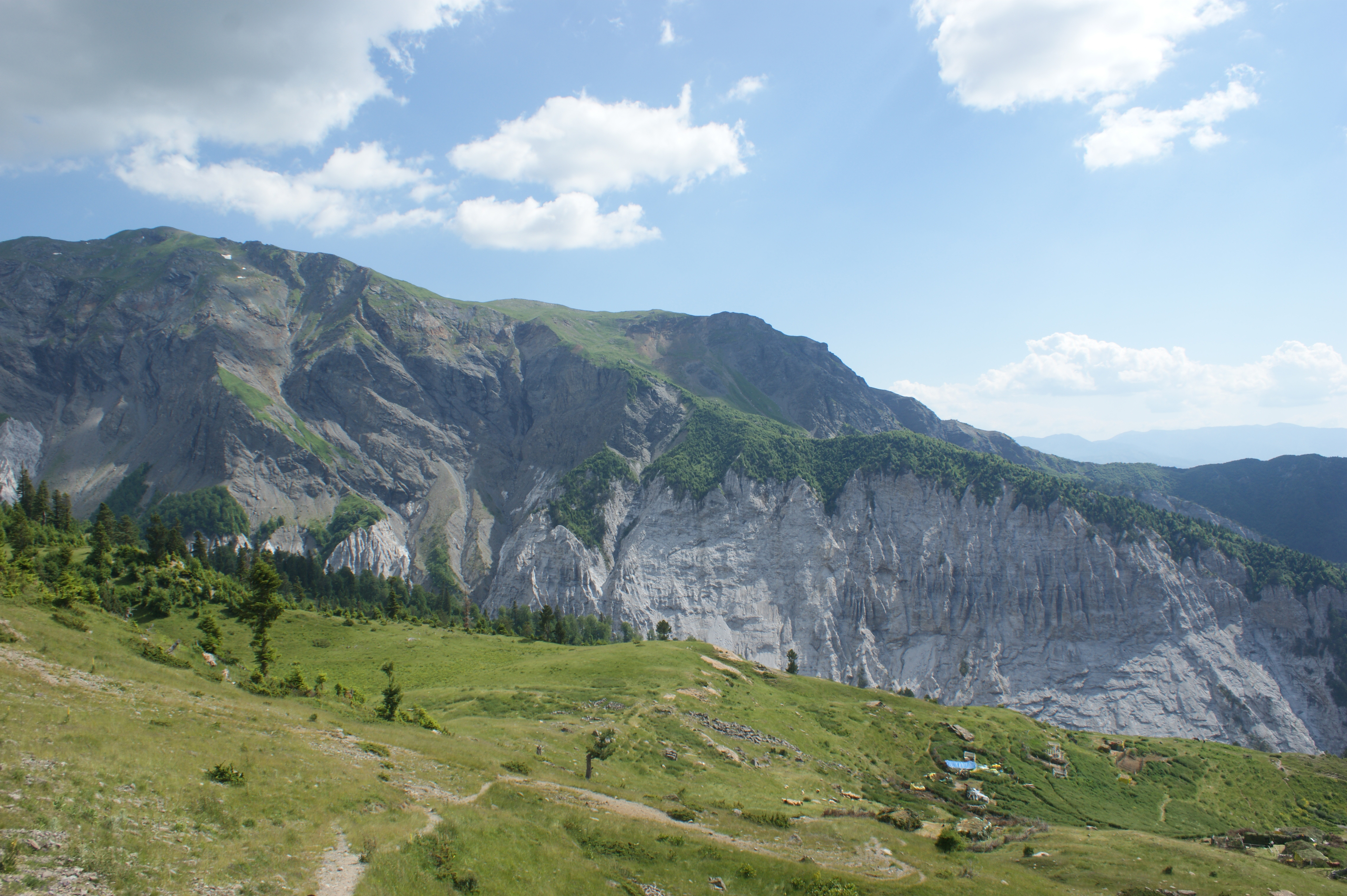
Mali i Gramës

== See also ==
- Korab & Mount Korab
- Koritnik
- Protected areas of Albania
- Geography of Albania
- Krahina Malore Qëndrore
- Lure-Dejes Mt National Park
