= Little Korab Gate =

Mountain pass between Albania and North Macedonia

Coordinates: 41.788°N 20.542°E

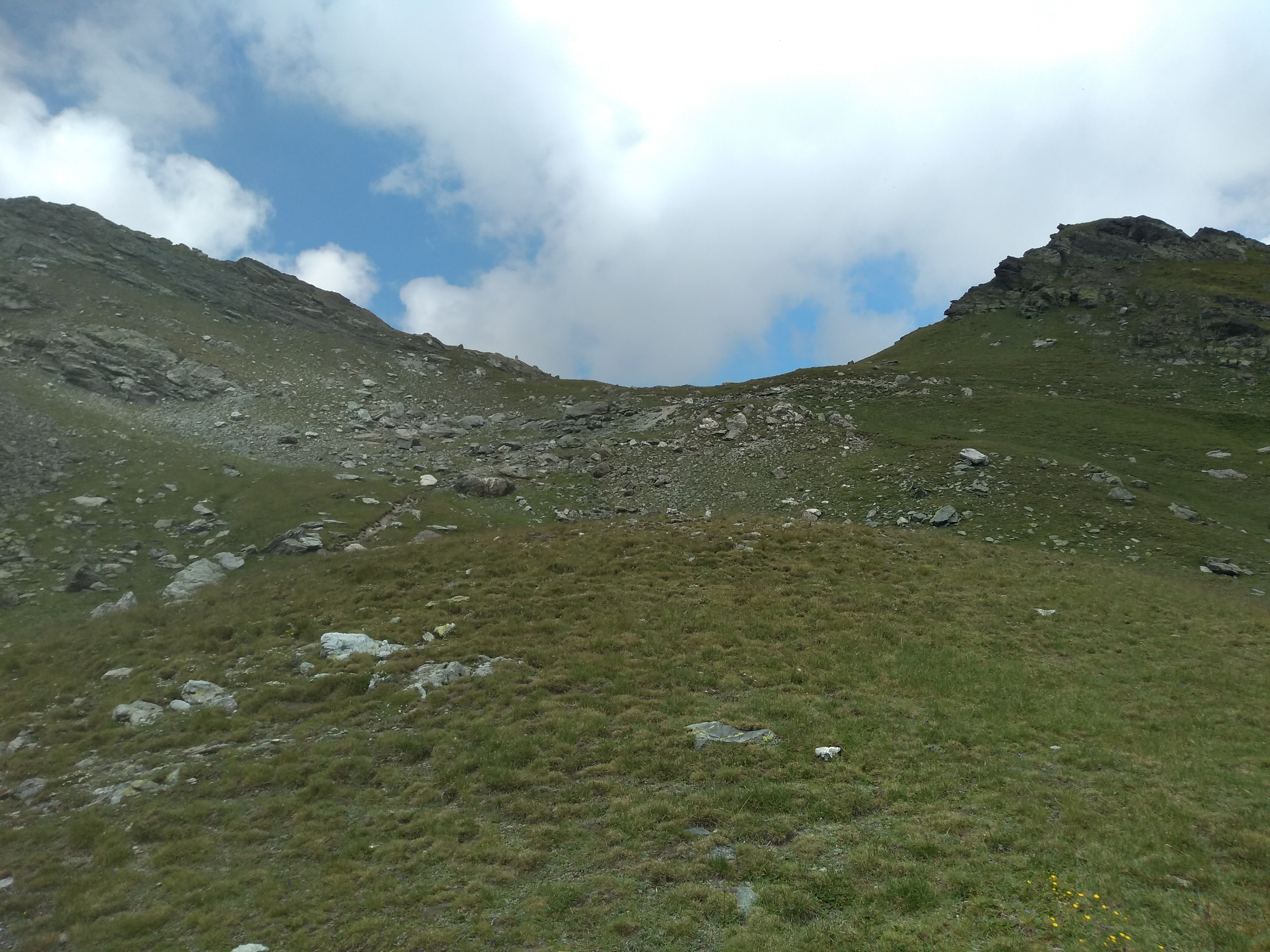
Mountain pass Little Korab Gate

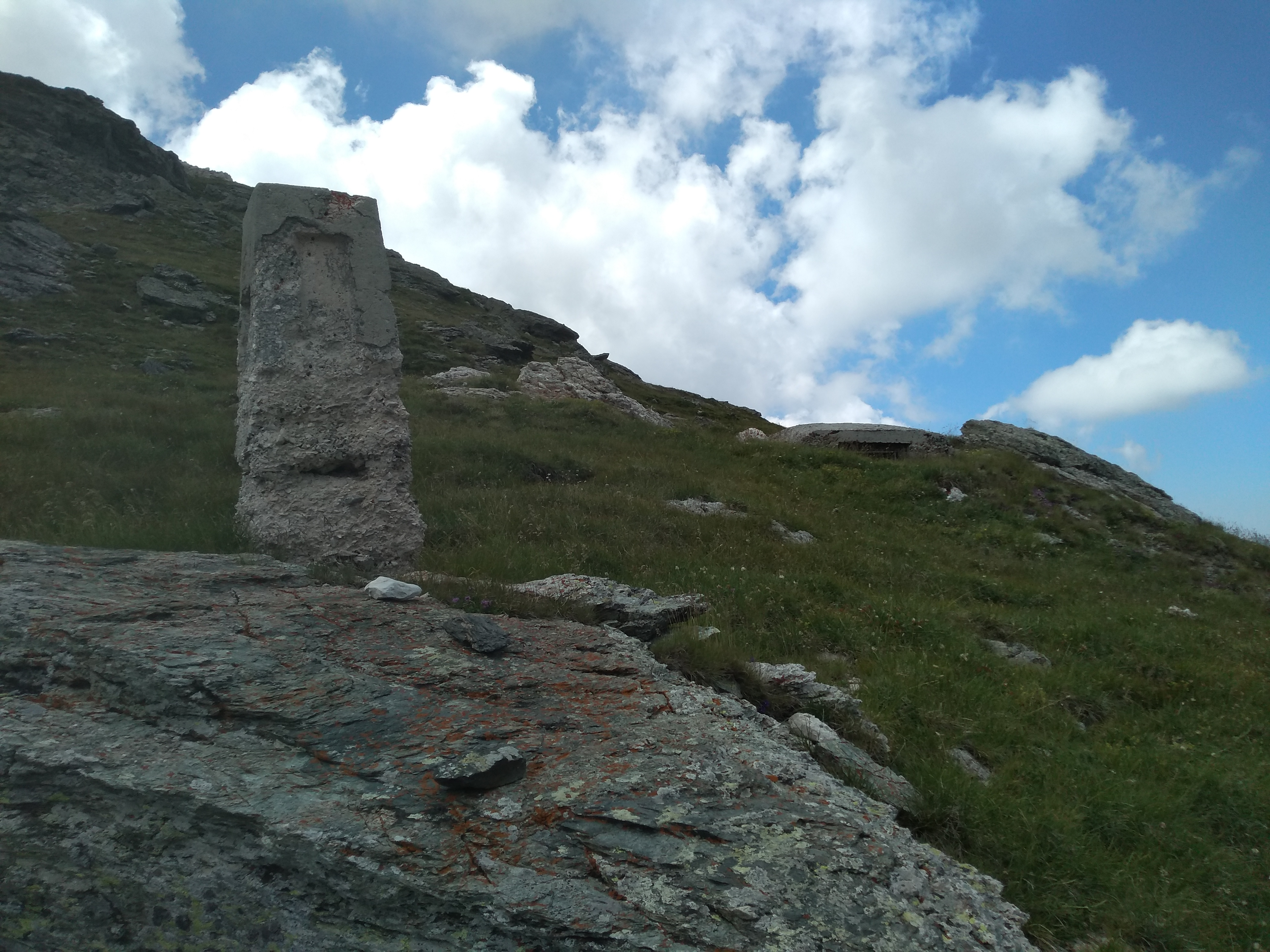
Border-stone marker with a bunker (on Albanian side) on Little Korab Gate

Little Korab Gate (Albanian: Porta e Korabit të Vogël; Macedonian: Мала Корабска Врата, romanized: Mala Korabska Vrata) is a mountain pass on the border of Albania and North Macedonia. Little Korab Gate is located southwest of the main Mount Korab summit, which is the highest mountain of both countries. Little Korab Gate is 2,465 m (8,087 ft) high. It is 403 m higher than Big Korab Gate, on the northern slope of Mount Korab.
