= Korab =

Mountain range in Albania and North Macedonia

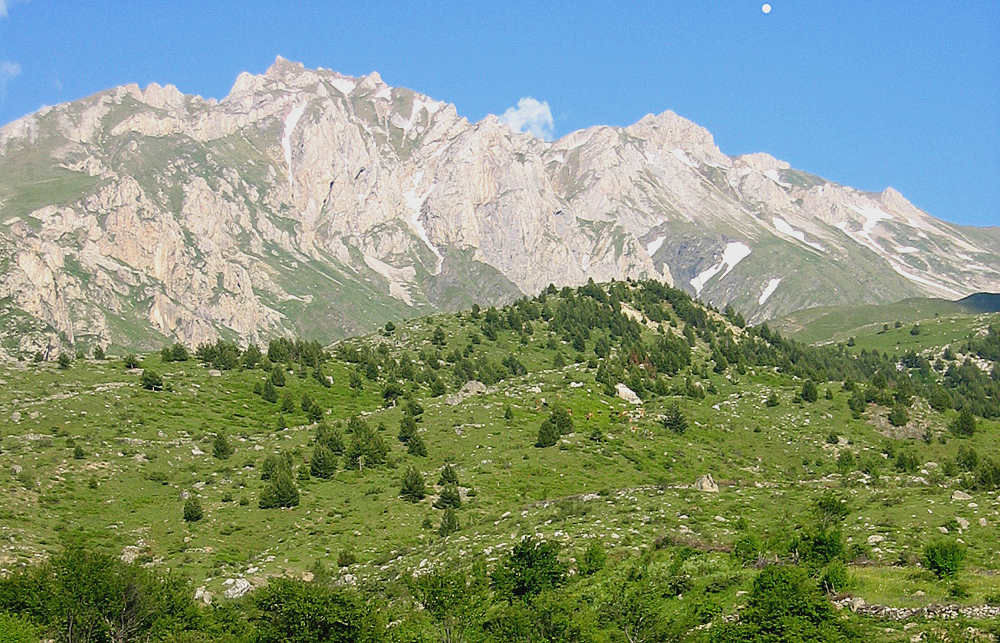
- Mount Korab

Highest point
- Peak: Mount Korab
- Elevation: 2,764 m (9,068 ft)
- Coordinates: 41°47′25″N 20°32′48″E

Geography
- Location within Balkans Location within Albania Location within North Macedonia
- Countries: Albania and North Macedonia

Geology
- Rock age: Paleozoic
- Mountain type: Range
- Rock type: Limestone

Korab (Albanian: Mali i Korabit, Macedonian: Кораб) is a mountain range in eastern Albania and western North Macedonia, running along the border between the two countries. It forms also the European Green Belt. In Albania, it is also called Vargu lindor (English: Eastern range), but this term encompasses mountains further north, such as the Koritnik and Gjallica. The highest peak is Mount Korab at 2,764 m (9,068 ft) above sea level. With a prominence of 2,169 m (7,116 ft), Korab is the 18th most prominent mountain peak in the European continent. The mountains are composed of sedimentary rock, including shale, sandstone, dolomite and limestone. The name means large boat in Macedonian.

Geographically, the Korab mountain range extends 40 km (25 mi) from the Dibër Valley in a north-south direction, between the river valleys of the Black Drin and its tributary the Radika. It is located near the tripoint of Albania, North Macedonia, and Kosovo, southwest of the Šar Mountains. The Drin Valley lies around 400 m (1,300 ft) to the west, the bed of the Radika at about 1,000 m (3,300 ft) above sea level.

The geology of the park is dominated by mountains made up of exposed faulted sedimentary rock and valleys containing glacial lakes.

The Albanian part has numerous high peaks and ranges, almost as tall as the Korab massif. To the north of this double-peak, there are many other nameless peaks of a similar height. Korab-Pforte (Albanian: Maja Portat e Korabit, Macedonian: Mala Korapska Vrata) lies around 2 km (1.2 mi) southwest of Korab massif and is almost as tall as the main mountain, at 2,727 m (8,947 ft). A few hundred meters further south, there are other peaks, Maja e Moravës 2,718 m (8,917 ft) and Mali i Gramës 2,345 m (7,694 ft). The mountains are composed of shale and limestone. Much of the range is protected by nature parks, a prominent one being the Korab-Koritnik Nature Park.

South of the complex of peaks around Mount Korab, there are other large mountains: Mali i Gramës (2,345 m (7,694 ft)) and Dešat's Velivar summit (2,375 m (7,792 ft)). After that, the range falls away to the city of Debar and the Debar Lake. The city of Peshkopi is to the southwest of Mali i Gramës and has geothermal baths.

== Image gallery ==
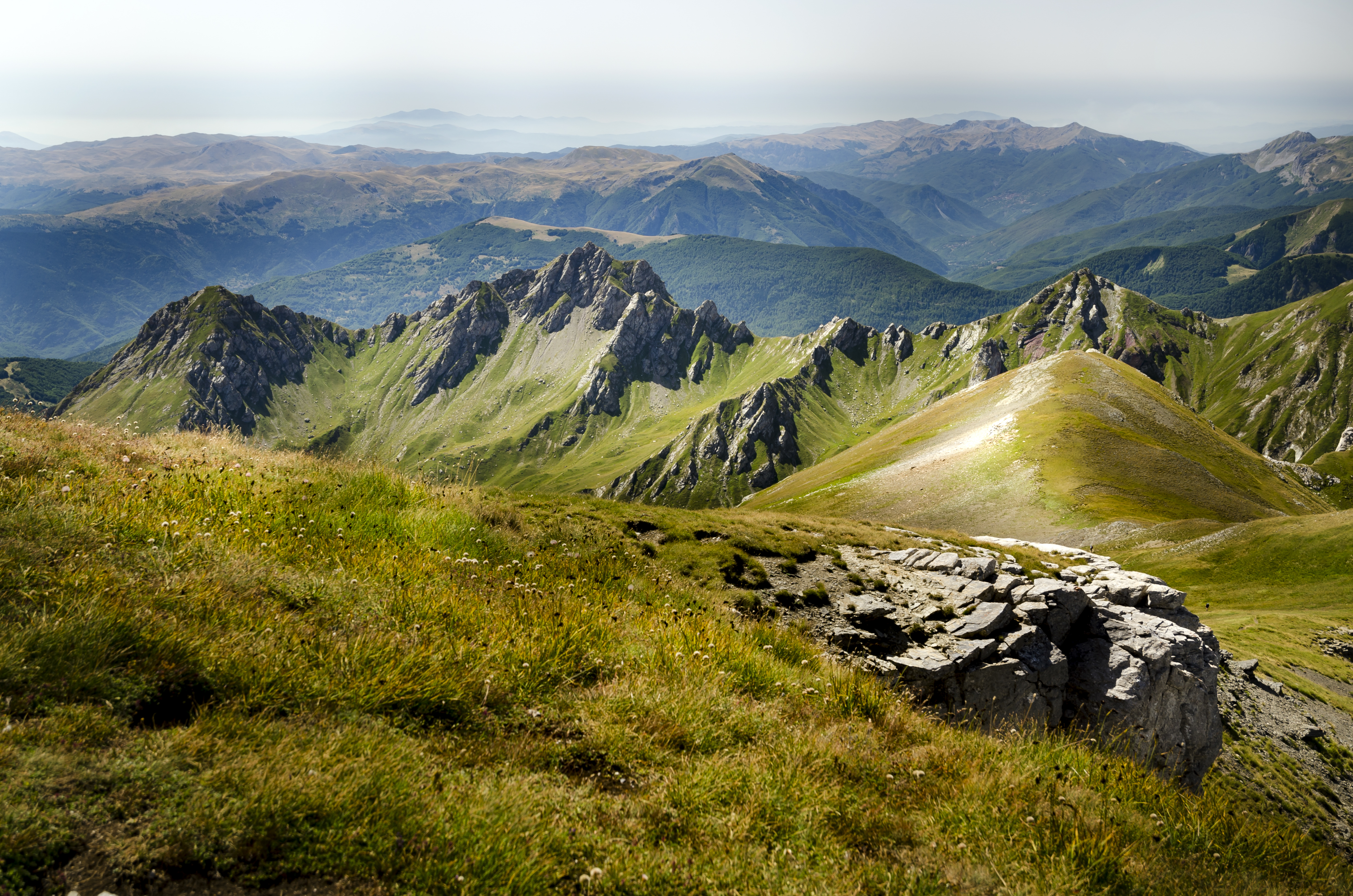
Mali Korab and Korabska Vrata captured from Mount Korab

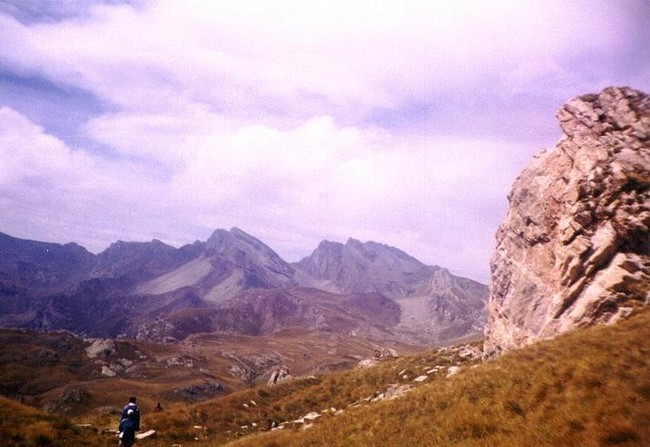
The range from the Macedonian side

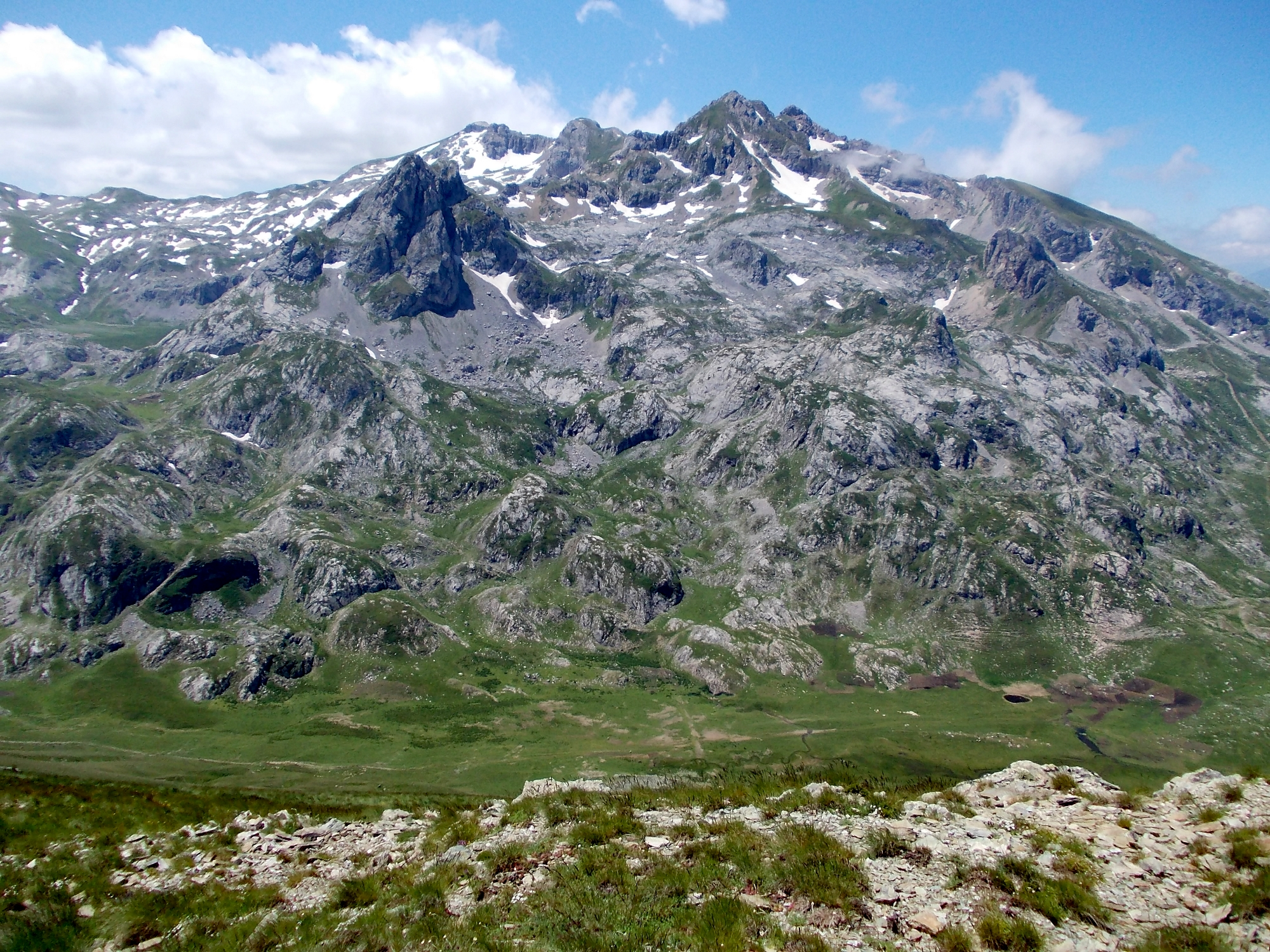
Fusha e Korabit

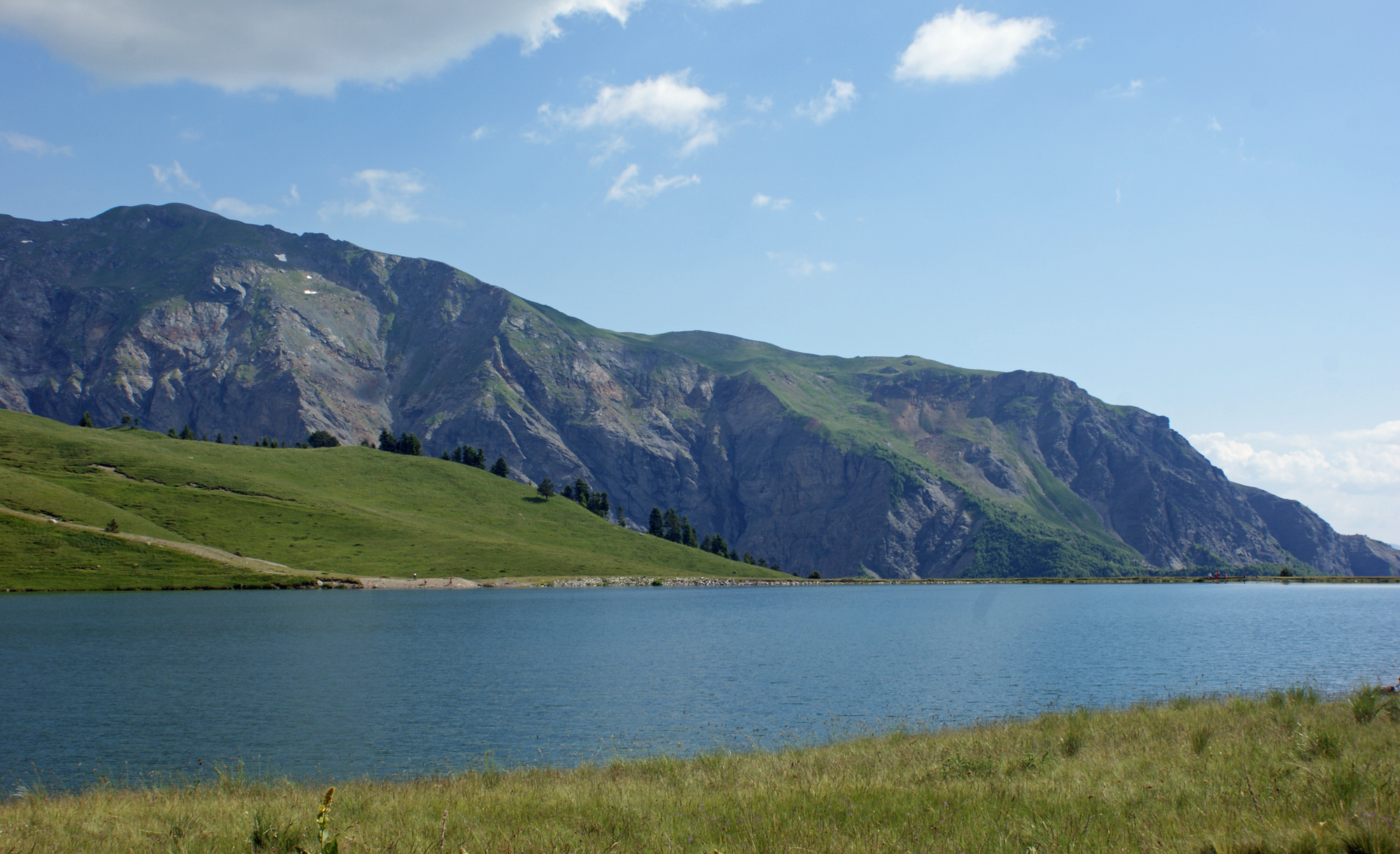
Glacial Gramë Lake

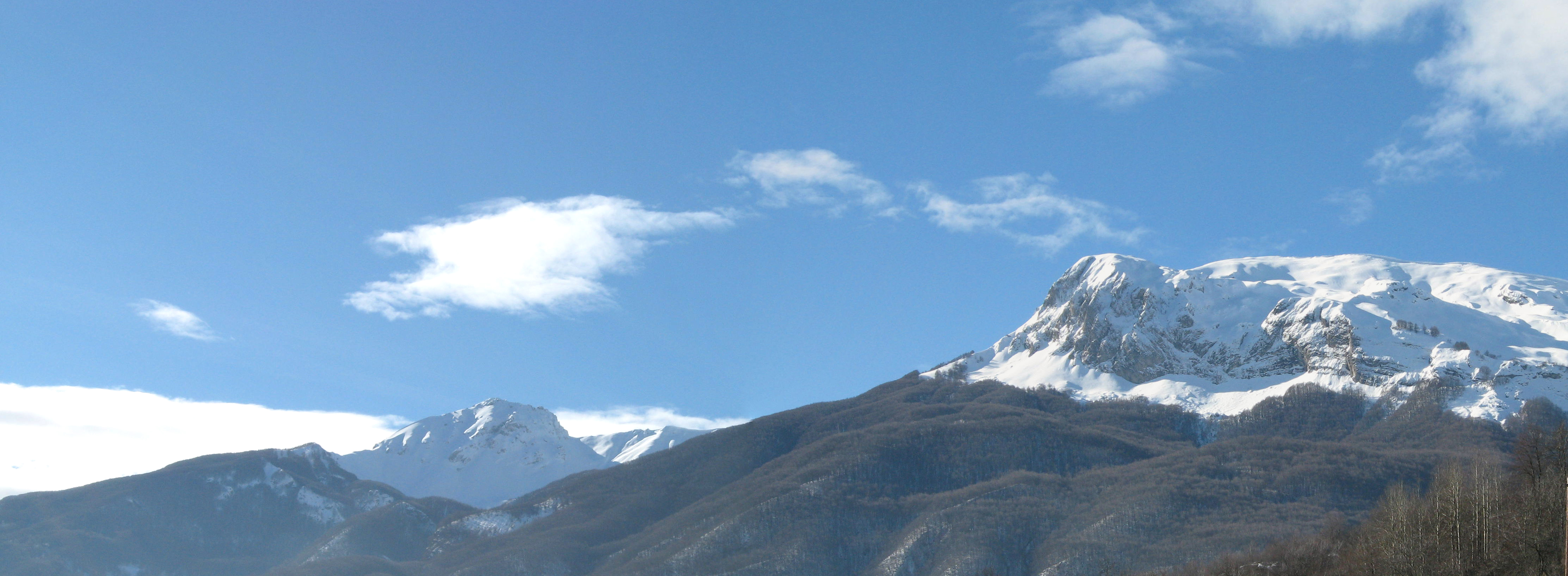
Dešat

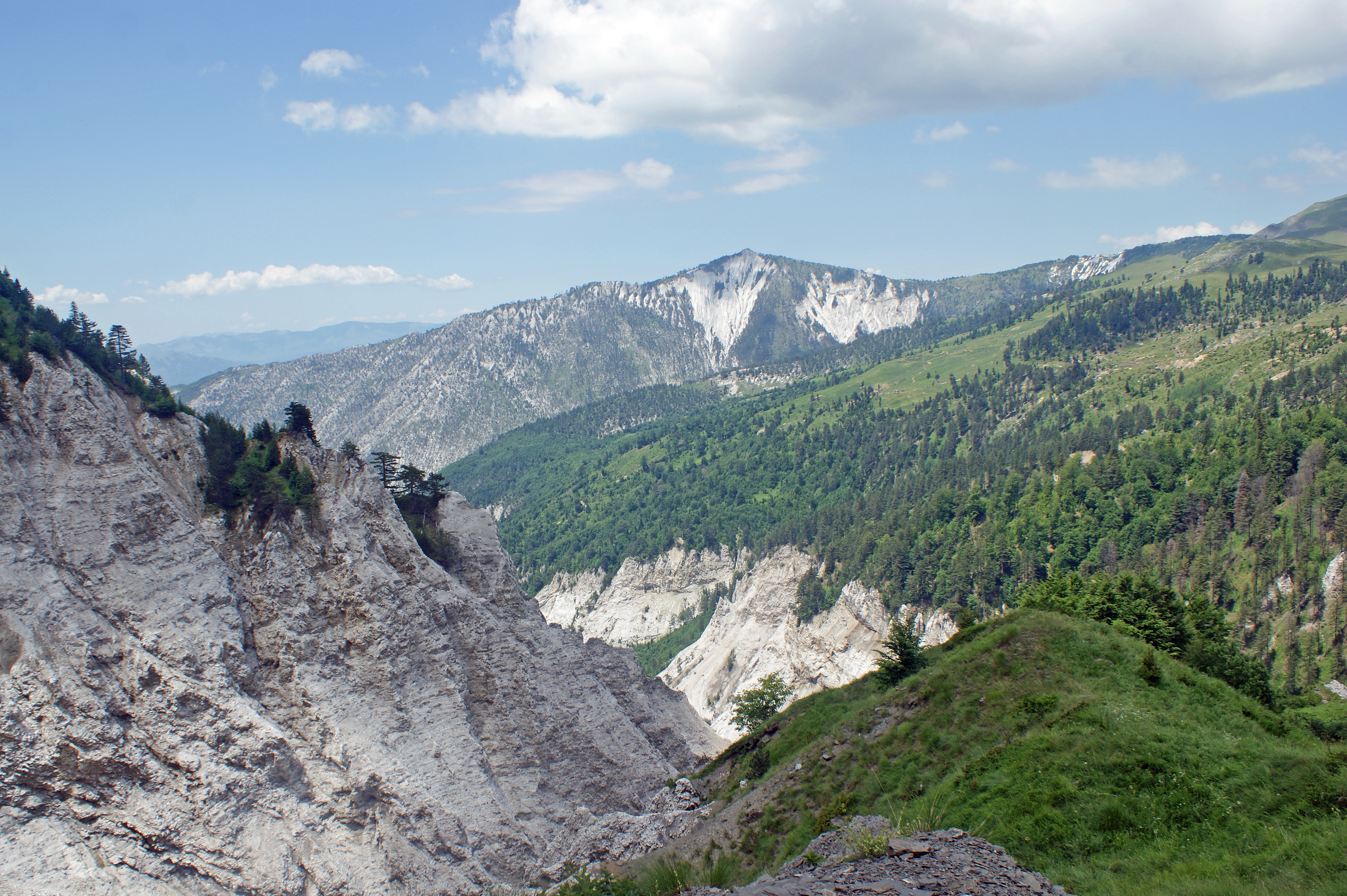
Gypsum near the Mali i Bardhë

== See also ==
- Geography of Albania
- Geography of North Macedonia

== Bibliography ==
- Poljak, Željko (February 1959). "Korab". Kazalo za "Hrvatski planinar" i "Naše planine" 1898—1958 (PDF). Naše planine (in Croatian). Vol. XI. p. 27. ISSN 0354-0650.
