= Mali i Gramës =

Mountain in Dibër County, Albania

Grama
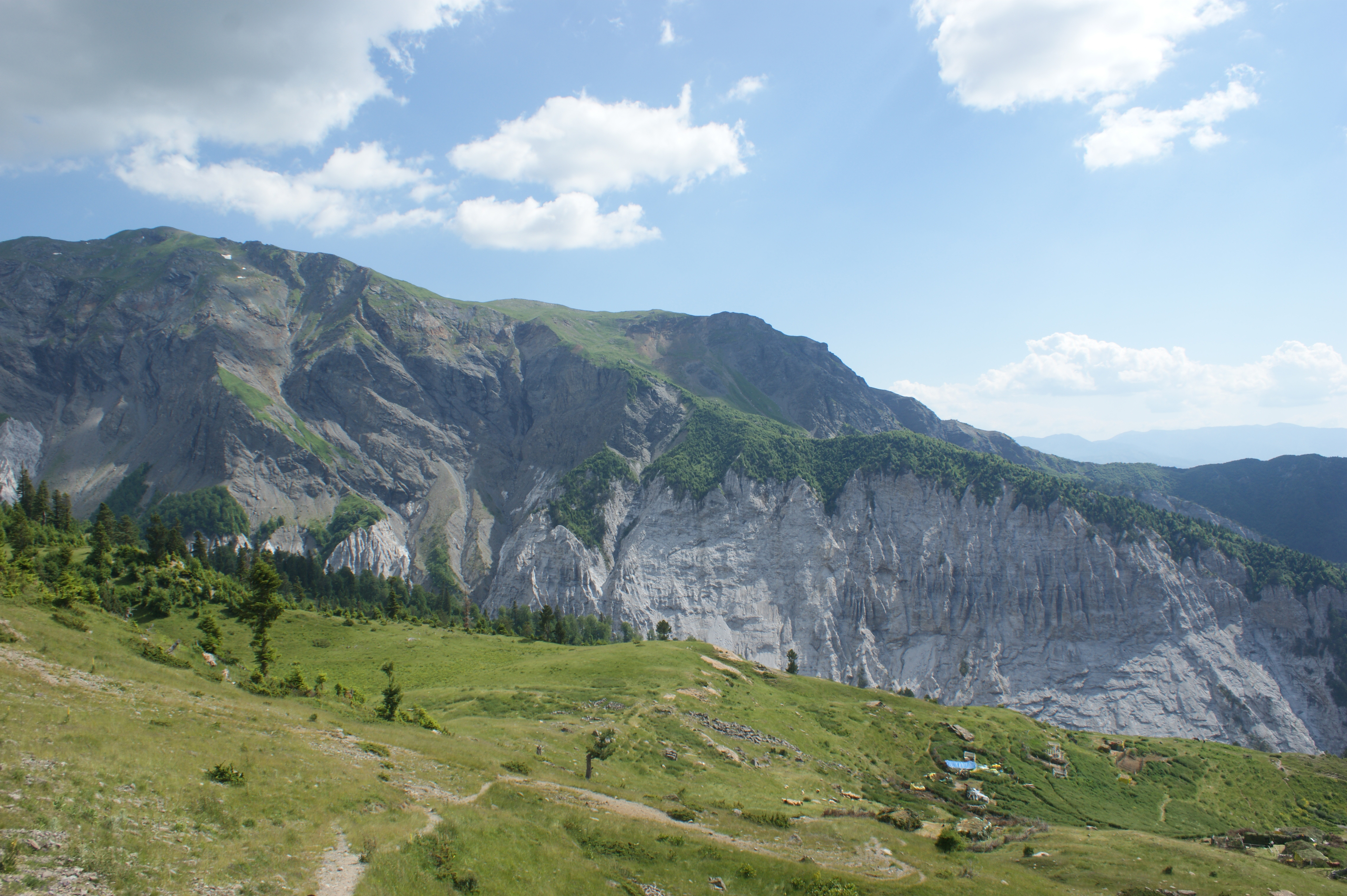
- Mali i Gramës seen from the north

Highest point
- Elevation: 2,345 m (7,694 ft)
- Listing: Ultra
- Coordinates: 41°43′52″N 20°29′36″E

Geography
- Location within Albania Location within North Macedonia
- Location: Dibër, Albania
- Parent range: Korab Mountains

Geology
- Rock age: Triassic
- Mountain type: Limestone

Grama is a mountain in the Albanian part of the Korab mountain range. It reaches a height of 2,345 metres. Around the mountain are many lakes including the largest lake on Mount Korab which also shares the name 'Gramë'. It is located around one and a half kilometres west of Mount Korab itself, to which it is connected to the main part of the mountain by a long ridge.

== Geology ==
Mali i Gramës refers to the peak itself, but also the entire southwestern spur of the Korab range, which is about eight kilometres long. In the north, the Gramë stream flows through a deep canyon to a terrace. To the east of this is Lake Gramë (c. 1750 metres above sea level).

There are several gypsum deposits in the region around Gramë. Natural monuments in the region include the Karst i Malit të Bardhë, the Selenium deposit at Pasqyrat e Gramës, and the cirque at Bjeshka e Zonjave.

On the north side of the mountain, the Malli i Gramës falls away into a sheer cliff. The main access from the villages in the southwest to the seasonal pasture northeast of the mountain runs over the summit. Cerjan on the south side and Zimur in the southwest are the highest villages on the mountain, at around 1300 metres above sea level. In the southwest, around seven kilometres away at an altitude of around 650 metres, where it is flatter, is the capital of the region, Peshkopi.

== See also ==
- Central Mountain Range
- Korab-Koritnik Nature Park
- Korab and Mount Korab
- Geography of Albania
- Mountains of Albania
