= Mount Korab =

Mountain in Albania and North Macedonia

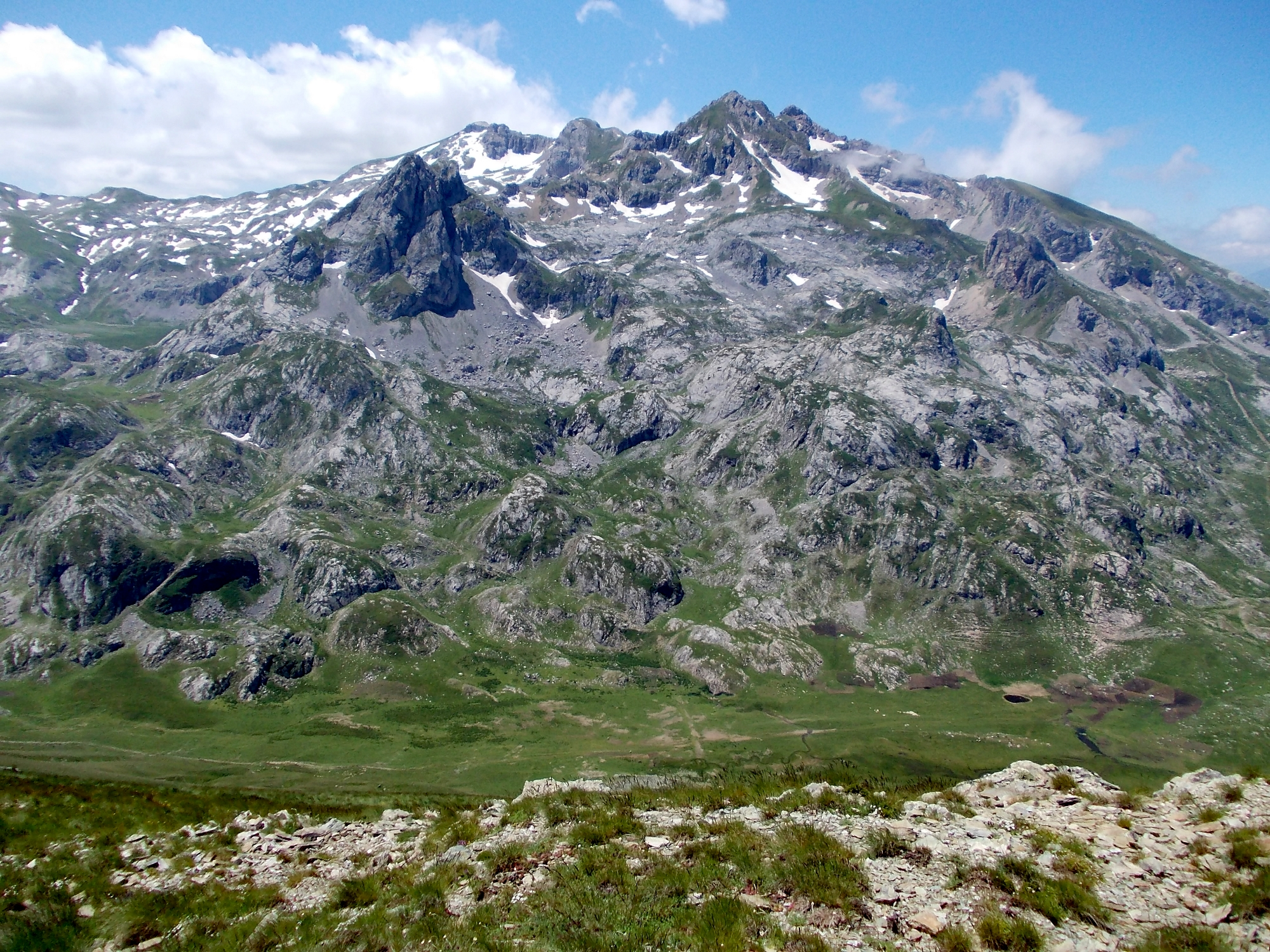

Highest point
- Elevation: 2,764 m (9,068 ft)
- Prominence: 2,169 m (7,116 ft)
- Isolation: 234.8 km (145.9 mi) to
- Listing: Ultra, Ribu Country high point
- Coordinates: 41°47′28″N 20°32′52″E

Naming
- Native name: Maja e Korabit, Mali i Korabit (Albania) (Albanian); Голем Кораб (North Macedonia) (Macedonian)

Geography
- Location within Albania
- Location: Dibër County, Albania; Mavrovo i Rostuše Municipality, North Macedonia
- Countries: Albania; North Macedonia
- Parent range: Korab

Korab (Albanian: Maja e Korabit or Mali i Korabit; Macedonian: Голем Кораб, romanized: Golem Korab, lit. 'Great Korab') is the highest peak of the eponymous mountain range and the fourth-highest mountain located entirely in the Balkan Peninsula, standing at 2,764 metres (9,068 feet).

Situated on the border between the two countries, Korab is the highest peak of both Albania and North Macedonia and is also one of only two summits in Europe to be the highest point for more than one country, the other being Mont Blanc. It is also the 18th most prominent mountain peak in Europe and the third on the Balkan Peninsula.

The Albanian part of Korab is situated within the Korab-Koritnik Nature Park. The mountain is noted for its rich flora, including species such as Bosnian pine, European beech and alder.

The peak lies next to the Šar Mountains and is part of the national emblem of North Macedonia.

The name Korab means ship in Macedonian.

== Geography ==
The Korab range stretches over 40 kilometres (25 miles) in a north–south direction between the lower section of the Black Drin and its tributary the Radika. It is around the border triangle of Albania, North Macedonia and Kosovo, southwest of the Šar Mountains.

The peak is a very rugged mountain massif consisting mainly of shale and limestone of the Paleozoic period with block structures, as well as severely damaged gypsum rocks of Permo Triassic. On the west side, the mountain falls steeply over rock walls. The north side consists of craggy rocks. A kind of double peak, that of Korab II 2,751 m (9,026 ft) is about 150 m (160 yd) northwest of the peak within Albanian territory. On the same ridge are two other peaks rising over 2,700 metres (8,900 ft): Shulani i Radomirës and Korab III. The southeast, stretching from a few rock bands broken by meadows to the summit is easily accessed, and occasionally by shepherds with their flocks of sheep.

In addition to the Korab peak, there are several other, almost equally high elevations. North of the twin peaks are numerous other nameless, almost equally high rock towers. The peak about 2 km (1 mi) to the southwest, Korab-gate (Albanian: Maja e Portës së Korabit; Macedonian: Korapska Mala vrata) reaches 2,727 m (8,947 ft). A few hundred metres south is another peak, Maja e Moravës, which is only a little lower at 2,718 m (8,917 ft).

The peaks are occasionally interrupted by radial tectonics in the shape of blocks that end in the Radika valley on North Macedonia's side. Some of these blocks have steep slopes reaching up to 500 m (1,640 ft). In its highest part, above 2,000 m (6,562 ft), the climate is alpine and includes some alpine flora elements.

The mountain is home to the spectacular Korab Falls in the upper valley of the Dlaboka River. In springtime, the waterfall reaches a height of over 130 meters, making it the highest in North Macedonia. The state border intersects the higher peak, Great Korab.

Ascent from the Macedonian side involves entering the Macedonian–Albanian boundary area, for which a special permit is required from the Ministry of Internal Affairs of North Macedonia, although people regularly trek on Korab without it.

The two main passes in the Korab ridge are the Little Korab Gate (2,465 m (8,087 ft)) and Big Korab Gate (2,062 m (6,765 ft)).

The mountain has a number of sub-peaks that are higher than 2000 metres. These include Korab II (unnamed peak) 2,756 m (9,042 ft), Korab III (unnamed peak) 2,724 m (8,937 ft), Korab Gates (peak) 2,727 m (8,947 ft), Maja e Moravës 2,718 m (8,917 ft), Shulani i Radomirës 2,716 m (8,911 ft) and Small Korab 2,683 m (8,802 ft).

== Climbing ==
There are no formal restrictions on climbing the mountain from the Albanian side. The area is now safer and more stable than it has been in recent times. It is possible to drive as far as the local village of Radomira. It is also possible to ascend from the North Macedonia side, starting at the Strezimir border outpost. When approaching from North Macedonia, hikers will be required to report to the border checkpoint and present their passport.

== See also ==
- Geography of Albania
- Geography of North Macedonia
- Korab-Koritnik Nature Park
- List of non-Alpine European Ultras
- Protected areas of Albania
