= Gjallica =

Mountain on the border between Albania and North Macedonia

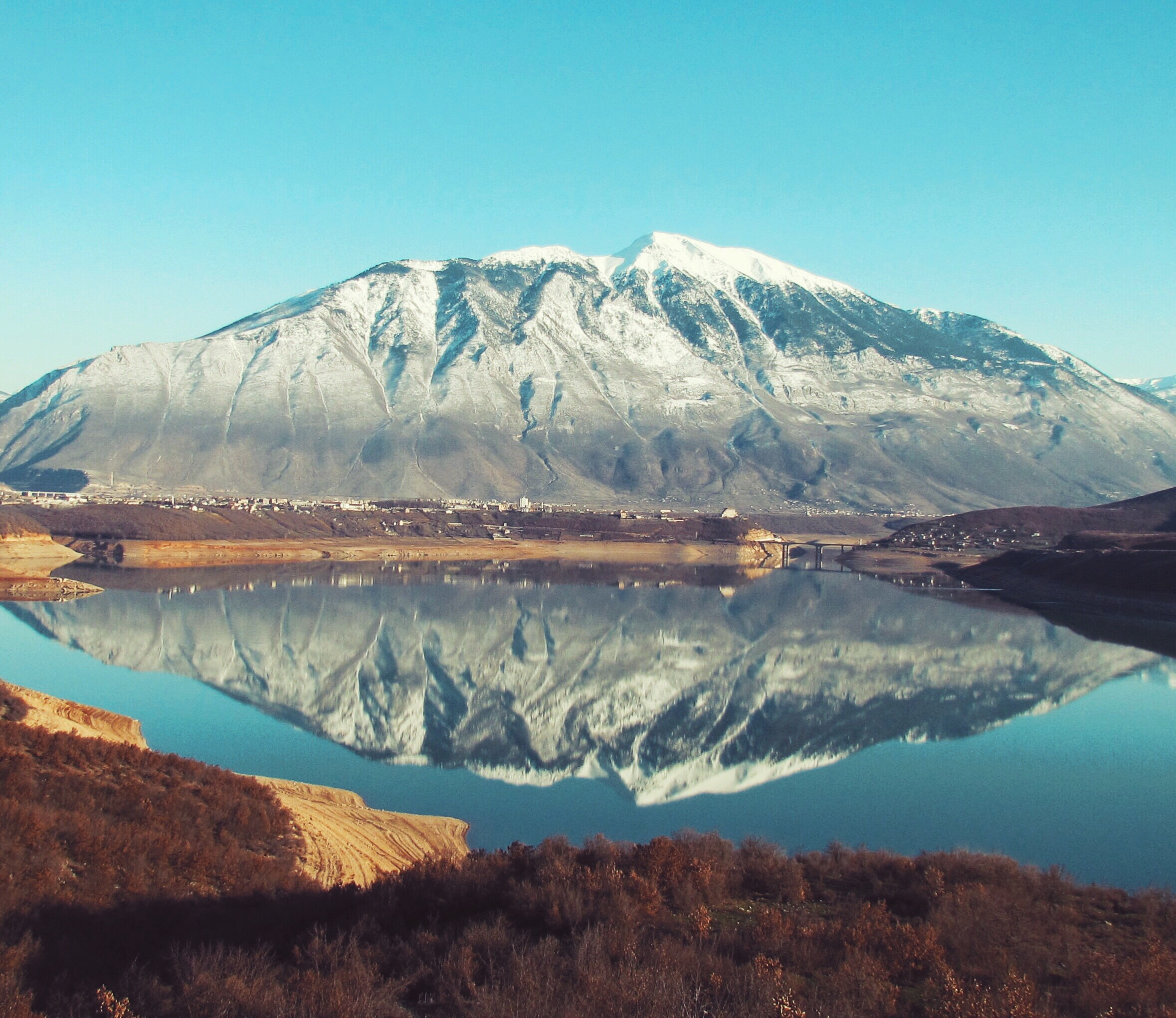
- View of Gjallica

Highest point
- Elevation: 2,486 m (8,156 ft)
- Prominence: 744 m (2,441 ft)
- Isolation: 24 km (15 mi)
- Coordinates: 42°01′01″N 20°28′20″E

Geography
- Location within Albania
- Country: Albania
- Region: Central Mountain Region
- Municipality: Kukës
- Parent range: Korab

Geology
- Rock age: Triassic
- Mountain type: massif
- Rock type: limestone

Gjallica, also known as Gjallica e Lumës, is a massif in northeastern Albania, located within the municipal boundaries of Kukës. Reaching an elevation of 2,486 m (8,156 ft) above sea level, it constitutes one of the highest and most prominent peaks of the Korab mountain range.

== Geography ==
Gjallica lies at the northeastern edge of the Korab range, between the Kukës basin to the northwest and the Shishtavec plateau to the southeast. To the northeast, the Vanave Gorge separates it from Mount Koritnik.

The mountain features a striking pyramidal shape, rising prominently above the Lumë plateau. Its summit ridge forms a sharp crest that descends steeply toward the Vanave Gorge and Bicaj Canyon area, including the spring known as Kroi Tanzot.

== Geology ==
Geologically, the massif is composed primarily of Triassic limestone and has a pronounced northwest–southeast alignment, characterized by steep descending slopes. The resistant limestone bedrock has produced a rugged landscape marked by notable escarpments and abrupt relief breaks.

== Biodiversity ==
Vegetation on the mountain is generally sparse. The western slopes support scattered stands of fir and pine, including Balkan pine (Pinus peuce), while the eastern slopes are largely covered by alpine grasslands, traditionally used for grazing.

== Climbing route ==
Gjallica can be reached via several ascent routes. The most direct approach begins near the village of Shtiqën and entails an elevation gain of approximately 2,250 meters over a distance of about 25 kilometers round-trip, typically requiring more than fourteen hours to complete under favorable conditions.

A shorter and more frequently used route starts from the village of Brekije, with an average round-trip hike of around seven hours.

== See also ==
- List of mountains in Albania
