= Liqenat =

Liqenat may refer to:

- Leqinat, mountain in western Kosovo and eastern Montenegro.
- Leqinat lake, a mountain lake in the Liqenat mountain, in western Kosovo.
- Small Lićenat Lake, a small lake in the Liqenat mountain, in western Kosovo.
