= Rugova (region) =

Mountain region in Kosovo

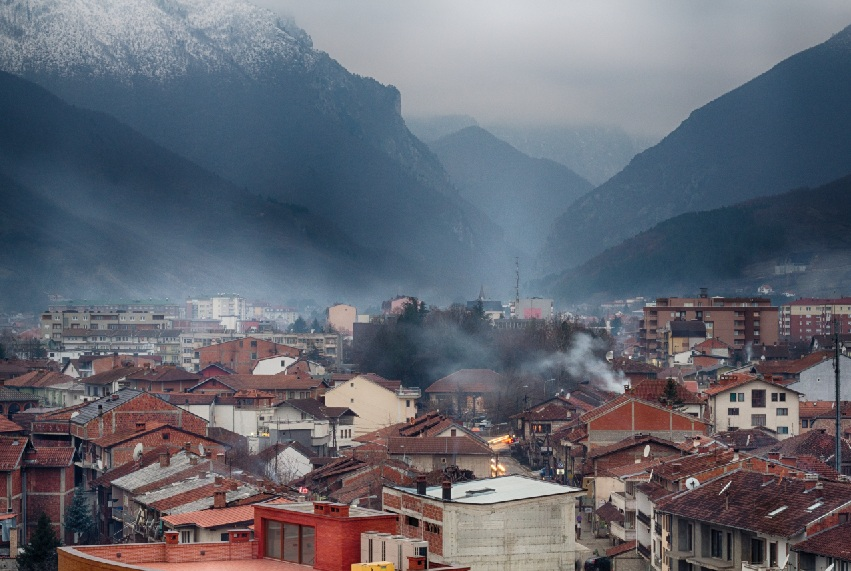
The view of Rugova Mountains from Peja

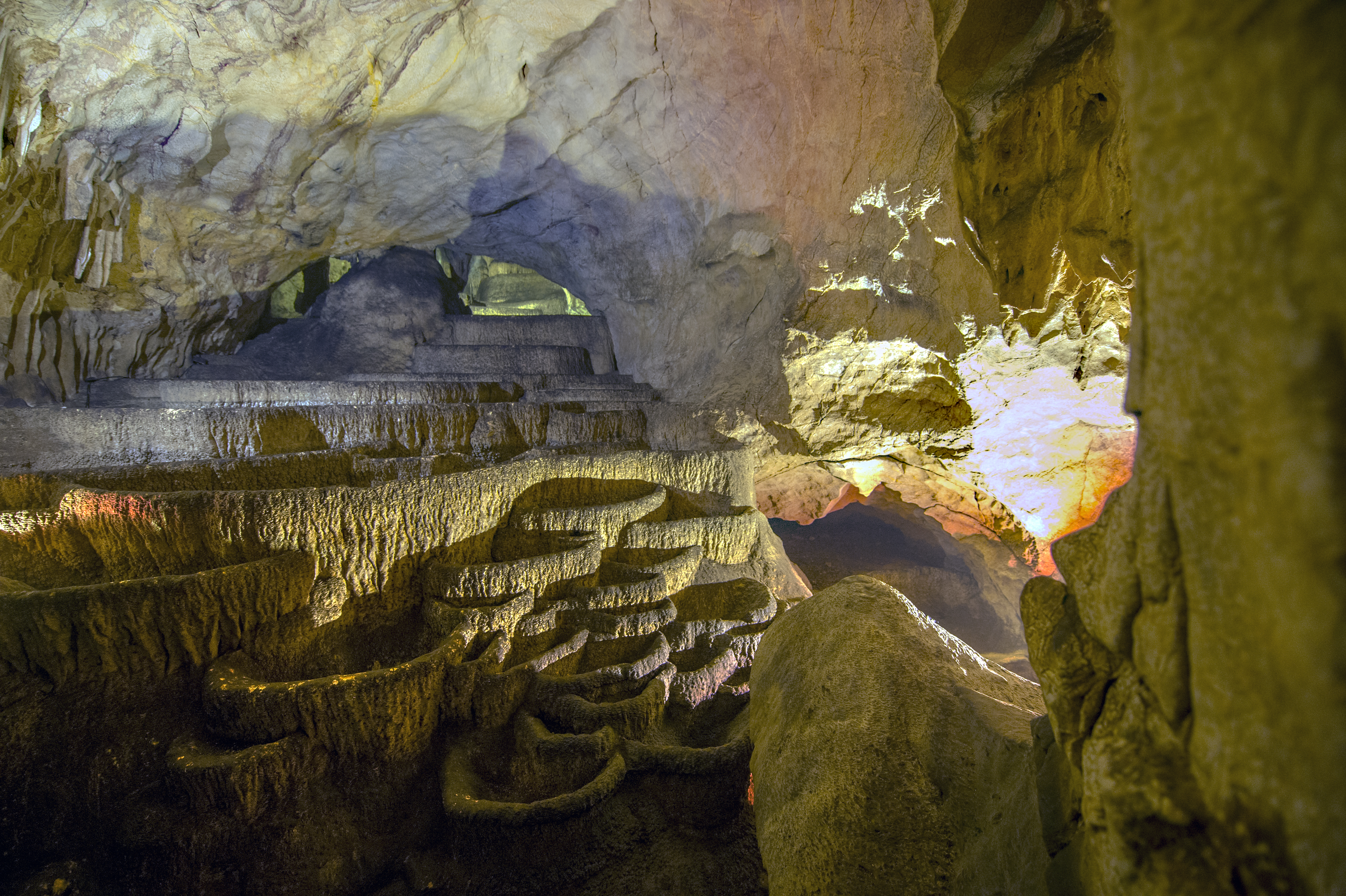
Bukuroshja e Fjetur Cave

Rugova (Albanian: Rugova or Rugovë) is a mountain region located to the north-west of the city of Peja, in Kosovo. In 2013, it was designated a national park by the Parliament of Kosovo.

Rugova is an ethnographically diverse region, with great importance for the literary branches of lexicology, etymology and onomastics. Rugova is a suitable region for hiking, skiing, mountaineering, paragliding, and picnics.

It was ranked as the fourth most important center for winter sports by the International Ski Federation (ISF). Furthermore, in April 2013, Peja won the "Tourism for Tomorrow" award for the project, "Peaks of the Balkans".

Rugova is rich with many landform elements such as caves, waterfalls, glacial lakes, high peaks, and tunnels. The highest peak is Hajla at 2,403 m (7,884 ft). From Qafa e Qyqes (Cuchoo's Neck) it is possible to observe the whole city of Peja. Guri i Kuq, 1,522 m (4,993 ft), has views of Gjeravica, Trekufiri, Maja e Mariashit (Mariashi Peak), Maja e Hekurave (Iron Peak), Shkëlzeni and Lake Plav. Maja e Vjelakut is also a high peak at 2,014 m (6,608 ft).

A via ferrata (iron path) starts 4 km (2.5 mi) from Peja, and is the only one in the Balkans.

Rugova offers good living conditions even though the number of residents has dramatically decreased.

== Etymology ==
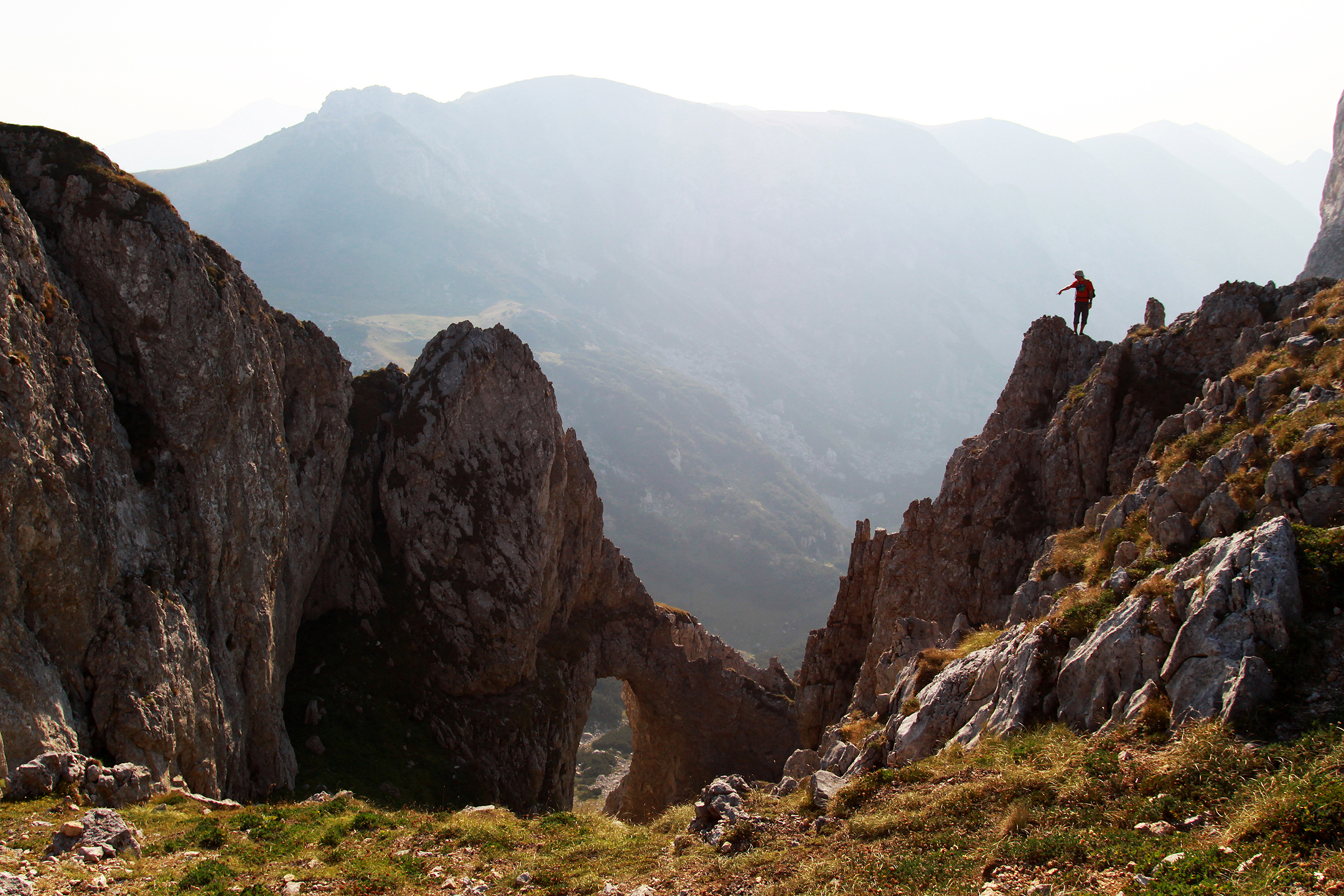
Lugu i Shkodres

The term "Rugovë" derives from the word "rrugë" which means "street", as a lot of very important roads have crossed this region. The only route that connected Albania with Montenegro went through Rugova. The oldest name "Shtupel" dates back to 1292, and it represented two of Rugova's villages: Shtupeqi i madh and Shtupeqi i vogël. The meaning of this nomenclature comes from the word "stëp" which means an individual involved in the making of dairy products such as milk, cheese, and yogurt.)

All the village names in Rugova are rooted in the Albanian language. For example, the village of Dugave (now part of Zagreb) is derived from the word duka ("duke", Latin: dux); Kuqishtë is named after the red rocks and stones that can be found in this area; Reka e Allagës is derived from a noble in the region of Rožaje, and Stankaj from Stank Nika, who was very famous. The incursions of Slavic, and later, Ottoman, conquerors has meant many places have changed names over the centuries, as the power of various empires grew and waned.

Place names are based on features such as:

- Natural: Gropa e Borës, Kërshi i Madh, Qafa e Deshve, Neqinati
- Ethnographic: Guri i Nuses, Qafa e Dasmorëve, Livadhi i Gjakut, Sheu i Qyqes
- Historical: Kodra e Trimave, Vorret e Shehitëve, Hajla e Keqe
- Native: Bjeshkët e Kelmendit, Bregu i Kishës, Kroi i Nikçve, Maja e Nikë Dedës, Lugu i Shkodrës, Qafa e Rexhajve
- Masterly: Maja e Lopëve, Guri i Çobanit, Llazet e Kuajve, Kërshi i Cjapit, Shpella e Martinit

Rugova is enriched with new toponyms every now and then, for example, Kodra e Shkollës and Lëndina e Shkollës.

== History ==
=== Early history ===
The Balkans have been inhabited since prehistoric times. There are signs that Rugova has been populated since the early stone age. This was proven by the discovery of a man's femur, found in the Bukuroshja e Fjetur Cave, and by a petroglyph. Because this region has not been studied extensively, its earliest history is known mostly through local traditions.

=== Medieval and Ottoman Period ===
The earliest official documents about Rugova are from the 13th century but this area was heavily populated only two centuries later. After the invasion of the Balkans by the Ottoman Empire (1389), Rugova was part of the Sanjak of Scutari. From the 16th century, it was part of the Sanjak of Dukagjin. Rugova became a part of the Kosovo Vilayet after the new administrative division in the 19th century.

The region had a kind of autonomy from the Ottoman Empire. They were exempted from the obligations of the Ottoman government, but time after time there were conflicts between the natives and the invaders. In 1638, the Ottoman Empire in Rugova sent an army of 15,000 soldiers to invade this region. However, their attempt was unsuccessful and the Ottomans were forced to turn back. Eleven years after that, in 1649, highlanders attacked the Meduni's castle. Three days after the attack they occupied it and won more autonomy. The fighting restarted in 1700, when the High Porte charged the Pasha of Peja to vanquish Rugova, resulting in 274 families being displaced from Rugova to Peshter, Novi Pazar.

The Rugovians opposed the Ottoman Empire by participating in the Austro-Turkish War in 1737–1739. However, their greatest contribution was given for the National Movement.

=== The Albanian National Movement ===
Rugovians were always ready to fight for freedom. They participated in the Assembly of the League of Prizren in 1878 (representatives: Sali Jaha, Çelë Shabani), and were crucial to the Battle of Noksic, which was the first victory of the League. They also participated in the League of Peja in 1899 (11 representatives), and the Assembly of "Verrat e Llukes" in 1903 (two representatives). Rugovians had a key role in an armed uprising in 1904, which included Peja and Gjakova. Following the rejection of the Young Turk revolution in 1908, Rugovians found themselves facing the Ottoman army which was equipped with 24 cannons.

Rugova was also involved in the First Balkan War. On 28 November 1912, Rugova sent 60 villagers in support of Albanian Independence. After the London Conference of Ambassadors in 1913, Kosovo was separated from Albania.

In the Second Balkan War, 1913–1914, the region changed from Albanian (late Ottoman) to Serbian authority. From 1915 to 1918, Rugova was occupied by Austro-Hungary until the Serbian government was reinstated in 1918. In 1919, an armed uprising broke out in Rugova. The natives fought against the 3rd Serbian Army. The most prominent leaders were Zhuj Selmani, Sali Rama, Ker Sadria, and Zhuk Haxhia. During these years, 410 Rugovian houses were burned, and citizens joined the Kaçak movement

=== World War II ===
Rugova was under the control of Italy during World War II. During this time the first municipality was formed, headed by Zhuj Ker Bardhi, and the first Albanian school was opened. In 1942, because of the betrayal by Montenegrins, the border was closed. Four defensive groups were formed, composed half of civilian and half of military members.

1. The band of Zhuk Haxhia
2. The band of Sali Rama
3. The band of Rizë Zymeri
4. The band of Sak Fazlia

Among the fighters were women who defended their honour with weapons, for example, Bekë Maliqa (Bekë Alia) who killed 7 soldiers.

The National Liberation Movement in Rugova had a short life because the natives had lost their faith. In November 1944, Rugova and Peja were liberated.

=== Rugova after World War II ===
With the formation of Yugoslavia, Kosovo was part of the Socialist Autonomous Province of Serbia. As in any other period, there were conflicts between the Rugovians and the ruling regime. The clashes with the communists began in 1945. In Rugova, the Albanian Anti-Communist National-Democratic party was formed by the mayor, Sylë Mehmeti, who died in prison in Yugoslavia. This was the first political party in Kosovo and operated until 1952. During the Yugoslavian period, many Rugovians were active in the organization of protests and demonstrations in Kosovo. Rugova became the center of movements to stop the fighting, first in 1970, and then in 1990, when a Reconciliation Committee was founded by Anton Çetta. Rugovians rejected Serbian authority in the areas of schools, electrification, and other institutions, so there were many political prisoners.

In the 1990s, the Democratic League of Kosovo (LDK), the Association of Intellectuals, Humanitarian Association for the Return of Displaced Albanians were formed.

=== Kosovo War ===
In earlier wars, Rugova had been a shelter for patriots such as Hasan Prishtina and Haxhi Zeka. Similarly, during the Kosovo War, Rugova played a major role in sheltering those who were left homeless, and were seeking for a way to get into Montenegro and Albania. Rugova also had a branch of the Kosovo Liberation Army (KLA), commanded by Salih Lajçi, known as "The 136 Rugova Brigade".

During the war there were continuous attacks and confrontations, burning of houses, and killings. Some families, were able to keep their lands, and helped the KLA by supplying food, medicines, and other necessities. Many locals helped by supplying weapons.

The Rugovian lawyer, Bajram Kelmendi, was the first to press charges in the Hague against Slobodan Milošević. Rugova suffered major damage in the war and lost its most notable citizens.

== Geography ==
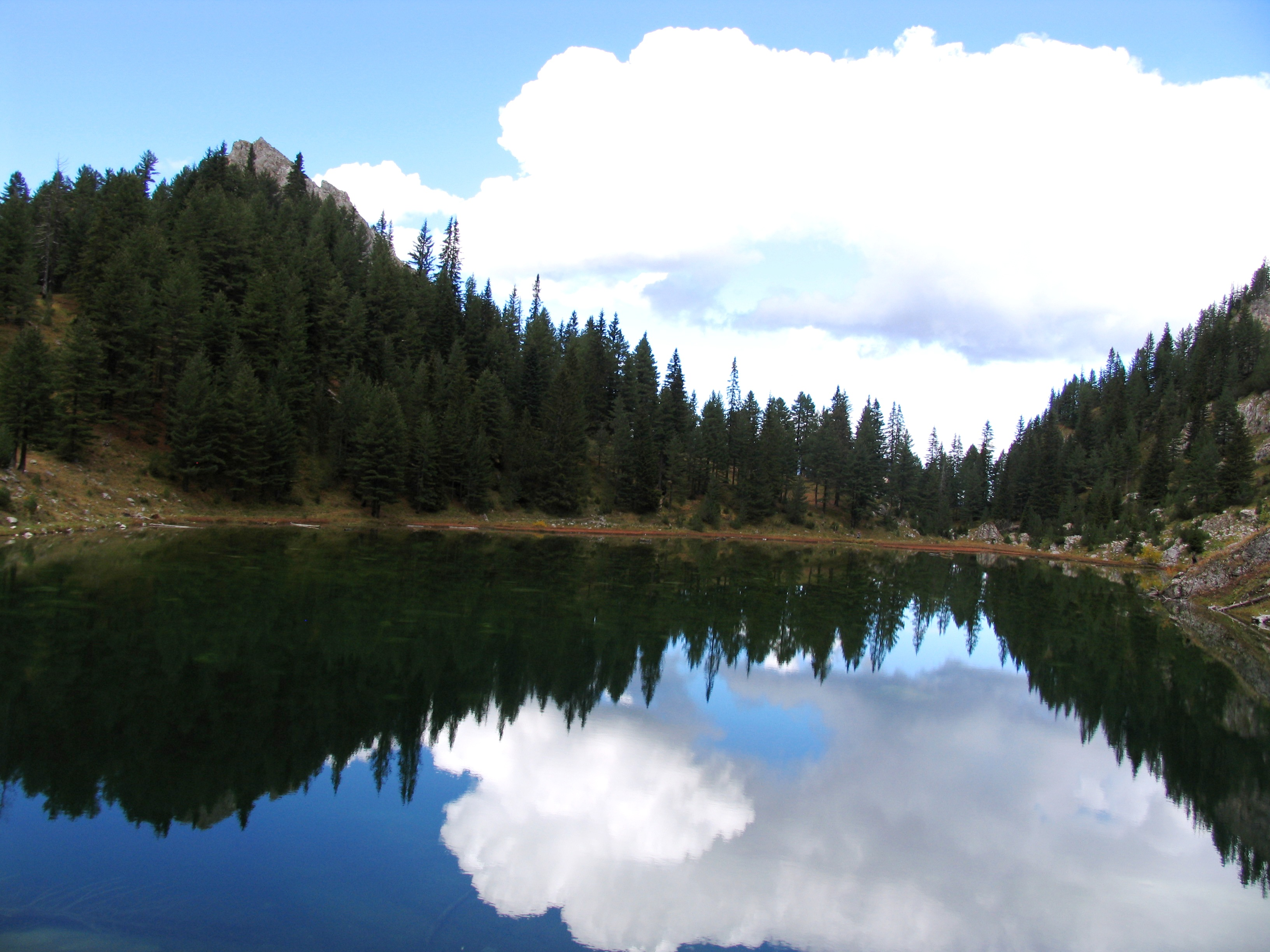
Rugova Lake

Rugova is at a latitude of 42°44’ N and a longitude of 20°3’ E, and it is 93 km (58 mi) from Pristina, the capital of Kosovo. It covers a territory of 20,330 hectares, and from east to west it extends for 23 km (14 mi). Rugova lies between the mountains of Hajla, Shtëdim, Lumbardh and Kopranik. The Peja's Lumbardh splits the mountains in half, forming a valley and a canyon (Rugova Gorge).

Eighty-five percent of the territory is covered by forests, while fifteen percent is alpine pasture. The terrain is rugged, with steep limestone slopes and deep, narrow, erosive gorges. The mountains have a slope of 15–30°, but occasionally reach 45–90°. The terrain contains various karstic features such as caves, natural tunnels, waterfalls, and glacial lakes.

The region of Rugova is divided into 13 villages (Shtupeqi i Vogël, Shtupeqi i Madh, Reka e Allagës, Drelaj, Pepaj, Malaj, Kuqishtë, Dugaivë, Haxhaj, Stankaj, Bogë, Shkrel dhe Koshutan) and five small neighbourhoods (Llaz, Bellopaq, Pecaj, Ujëmirë, Dreshaj). These villages are 2–5 kilometres (1.2–3.1 mi) apart.

Many important roads pass through Rugova: Shkodra's valley connects Rugova with Tropojë and Shkodër, Qafa e Çakorrit leads to Plav and Gusinje, Qafa e Dasmorëve connects to Rožaje, and Qafa e Hajlës with Dacaj and Husaj.

=== Climate ===
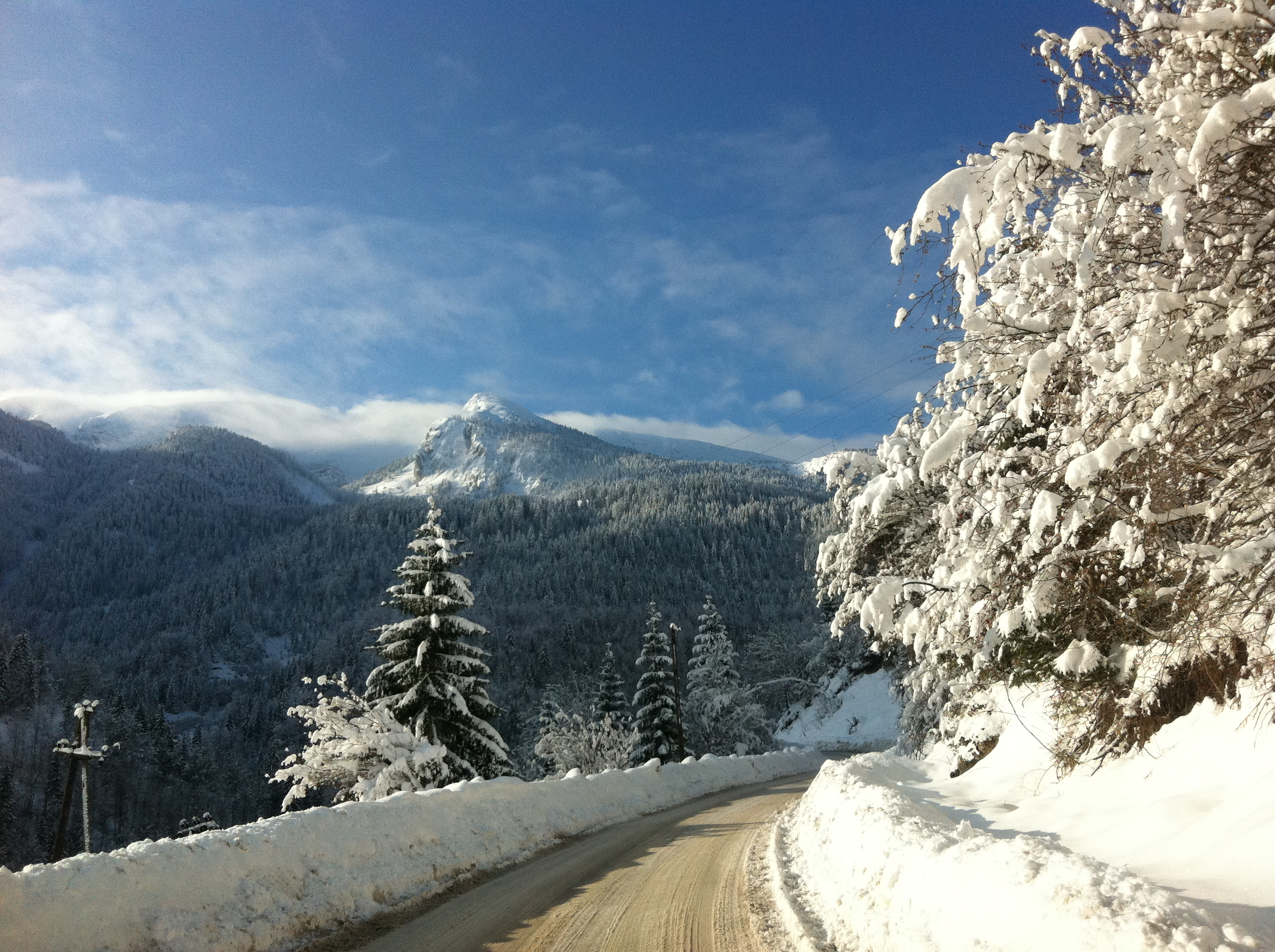
Winter in Rugova

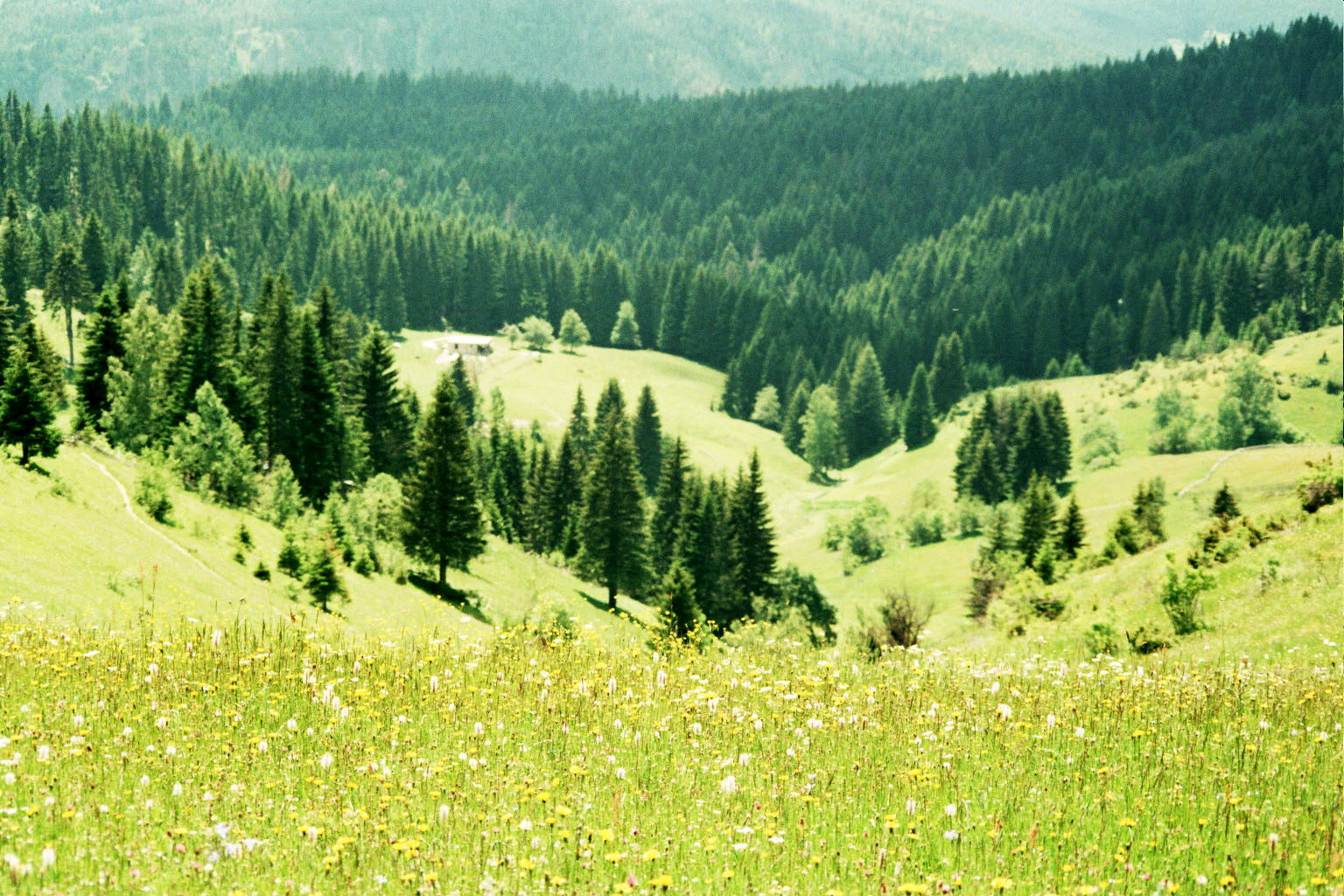
Spring in Rugova

Rugova has a wet, continental climate that is influenced by the mountains, short and hot summers, and long and harsh winters. Spring is late, and the seasons change quickly. The high level of precipitation is a result of clashes between the tropical and continental climates. Maximum precipitation is in December, 372.6 millimetres (14.67 in), and minimum in July, 0.3 millimetres (0.012 in). The annual minimum and maximum are 540.6 millimetres (21.28 in) and 1,336 millimetres (52.6 in), respectively.

Snow is present on the peaks until August, with a depth ranging from 30 centimetres (12 in) to 2 metres (6.6 ft).

The average temperatures in the region are: 4.4 °C (39.9 °F) to 7.5 °C (45.5 °F) in the spring; 10.6 °C (51.1 °F) to 17.2 °C (63.0 °F) in the summer; 5.2 °C (41.4 °F) in the fall; and −10 °C (14 °F) to −15 °C (5 °F) in the winter.

=== Hydrography ===
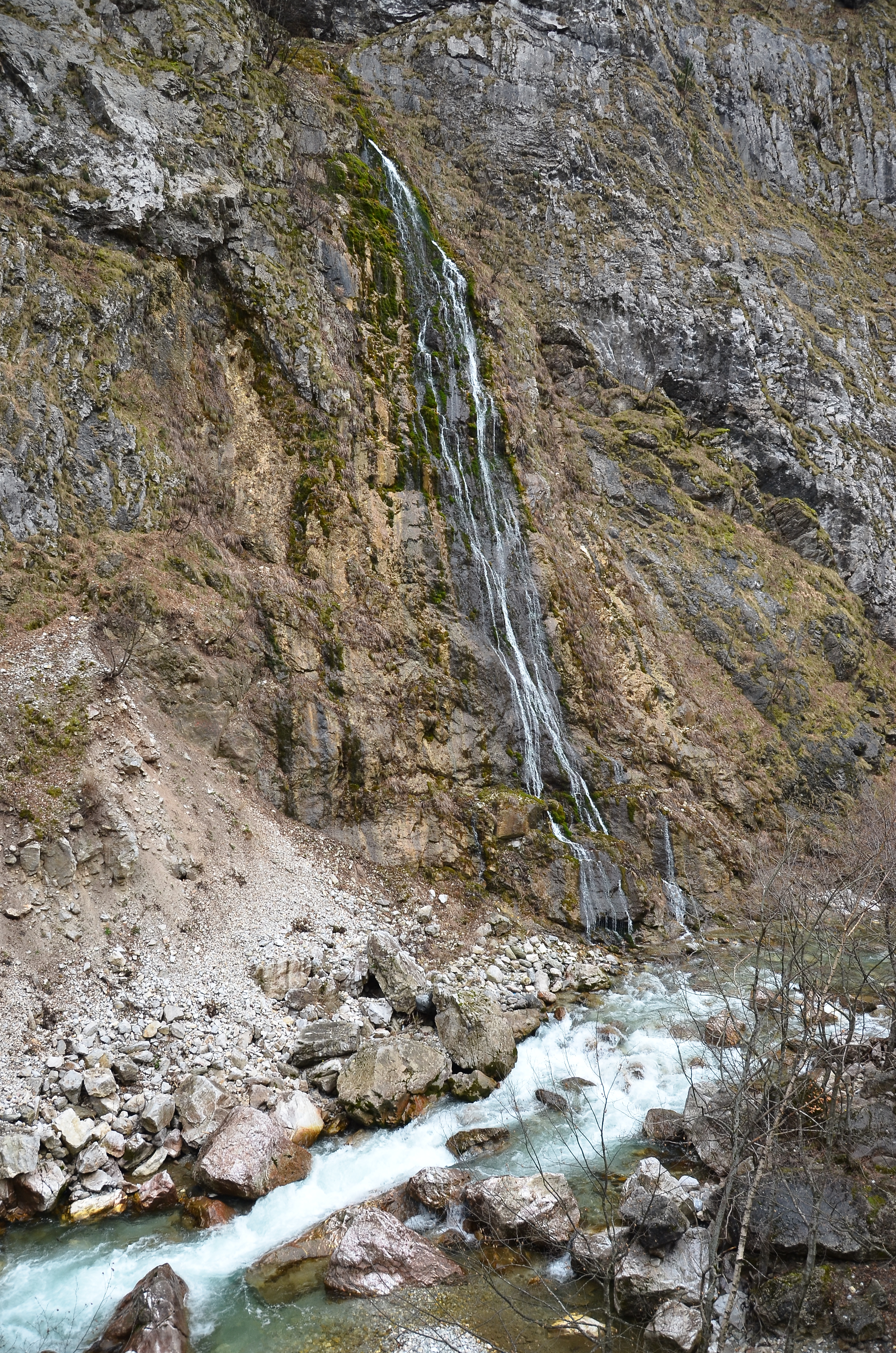
A waterfall In Rugova

Rugova consists of a very dense water network. Although limestone does not favor the presence of groundwater, it can contain large amounts of water underground.

In the southern part of the area is the glacial Kuqishta Lake (1,900 m (6,200 ft)), which is filled with fresh water during all seasons, and Drelaj Lake (1,800 m (5,900 ft)), which dries up during the hot summer. Some lakes are also found in the northern part of the area, but all of them are unstable.

Water sources in Haxhaj, and at the foot of Jelenku peak, gather in Kuqishtë and create the Lumbardhi i Pejës, which is the water source for the region.

The White Drin waterfall is located at the mouth of the White Drin River. It is 25 m (82 ft) high and is located at the 6th kilometer of the canyon.

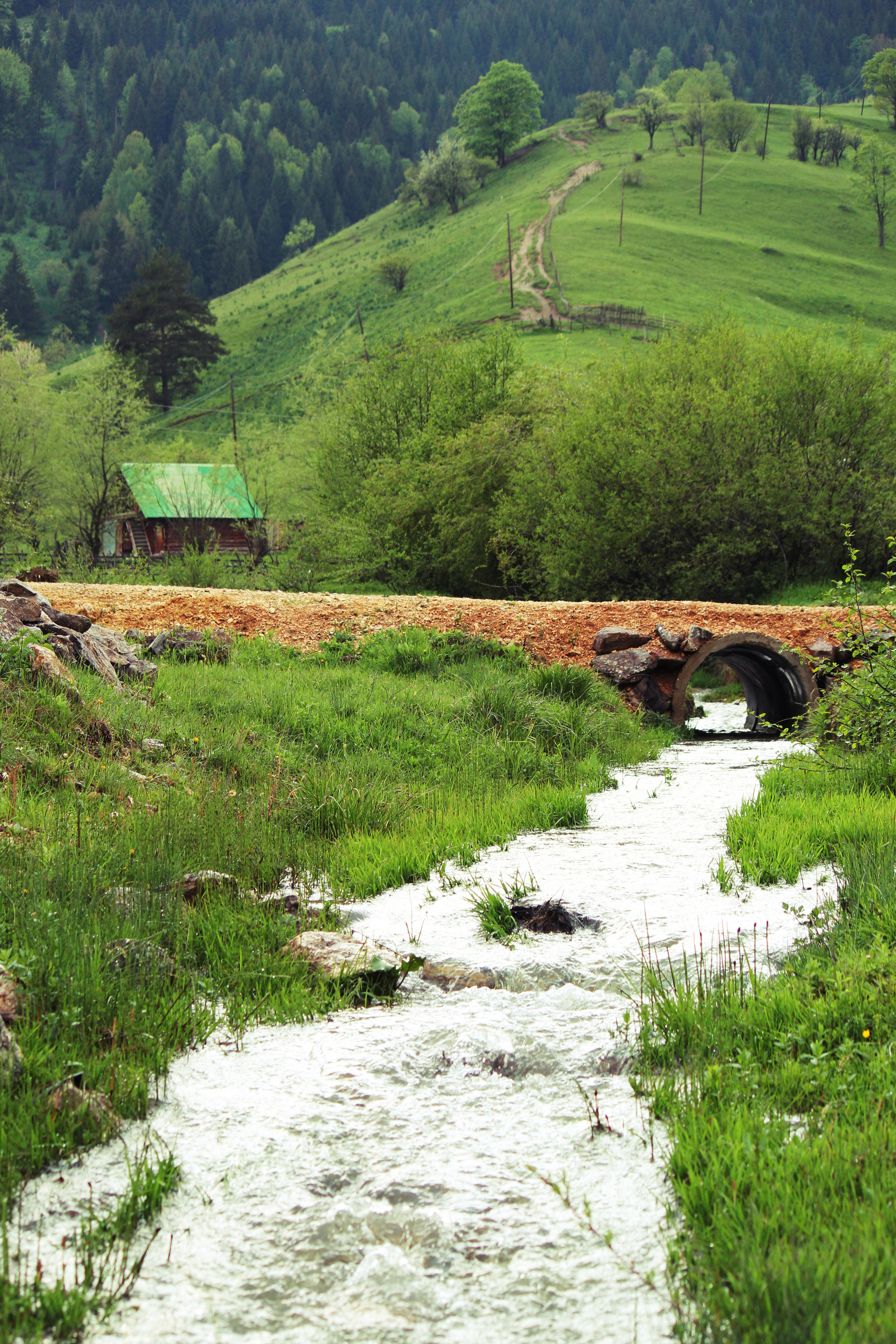
A water flow

On the northern side of the river, are the following landmarks:

- Gurra e Saku Ramës (a fountain) and Shentë e Pepajve at the 18th kilometer.
- Gërka e Koshutanit, gathers the water of three villages, and the so-called Sheun e keq, in the 17th kilometer.
- Sheu i Rek Allagës, which collects water from the Fountain of Hajlës and from three villages, and then flows into the river.
- Sheu i Nikçve which brings water from Lugu i Shtedimit and Sheu i Llazeve, passes by two corn mills and flows into the river at the 13th kilometer.
- The river of Shushica is in the east part of the region, and flows into the Drin River (Drini i Bardhë).
- Small streams flow from the southern part of the region, for example, Sheu i Llazit të mullinit, flows into the river at the 19th kilometer.
- Sheu i Përvarës, which brings water from Lumbardhi and Guri i Kuq, and flows into the river.
- The Milisheva river flows into the Lumbardhi river at the 4th kilometer.

These streams are very strong, especially during the rainy seasons spring, autumn, and at the end of winter, and cause erosion along the stream and river beds. The water in these streams is potable, especially at the beginning of their flows. The many rivers and streams contribute to sports and tourism in these regions.

=== Speleology ===
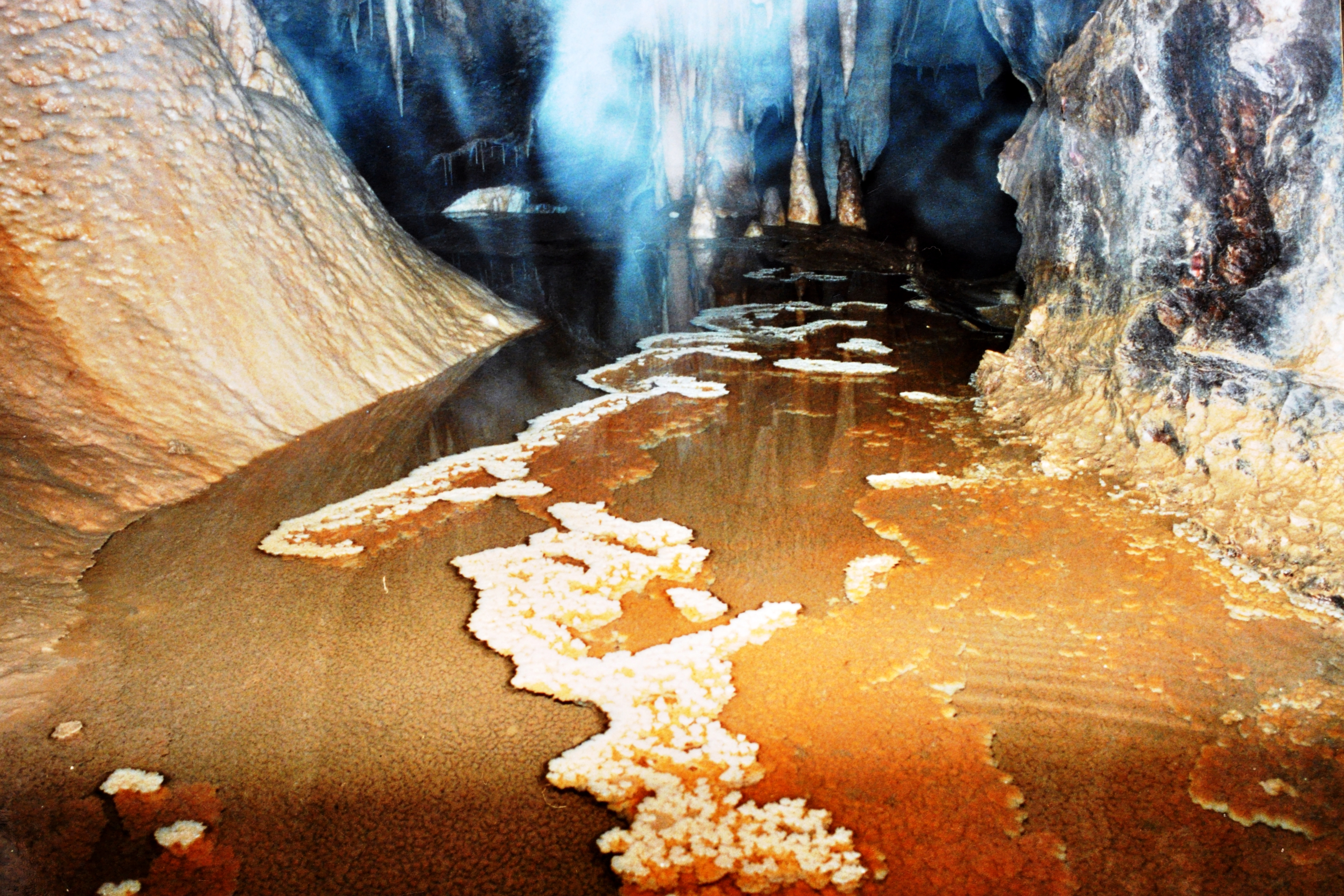
Great Cave

There are caves all over Rugova, although they have not been fully explored. The caves have been shelters for refugees, not only from Rugova, but Albanians from all areas. Some of the largest caves are: Karamakazi Cave (3rd kilometer), Cave of Ruta e Gurrës (Drelaj), Great Cave, and Bukuroshja e Fjetur Cave in the northeast of Rugova.

The great Canyon Cave one of the most interesting caves in the region.

Bukuroshja e Fjetur Cave is the most studied cave and the biggest. At depths of 30–40 m (98–131 ft), Bukuroshja e Fjetur Cave has corridors with water. At greater depths, there are three small lakes. A human femur bone was found in the cave which is estimated to be over 2.40 m and a container with a capacity of 80-100L. Bukuroshja e Fjetur Cave can hold about 30,000 people, similar to the population of Peja during 2001.

=== Morphometry ===
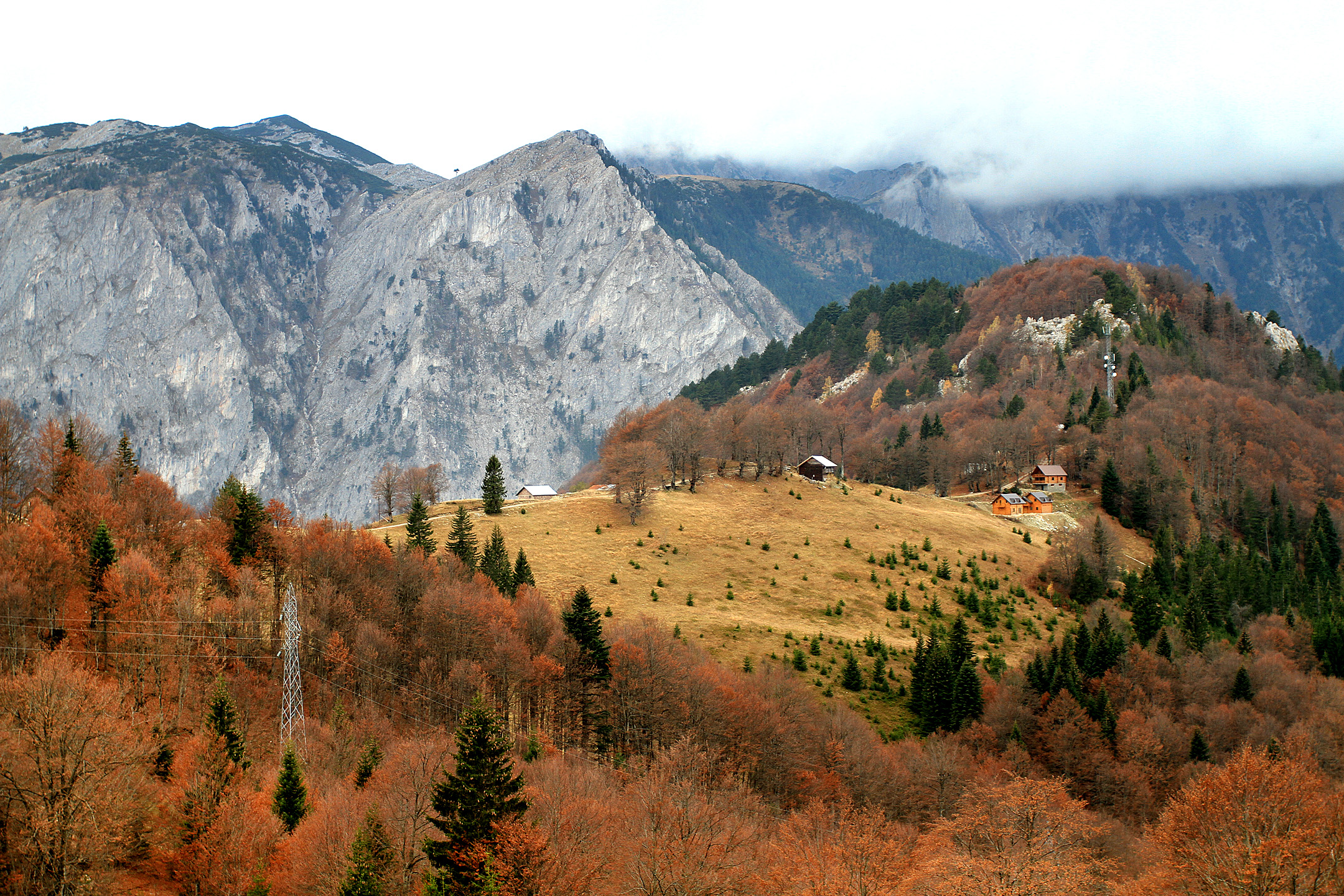
Cochoo's Neck, Shtupeqi i Vogel

During the Ice Age, the Albanian Alps were covered with ice up to Vermosh, the northernmost village in Rugova. The layer of ice was thicker in Rugova, compared to the other mountain regions in Kosovo. Therefore, there are more glacial forms, especially in the crests of the mountains where glacial lakes formed, such as Lake Kuqishta and Lake Drelaj.

Much of the glacier melted into the Mbushtria River, and into the Lumbardhi and Ibri rivers in Rozhaja, forming regions of thick, stratified moraine.

The Peja glacier which was 25 m (82 ft) long, formed the Rugova Gorge, leaving large amounts of moraine material, 260 m (850 ft), which was the biggest moraine in the Balkans region.

Low relief settlements along the Mbushtria river include Shtupeqi i Madh and Kuqishta village.

Shaped pit settlements include Drelaj, Koshutan, Haxhaj and Llaz-Bellopaqi, which is the deepest pit in the region, formed by tectonic movements or it might be a crater of a volcano.

Kuqishta and Shkreli are in the form of hills. Shtupeqi i Madh is on a valley slope, Pepaj, Malaj and Shtupeqi i Vogël are on steep slopes, and Dugaiva is on a plateau.

Rugova is an area of natural hazards such as landslides, rock slides and collapses.

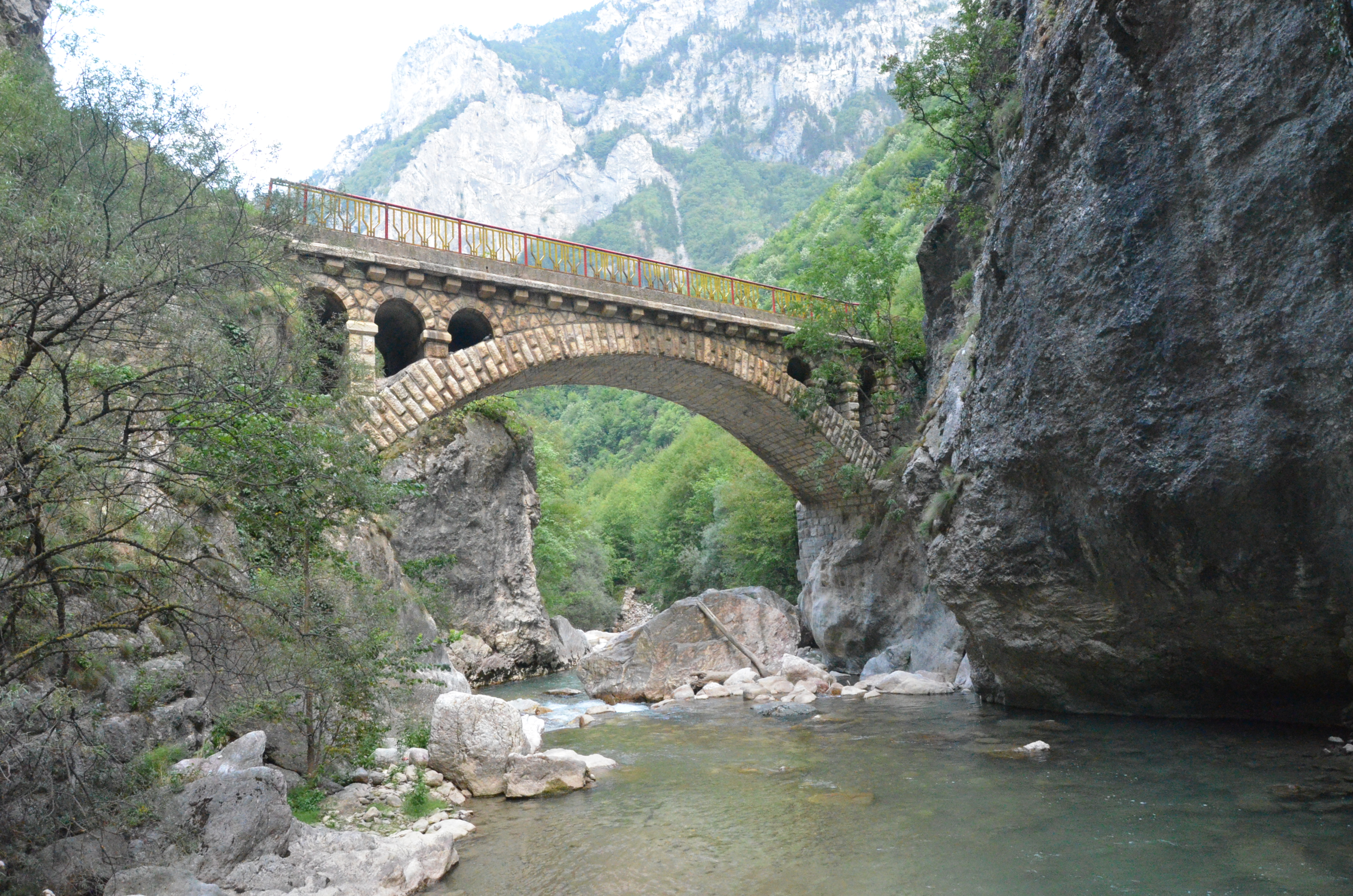
Rugova Canyon

At the ninth kilometer is the area where an avalanche started, from Bjeshka e Lumbardhit, crossed the river Mbushtria, and blocked the road with 6–8 m (20–26 ft) snow. Meanwhile, at the fifteenth kilometer, an avalanche occurs periodically. In 1982, due to deforestation, a large avalanche went through the village of Koshutan, and 11 residents died.

== Flora and Fauna ==
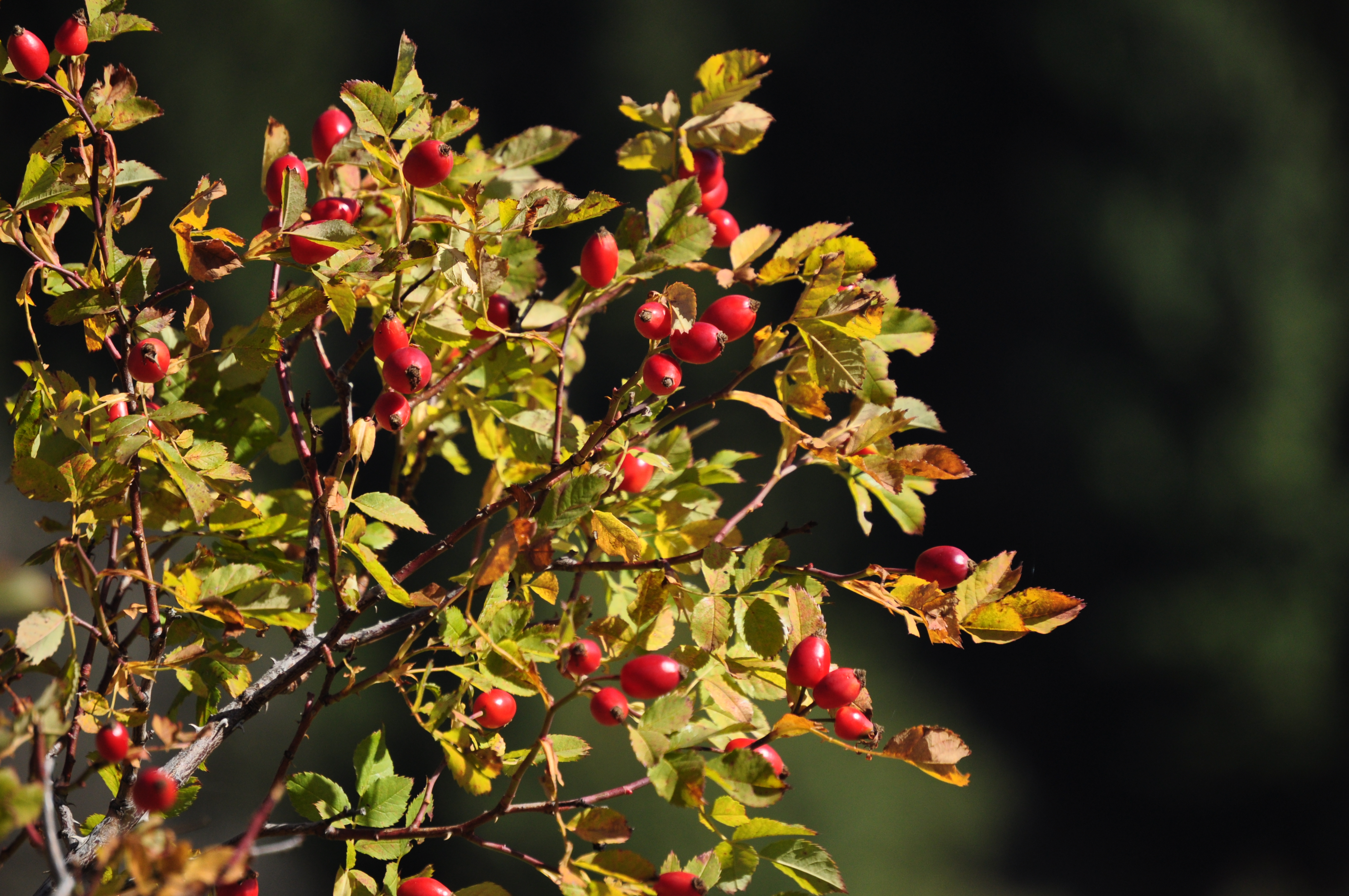
Kaça (Rose hip), a typical fruit in the region

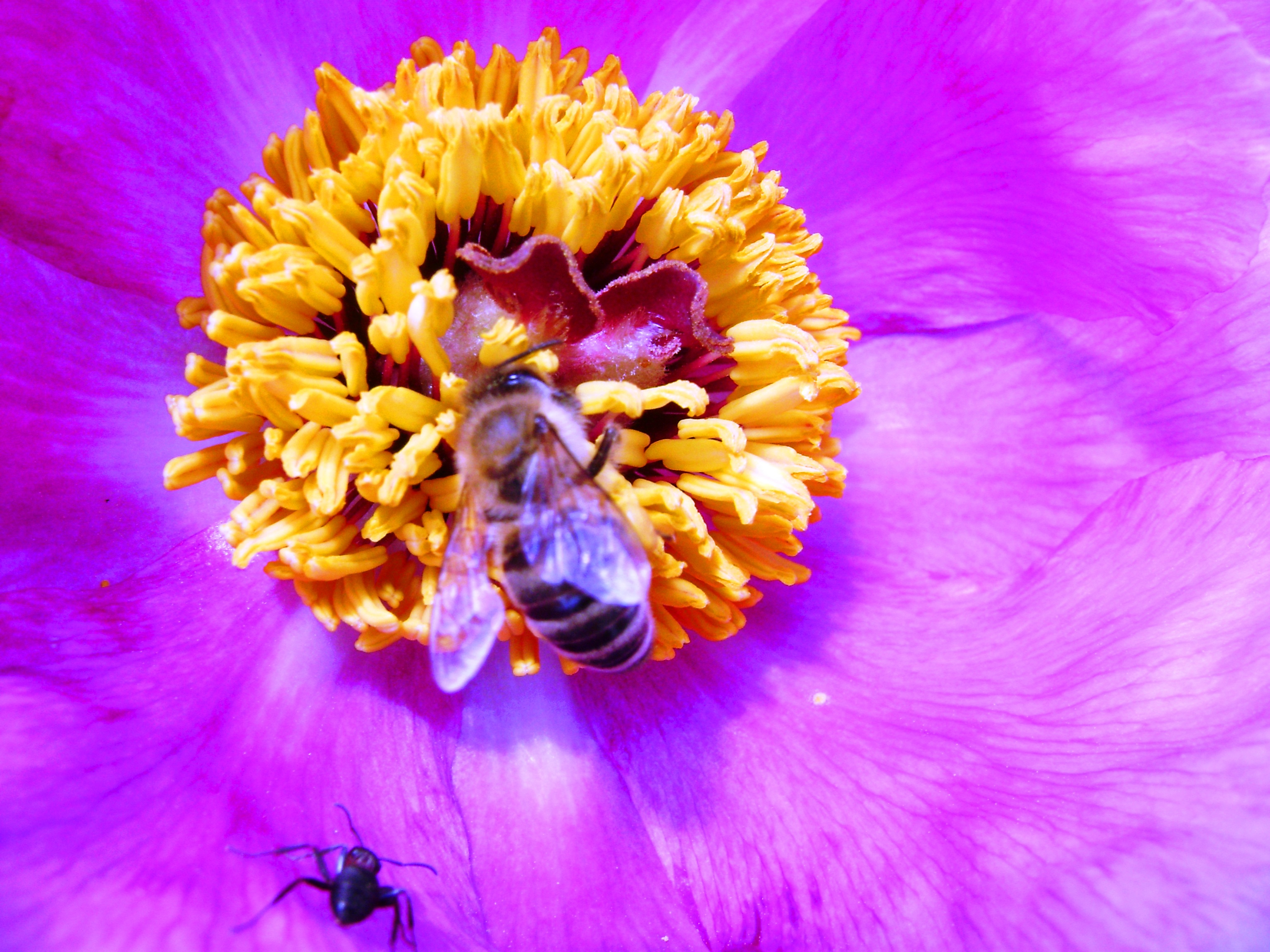
A flower in Rugova

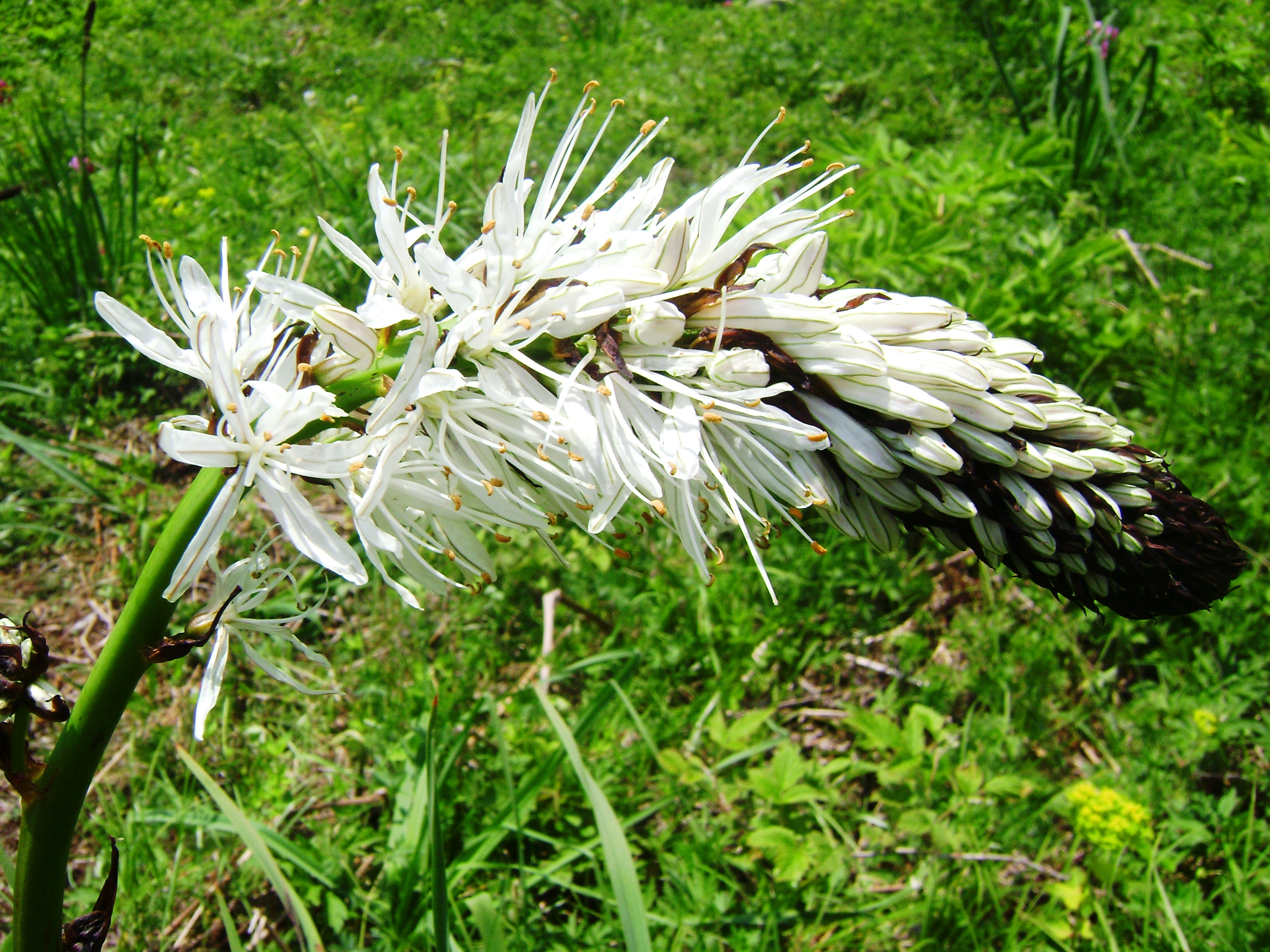
Farëzhveshurat

Rugova has a multitude of habitats such as meadows and pastures, subalpine and alpine scrub brush, forest oak, beech and coniferous trees, foothills, pit slopes, streams and ravines, river water, fountain wells, caves, karst pits, wet soil, limestone, massive rocks, and shed stones.

The variety of habitats indicates a high diversity of vegetation.

Rugosa has flora that is typical of central Europe at high altitudes, but it also has plants that are unique to the Balkans. The region is composed of four zones:

=== Oak forest zone ===
The oak forest zone lies at 800–1,000 m (2,600–3,300 ft). It mainly occupies the lower part of the region and is represented by mulberry (Morus), oak (Quercus), and Qarri. There is also hop hornbeam (Ostrya carpinifolia), maple (Acer monspessulanum), and ash (Fraxinus). Herbaceous plants include Tërfil (Clover), Vjollcë (Violet), vetch (Vicia), Flokëzi, sweet-clover (Melilotus), and Zhabinat.

=== Beech forest zone ===
The beech zone lies above the oak zone, at a height of 1,000–1,600 m (3,300–5,200 ft), but it can be found in lower areas as well. The forest in this zone has been harvested for use as coal and for heating. Therefore, the forest is young, with thin trees and shrubs. Low vegetation is rare and favors the growth of fungi.

=== Coniferous forest zone ===
The coniferous zone reaches up to 2,200 m (7,200 ft) in altitude, making it the highest limit of tree vegetation. These forests are composed of black pine, white spruce, and black spruce. Coniferous forests are dense, and the plant cover is composed of kserofile (xerophyte) vegetation that favours fungi growth. Herbaceous plants include Fiershqipja (Pteridophyte), strawberries, blueberries, and blackberries.

=== Alpine pasture zone ===
This zone is characteristically lacking in forest. This zone is mainly composed of herbaceous plants and shrubs. The main species are:

- Fam. Graminaceae – grasses (Flokësi, Fleumi i alpeve, barëgjaku)
- Fam. Papilionaceae – clover (Tërfili i alpeve)
- Fam. Compositae (Njëmijëfletëshi, Shmanga, Asteri, Pelini)
- Fam. Rosaceae – roses (Zorreca or Potentilla apenina)
- Fam. Campanula – bellflowers (Lule këmbana, C.Albanica)
- Fam. Brassicaceae (Boronica e zezë, Boronica e kuqe, Rrushi i Arushës)
- Fam. Fabaceae
- Fam. Caryophyllaceae – carnations (Bari i egër or Festuca sp)
- Fam. Campanulaceae (Xhufka and Shtara)

The types of vegetation are:

1. Oak forest, 600–1,000 m (2,000–3,300 ft)
2. Beech Forest, 800–1,000 m (2,600–3,300 ft)
3. Coniferous forest (Rrobulli), 1,300–2,200 m (4,300–7,200 ft)
4. Broadleaf forest
5. Mediterranean Coniferous forest
6. Mesophyte Herbaceous plants
7. Xerophyte Herbaceous plants

Campanula foliosa is a perennial plant that grows in subalpine meadows and forests. In Rugova, this plant can be found in Neqinat.

Phyteuma orbiculare is a perennial herb of alpine pastures. In Rugova it is found on the peak of Rusolia.

Asyneuma trichocalycinum is a perennial herb of subalpine forests. This plant is also found in Neqinat.

=== Fauna ===
Rugova includes a variety of habitats, suitable for an abundance of living organisms.

Domestic animals, such as sheep, horses, donkeys, and mules, are also of great importance in Rugova, .

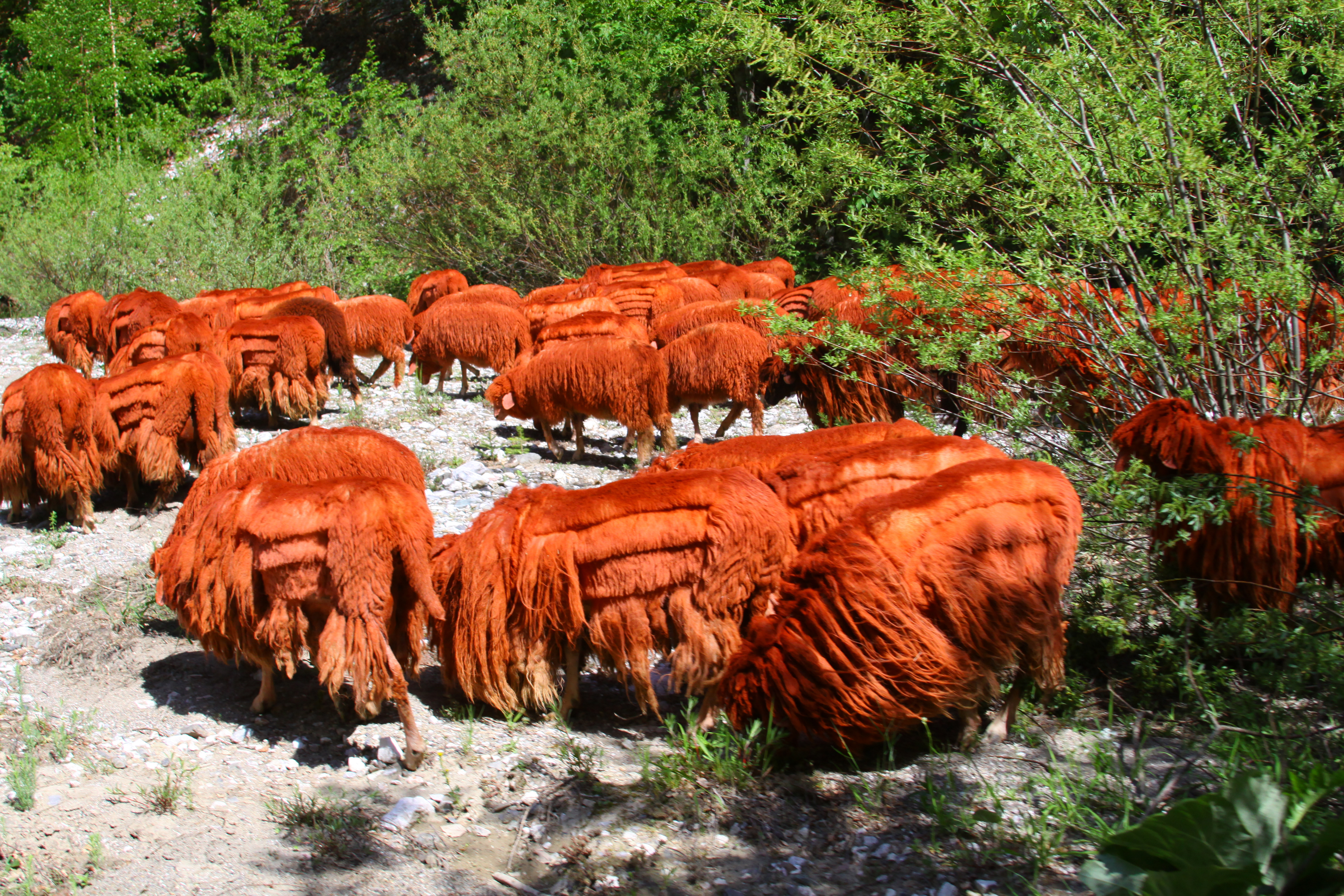
Colored sheep

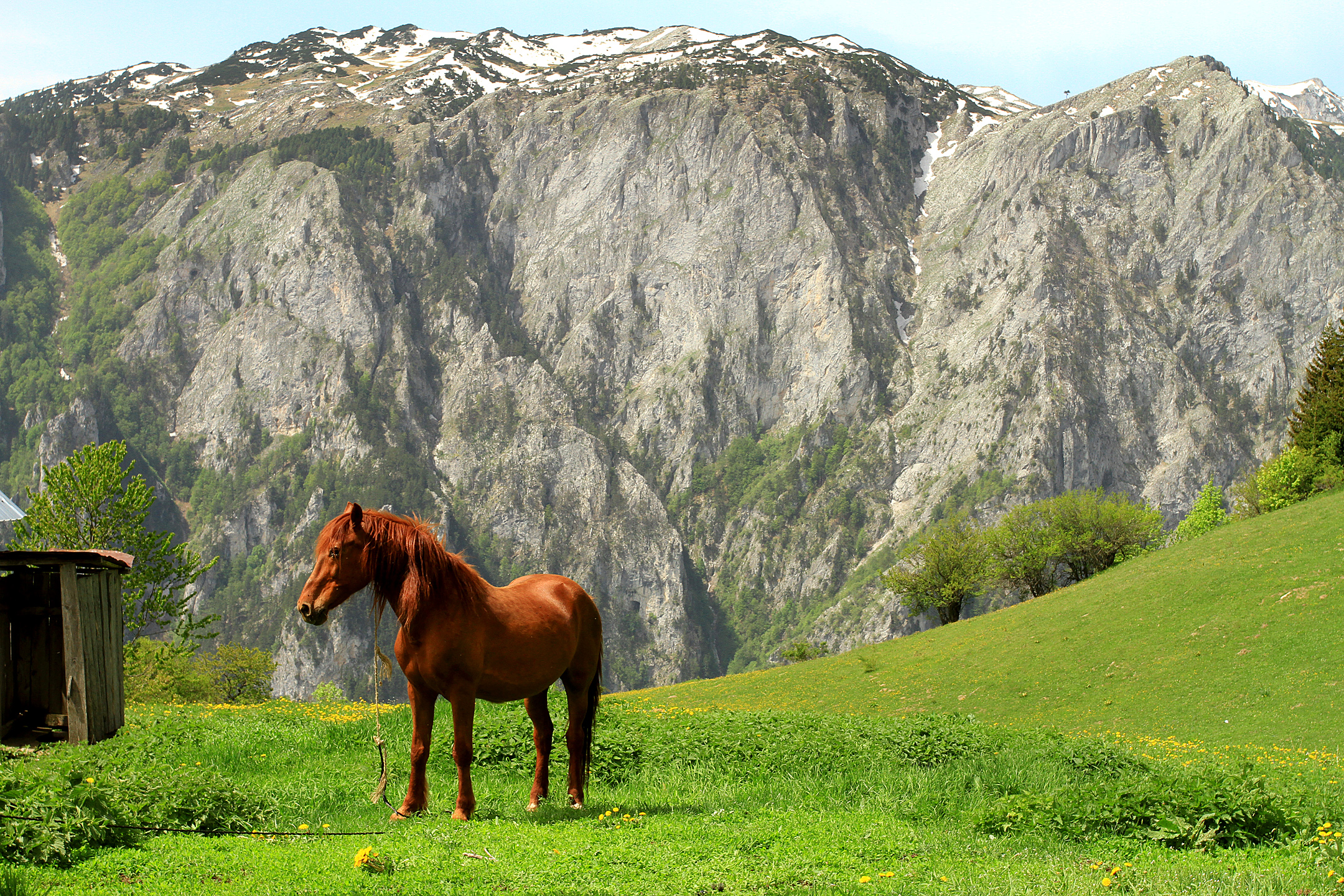
Paradise horse in Rugova

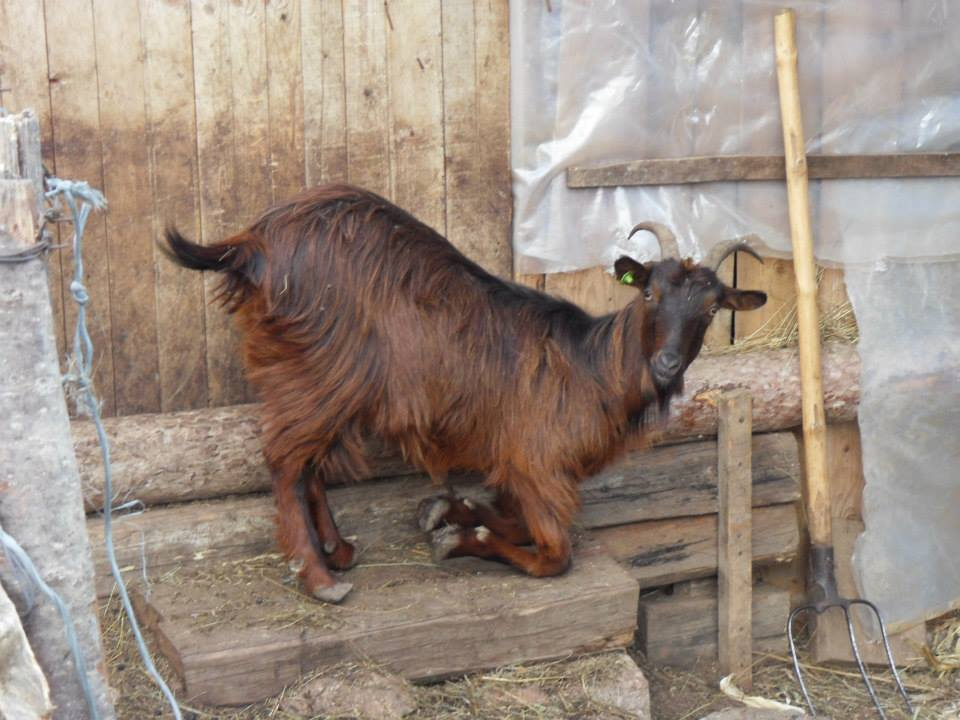
A goat

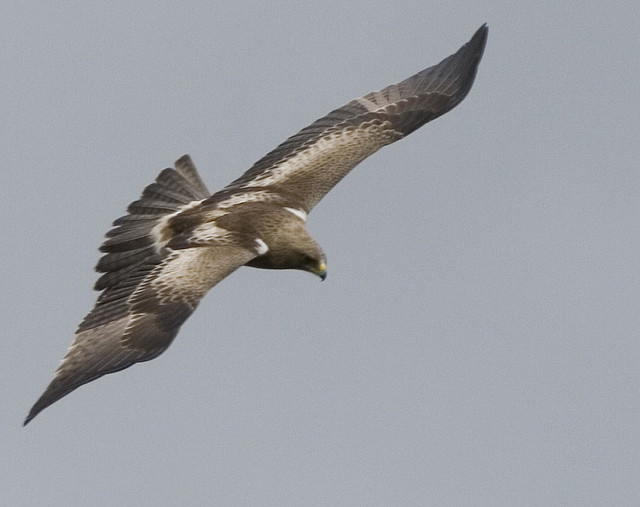
Hieraaetus

Order Insectivora
Family Grilidae (crickets)
Order Rodentia
Family Sciuridae (red squirrel)
Family Muridae (rodents)
Order Chisoptera
Family Rhinolophidae (horseshoe bat)
Order Carnivora
Family Ursidae (bears)
Family Canidae (dogs)
Order Lagomorpha
Family Leporidae (rabbits)
Order Artiodactyla
Family Suidae (ungulates)
Other mammals
Family Erinacidae (hedgehogs)
Family Talpidae (moles)
Family Soricidae (shrews)

Birds in the Rugova region include:

- Golden eagle (Aquila chrysaetos)
- Rock partridge (Alectoris greaca)
- Griffin vulture (Gyps fulvus)
- Rock dove (Columba livia)
- Common cuckoo (Cuculus canorus)
- Little owl (Carine noctua)
- European green woodpecker (Picus viridis)
- Common raven (Corvus corax)
- Hooded crow (Corvua cornix)
- House sparrow (Passer domesticus)
- Booted eagle (Hieraaetus pennatus)
- Common chaffinch (Fringilla coelebs)
- House sparrow (Passer domesticum)
- Eurasian sparrowhawk (Accipiter nisus)

Insects of Rugova include:

- Ditëshkurtët,
- Flatrafortët dhe
- Fluturat (butterfly)

Fish that can be found are :

- Brown trout (Salmo trutta fario)
- Troftë Mali e bujanash lumore (a river trout, Salmo trutta macrostigma)
- Marble trout (Salmo marmoratus cuver)
- Gudgeon (Gobio gobio lepidolaemus)

== Demography ==
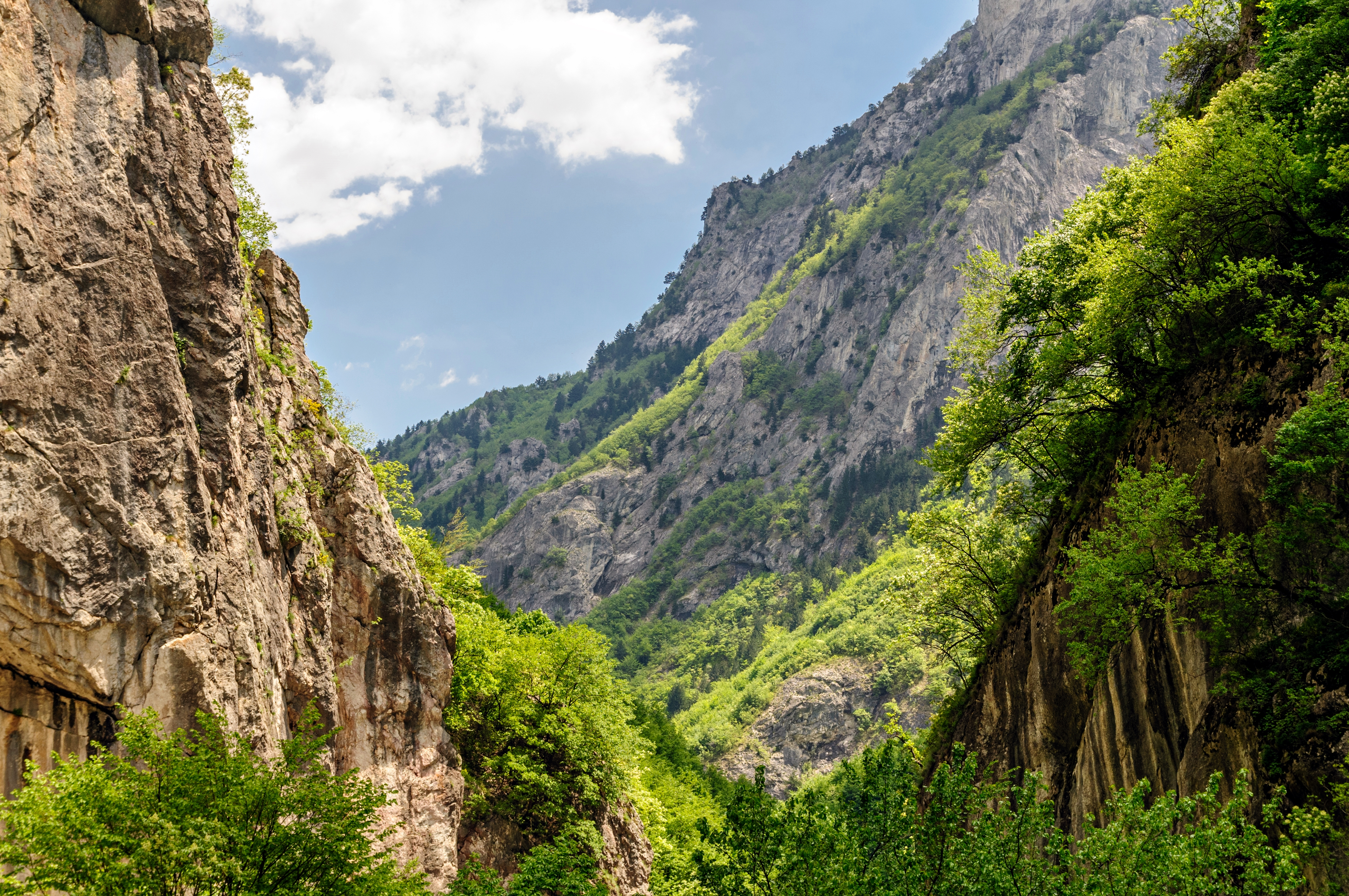
Rugova Canyon

Ethnically, Rugova is a pure area with a population of approximately 100 inhabitants known as Gheg Albanians who came from Kelmend (Malësia e Madhe). Therefore, the population is divided into tribes who are part of the Kelmend region: Lajç, Nikç, Muriq, Vukël and Selcë. According to legend, the tribes were created by the four sons of the tribe leader, with the origin from Bishtanini. The sons of Nikë Deda came to the land of Rugova, and they gave the villages names that reflected their origins, such as Drelaj from Dreli, Stankaj from Stank, Pepaj (Pepiq) from Pepi, Nokshiq from Noku. However, some people settled here because of the feud.

The first official census dates back to 1484, found in documents of the Ottoman Empire for Shkodra. According to these documents, during the 15th century Rugova had 69 houses with 114 inhabitants. There are also data for some villages that were separate from Rugova: Shtupeq had 38 houses and Boga had 2 houses.

For more than 436 years, there is no data on the population. Because of the hostilities with the regime, inhabitants frequently boycotted registrations.

Since 1921, villages organized censuses themselves, as shown in the table:

| Year | Inhabitants |
|---|---|
| 1921 | 915 |
| 1931 | 2176 |
| 1948 | 2873 |
| 1953 | 3097 |
| 1961 | 3275 |
| 1971 | 3368 |
| 1981 | 2451 |

| Years | Birth rate |
|---|---|
| 1948–1953 | +7.7% |
| 1953–1961 | +5.7% |
| 1961–1971 | +2.8% |
| 1971–1981 | −27.2% |
| 1948–1981 | −14.6% |

| Year | Women | Men |
|---|---|---|
| 1900–2000 | 49.14% | 50.86% |

A lot of emigration out of Rugova occurred because of war. The greatest effect was after World War II and, especially, after the 1960s when pressure from the Yugoslavian regime increased.

=== Life in Rugova ===
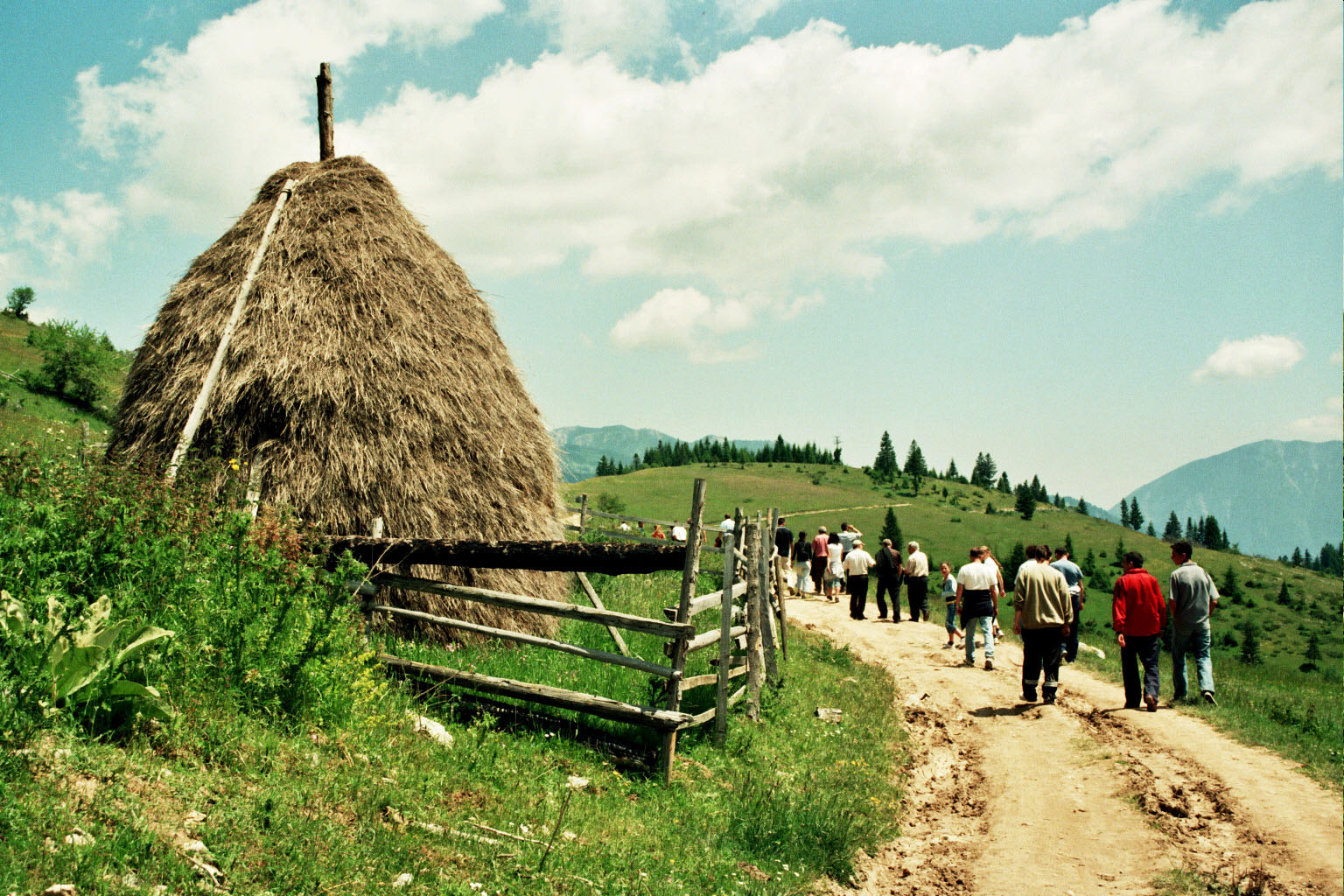
A view from a village

Rugova was part of Sanjak of Scutari which was isolated from the rest of the Ottoman Empire. For a long period of time, they could trade only with Shkodra. However, starting in 1959, Rugova belonged to the municipality of Peja.

The tribal organization of Rugova had changed little since medieval times since the only law was the Kanun of Lek Dukagjini, codified in the 15th century, which governed the entire lifestyle. House-like towers held 50–70 members, and each house had its own family background which determined how they were treated by society, whether with great honour or humiliation.

Rugovans are mostly involved with livestock farming, though their lifestyle has gone through changes. Long ago, many families had up to 1000 sheep, and 50 cows and horses. During the winter, nomadic shepherds would move to the Dukagjin Region and in Peshter, Montenegro for months until the winter was over. The head shepherd was an illiterate and a self-taught veterinarian.

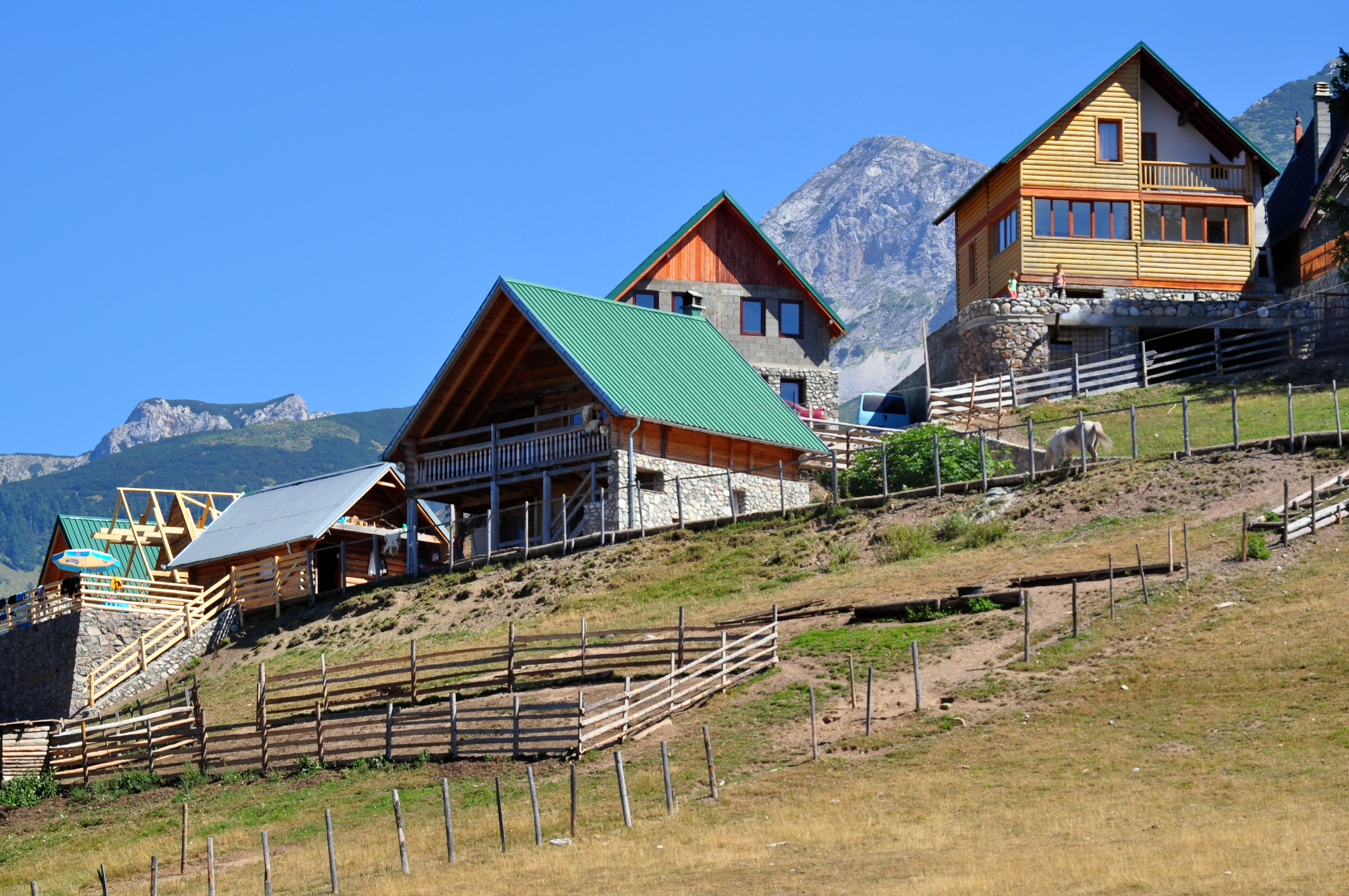
Cabins

Due to the physical barriers in the area, Rugovians would only marry within their mountain territory. However, they would never marry someone from their own tribe. These traditions have changed in recent times.

Rugovian nights were characterized by gatherings of men in oda (chambers) where traditional games were played and songs were sung to instruments such as the lahuta and çiftelia. The odas were lighted only by pine or kerosene lamps until 1983, when Rugovians rejected the Yugoslav government and electrified the region.

The typical Rugovian woman has an important role in the family; they are treated equally to men and often fight next to their men during war. At times, women rejected their female role and took on the role of men. These women were called burrnesha; they changed their names, did not marry, attended odas, and led their families, similar to the Amazons of mythology.

Apart from housework and raising children, women were traditionally involved in handcrafting, and sewing clothes and qylyms (rugs).

Rugovians celebrate Spring day, Saint George's Day (Shengjergj) and they are highly devoted to their traditional games.

=== Religion ===
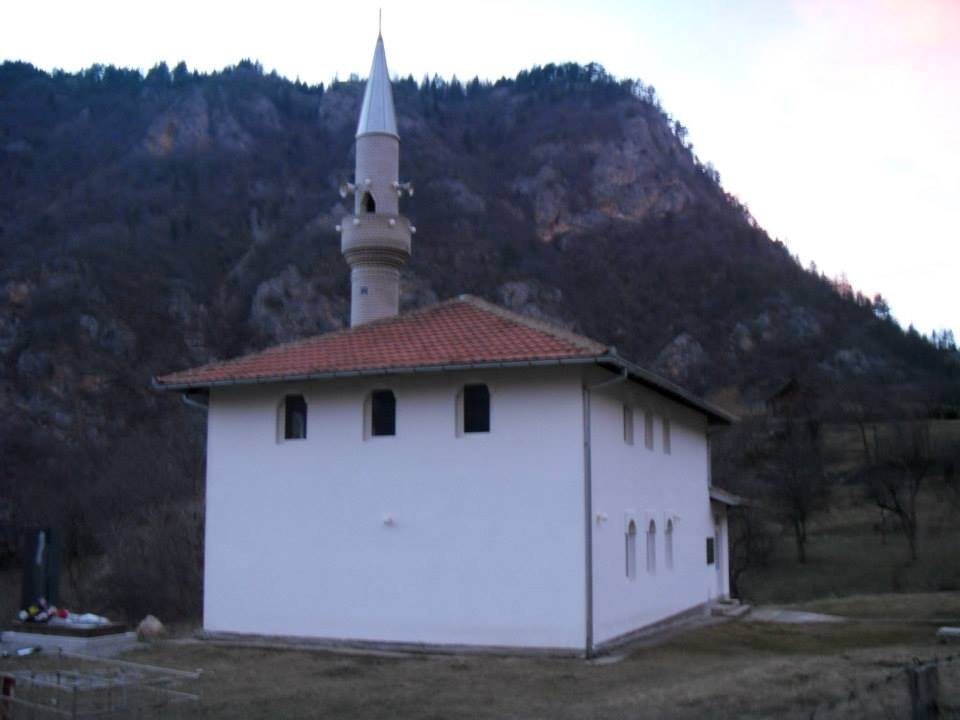
Mosque in Drelaj

Rugovians are not thought to have been very religious historically, and have not been particularly concerned with the difference between being Muslim or Catholic. Their practice is filled with many elements of paganism. Nevertheless, until 1703, there were no traces of Islam, whereas other regions had already converted to that religion.

Many parts of Rugova would believe in Albanian mythology, with characters such as fairies (Zana), Drangues, Kulshedra and snakes as well as magic. One of the most notable figures that the people of Rugova would believe in would be the "Mountain Nymph" (Zana e malit) which lived in the Nymph waterfall near the village of Malaj. According to oral beliefs, if seen the nymph would turn the person who saw her into stone with her "beauty". (Note: According to the interpretive sign at the entrance to the waterfall.)

In the 20th century, the Rugovians struggled to protect their religion and refused to convert to Orthodoxy. Hundreds of Rugovians died in these wars.

All of the 13 villages had churches until they were destroyed by the Ottomans. The first mosque was built in Drelaj in 1915, the second in Koshutan, and the third one in Shtupeq i Vogel. The first imam was Mulla Sylë Rugova. All of the imams of Rugova's mosque, lived in Peja. Today in Rugova, there is one church in Kuqishte and the remaining mosques are in Drelaj and Shtupeq i Vogel. Also, Peja's Patriarchate, a Serbian Orthodox monastery, is situated at the entrance of Rugova Canyon. It was built in the 13th century, and is the spiritual seat of Serbian archbishops. Since 2003, it has been protected by UNESCO. Before that, it was protected for more than 300 years by a Rugovian family with the title "vojvoda", meaning "sentry".

== Culture and tradition ==
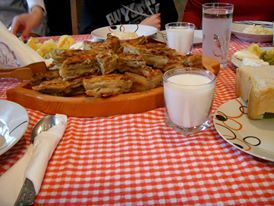
Rugovian extendable table

The Cursed Mountains in general, and Rugova in particular, are known for traditions and customs. These traditions are seen in their costume, dance, dialect, and traditional games.

Cultural investments in the area have grown steadily. The amphitheatre in Malaj has been restored, and is currently being used for cultural meetings, and the amphitheatre in Reka e Allages is used for "Film Fest" presentations.

Traditional foods that continue to be prepared include flia, leqeniku (cornbread), shëllira, maza e zier and cheese produced by traditional methods by local farmers.

=== Costumes ===
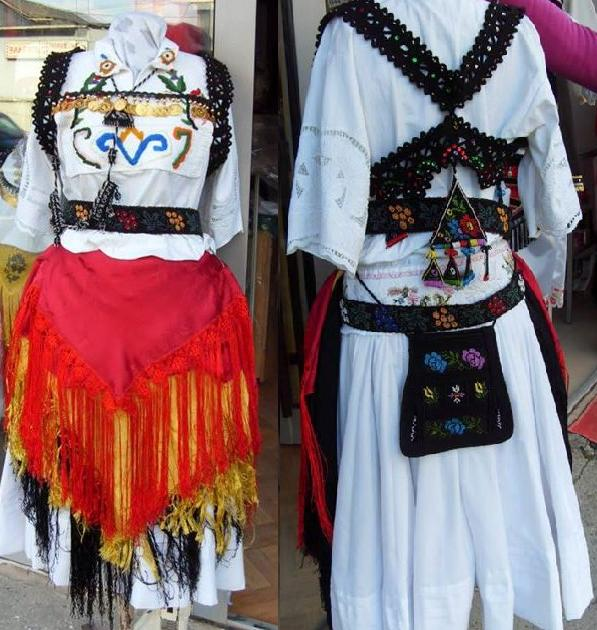
Rugovian Women's clothing

Rugova has its own traditional costumes and there are significant regional differences in women's clothing.

Women's dress is filled with embroidery and beads with different colors and symbols. It consists of a tufted caul with short sleeves. A dress is worn over that, embroidered with 120 parts, combined with a belt. A black vest is worn over the caul, called a kracë. Qystek (a golden chain) goes around the neck and reaches to the waist. An apron is worn over the other articles of clothing. On the front apron are handkerchiefs, and on the back, are pështjellaku with a shoke circling the waist.

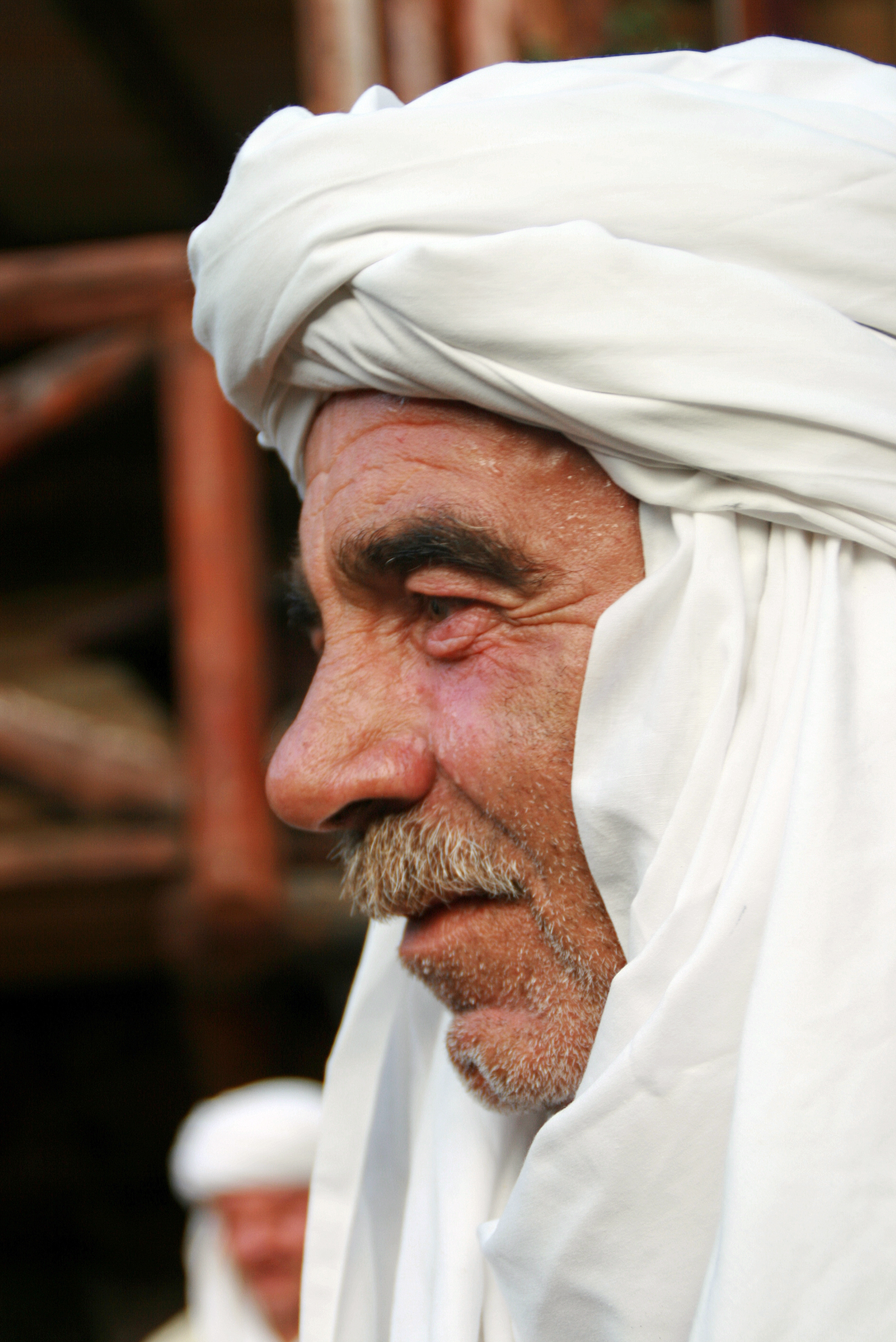
Rugovian white maud

A red headscarf is placed on the head, black sleeves from wrist to elbow, and black socks. Leather shoes are worn by both men and women.

Men wear white woolen pants (tirqi) with a caul, sash, vest and a black tunic (xhurdi). The qeleshe is a felt hat that is seen all over Albania. Men also wear a white scarf (maud) on their heads. It is over three meters long and is worn from age 7 until death. The maud is used as a burial shroud after death.

Examples of tirqi in other parts of the world are braies in Gaul and the kilt in Scotland which resemble the Bavarian kilotons.

=== Pyrrhic Dance ===
The Pyrrhic Dance (or Warrior Dance of Rugova) has traditionally been performed by mountain dwellers. This dance was based on the Korybantes (guards of the baby Zeus). The Korybantes prevented Cronus from finding the place where his son, Zeus, was hidden, by clashing their swords to cover the cries of the baby. Dorians took this dance to Sparta, Alexander the Great danced it before attacking Persia, and Julius Caesar, after his stay in Illyria, made the dance known in Italy. The Albanologist, Thelloczi, asserts that Illyrians danced with swords in their hands as Albanians do today.

Women dance with handkerchieves. There is also a combined dance in which women and men dance together.

=== Music ===
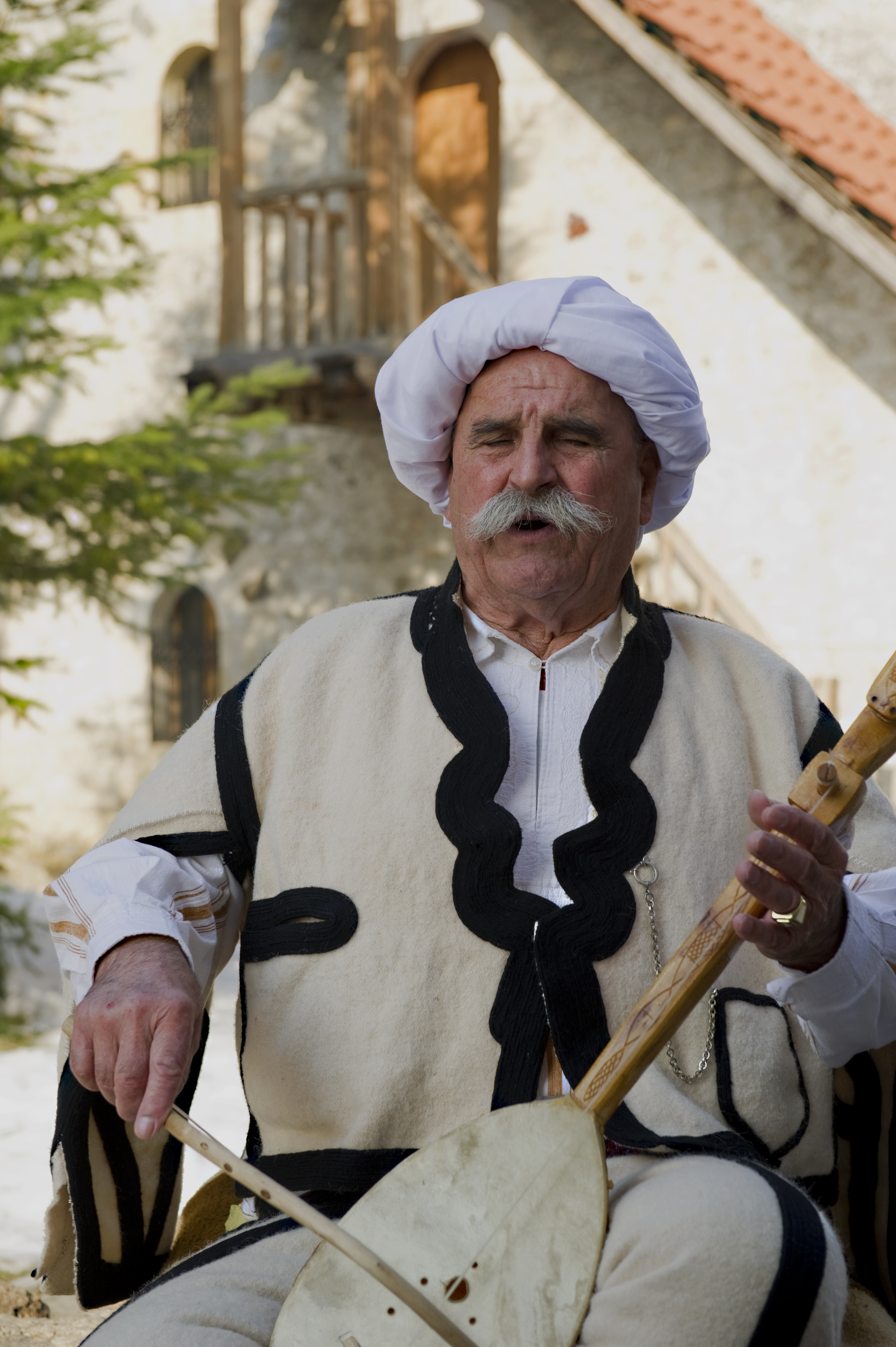
Lahutari

Rugova has homophonic music, similar to the North Albanian region. Music is present in the life of Rugovians, not only at weddings and other important events, but also in daily life. Men used to sing during the meetings in the odas and women while doing their daily work. Music was also played at funerals when a brave and outstanding person died; this kind of singing was considered a particular privilege. Rugova has 54 epic songs dedicated to its heroes.

The most characteristic instruments are the lahuta (lute), the çiftelia and the sharkia. The first man known to play the lahuta was Hysen Selman Husaj (1791–1876).

One of the most important types of traditional singing in this area is top-side singing (majekrahu song). In the past top-side singing was used as a way of communication from one hill to another.

A particular musical piece, the Vallja e Rugovës (Dance of Rugova) is heard at weddings all over Kosovo and Malësia. The Pyrrhic dance is performed with this instrumental.

=== Traditional Games ===
Games have an important place in the culture of Rugova. Every August, residents and immigrants come together to play, dance, and sing, and demonstrate their physical skills. Only men play in these games; there are judges, and awards for the winners. The traditional games have six components:

==== Climbing up a pole ====
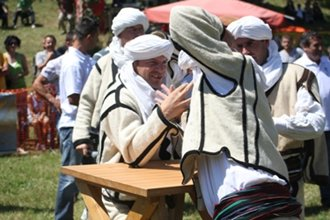
Arm Wrestling

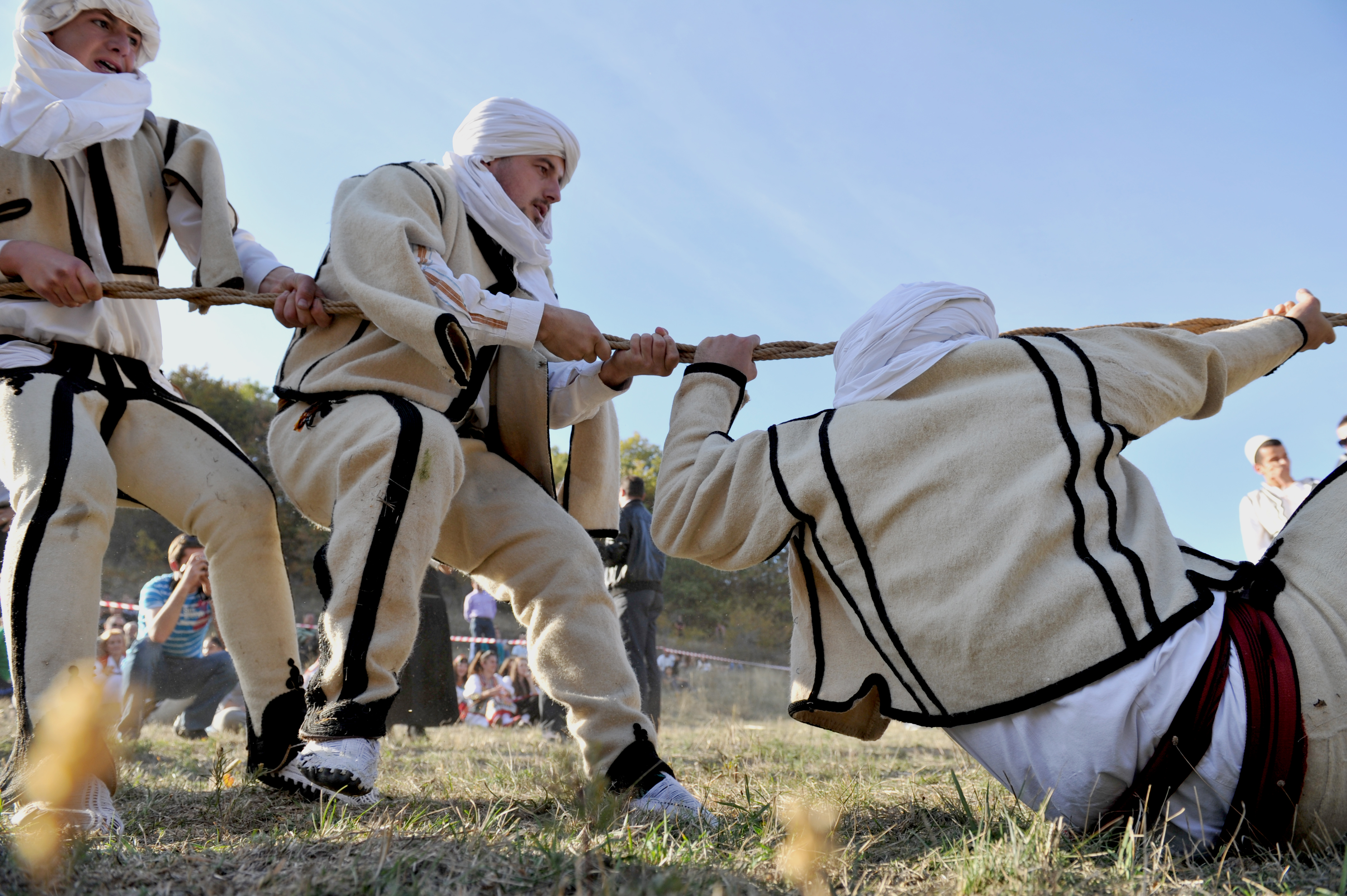
Rope tow team

The goal is to climb an 8 m (26 ft) wooden pole (shilor) and touch the top as soon as possible, without any climbing aids. The one who reaches the top in the shortest period of time is declared the winner.

==== Stone throw ====
The participants throw a stone which weighs about 7 kg (15 lb). The one who throws the stone the furthest is the winner. This discipline originated in antiquity and it was played by the Illyrians. The game called rrasa, which means "shoot by hand" and is played only by shepherds, also comes from antiquity. The symbolism of this game comes from the saying, "Do not touch my land, my stones will judge you".

==== Arm Wrestling ====
There is a special table for this game. Two participants compete against each other, so the race is organized using an elimination system. The game was played by Skanderbeg when he returned from Kruja. Because of this, in Romania it is called the "Skanderbeg Game".

==== Wrestling ====
Free style wrestling is another game. A regular fight lasts for five minutes, but can continue for two more. For every victory, the participant collects points and at the end, the winner is declared based on the collected points.

==== The shot-put ====
This game is based on the throw of a llastar stick (5 m (16 ft) long with a diameter of about 13 cm (5.1 in)). The participants throw it using only their hands. The winner is the one who throws the llastar the farthest.

==== Tug-of-war ====
Each team in this game consists of five members. The rope is thick and about 12 m (39 ft) in length, with a flag in the middle. The team that can pull the rope and the flag to their side is the winner. Usually, this is a competition between two tribes, two villages, or two families.

=== Dialect ===
The dominant dialect in the region is Gheg, with the exception of the diphthong "ua" and certain verbal traits that belong to the Tosk dialect. In composition it uses the Shkodra's dialect; the biggest difference is in the vowels. The letter a is more pronounced, which in articulation sounds like o. In some cases the letter a switches to i, for example "livdoj" instead of "lavdëroj" and "gjimoj" instead of "gjëmoj". The letter e vanishes while talking, for example, "çuditshe" instead of "çuditeshe" and "skuqshe" instead of "skuqeshe". The letter ë is only used before some consonants and in the accusative case. Other notable features are nasalization and denasalization, which means that nasal vowels predominate. Diphthongs are used with the exception of the "oe" which is not heard at all.

== Education ==
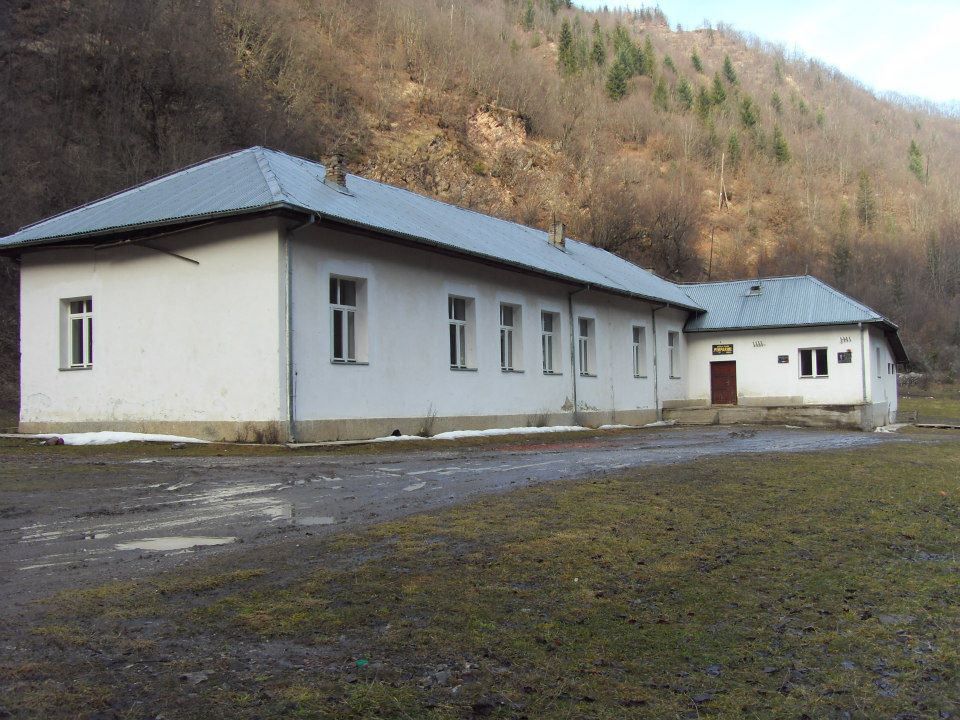
"Përparimi" High School, Drelaj

For a long period of time, education was in the Serbian language, a component of the assimilation pursued by the communists and, later, the Yugoslav government. Resistance to assimilation led to a high level of illiteracy. The majority of the population were illiterate until the first half of the 20th century.

Despite these obstacles, the desire for learning was always present, and classes were held outdoors or in private homes until 1930, when the first elementary school was built in Kuqishte. In 1946, Perparimi Elementary School was opened in Drelaj. In 1952, the first high school was built in Kuqishte and in 1956, the first class of 17 pupils graduated. During the years 1947–1969, eight more schools opened, including branches of "1 Maji" High School in Haxhaj. These schools had many students. During this time, Rugovians were faced with increasing pressure from the Yugoslavs. This is seen in the burning of schools in 1953, the prohibition of income, and the attempts to close schools. Extremely valuable contributions were made by teachers, many of whom were women.

Although there have been obstacles, Rugovian schools have been successful in educating generations of students. The high school, Perparimi, had its own magazine called Gurra in Albanian, which examined the problems that Kosovo faced during that period. During the Kosovo War, the school in Haxhaj was turned into a barracks for the Kosovo Liberation Army, while the school in Drelaj was occupied by Montenegrins.

Nowadays in Rugova, only the high school in Drelaj is still open, and one class in Shtupeqi i Madh. The number of pupils that attend those classes is low.

== Economy ==
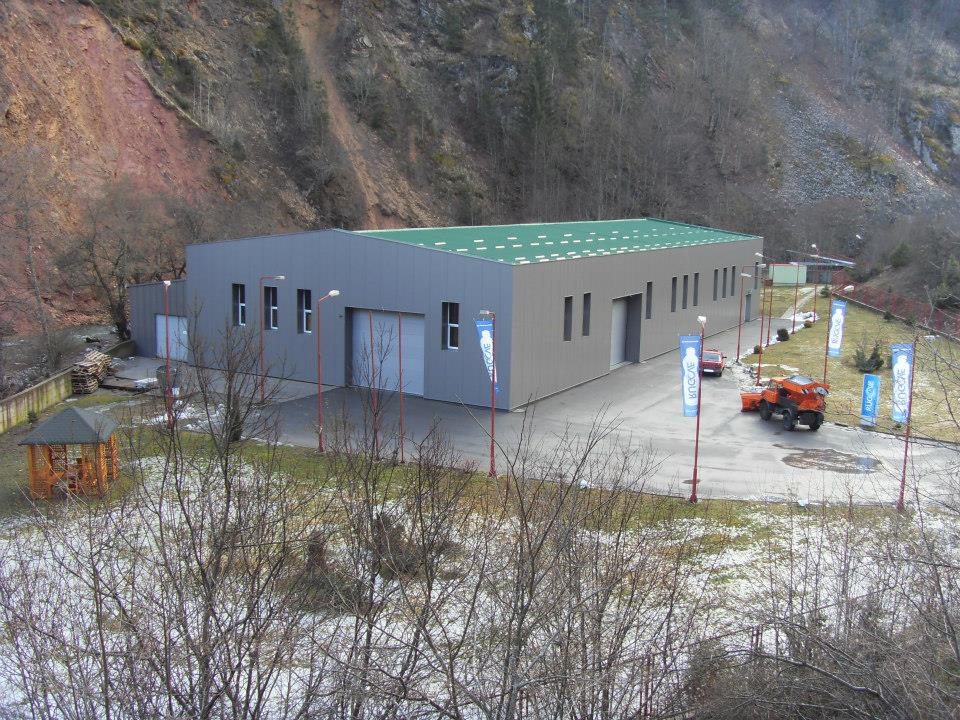
Water factory "Rugove"

The economy of Rugova has always been based on its natural resources and labor. Livestock has played a central role. Rugova supplied the markets of Peja, Plava and Berane. Today, its products are only sold in the Peja markets.

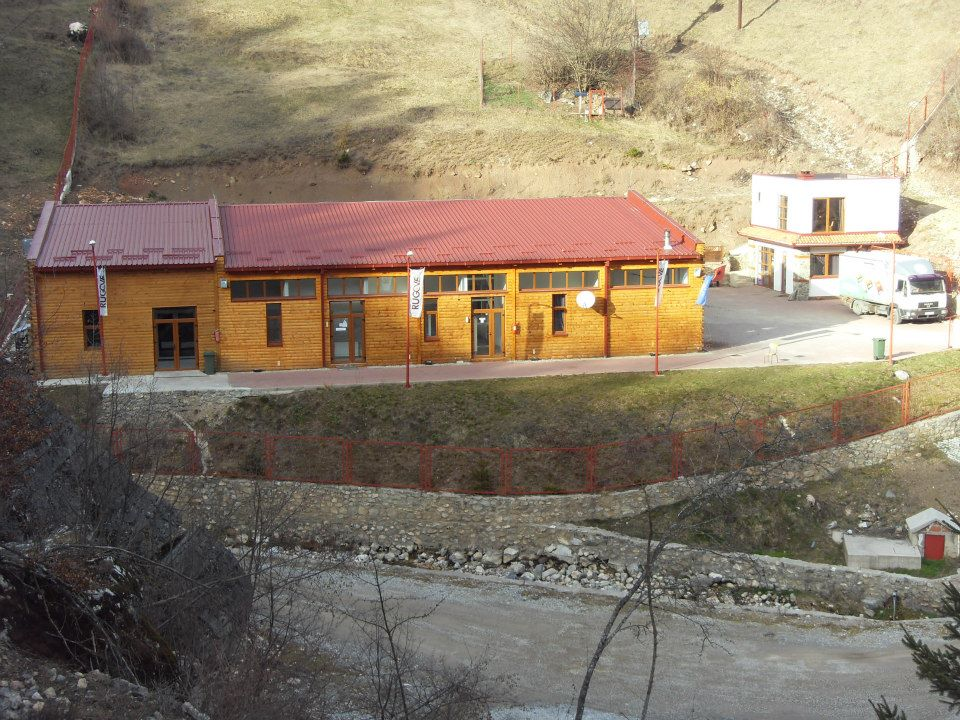
Cheese factory "Rugove"

The forests of Rugova are a very important resource, with agriculture playing a secondary role. In the time of Yugoslavia, an agriculture cooperative was opened, generating jobs for many locals. However, with the fraying of relations between Kosovo and Serbia, the cooperative was closed.

Hydropower has been utilized in Rugova since the end of the war. The power plant is still in operation as well as a cheese factory that is part of the same company.

=== Tourism ===
In recent years, tourism has taken off. Many factors have combined to promote tourism: the mountain climate; the area's natural beauty; the varied flora and fauna; and investments in infrastructure such as stores, hotels, and restaurants to serve and shelter the tourists. The Rock Climbing Association, Marimangat, attracts local and international tourists to the region. This association also enabled the building of a via ferrata (iron road) in 2013, the only one in the Balkans, which makes it safer to climb, otherwise dangerous, routes. There is a "Green Path" which is used for walking and cycling around the mountains. Recently, Rugova's designation as a National Park has added to its prominence as a tourist destination.

Tourism in Rugova is divided into two branches: Business tourism and household tourism.

== Sports ==
Due to its past, sports in Rugova started developing later than in other countries. Today Rugova has several ski areas (one of them is equipped with a cable car), trails for hiking, and facilities for parachuting. Rock climbing and mountaineering are being developed.

=== Skiing ===
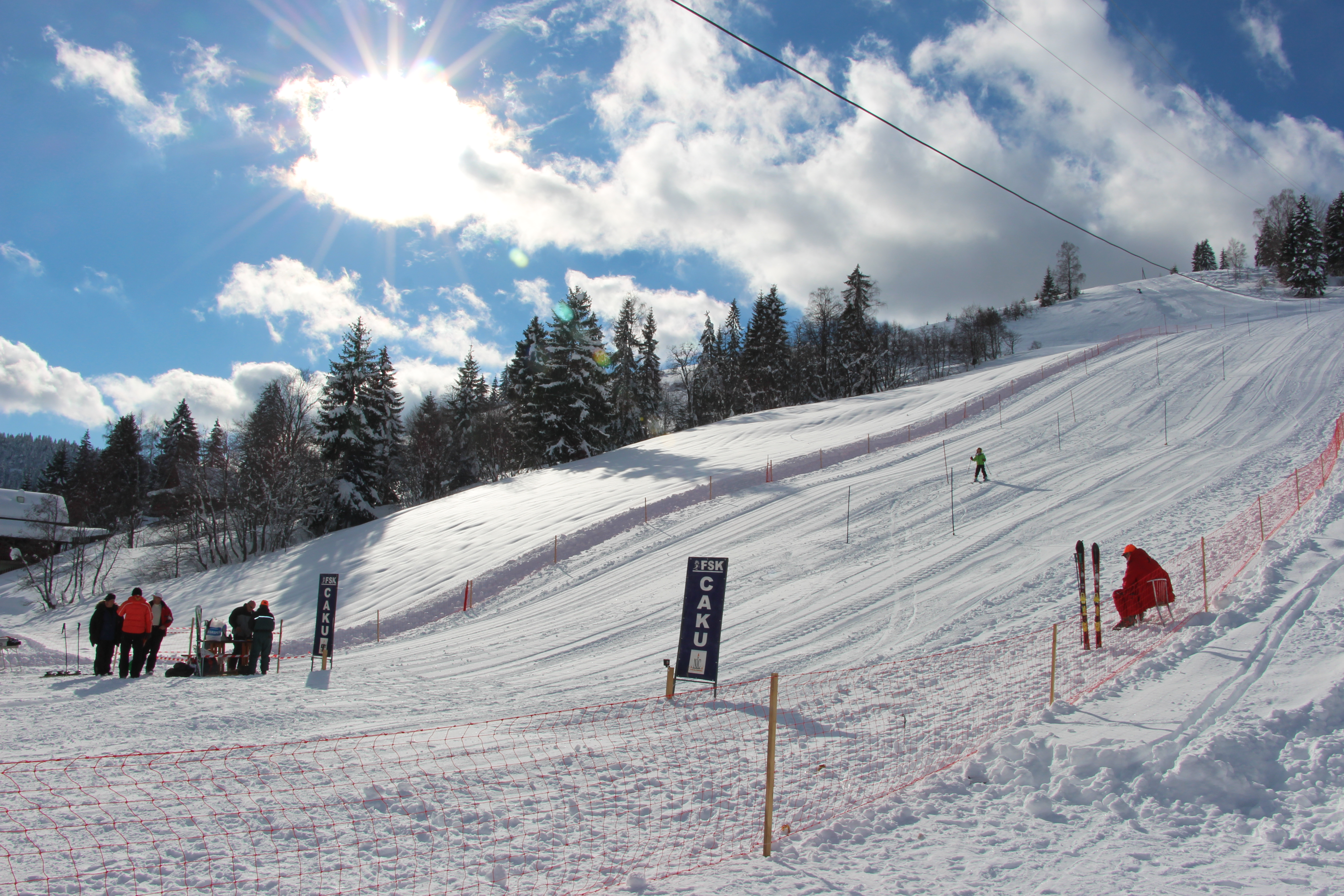
The village of Bogë in Rugova

Before 1974, skiing was a part of mountaineering. Rugova is known as a cradle of skiing in Kosovo and Balkans. Rusolia was the first ski club from which were formed three other groups: Peja, Alpi and Rugova. Rusolia club has participated in the Olympic Games.

The most advanced ski run is in Bogë where there are two skiing schools, Dardani and Ke Luani.

=== Mountaineering ===
Mountaineering as a sporting activity started in Peja in 1928. Free climbing, a type of mountaineering, involves climbing without any tools in the high craggy rocks. Within the mountaineering group is the rescue group which consists of 30–40 people who help in emergencies.

Mountaineers climb in four regions:

- The southern side of the region (6 climbs)
- The western and northern side of the region (1 climb)
- From the centre to the north (3 climbs)
- The northern side (2 climbs)
- The eastern side (1 climb)
