= Kuçishtë =

Kuçishtë Кућиште Kućište
- Village
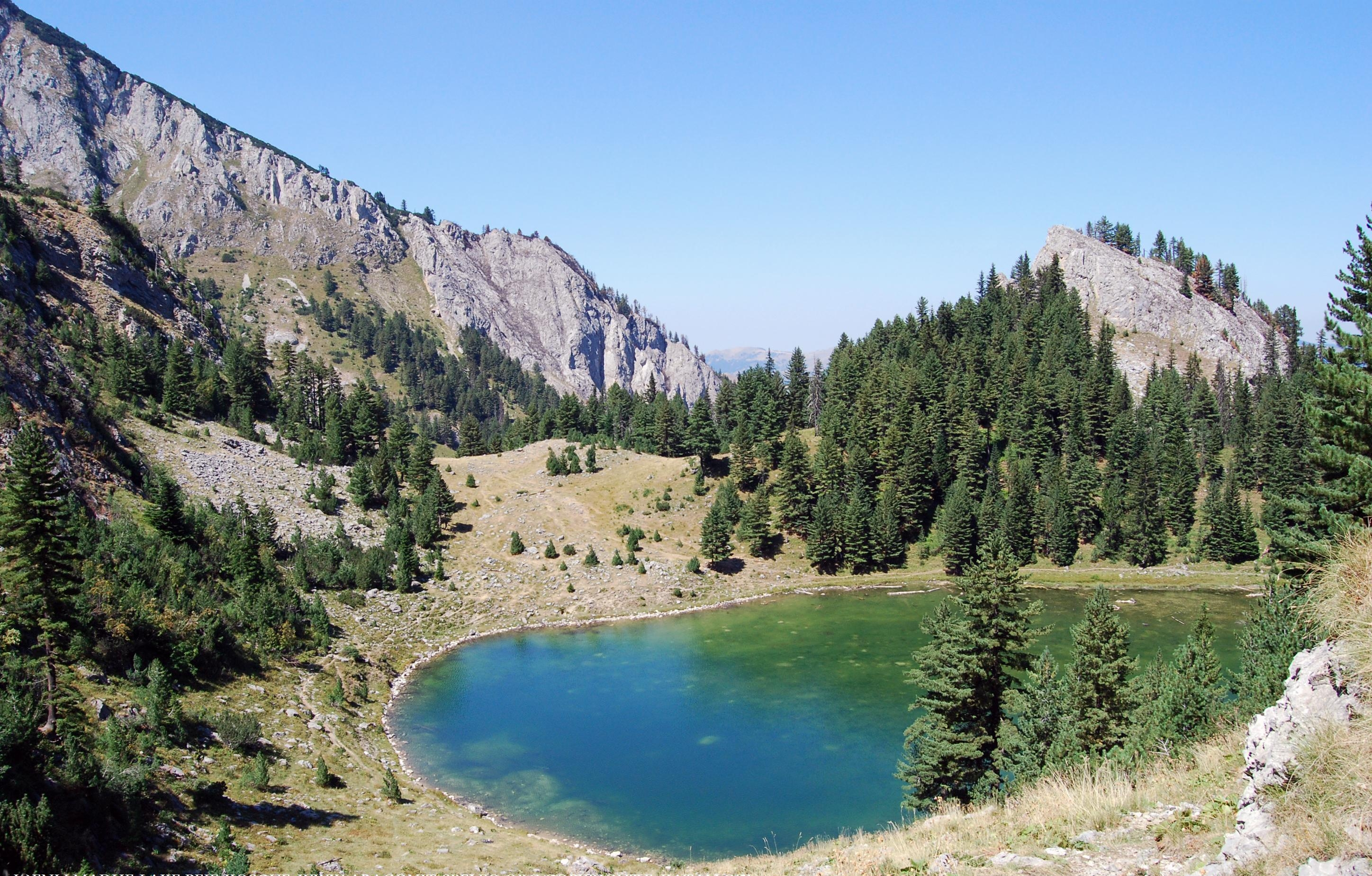
- Lake Leqinat
- Interactive map of Kuçishtë
- Location within Kosovo
- Location: Kosovo
- District: Pejë
- Municipality: Pejë
- Elevation: 1,204 m (3,950 ft)

Population (2024)
  - Total: 67

Kuçishtë (Albanian definite form: Kuçishta; Serbian: Кућиште, Kućište) is a small village located in the municipality of Peja, Kosovo. Kuçishtë is located near the Montenegro border, at the edge of the Rugova Canyon in the Accursed Mountains. The Lumbardhi i Pejës flows past the village. The peak of Leqinat at 1,799 meters above sea level is situated to the west of the village. The village of Kuçishtë is categorized as being the last village in the Rugova Canyon and for the rough terrain it's on.

The lake on Leqinat mountain bears the name of the village although the lake is also called Leqinat lake.
