= Little Liqenat Lake =

Lake in Kosovo

Little Lake Liqenat
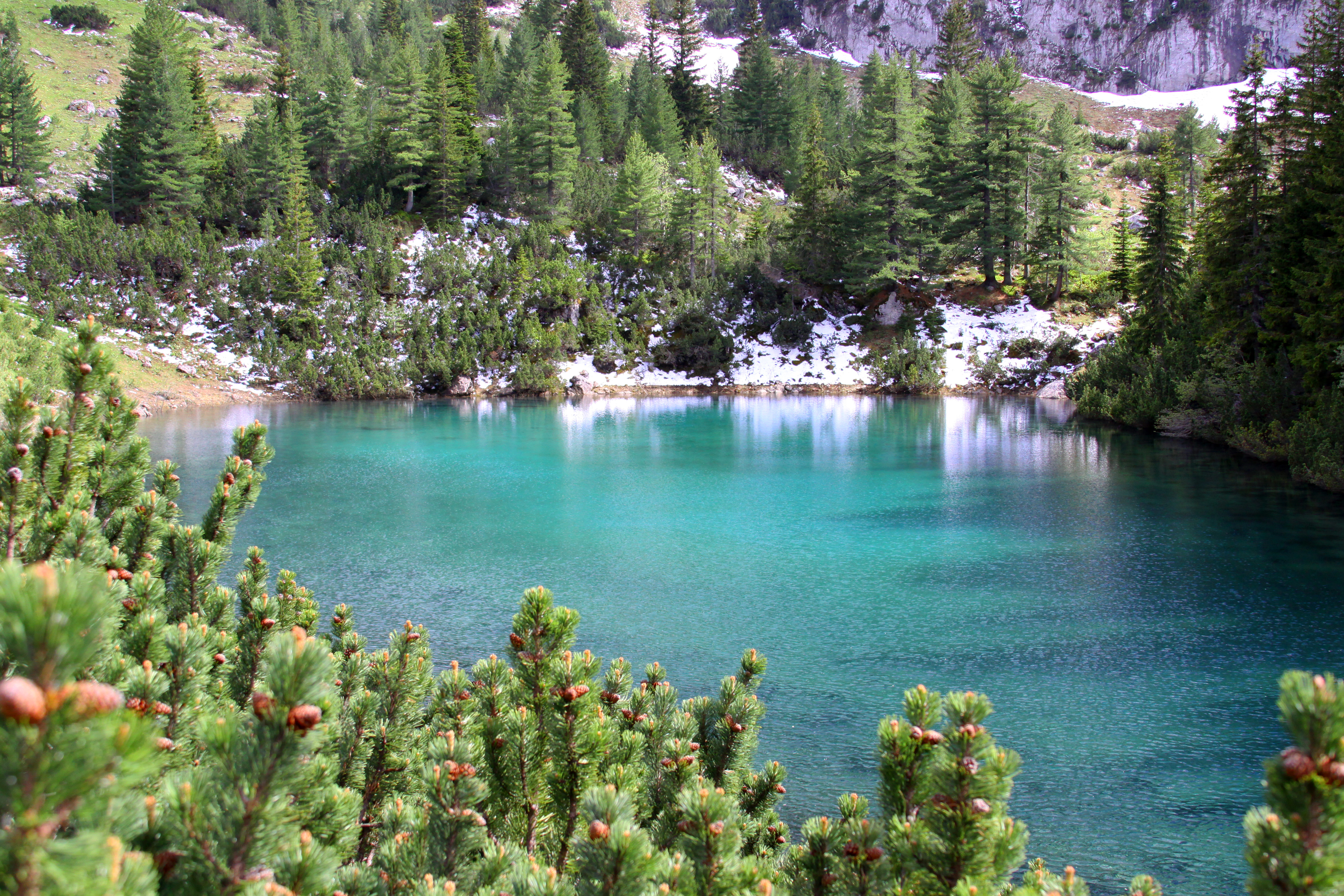
- Little Lake Liqenat

- Location within Kosovo Location within Europe
- Interactive map of Little Lake Liqenat
- Location: Accursed Mountains
- Coordinates: 42°40′02″N 20°05′57″E
- Basin countries: Kosovo
- Max. length: 100 m (328 ft)
- Max. width: 40 m (131 ft)

Little Lake Liqenat or Lake Drelaj (Albanian: Liqeni i Drelajve or Leqinati i vogël; Serbian: Језеро Мали Лићенат / Jezero Mali Lićenat) is a small lake found on Mount Leqinat that reaches an elevation of 2,341 m (7,680 ft) in the Accursed Mountains range in western Kosovo, near the border with Montenegro. The length of this lake is 100 m (328 ft) and the maximum width is 40 m (131 ft). Little Lake Liqenat is at a lower elevation than the much larger Lake Liqenat found in the west of it and only a hill of pine trees separates the two.

== See also ==
- List of lakes of Kosovo
