= Lake Liqenat =

Lake in Kosovo

- Lake Liqenat (Albanian)
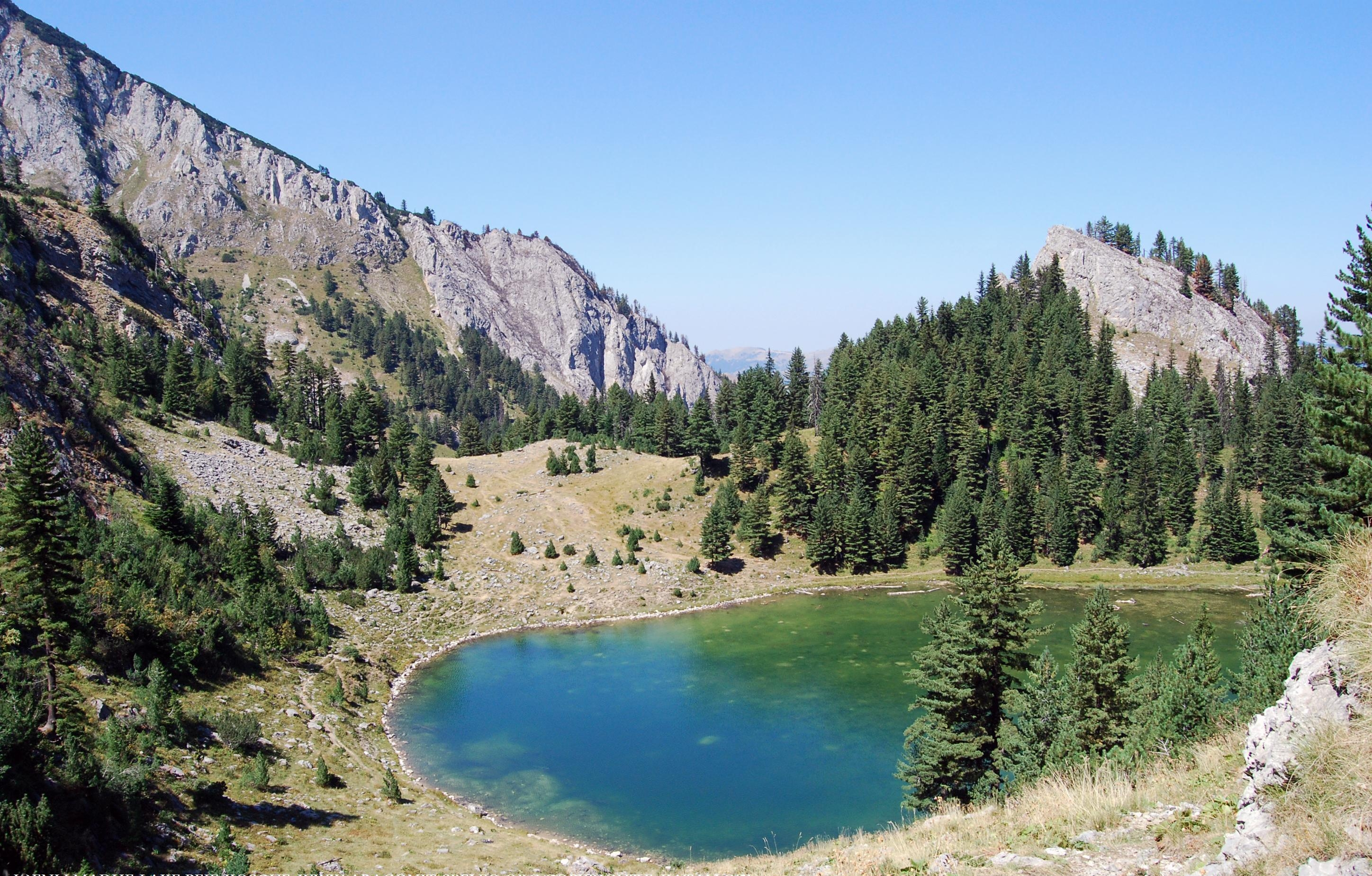
- Lake Liqenat

- Location within Kosovo Location within Europe
- Interactive map of Lake Liqenat
- Location: Mount Leqinat
- Coordinates: 42.6686°N 20.0908°E
- Basin countries: Kosovo
- Surface elevation: 1,970 m (6,463 ft)

Lake Leqinat or Lake Lićenat (Albanian: Liqeni i Leqinatit or Leqinati, or Liqeni i Kuqishtës; Serbian: Jezero Lićenat / Језеро Лићенат) is a mountain lake found on the Mount Leqinat in the Accursed Mountains in western Kosovo. This lake is well known throughout Kosovo and is visited by people going to the Rugova Canyon or by people climbing nearby peaks such as Leqinat 2,341 m (7,680 ft) and Guri i Kuq at 2,522 m (8,274 ft). Lake Leqinat is at an elevation of 1,970 m (6,463 ft). Lake Leqinat is just above the village of Kuqishtë.

== Geographic and physical characteristics ==
Lake Leqinat is located in the western part of Kosovo within Bjeshkët e Nemuna National Park (established in 2012), at an elevation of 1,860 metres above sea level. The lake is situated in a mountainous region of the Albanian Alps, also known as the Prokletije or Accursed Mountains. It is positioned just below the tree line in an alpine landscape characterised by dense deciduous and coniferous forests.

The lake has a surface area of 16,900 square metres and contains about 23,000 cubic metres of water. Lake Leqinat is a permanent body of water with a maximum depth of 4.5 metres in its southern basin. Its bathymetric profile shows a gradually sloping bottom that reaches this maximum depth in the southern portion of the lake.

Unlike its neighbouring water body, Lake Drelaj (located 0.7 kilometres to the east), which dries out during summer or autumn months, Lake Leqinat maintains its water level year-round. The lake shows weak stratification in summer, with distinct layers of water having different temperature, oxygen, and mineral content characteristics. This stratification is typical of alpine lakes with limited water circulation.

The shoreline is characterised by a mix of rocky and vegetated areas, with the surrounding landscape consisting of alpine terrain and forests typical of the Bjeshkët e Nemuna mountain range. The lake is accessible from the nearby village of Kuqishtë via hiking trails, making it a destination for visitors to the Rugova Canyon area.

== Biodiversity ==
Lake Leqinat hosts diverse aquatic life, representing an important ecosystem within the Bjeshkët e Nemuna National Park. The lake serves as a refuge for various species in this biodiversity hotspot of the Balkan Peninsula.

=== Flora ===
The phytoplankton community in Lake Leqinat is diverse and dominated by three main algal groups: chrysophycean (golden algae), cryptophycean, and chlorophycean algae. The chrysophycean genus Uroglena is particularly abundant, reaching its highest densities at around 2 metres depth and accounting for approximately 80.5% of the total algal biovolume. Cryptomonas marssonii, a cryptophycean species, represents about 9.5% of the biomass and is most concentrated in intermediate depth layers, while the chlorophycean Oocystis solitaria is more evenly distributed throughout the water column.

The lake features donsiderable diatom diversity, with 391 benthic and periphytic diatom species documented, including several rare and endangered species from Central and Eastern European flora. The recently discovered Neidiopsis borealis is also present in the lake.

Aquatic plant vegetation is well-developed, with large areas of the lake bottom covered by Chara contraria, extending down to the deepest parts. In shallower regions, Potamogeton alpinus (alpine pondweed) is present, while the shoreline is predominantly lined with Carex vesicaria (bladder sedge). This vegetation typically occurs in oligo- to mesotrophic alpine lakes.

=== Fauna ===
The zooplankton community of Lake Leqinat is characterised by relatively low diversity but stable populations. Five species of euplanktonic rotifers have been documented, with Anuraeopsis fissa and Polyarthra luminosa dominating the community, together constituting about 62.7% of the zooplankton biomass. The water flea Daphnia longispina is the only cladoceran species present in the lake, with its density increasing with depth. A more diverse rotifer fauna inhabits the benthic Chara mats, where researchers have identified 25 rotifer species in total.

Seven nematode taxa have been observed in the sediment and periphytic samples, with deposit feeder like Monhystera and Plectida being most abundant—these organisms play essential roles in the ecological functioning of the lake's food web.

Six adult trichopteran (caddisfly) species have been found at Lake Leqinat: Limnephilus centralis, L. flavospinosus, L. flavicornis, L. stigma, Agrypnia varia, and Oligotricha striata. Three of these species—L. flavospinosus, L. flavicornis, and O. striata—represent new records for Kosovo's fauna, with O. striata being particularly rare in the Balkan Peninsula.

The alpine newt (Ichthyosaura alpestris) is the only amphibian species recorded in Lake Leqinat and serves as the top predator in this ecosystem. A mark-recapture study estimated the population at nearly 4,000 adult individuals (roughly 1,500 females and 2,400 males), corresponding to a density of 0.24 individuals per square metre. All observed specimens were of the metamorphic phenotype, with males having a median snout-vent length of 42.2 mm and females 49.15 mm. The lake remains free of fish, which has allowed the preservation of its natural ecological balance and unique invertebrate communities that might otherwise be threatened by introduced predatory species.

== See also ==
- Little Liqenat Lake
- Bjeshkët e Nemuna National Park
- List of lakes of Kosovo
