= Leqinat =

Mountain in Kosovo and Montenegro

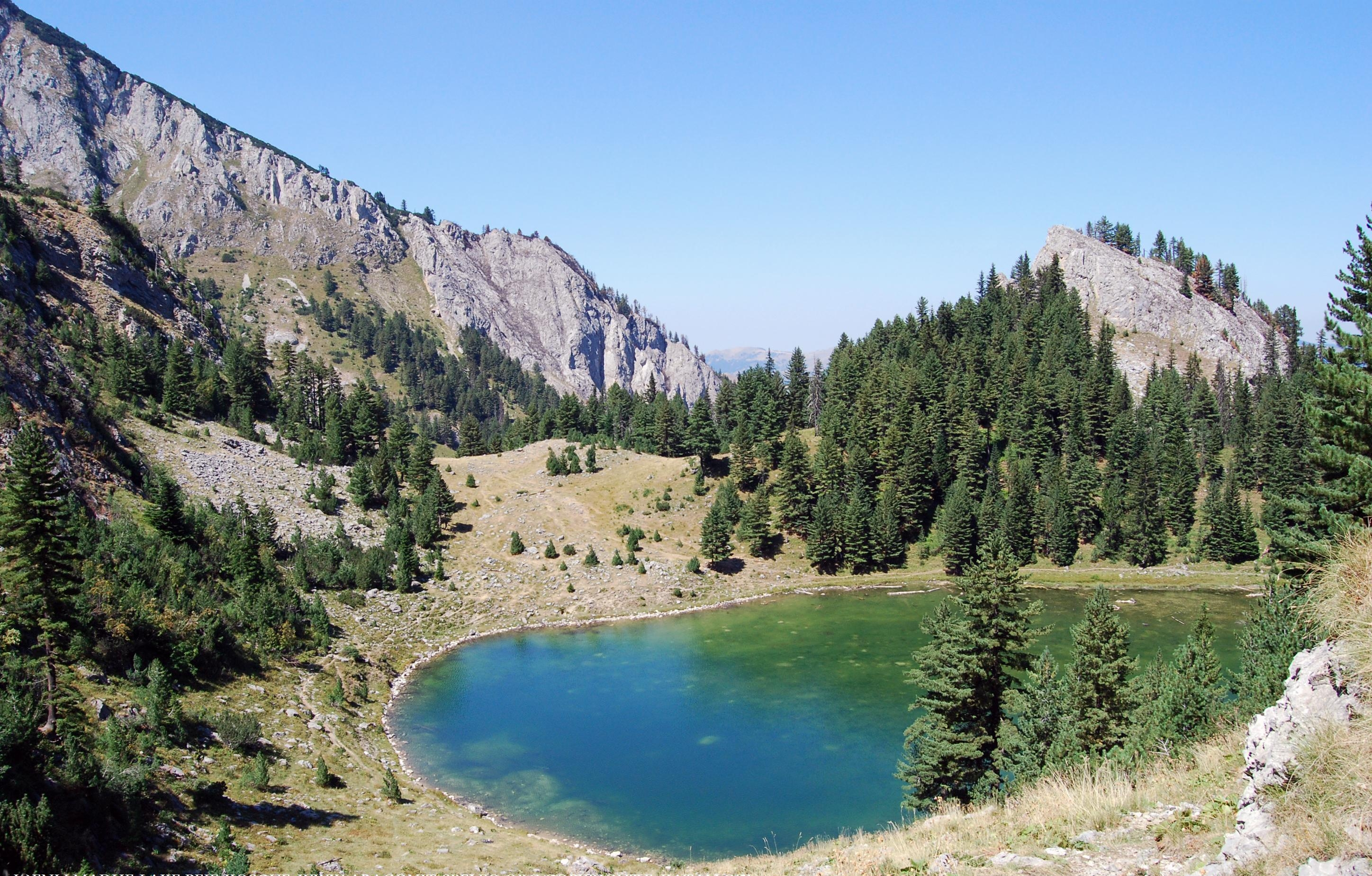
Lake Leqinat

Leqinat or Lićenat (Serbian and Montenegrin Cyrillic: Лићенат), is a mountain in western Kosovo and eastern Montenegro, in the Accursed Mountains range, with a top height of 2,341 m (7,680 ft).
