= Outline of Kosovo =

Overview of and topical guide to Kosovo

An enlargeable topographic map of Kosovo

The following outline is provided as an overview of and topical guide to Kosovo, a country in the Southeastern Europe.

== General reference ==
- Pronunciation:
- Common English name: Kosovo
- Official English names:

Republic of Kosovo (proclaimed republic's claim; de facto)
Autonomous Province of Kosovo and Metohija (Serbia's claim)
See International recognition of Kosovo and Brussels Agreement (2013)

- Common endonym(s): Kosova (Albanian and Turkish); Kosovo (Serbian and Bosnian)
- Official endonym(s):

Republika e Kosovës (Albanian)
Autonomna Pokrajina Kosovo i Metohija (Serbian)

- Adjectival: Kosovar or Kosovan
- Demonym: Kosovar/Kosovan
- Etymology: Name of Kosovo
- International rankings of Kosovo

== Geography of Kosovo ==
Geography of Kosovo

- Kosovo is: a landlocked territory
- Location:
  - Eastern Hemisphere
  - Northern Hemisphere
    - Eurasia
      - Europe
        - Southern Europe
          - Balkans (also known as "Southeastern Europe")
  - Time zone: Central European Time (UTC+01), Central European Summer Time (UTC+02)
  - Extreme points of Kosovo
    - High: Velika Rudoka 2,658 m (8,720 ft)
    - Low: White Drin 297 m (974 ft)
  - Land boundaries: 702 km

Serbia 352 km
North Macedonia 159 km
Albania 112 km
Montenegro 79 km

- Coastline: none

- Area of Kosovo: 10,908 km^{2}
- Atlas of Kosovo

=== Environment of Kosovo ===
- Climate of Kosovo
- Renewable energy in Kosovo
- Geology of Kosovo
- Protected areas of Kosovo
  - Biosphere reserves in Kosovo
- Wildlife of Kosovo
  - Fauna of Kosovo
    - Birds of Kosovo
    - Mammals of Kosovo

==== Natural geographic features of Kosovo ====
- Forests of Kosovo
- Lakes of Kosovo
- Mountains of Kosovo

=== Regions of Kosovo ===
Regions of Kosovo

==== Ecoregions of Kosovo ====
List of ecoregions in Kosovo

==== Administrative divisions of Kosovo ====
Administrative divisions of Kosovo

- Subdivisions of Kosovo
  - Municipalities of Kosovo

===== Subdivisions of Kosovo =====
Subdivisions of Kosovo

===== Municipalities of Kosovo =====
Municipalities of Kosovo

- Capital of Kosovo: Pristina
- Cities of Kosovo

=== Demography of Kosovo ===
Demographics of Kosovo

== Government and politics of Kosovo ==
- Form of government:
- Capital of Kosovo: Pristina
- Elections in Kosovo
- Kosovan elections
- 2008 Kosovo declaration of independence
  - 1990 Kosovo declaration of independence
  - International Court of Justice advisory opinion on Kosovo's declaration of independence
  - Serbia's reaction to the 2008 Kosovo declaration of independence
- Political parties in Kosovo
- Supreme Court of Kosovo

=== Branches of the government of Kosovo ===
Government of Kosovo

==== Executive branch of the government of Kosovo ====
- Head of state: President of Kosovo, Vjosa Osmani (acting)
- Head of government: Prime Minister of Kosovo, Avdullah Hoti (acting)
- Cabinet of Kosovo
- United Nations Interim Administration Mission in Kosovo

==== Legislative branch of the government of Kosovo ====
- Assembly of Kosovo (unicameral)

=== Foreign relations of Kosovo ===
Foreign relations of Kosovo

- Diplomatic missions in Kosovo
- Diplomatic missions of Kosovo
- International recognition of Kosovo
- Serbia's reaction to the 2008 Kosovo declaration of independence

==== International organization membership ====
International organization membership of Kosovo

Organisation	Application date	Admission date
Central European Free Trade Agreement (CEFTA)^{1}	6 April 2006	26 July 2007
Energy Community South East Europe Treaty (ECSEE)^{1}		1 July 2006
European Common Aviation Area (ECAA)^{1}		30 November 2006
Free Trade Agreement with Albania^{1}		2003
International Monetary Fund	10 July 2008	29 June 2009
World Bank	10 July 2008	29 June 2009
International Road and Transport Union		May 2009

^{1} Kosovo (UNMIK) membership
- Membership of Kosovo in international sports federations

=== Law and order in Kosovo ===
- Constitution of Kosovo
- Crime in Kosovo
- Human rights in Kosovo
  - LGBT rights in Kosovo
  - Sexual trafficking in Kosovo
  - Freedom of religion in Kosovo
- Law enforcement in Kosovo
  - European Union Rule of Law Mission in Kosovo
  - 2004 unrest in Kosovo
  - 2008 unrest in Kosovo

=== Military of Kosovo ===
Military of Kosovo

- Command
  - Commander-in-chief:
    - Ministry of Defence of Kosovo
- Kosovo Security Forces
  - NATO's Kosovo Force (KFOR)
  - Kosovo Protection Corps (KPC)
- Military history of Kosovo
- Military ranks of Kosovo

=== Local government in Kosovo ===
Subdivisions of Kosovo

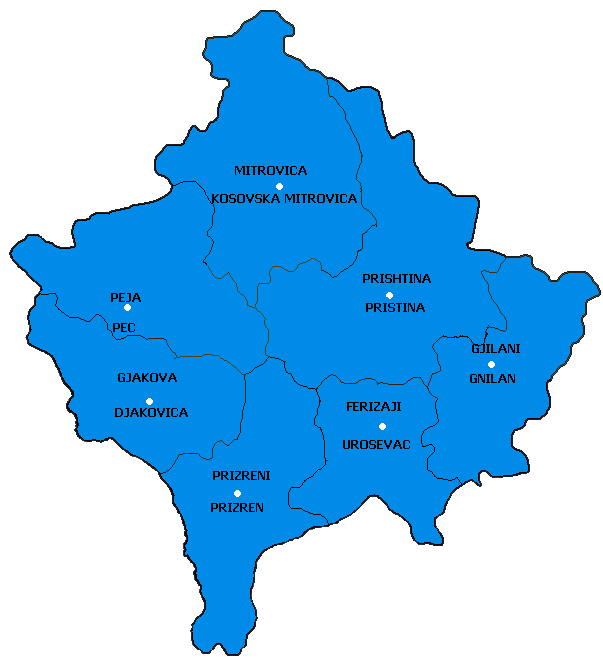
Districts of Kosovo

== History of Kosovo ==
History of Kosovo

- Military history of Kosovo

== Culture of Kosovo ==
Culture of Kosovo

- Architecture of Kosovo
- Cuisine of Kosovo
- Festivals in Kosovo
- Languages of Kosovo
- Literature of Kosovo
- Media in Kosovo
- Symbols of Kosovo
  - Coat of arms of Kosovo
  - Anthem of the Republic of Kosovo
  - Flag of Kosovo
- People of Kosovo
- Prostitution in Kosovo
- Public holidays in Kosovo
- Records of Kosovo
- Religion in Kosovo
  - Christianity in Kosovo
  - Hinduism in Kosovo
  - Islam in Kosovo
  - Judaism in Kosovo
  - Sikhism in Kosovo

=== Art in Kosovo ===
- Art in Kosovo
- Cinema of Kosovo
- Literature of Kosovo
- Music of Kosovo
- Radio in Kosovo
- Television in Kosovo
- Theatre in Kosovo

=== Sports in Kosovo ===
- Football in Kosovo
- Kosovo at the Olympics

== Economy and infrastructure of Kosovo ==
Economy of Kosovo

- Economic rank, by nominal GDP (2024): Between 143rd according to the IMF figures
- Communications in Kosovo
- Companies of Kosovo
- Currency of Kosovo: Euro (see also: Euro topics)
  - ISO 4217: EUR
- Tourism in Kosovo
- Transport in Kosovo
  - Airports in Kosovo
  - Rail transport in Kosovo

== See also ==
- List of international rankings
- Outline of Europe
- Outline of geography
