= Koznica (disambiguation) =

Koznica may refer to:

- Koznica, a mountain in Kosovo
- Koznica (Aleksandrovac), a village in Serbia
- Koznica, Vladičin Han, a village in Serbia

== See also ==
- Koznitsa (disambiguation)
