= Blinaja =

Hunting area of special importance in Kosovo

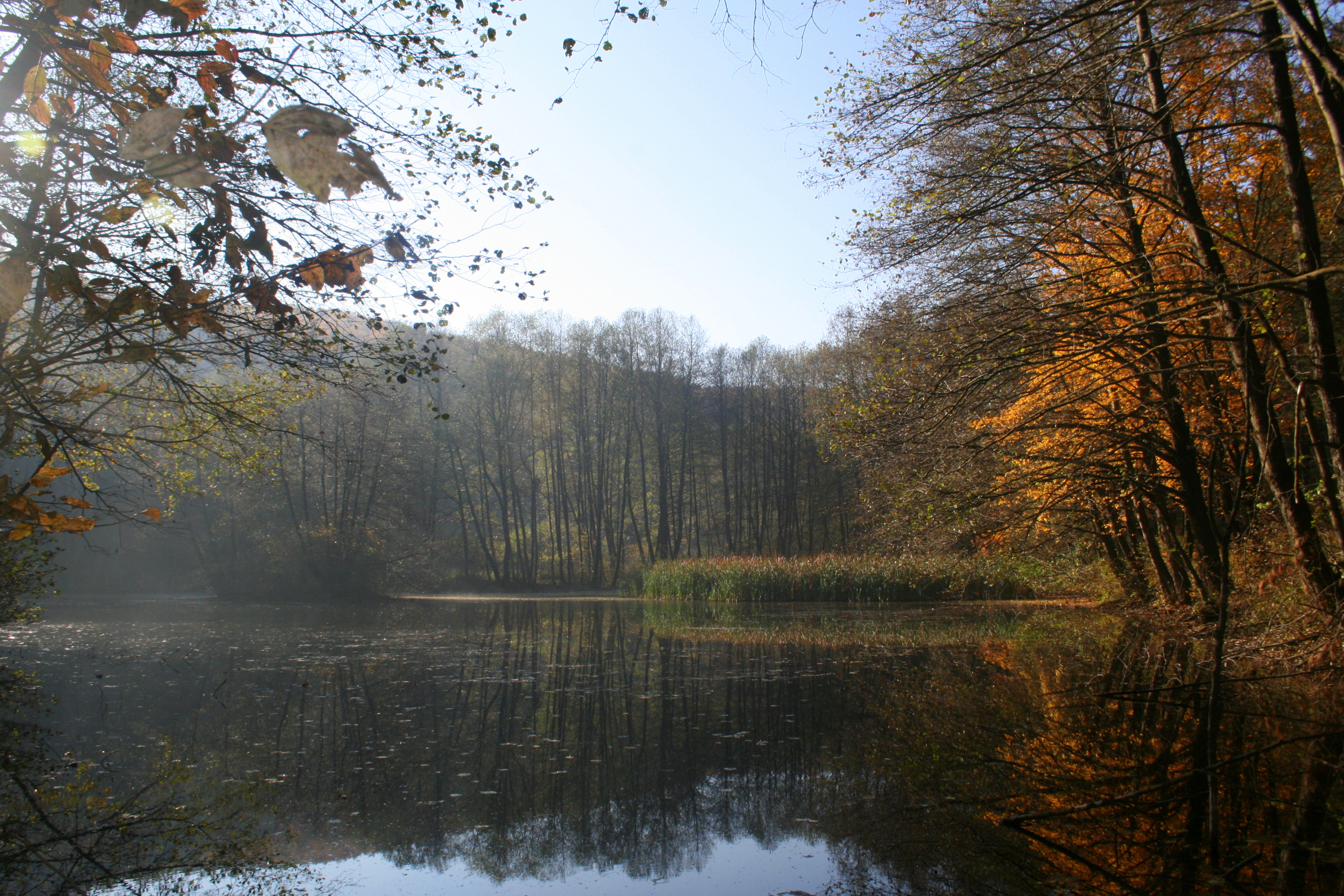

- Location within Kosovo
- Interactive map of Blinaja
- Location: Municipality of Lipjan, Kosovo
- Nearest city: Lipjan
- Coordinates: 42°31′03″N 20°58′48″E
- Area: 2,794 ha (6,900 acres)
- Max. elevation: 850 m (2,790 ft)
- Min. elevation: 600 m (2,000 ft)
- Established: 2009; 17 years ago

Blinaja (Albanian: Blinajë), also known as the Blinaja Hunting Area of Special Importance (Albanian: Vendgjuetia me Rëndësi të Veçantë "Blinaja"), is a hunting area of special importance in Kosovo. It was initially established in 1955 and later re-established in February 2009 with a total area of 2,794 hectares (6,900 acres). The protection of this park falls under the responsibility of the Kosovo Forestry Agency.

== Geography ==
Blinaja is situated in the western region of the lowland of Kosovo and is approximately 32 kilometres (20 mi) southwest of Pristina. The terrain elevates to heights ranging from 600 to 850 m (1,970 to 2,790 ft) above sea level, encompassing a hilly expanse dedicated to hunting grounds.

== Biodiversity ==
Within this hunting area, the living plant life showcases a multitude of indigenous species alongside a diverse wild fauna. The thriving vegetation is a product of historical evolutionary processes and favorable geographical, orographic, climatic, geological, and pedological conditions. The terrain is marked by a hill belt with moderate breaks and no distinct slopes. Hydrographically, there are small ravines that dry up completely in the summer. To ensure a consistent water supply, 30 water catchment dams have been built.

The majority of the forest cover, exceeding 90%, consists of coppice forests, while the remaining features include tall forests, meadows, pastures, water bodies, etc.

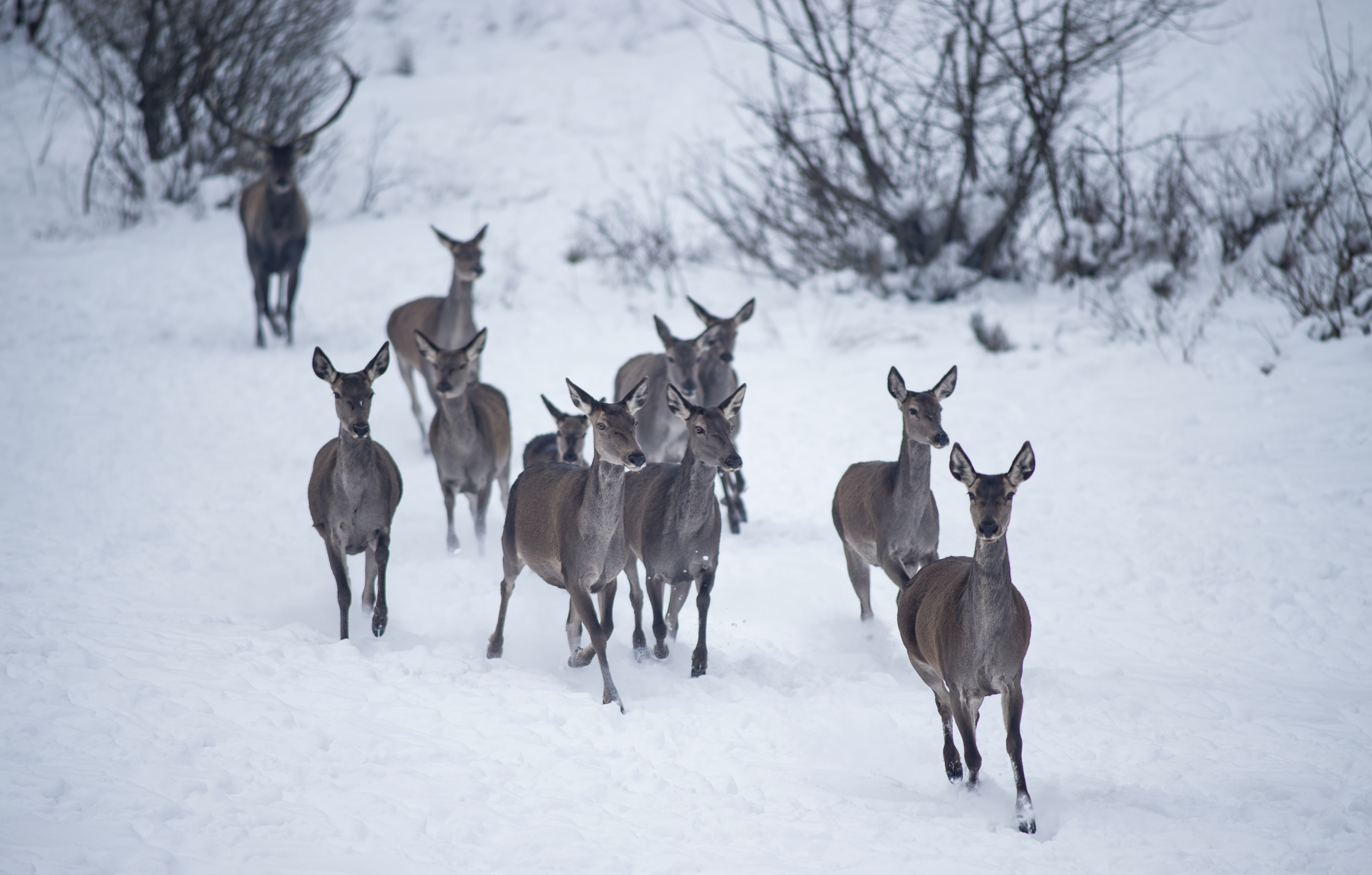
Deers in Blinaja during the winter

The most prevalent species cultivated in the Blinaja hunting area include roe deer, wild boar, fallow deer and red deer among others. In addition to these, the Blinaja hosts 82 carnivorous species found in Protected Areas of Nature, such as the wolf, fox, badger and the European wildcat, as well as birds like the imperial eagle, stone partridge and goshawk. Throughout the year and various seasons, the area also attracts numerous migratory birds that make intermittent stopovers.

Blinaja is a confined hunting ground, signifying restricted movement for both cultivated fauna and natural predators. The absence of predators emphasizes hunting as the primary method for regulating animal populations and sustaining biological balance. This approach prevents an excessive rise in animal numbers beyond the biological equilibrium, ensuring optimal conditions for food availability and the preservation of the ecosystem.

== See also ==
- Biodiversity of Kosovo
- Forests of Kosovo
