= Biodiversity of Kosovo =

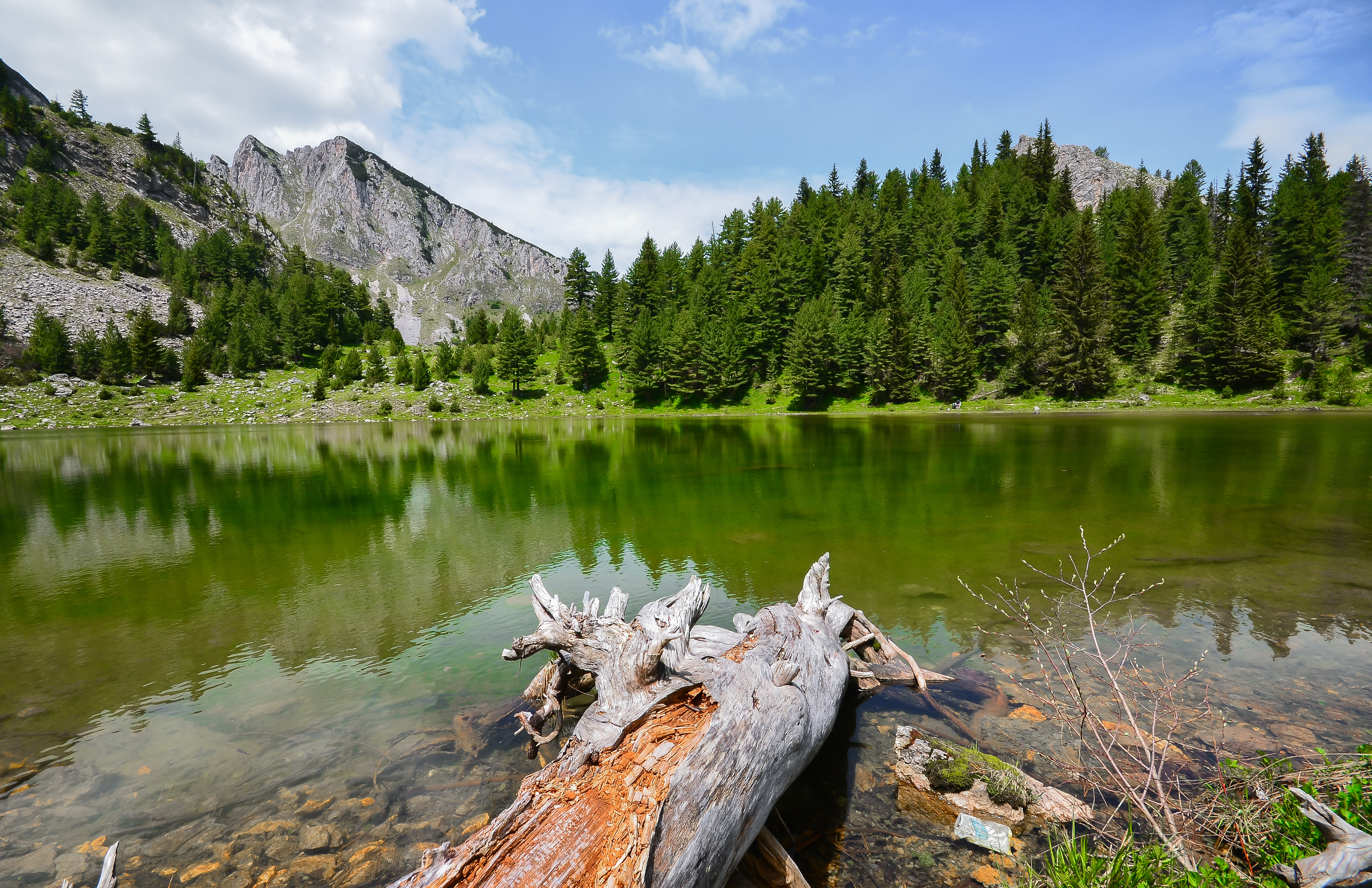
Bjeshkët e Nemuna National Park

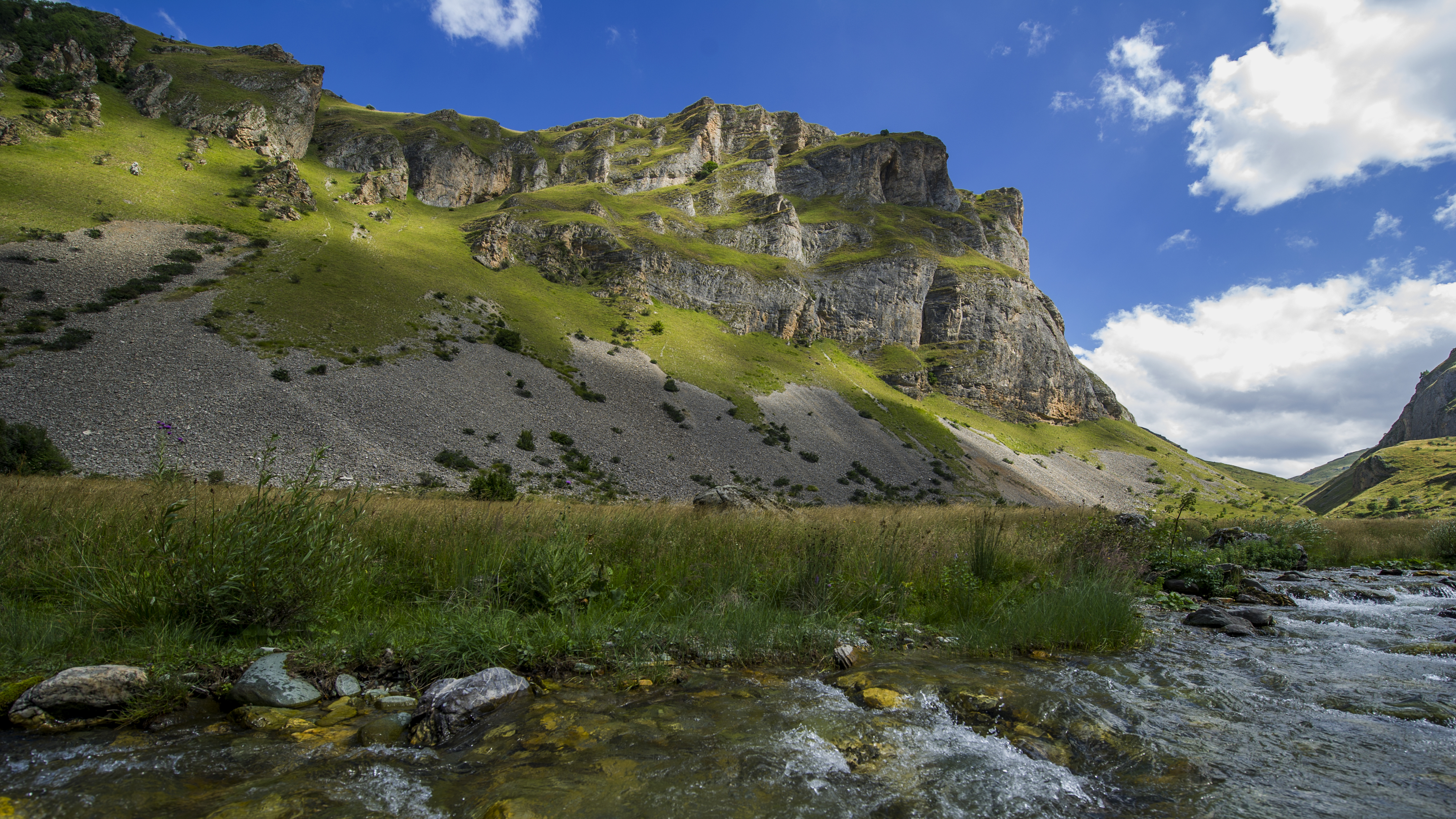
Sharr Mountains National Park

Kosovo is characterised by a diverse biodiversity and an abundance of different ecosystems and habitats determined by the climate along with the geology and hydrology. Predominantly mountainous, it is located at the center of the Balkan Peninsula bounded by Montenegro to the west, Serbia to the north and east, North Macedonia to the southeast, and Albania to the southwest.

Most of the country is geographically defined by the plains of Dukagjini and Kosovo. It is framed along its borders by the Albanian Alps in the west and the Sharr Mountains in the southeast, which are simultaneously, in terms of plant and animal species, the most important and diverse areas of the country.

The climate of the country is a combination of a continental and a Mediterranean climate, with four distinct seasons. It is mostly defined by its geographical location in Southeastern Europe and strongly influenced by the Adriatic, Aegean and Black Sea within the Mediterranean Sea.

In terms of phytogeography, the land area of Kosovo lies within the Boreal Kingdom, specifically within the Illyrian province of the Circumboreal Region. Its territory can be subdivided into two terrestrial ecoregions of the Palearctic realm, the Balkan and Dinaric mixed forests.

The forests are the most widespread terrestrial ecosystem in Kosovo and currently protected by particular laws of the Constitution of Kosovo. Most of the forests are important because they provide shelter and protection to hundreds of plant and animal species of national and international importance.

== Flora ==
The Kosovan forest flora is represented by 139 orders classified in 63 families, 35 genera and 20 species. It has a significance for the Balkans as whole – although Kosovo represents only 2.3% of the region's area, in terms of vegetation it represents 25% of flora and about 18% of total European flora. Due to the Mediterranean climate, several plants characteristic to sub-Mediterranean regions are found in forests, including terebinth (Pistacia terebinthus), wild asparagus (Asparagus acutifolius), fragrant virgin's bower (Clematis flammula) and the mallow bindweed (Convolvulus althaeoides).

The biodiversity of Kosovo is quite rich due to the exposure to the climate through the White Drin valley. The woodlands of Shar are habitat to 86 vascular plants of international significance, while the Accursed Mountains house 128 endemic species. The flora is represented by 139 orders classified in 63 families, 35 genera and 20 species. It has a significance for the entire region of Balkans, although Kosovo represents only 2.3% of the entire surface of Balkans, in terms of vegetation it represents 25% of the Balkans flora and about 18% of the European flora.

Other common flowers for the forests of Kosovo that are not exclusive to the Mediterranean climate include:

- European privet - Ligustrum vulgare
- Blue anemone - Anemone apennina
- Hop hornbeam - Ostrya carpinifolia
- Oriental hornbeam - Carpinus orientalis
- Turkish hazel - Corylus colurna
- European forsythia - Forsythia europaea

=== Endangered species ===
There are several flora species in the Kosovan forests that are considered to be endangered, as classified by the Kosovo Environmental Protection Agency:

- Poet's daffodil - Narcissus poeticus
- Didier's tulip - Tulipa gesneriana
- Globe-flower - Trollius europaeus
- Albanicum lily - Lilium albanicum
- Graeca lily - Fritillaria graeca
- Carnation - Dianthus scardicus
- Wulfenia - Wulfenia carinthiaca
- European yew - Taxus baccata
- Balkan maple - Acer heldreichii
- Macedonian oak - Quercus trojana
- Field elm - Ulmus minor

== Fauna ==
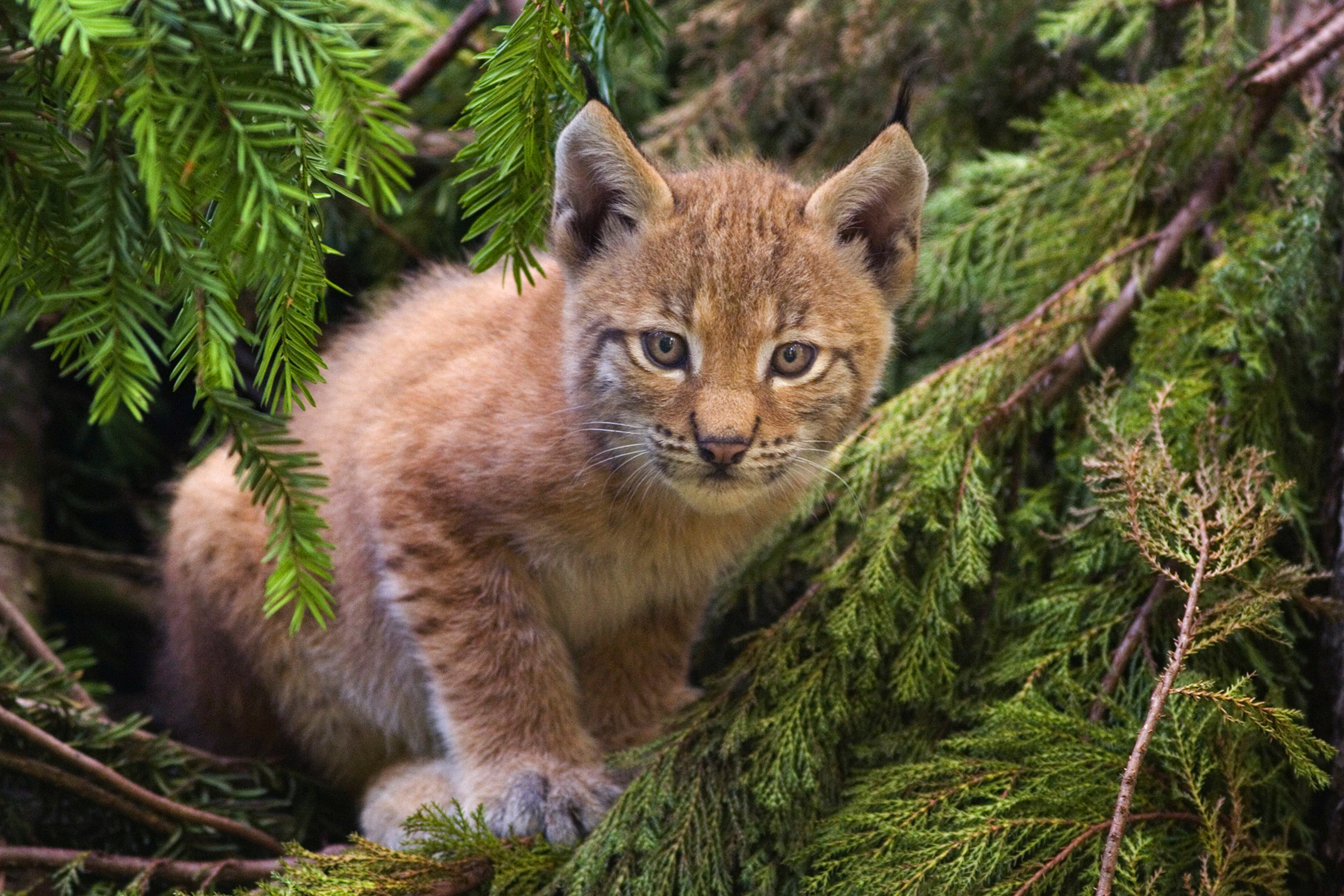
The Balkan lynx subspecies is found in Kosovo.

The fauna is influenced by the geographical position and conditions of the country, which suit several rare animals. The fields and hilly areas are home to boars, deer, rabbits, ravens, magpies, starlings, field sparrows, woodpeckers and turtle doves. In the mountainous regions there are field partridges, quails, pheasants, squirrels, storks, and many numerous species of eagles, vultures, hawks and others. The rare animals include the brown bear, wolves, roe deer, lynx, wild and forest hen grouse. Bears are mainly found in the Shar Mountains as well as in the Albanian Alps.

The high mountains in Kosovo make it ideal for many animals to live in. In the rivers and lakes there are salmon, trout, scuba, eel, gudgeon, catfish, carp, torpedo and small herring. The southern part, especially the Dragashi municipality has its own dog breed called the Qeni i Sharrit which is kept by the majority of people living in the country, Western part of North Macedonia and Albania.

The fauna of Kosovo is composed of a wide range of species due to its relief, ecological factors and geographic location. The forests with the greatest varieties are the ones located in the Shar Mountains, Accursed Mountains, Kopaonik and Mokna. There are a total of eleven natural reserves throughout Kosovo and they are home to species such as:

- Brown bear - Ursus arctos
- Eurasian lynx - Lynx lynx
- Chamois - Rupicapra rupicapra
- Golden eagle - Aquila chrysaetos
- Western capercaillie - Tetrao urogallus
- White stork - Ciconia ciconia
- Lesser kestrel - Falco naumanni
- Horned viper - Vipera ammodytes
- House mouse - Mus musculus
- Edible dormouse - Glis glis

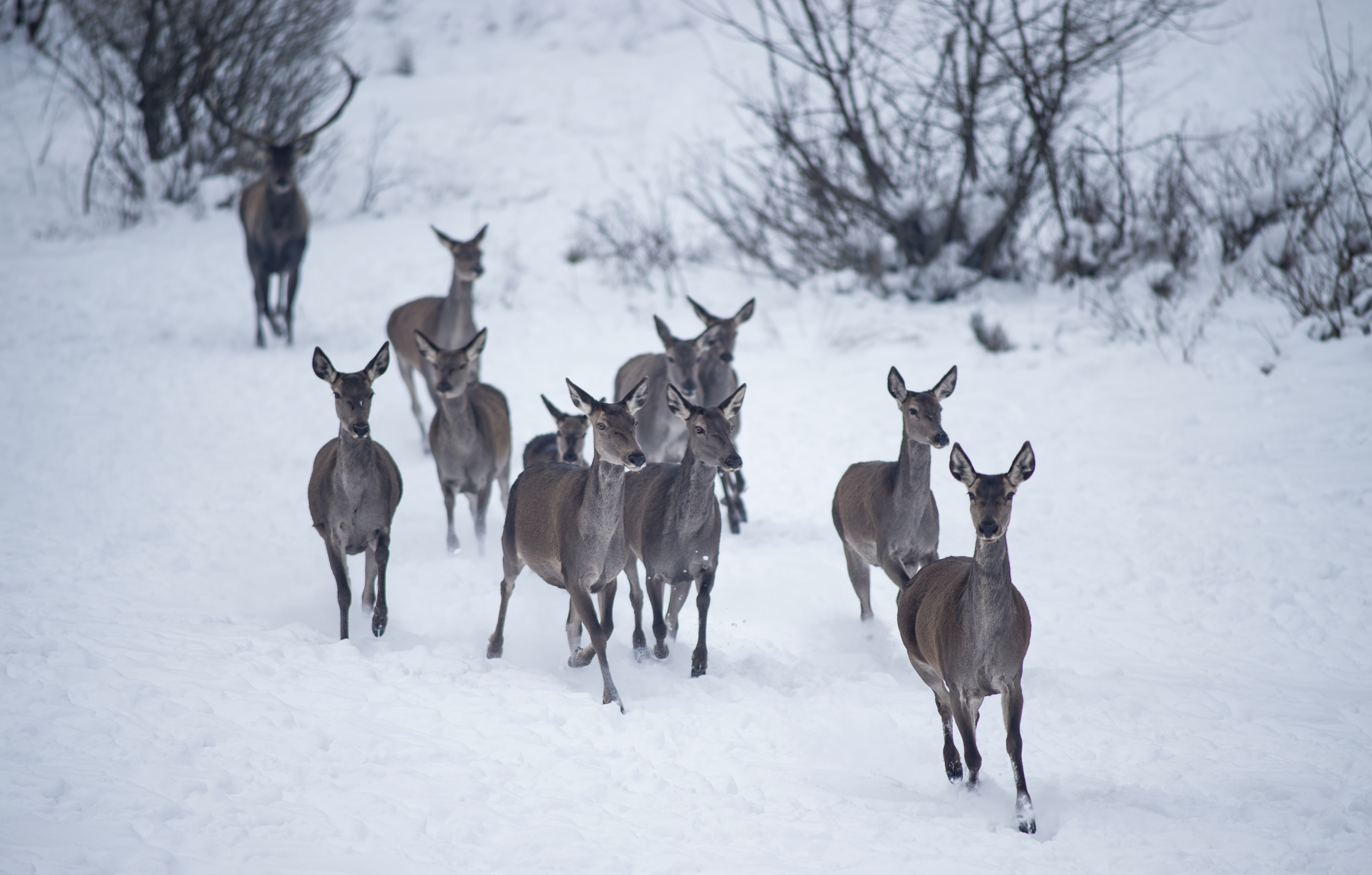
Deer in Blinaja during the winter

Blinaja and Duboçak are two hunting areas of special significance in Kosovo, established with the primary objective of preserving the region's diverse and precious fauna. These designated zones play a crucial role in safeguarding the wildlife of Kosovo.

== See also ==
- Geography of Kosovo
- Climate of Kosovo
- Forests of Kosovo
