= Forests of Kosovo =

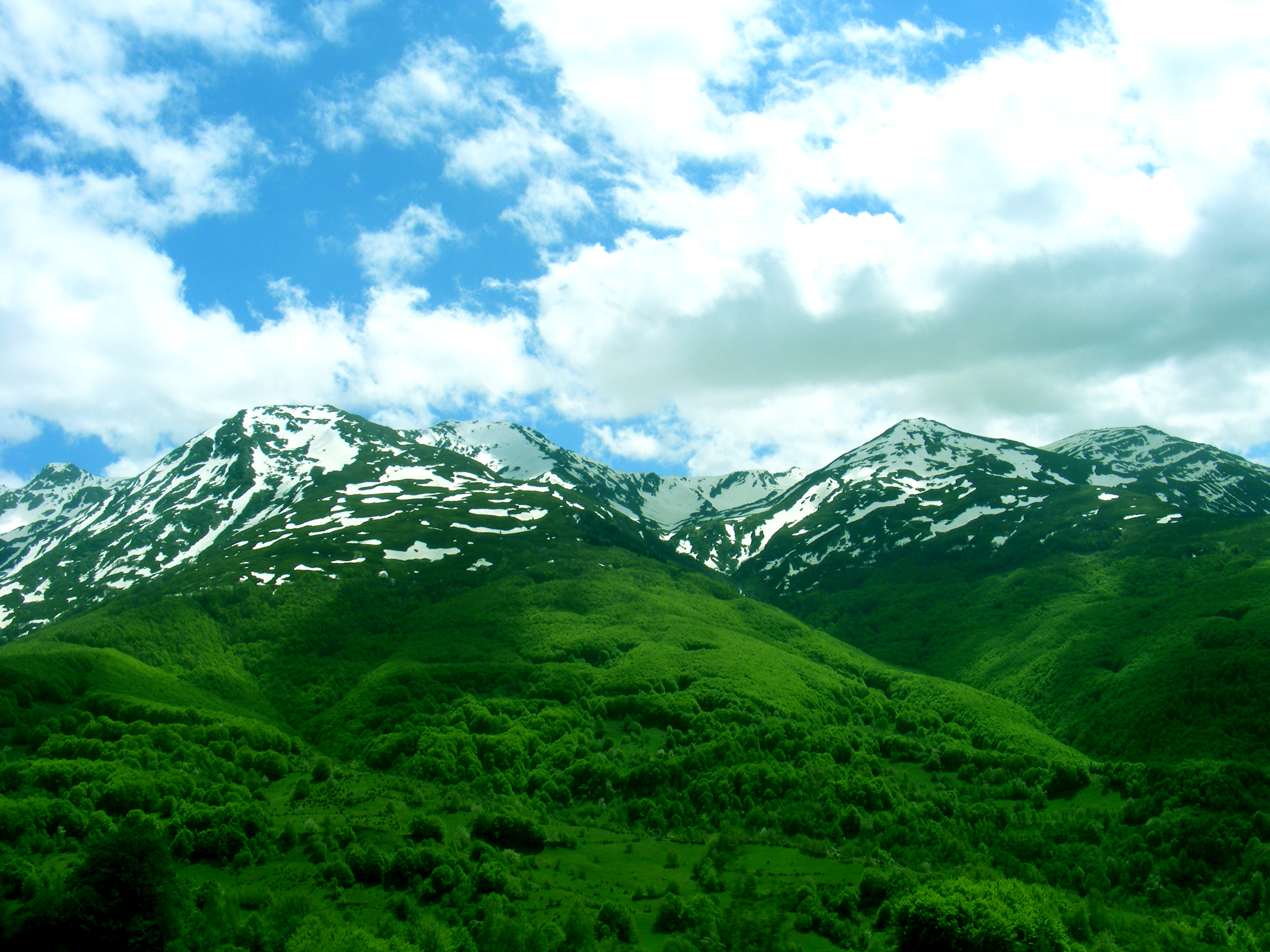
The forest of Sharr Mountains during springtime

The forests of Kosovo make up about 44.7% Agricultural land comprises 53% of Kosovo's total land area and forests 44.7% of the entire surface of the territory. Most of the forests are located in southwestern Kosovo, including the outskirts of Peja, Deçan, Istog, Junik and Gjakova and are protected by particular laws of the Kosovar Constitution. There are several types of forests in Kosovo and they are mostly represented by pinnate ones.

All of the forests of Kosovo have a wide-ranging flora and fauna that is of a major importance to the entire region of Balkans. The Kosovar flora represents about 25% of the Balkans flora and 18% of the European one, while the most essential regions with assorted biodiversity are the Sharr Mountains and the Accursed Mountains. Still, the Kosovar woodlands are prone to being damaged by seasonal fires and illegal logging.

== Overview ==
The Kosovar forests have a national significance and are currently protected by over ten laws. Their area is estimated to be as much as 464,800 hectares (1,148,556 acres), of which 278,880 hectares (689,127 acres) are public property managed by Kosova Forestry Agency and 185,920 hectares (459,418 acres) are privately controlled.

The forests affect the climate of Kosovo and serve as protection measures against land erosion. Many of the woodlands have been transformed into natural resorts for their therapeutic capabilities. Estimations show that the total volume of forest wood is about 40 million m^{3}, with about 90 m^{3} of wood per hectare. Kosovar forests are home to both pinnate and conifer forests, as well as other ones.

=== Types of forests ===
The following table shows a classification of forests according to Kosovo Forestry Agency:

Forest type	Area in hectares	Distribution in %
High forests	66,000	15%
Low forests	179,000	42%
Degraded forests	82,000	20%
Shrubs and bushes	103,000	23%

About half of all Kosovar forests fall under the 0 to 20 years seniority class, while the rest of the percentage is almost equally split between the 20 to 40 years, 40 to 60 years and 60 to 80 years categories. Over two-thirds of the public and private forests are woods with diameter greater than 7 centimetres (2,75 inches), which are typically thicker and of greater potential.

==== Forests by wood type ====
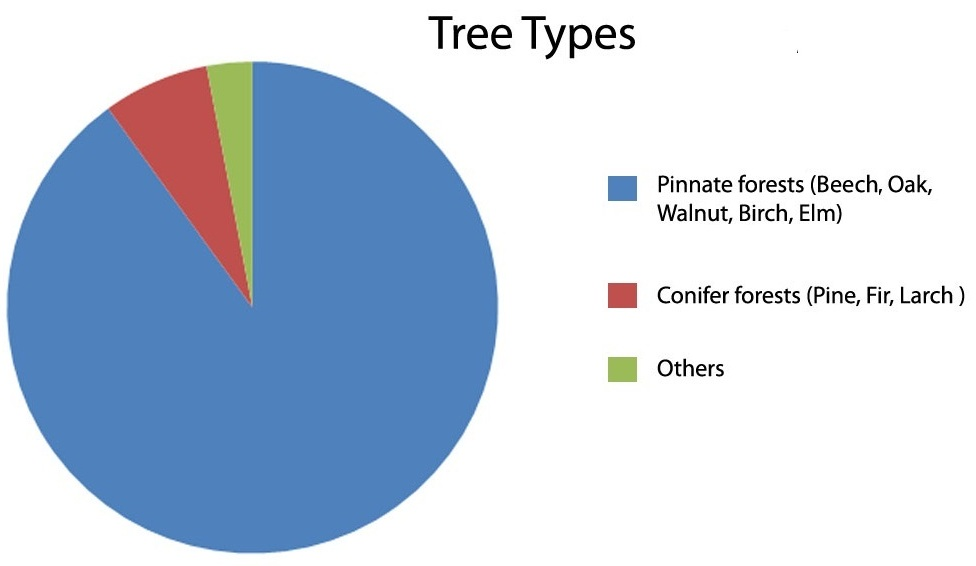
Pie chart showing most common wood types in Kosovar forests.

Some of the most common types of forests in Kosovo include the following:

- European beech (Fagus sylvatica)
- Sessile oak (Quercus petraea)
- Italian (Hungarian) oak (Quercus frainetto)
- Silver fir (Abies alba)
- Norway spruce (Picea abies)
- Bosnian pine (Pinus heldreichii)
- Macedonian pine (Pinus peuce)
- Goat willow (Salix caprea)
- Common hazel (Corylus avellana)

=== Annual growth and decline ===
Almost half of Kosovo's entire territory is a forested area, thus leading to a satisfying extent of annual forest growth. The 40 million m^{3} of wood is annually increased by about 1.3 million m^{3}, or about 3 m^{3} per hectare. On the other hand, the annual national demand for wood is believed to be approximately 1 million m^{3}. This enormous demand is due to firewood being the most common heating source throughout the entire country. The Kosovar forest are thus enlarged by 300,000 m^{3} of wood each year, whereas the global forests are in decline.

=== Protected areas ===
Around 4.39% of Kosovo's territory are law protected parks. There are a total of 97 protected areas, which consist of natural reserves, regional parks, natural monuments and national parks. The largest protected area is the complex of Sharr Mountains with a total surface of 60,000 hectares (148,300 acres) and there have been plans to declare the Albanian Alps as a national park.

=== Inhabited forests ===
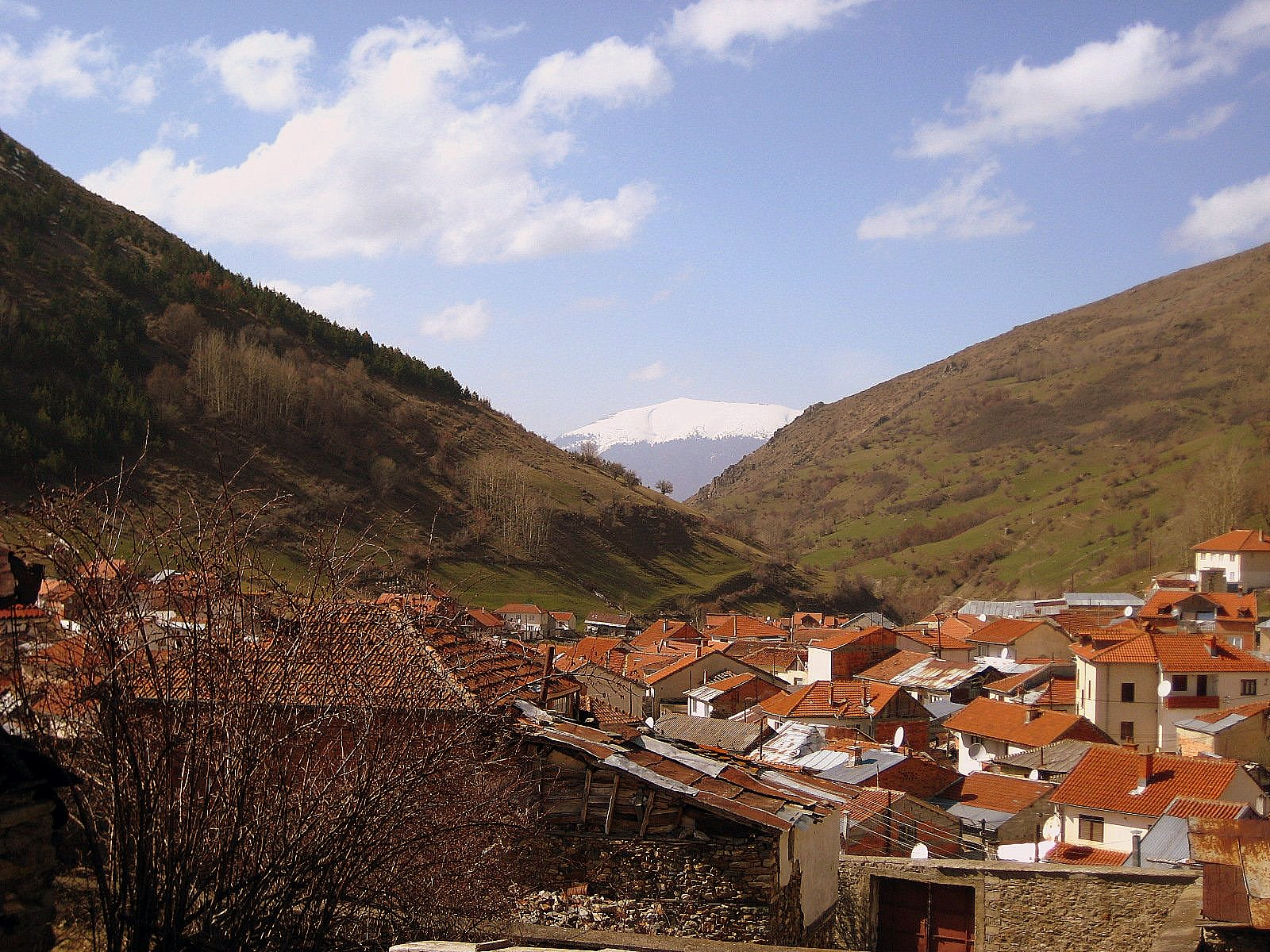
Village of Brod, Dragash

There are some settlements in the forests of Kosovo, the most noteworthy ones being located in southwestern Kosovo, more precisely in the Šar Mountains and Accursed Mountains. Municipalities such as Štrpce, Junik and Dragash are located close to forested areas, therefore there are several smaller surrounding localities that entirely lie on forests. Additionally, there are many other villages and townships in other parts of Kosovo that are partly located in the woods. This, however, is changing due to the high rate of urbanization and deforestation for agricultural purposes. The municipality of Leposavić is also located close to the woodlands of Kopaonik, thus the surrounding villages can serve as yet other examples of inhabited Kosovar forests.

=== Forest related issues ===
==== Legislation ====
The main law regarding the conservation of forests was approved in 2003 by the then provisional Assembly of Kosovo. The Constitution of the Republic of Kosovo also foresees that the Kosovar forests are to be protected in accordance with previously approved laws, including the law on forests. Numerous other laws have since been approved, including the law on environmental protection and the law on spatial planning, but their application remains limited. Illegal use of forests by individuals is the main issue that the environmental regulation agencies currently face. Besides for damaging the woodlands, this activity poses serious risks to the endangered species of flora and fauna that populate the areas subject to illegal felling.

==== Evaluation of forested areas ====
The last assessment and evaluation of the territories covered by forests within the borders of Kosovo took place during 2012. Nonetheless, only 92,756 hectares (229,205 acres) or 20% of all Kosovar forests were taken into account. A previous evaluation which was completed in 2002 also compiled data for the same area, leaving 80% of forested area outside variable calculations. This lack of data causes inconveniences for spatial planning in the first place; creating stable strategies for fighting illegal use of trees is also very difficult due to the lack of information on woodlands. Furthermore, fires that tend to take place during the hot summer months cannot be properly traced if only one-fifth of the entire forests are covered by estimation reports. The next evaluation is set to take place ten years after the last assessment and it will possibly cover a larger territory.

==== Renewable energy from biomass ====
There are current attempts by the Kosovar authorities for switching to renewable energy and the reduction of firewood usage is part of the strategy. It is planned to upgrade to energy production from biomass, mainly forest wood, since this would decrease the emission of carbon dioxide and other potentially poisonous gases. This upgrade is presently supported by the EU and the government of Kosovo, which in 2011 jointly funded a project with respective amounts of 2.7 million euros and 300 thousand euros to help improve forestry management policies and introduce European standards for stable management.

== List of forests ==
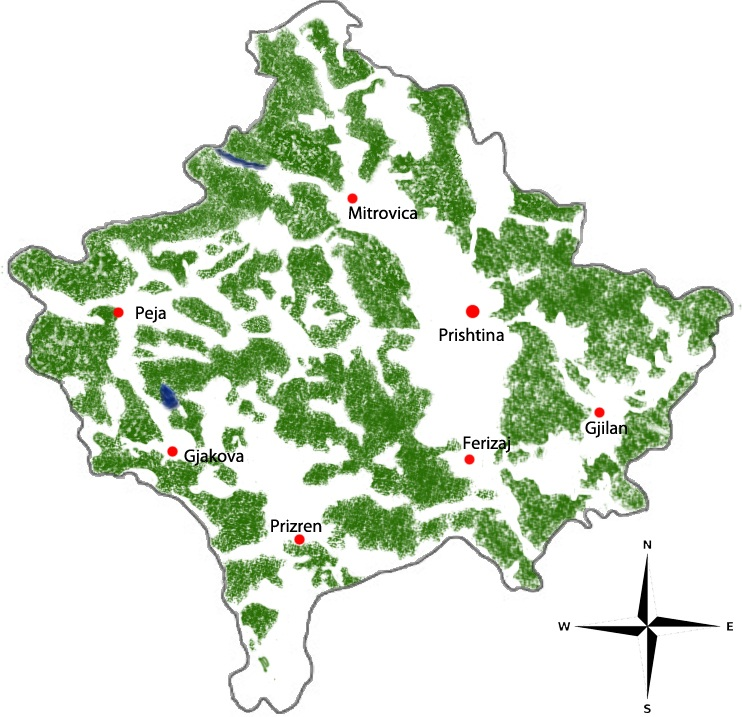
Map showing forest distribution in Kosovo.

The following table shows the most important forests of Kosovo and their location:

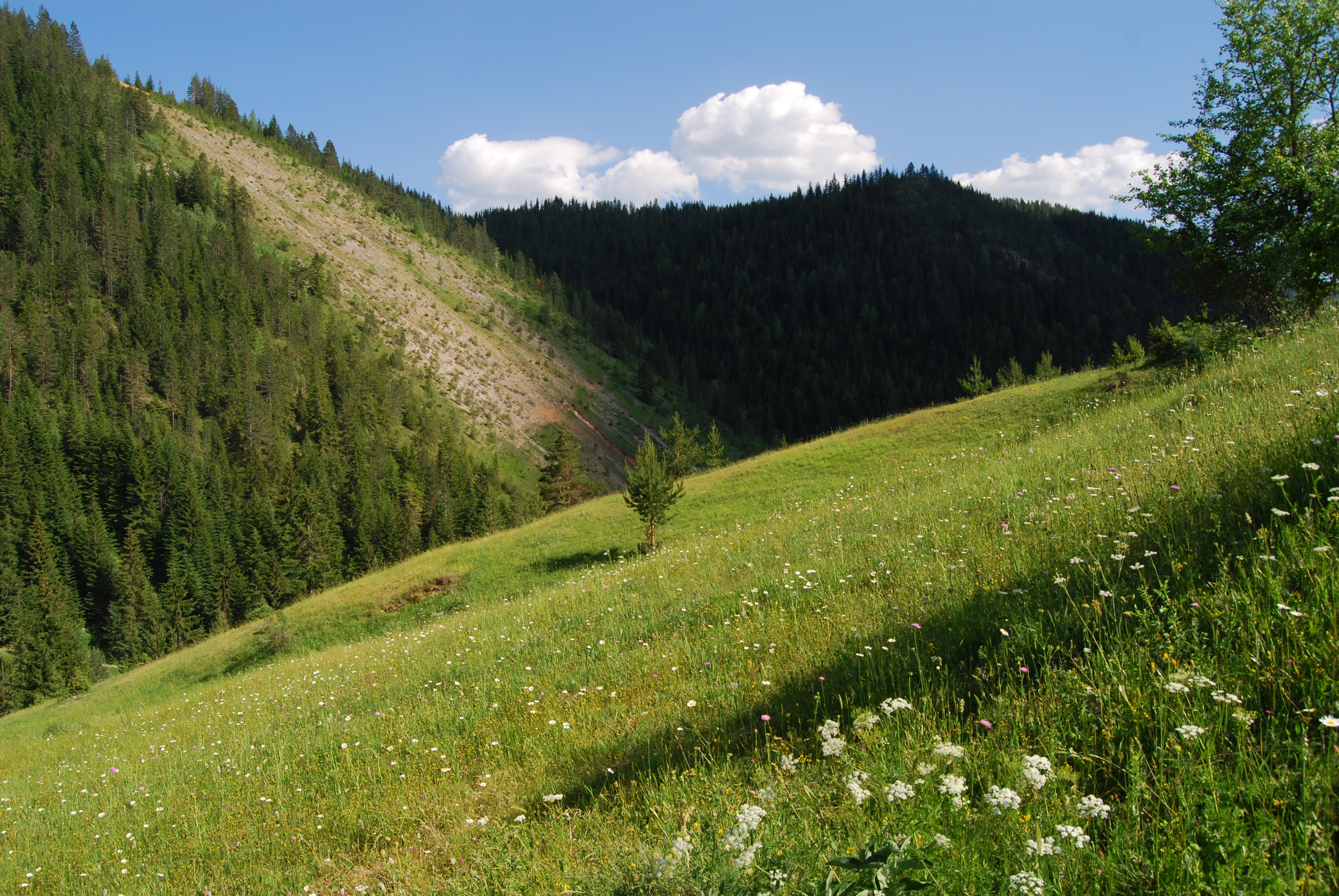
Rugova Alps with the forests on the distance.

Name of forests (in English)	District	Coordinates
Šar	Prizren	42.151°N 20.912°E
Accursed Mountains	Pejë	42.740°N 20.362°E
Pristina	Prishtina	42.676°N 21.215°E
Pashtrik	Prizren	42.219°N 20.523°E
Mokna	Mitrovica	42.857°N 20.536°E
Koritnik	Pejë	42.083°N 20.567°E
Jezerce	Ferizaj	42.367°N 21.030°E
Nerodimlje	Ferizaj	42.333°N 21.069°E
Žitinje	Ferizaj	42.232°N 21.294°E
Opoja	Prizren	42.126°N 20.679°E
Hajla	Peja	42.545°N 20.208°E
Prugovac	Prishtina	42.751°N 21.208°E
Koznica	Prishtina	42.640°N 21.371°E
Žegovac	Ferizaj	42.447°N 21.279°E
Ranilug	Prishtina	42.489°N 21.611°E
Gušica	Gjilan	42.286°N 21.299°E
Slakovce	Mitrovica	42.874°N 21.055°E
Dubočak	Mitrovica	42.845°N 20.730°E

== Biodiversity ==
The flora and fauna of the Kosovar forests is quite rich due to the exposure to Mediterranean climate through the White Drin river. In that context, the Šar Mountains and the Accursed Mountains are the two most important areas for the biodiversity of Kosovo. The woodlands of Šar are the habitat to 86 vascular plants of international significance, while the Albanian Alps house 128 endemic species.

== Activities ==
Kosovo Forestry Agency, part of the Ministry of Agriculture, Forestry and Rural Development in the government of Kosovo is the institution responsible for managing the forests of Kosovo and dealing with any associated issue. Its status is granted by the law on forests and the agency is composed of several smaller divisions that deal with forestry management.

Of Kosovo's total volume of 40 million m^{3} of forest woods, about 1 million m^{3} is annually used for heating purposes. There is a major potential for using or exporting timber, yet merely a few trees are cut for industrial purposes. Only about 70,000 to 80,000 m^{3} of timber were industrially utilized during the past decade, while there is enough wood supply to meet twice that amount.

=== Fires ===
The forests of Kosovo tend to be subject to fires during summertime. During the past decade, the largest fires have been recorded in the summer of 2007 when about 5,000 hectares (12,350 acres) of lands were damaged by fires caused by natural and the human factor. This situation has repeated itself during the following summers, but there have been preparations to prevent potential forest fires in 2013. Additionally, forest fires are exceptionally dangerous for the reason that they can trigger series of other natural disasters, including landslides. Although there have been several attempts to prevent such disasters, the risk of them taking place has not ceased to exist. Moreover, as a result of these fires, the flora and fauna is constantly at risk.

=== Illegal use ===
About 40% of publicly managed forests and 29% of privately owned forests of Kosovo are subject to illegal use. The forests of Šar are the largest target of this phenomenon; only during 2008, around 1,800 m^{3} of forest wood were damaged by illegal felling. This has caused considerable financial damage amounting to about half a million euros solely on this region. There has been a total of 7,600 lawsuits during 2010 for forestry illegal use related issues, of which very few have so far been reviewed and settled. On the other hand, illegal use of forests poses serious environmental threats. As a result of such activity, large forested areas have been transformed into lands for agricultural purposes throughout the entire country, especially on the region of Prizren.

Several governmental projects have been organized in order to prevent illegal use of forests and to identify the territories that are the largest victims of this activity. A recent joint project of the EU and the government of Kosovo has fighting illegal logging of woodlands as its main priority and it is expected to yield satisfying results.

=== Places of interest ===
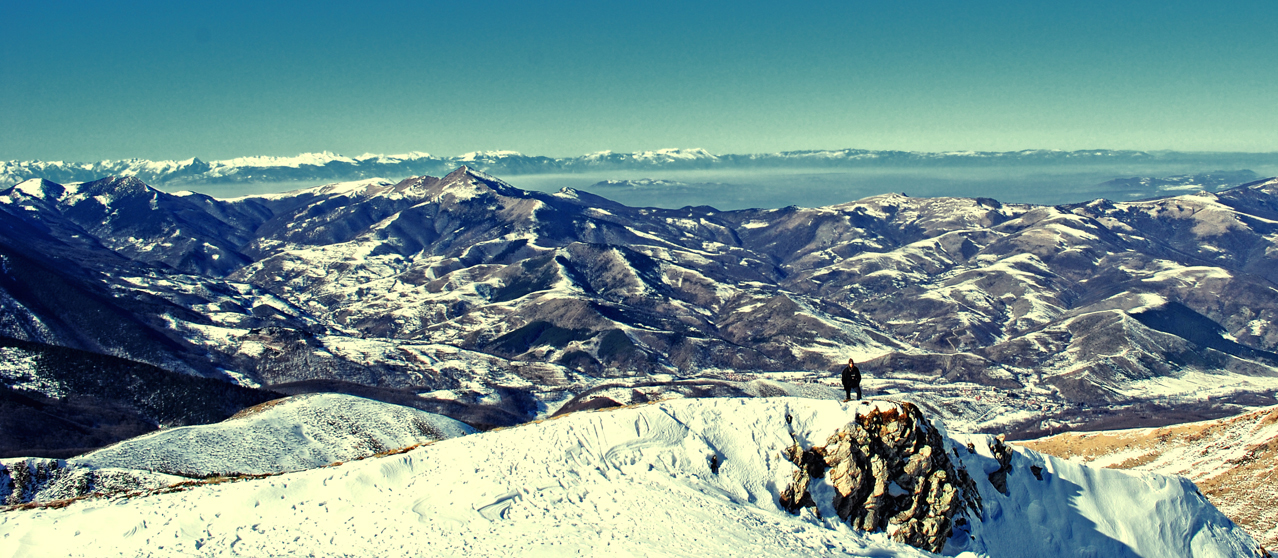
Brezovica mountains

Gërmia is a regional park located in the northeast of Pristina, the capital city of Kosovo, and has a total surface of 6,200 hectares (15,320 acres). It offers several hiking trails along with leisure facilities, as well as few ski slopes.

Brezovica is a popular ski resort during wintertime for the locals because of its convenient location in the Šar mountains. It is elevated at a height of 900 to 2,500 meters above sea level. Brezovica offers a variety of winter sports as well as hiking during the warmer seasons.

Bogë is situated in western Kosovo, more precisely in the Accursed Mountains. It is popular during both summer and winter for similar activities to those offered in Brezovica.

Prevalla is located at a height of 1,515 meters above sea level in the Šar mountains. The park offers terrains for skiing, hiking and relaxation. The river of Lepenac flows close to Prevalla.

== See also ==
- Geography of Kosovo
- Šar Mountains
- Accursed Mountains
- List of mountains in Kosovo
- Fauna of Kosovo
- Tourism in Kosovo
- Brezovica

== Bibliography ==
- Warrander, Gail, and Verena Knaus. "Natural History and Conservation Areas." Kosovo. 2nd ed. UK: Bradt Travel Guides Ltd2, 2010. 04-06. Print. Bradt Travel Guides.
- Qenan Maxhuni et al. "Parku Kombëtar "Mali Sharr"" Gjendja e Natyrës, Raport 2008-2009. Pristina: Ministria e Mjedisit Dhe Planifikimit Hapësinor, Agjencia e Mbrojtes Së Mjedisit Të Kosovës, 2010. 16. Print.
- Radford, Elizabeth A., and Baudewijn Odé. Conserving Important Plant Areas: Investing in the Green Gold of South East Europe. Salisbury: Plantlife International, 2009. Print.
- Ismajli, Rexhep, and Mehmet Kraja. Kosova: Vështrim Monografik. Pristina: Akademia E Shkencave Dhe E Arteve E Kosovës, 2011. Print.
