= Geology of Kosovo =

The geology of Kosovo includes a variety of different tectonic and stratigraphic features.

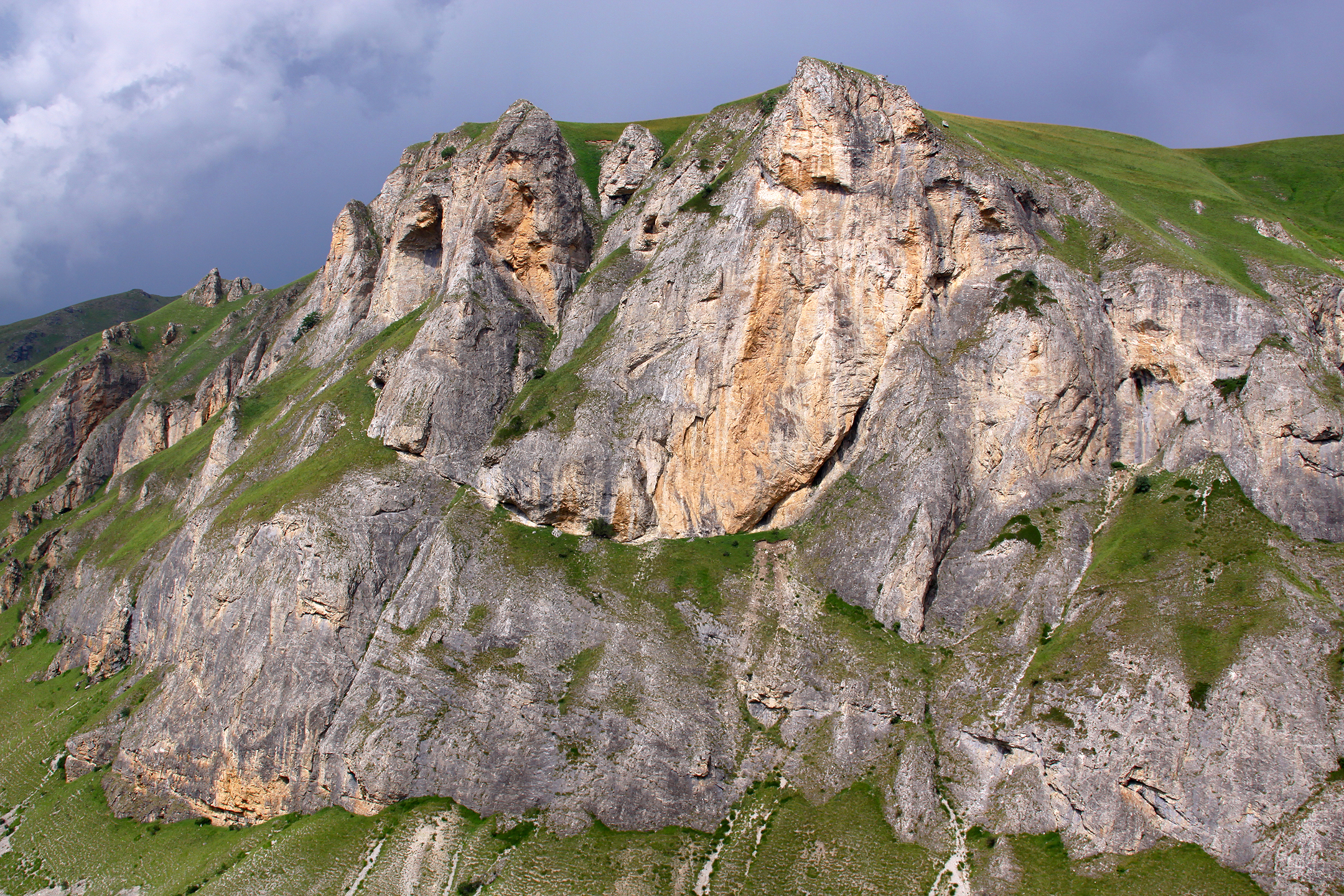
Rock outcrop at Brod

== Geologic history, stratigraphy and tectonics ==
- Kacanik Flysch
- Vrska Cuka granite: An example of Carpatho-Balkan units. Early Paleozoic granites followed by a gap in the Aptian and pelagic clastic rocks from the Cretaceous.
- Novo Brdo area: Part of the Central Vardar zone. Situated south of a highly tectonized domain. Novo Brdo schist formed in the Triassic in a volcano-sedimentary basin.
- Brezovica harzburgite.
