= List of birds of Kosovo =

This is a list of the bird species recorded in Kosovo. The avifauna of Kosovo includes a total of 282 species, one of which was introduced, documented from field records and historical accounts. Introduced and accidental species are included in the total counts for Kosovo.

The list's taxonomic treatment (designation and sequence of orders, families and species) and nomenclature (common and scientific names) follow the conventions of the BirdLife International Checklist of the Birds of the World, 2022 edition. The family accounts at the beginning of each heading reflect this taxonomy, as do the species counts found in each family account.

The following tags have been used to highlight several categories, but not all species fall into one of these categories. Those that do not are commonly occurring native species.

- (A) Accidental – a species that rarely or accidentally occurs in Kosovo
- (I) Introduced – a species introduced to Kosovo as a consequence, direct or indirect, of human actions
- (Ex) Extirpated – a species that no longer occurs in Kosovo although populations exist elsewhere

LC = least concern NT = near threatened VU = vulnerable EN = endangered CR = critically endangered EW = extinct in the wild EX = extinct

== Ducks, geese, and waterfowl ==
Order: Anseriformes — Family: Anatidae

- Greylag goose, Anser anser LC
- Greater white-fronted goose, Anser albifrons LC
- Lesser white-fronted goose, Anser erythropus (A) VU
- Taiga bean goose, Anser fabalis LC
- Mute swan, Cygnus olor LC
- Common shelduck, Tadorna tadorna LC
- Garganey, Spatula querquedula LC
- Northern shoveler, Spatula clypeata LC
- Gadwall, Mareca strepera LC
- Eurasian wigeon, Mareca penelope LC
- Mallard, Anas platyrhynchos LC
- Northern pintail, Anas acuta LC
- Common teal, Anas crecca LC
- Red-crested pochard, Netta rufina (A) LC
- Common pochard, Aythya ferina (A) VU
- Ferruginous duck, Aythya nyroca NT
- Tufted duck, Aythya fuligula LC
- Common goldeneye, Bucephala clangula LC
- Smew, Mergellus albellus LC
- Goosander, Mergus merganser LC
- Red-breasted merganser, Mergus serrator LC

== Pheasants, grouse, and allies ==
Order: Galliformes — Family: Phasianidae

- Common quail, Coturnix coturnix LC
- Rock partridge, Alectoris graeca (A) NT
- Common pheasant, Phasianus colchicus (I) LC
- Grey partridge, Perdix perdix LC
- Hazel grouse, Tetrastes bonasia LC
- Western capercaillie, Tetrao urogallus LC
- Black grouse, Lyrurus tetrix (Ex) LC

== Pigeons and doves ==
Order: Columbiformes — Family: Columbidae

- Rock pigeon, Columba livia LC
- Stock dove, Columba oenas LC
- Common wood pigeon, Columba palumbus LC
- European turtle dove, Streptopelia turtur (A) VU
- Eurasian collared dove, Streptopelia decaocto LC

== Bustards ==
Order: Otidiformes — Family: Otididae

- Great bustard, Otis tarda (Ex) VU
- Little bustard, Tetrax tetrax (Ex) NT

== Cuckoos ==
Order: Cuculiformes — Family: Cuculidae

- Common cuckoo, Cuculus canorus LC

== Nightjars ==
Order: Caprimulgiformes — Family: Caprimulgidae

- Eurasian nightjar, Caprimulgus europaeus LC

== Swifts ==
Order: Apodiformes — Family: Apodidae

- Alpine swift, Tachymarptis melba LC
- Common swift, Apus apus LC
- Pallid swift, Apus pallidus LC

== Rails, gallinules, and coots ==
Order: Gruiformes — Family: Rallidae

- Water rail, Rallus aquaticus LC
- Corn crake, Crex crex LC
- Spotted crake, Porzana porzana LC
- Eurasian moorhen, Gallinula chloropus LC
- Eurasian coot, Fulica atra LC
- Little crake, Zapornia parva LC

== Cranes ==
Order: Gruiformes — Family: Gruidae

- Common crane, Grus grus LC

== Thick-knees ==
Order: Charadriiformes — Family: Burhinidae

- Eurasian thick-knee, Burhinus oedicnemus LC

== Avocets and stilts ==
Order: Charadriiformes — Family: Recurvirostridae

- Black-winged stilt, Himantopus himantopus LC
- Pied avocet, Recurvirostra avosetta LC

== Oystercatchers ==
Order: Charadriiformes — Family: Haematopodidae

- Eurasian oystercatcher, Haematopus ostralegus NT

== Plovers and lapwings ==
Order: Charadriiformes — Family: Charadriidae

- European golden plover, Pluvialis apricaria LC
- Common ringed plover, Charadrius hiaticula LC
- Little ringed plover, Charadrius dubius LC
- Northern lapwing, Vanellus vanellus NT

== Sandpipers and allies ==
Order: Charadriiformes — Family: Scolopacidae

- Eurasian whimbrel, Numenius phaeopus LC
- Eurasian curlew, Numenius arquata NT
- Black-tailed godwit, Limosa limosa NT
- Jack snipe, Lymnocryptes minimus LC
- Eurasian woodcock, Scolopax rusticola LC
- Great snipe, Gallinago media NT
- Common snipe, Gallinago gallinago LC
- Red-necked phalarope, Phalaropus lobatus LC
- Common sandpiper, Actitis hypoleucos LC
- Green sandpiper, Tringa ochropus LC
- Marsh sandpiper, Tringa stagnatilis LC
- Wood sandpiper, Tringa glareola LC
- Common redshank, Tringa totanus LC
- Spotted redshank, Tringa erythropus LC
- Common greenshank, Tringa nebularia LC
- Ruff, Calidris pugnax LC
- Curlew sandpiper, Calidris ferruginea VU
- Sanderling, Calidris alba LC
- Dunlin, Calidris alpina LC
- Little stint, Calidris minuta LC

== Pratincoles ==
Order: Charadriiformes — Family: Glareolidae

- Collared pratincole, Glareola pratincola LC

== Gulls and terns ==
Order: Charadriiformes — Family: Laridae

- Little gull, Hydrocoloeus minutus LC
- Slender-billed gull, Chroicocephalus genei LC
- Black-headed gull, Chroicocephalus ridibundus LC
- Common gull, Larus canus LC
- Caspian gull, Larus cachinnans LC
- Yellow-legged gull, Larus michahellis LC
- Gull-billed tern, Gelochelidon nilotica LC
- Caspian tern, Hydroprogne caspia LC
- Whiskered tern, Chlidonias hybrida LC
- Black tern, Chlidonias niger LC
- White-winged tern, Chlidonias leucopterus LC
- Common tern, Sterna hirundo LC

== Grebes ==
Order: Podicipediformes — Family: Podicipedidae

- Little grebe, Tachybaptus ruficollis LC
- Great crested grebe, Podiceps cristatus LC
- Eared grebe, Podiceps nigricollis LC

== Storks ==
Order: Ciconiiformes — Family: Ciconiidae

- Black stork, Ciconia nigra LC
- White stork, Ciconia ciconia LC

== Cormorants ==
Order: Suliformes — Family: Phalacrocoracidae

- Pygmy cormorant, Microcarbo pygmeus LC
- Great cormorant, Phalacrocorax carbo LC

== Ibises and spoonbills ==
Order: Pelecaniformes — Family: Threskiornithidae

- Eurasian spoonbill, Platalea leucorodia LC

== Herons, egrets, and bitterns ==
Order: Pelecaniformes — Family: Ardeidae

- Eurasian bittern, Botaurus stellaris LC
- Little bittern, Botaurus minutus LC
- Black-crowned night heron, Nycticorax nycticorax LC
- Little egret, Egretta garzetta LC
- Squacco heron, Ardeola ralloides LC
- Western cattle egret, Ardea ibis (A) LC
- Great egret, Ardea alba LC
- Grey heron, Ardea cinerea LC
- Purple heron, Ardea purpurea LC

== Osprey ==
Order: Accipitriformes — Family: Pandionidae

- Osprey, Pandion haliaetus LC

== Hawks, eagles, and kites ==
Order: Accipitriformes — Family: Accipitridae

- Egyptian vulture, Neophron percnopterus EN
- European honey buzzard, Pernis apivorus LC
- Cinereous vulture, Aegypius monachus (A) NT
- Eurasian griffon, Gyps fulvus LC
- Short-toed snake eagle, Circaetus gallicus LC
- Lesser spotted eagle, Clanga pomarina LC
- Greater spotted eagle, Clanga clanga VU
- Booted eagle, Hieraaetus pennatus LC
- Imperial eagle, Aquila heliaca VU
- Golden eagle, Aquila chrysaetos LC
- Bonelli's eagle, Aquila fasciata LC
- Levant sparrowhawk, Accipiter brevipes LC
- Eurasian sparrowhawk, Accipiter nisus LC
- Northern goshawk, Accipiter gentilis LC
- Western marsh harrier, Circus aeruginosus LC
- Hen harrier, Circus cyaneus LC
- Pallid harrier, Circus macrourus NT
- Montagu's harrier, Circus pygargus LC
- Red kite, Milvus milvus LC
- Black kite, Milvus migrans LC
- Rough-legged buzzard, Buteo lagopus LC
- Common buzzard, Buteo buteo LC
- Long-legged buzzard, Buteo rufinus LC

== Owls ==
Order: Strigiformes — Families: Tytonidae, Strigidae

- Western barn owl, Tyto alba LC
- Eurasian scops owl, Otus scops LC
- Eurasian eagle-owl, Bubo bubo LC
- Eurasian pygmy owl, Glaucidium passerinum (A) LC
- Little owl, Athene noctua LC
- Tawny owl, Strix aluco LC
- Ural owl, Strix uralensis LC
- Long-eared owl, Asio otus LC
- Boreal owl, Aegolius funereus LC

== Hoopoes ==
Order: Bucerotiformes — Family: Upupidae

- Eurasian hoopoe, Upupa epops LC

== Bee-eaters ==
Order: Coraciiformes — Family: Meropidae

- European bee-eater, Merops apiaster LC

== Kingfishers ==
Order: Coraciiformes — Family: Alcedinidae

- Common kingfisher, Alcedo atthis LC

== Rollers ==
Order: Coraciiformes — Family: Coraciidae

- European roller, Coracias garrulus LC

== Woodpeckers ==
Order: Piciformes — Family: Picidae

- Eurasian wryneck, Jynx torquilla LC
- Eurasian three-toed woodpecker, Picoides tridactylus LC
- Middle spotted woodpecker, Dendrocoptes medius LC
- White-backed woodpecker, Dendrocopos leucotos LC
- Great spotted woodpecker, Dendrocopos major LC
- Syrian woodpecker, Dendrocopos syriacus LC
- Lesser spotted woodpecker, Dryobates minor LC
- Grey-headed woodpecker, Picus canus LC
- Eurasian green woodpecker, Picus viridis LC
- Black woodpecker, Dryocopus martius LC

== Falcons ==
Order: Falconiformes — Family: Falconidae

- Lesser kestrel, Falco naumanni LC
- Eurasian kestrel, Falco tinnunculus LC
- Red-footed falcon, Falco vespertinus VU
- Merlin, Falco columbarius LC
- Eurasian hobby, Falco subbuteo LC
- Lanner falcon, Falco biarmicus LC
- Saker falcon, Falco cherrug EN
- Peregrine falcon, Falco peregrinus LC

== Passerines ==
(Representative families and species)

=== Oriolidae ===
- Eurasian golden oriole, Oriolus oriolus LC

=== Laniidae ===
- Red-backed shrike, Lanius collurio LC
- Great grey shrike, Lanius excubitor LC
- Lesser grey shrike, Lanius minor LC
- Woodchat shrike, Lanius senator LC

=== Corvidae ===
- Eurasian jay, Garrulus glandarius LC
- Eurasian magpie, Pica pica LC
- Northern nutcracker, Nucifraga caryocatactes LC
- Red-billed chough, Pyrrhocorax pyrrhocorax LC
- Yellow-billed chough, Pyrrhocorax graculus LC
- Western jackdaw, Coloeus monedula LC
- Rook, Corvus frugilegus LC
- Hooded crow, Corvus cornix LC
- Common raven, Corvus corax LC

=== Paridae ===
- Coal tit, Periparus ater LC
- Crested tit, Lophophanes cristatus LC
- Sombre tit, Poecile lugubris LC
- Marsh tit, Poecile palustris LC
- Willow tit, Poecile montanus LC
- Eurasian blue tit, Cyanistes caeruleus LC
- Great tit, Parus major LC

=== Remizidae ===
- Eurasian penduline tit, Remiz pendulinus LC

=== Alaudidae ===
- Wood lark, Lullula arborea LC
- Eurasian skylark, Alauda arvensis LC
- Crested lark, Galerida cristata LC
- Horned lark, Eremophila alpestris LC
- Greater short-toed lark, Calandrella brachydactyla LC
- Calandra lark, Melanocorypha calandra LC

=== Panuridae ===
- Bearded reedling, Panurus biarmicus LC

=== Acrocephalidae ===
- Eastern olivaceous warbler, Iduna pallida LC
- Icterine warbler, Hippolais icterina LC
- Aquatic warbler, Acrocephalus paludicola VU
- Moustached warbler, Acrocephalus melanopogon LC
- Sedge warbler, Acrocephalus schoenobaenus LC
- Marsh warbler, Acrocephalus palustris LC
- Common reed warbler, Acrocephalus scirpaceus LC
- Great reed warbler, Acrocephalus arundinaceus LC

=== Locustellidae ===
- River warbler, Locustella fluviatilis LC
- Savi's warbler, Locustella luscinioides LC

=== Hirundinidae ===
- Bank swallow, Riparia riparia LC
- Eurasian crag martin, Ptyonoprogne rupestris LC
- Barn swallow, Hirundo rustica LC
- Western house martin, Delichon urbicum LC
- European red-rumped swallow, Cecropis rufula LC

=== Phylloscopidae ===
- Wood warbler, Phylloscopus sibilatrix LC
- Eastern Bonelli's warbler, Phylloscopus orientalis LC
- Willow warbler, Phylloscopus trochilus LC
- Common chiffchaff, Phylloscopus collybita LC

=== Cettiidae ===
- Cetti's warbler, Cettia cetti LC

=== Aegithalidae ===
- Long-tailed tit, Aegithalos caudatus LC

=== Sylviidae ===
- Eurasian blackcap, Sylvia atricapilla LC
- Garden warbler, Sylvia borin LC
- Barred warbler, Curruca nisoria LC
- Lesser whitethroat, Curruca curruca LC
- Western Orphean warbler, Curruca hortensis LC
- Eastern orphean warbler, Curruca crassirostris LC
- Sardinian warbler, Curruca melanocephala (A) LC
- Eastern subalpine warbler, Curruca cantillans LC
- Greater whitethroat, Curruca communis LC

=== Regulidae ===
- Goldcrest, Regulus regulus LC
- Common firecrest, Regulus ignicapilla LC

=== Tichodromidae ===
- Wallcreeper, Tichodroma muraria LC

=== Sittidae ===
- Eurasian nuthatch, Sitta europaea LC

=== Certhiidae ===
- Eurasian treecreeper, Certhia familiaris LC
- Short-toed treecreeper, Certhia brachydactyla LC

=== Troglodytidae ===
- Eurasian wren, Troglodytes troglodytes LC

=== Cinclidae ===
- White-throated dipper, Cinclus cinclus LC

=== Sturnidae ===
- European starling, Sturnus vulgaris LC
- Rosy starling, Pastor roseus LC

=== Turdidae ===
- Mistle thrush, Turdus viscivorus LC
- Song thrush, Turdus philomelos LC
- Redwing, Turdus iliacus NT
- Eurasian blackbird, Turdus merula LC
- Fieldfare, Turdus pilaris LC
- Ring ouzel, Turdus torquatus LC

=== Muscicapidae ===
- Spotted flycatcher, Muscicapa striata LC
- European robin, Erithacus rubecula LC
- Common nightingale, Luscinia megarhynchos LC
- Red-breasted flycatcher, Ficedula parva LC
- European pied flycatcher, Ficedula hypoleuca LC
- Collared flycatcher, Ficedula albicollis LC
- Common redstart, Phoenicurus phoenicurus LC
- Black redstart, Phoenicurus ochruros LC
- Rufous-tailed rock thrush, Monticola saxatilis LC
- Blue rock thrush, Monticola solitarius LC
- Whinchat, Saxicola rubetra LC
- European stonechat, Saxicola rubicola LC
- Northern wheatear, Oenanthe oenanthe LC
- Western black-eared wheatear, Oenanthe hispanica LC

=== Bombycillidae ===
- Bohemian waxwing, Bombycilla garrulus LC

=== Prunellidae ===
- Alpine accentor, Prunella collaris LC
- Dunnock, Prunella modularis LC

=== Passeridae ===
- House sparrow, Passer domesticus LC
- Spanish sparrow, Passer hispaniolensis LC
- Eurasian tree sparrow, Passer montanus LC
- Rock sparrow, Petronia petronia LC
- White-winged snowfinch, Montifringilla nivalis LC

=== Motacillidae ===
- Grey wagtail, Motacilla cinerea LC
- Western yellow wagtail, Motacilla flava LC
- White wagtail, Motacilla alba LC
- Tawny pipit, Anthus campestris LC
- Meadow pipit, Anthus pratensis NT
- Tree pipit, Anthus trivialis LC
- Water pipit, Anthus spinoletta LC

=== Fringillidae ===
- Common chaffinch, Fringilla coelebs LC
- Brambling, Fringilla montifringilla LC
- Hawfinch, Coccothraustes coccothraustes LC
- Pine grosbeak, Pinicola enucleator (A) LC
- Eurasian bullfinch, Pyrrhula pyrrhula LC
- European greenfinch, Chloris chloris LC
- Eurasian linnet, Linaria cannabina LC
- Red crossbill, Loxia curvirostra LC
- European goldfinch, Carduelis carduelis LC
- European serin, Serinus serinus LC
- Eurasian siskin, Spinus spinus LC

=== Emberizidae ===
- Black-headed bunting, Emberiza melanocephala LC
- Corn bunting, Emberiza calandra LC
- Rock bunting, Emberiza cia LC
- Cirl bunting, Emberiza cirlus LC
- Yellowhammer, Emberiza citrinella LC
- Ortolan bunting, Emberiza hortulana LC
- Reed bunting, Emberiza schoeniclus LC
