= Koznitsa =

Koznitsa (Bulgarian Cyrillic: Козница) may refer to any of the following locations in Bulgaria:

- Koznitsa (village), a village in Burgas Province
- Koznitsa (ridge), a ridge connecting Stara planina and Sredna gora mountains
  - Koznitsa (tunnel), a railway tunnel under the Koznitsa ridge, the longest tunnel in Bulgaria
- Koznitsa (peak), a mountain peak in the western part of Stara planina
