= International rankings of Kosovo =

Country of Kosovo

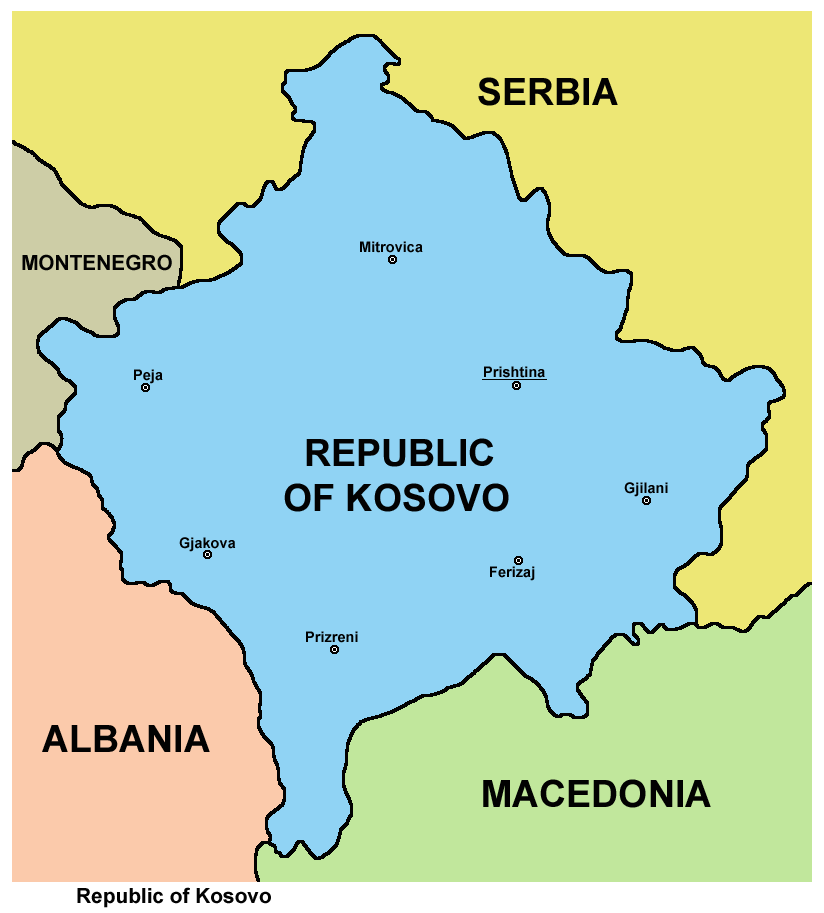
Map of the Republic of Kosovo

The following are international rankings of Kosovo:

== Demographics ==
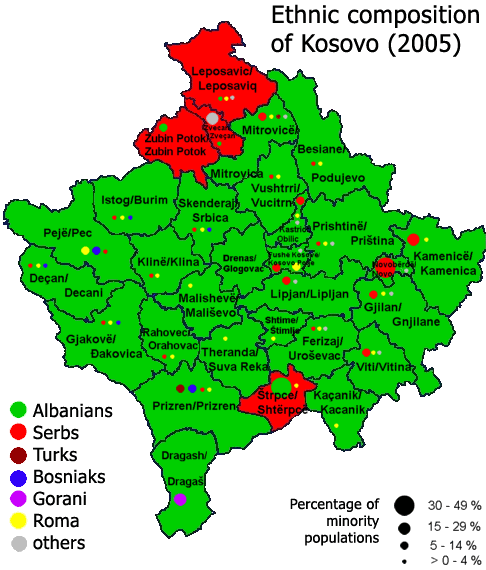
Ethnic composition of Kosovo in 2005 according to the Organization for Security and Co-operation in Europe.

- Population 2024, ranked 150 out of 244 countries.
- Population density 2023, ranked 87 out of 243 countries.
- CIA World Factbook: List of states by fertility rate 2024, ranked 129 out of 227 countries.
- CIA World Factbook: List of states by birth rate 2023, ranked 214 out of 233 countries.

== Economy ==
- International Monetary Fund: GDP (nominal) per capita 2024, ranked 105 out of 192 countries.
- International Monetary Fund: GDP (nominal) 2024, ranked 144 out of 189 countries.
- International Monetary Fund: GDP (nominal) per capita 2024, ranked 105 out of 192 countries.
- International Monetary Fund: GDP (nominal) 2024, ranked 144 out of 189 countries.
- World Bank: Ease of Doing Business Index 2020 report, ranked 57 out of 190 countries.
- United Nations: Human Development Index 2012, ranked 87 out of 187 countries.
- Forbes: The World's Happiest Countries 2010, ranked 54 out of 155 countries.

== Energy ==
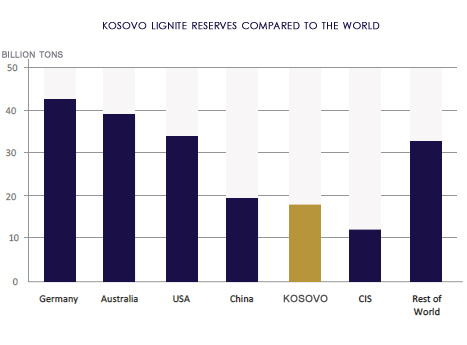
Kosovo lignite reserves compared to the world.

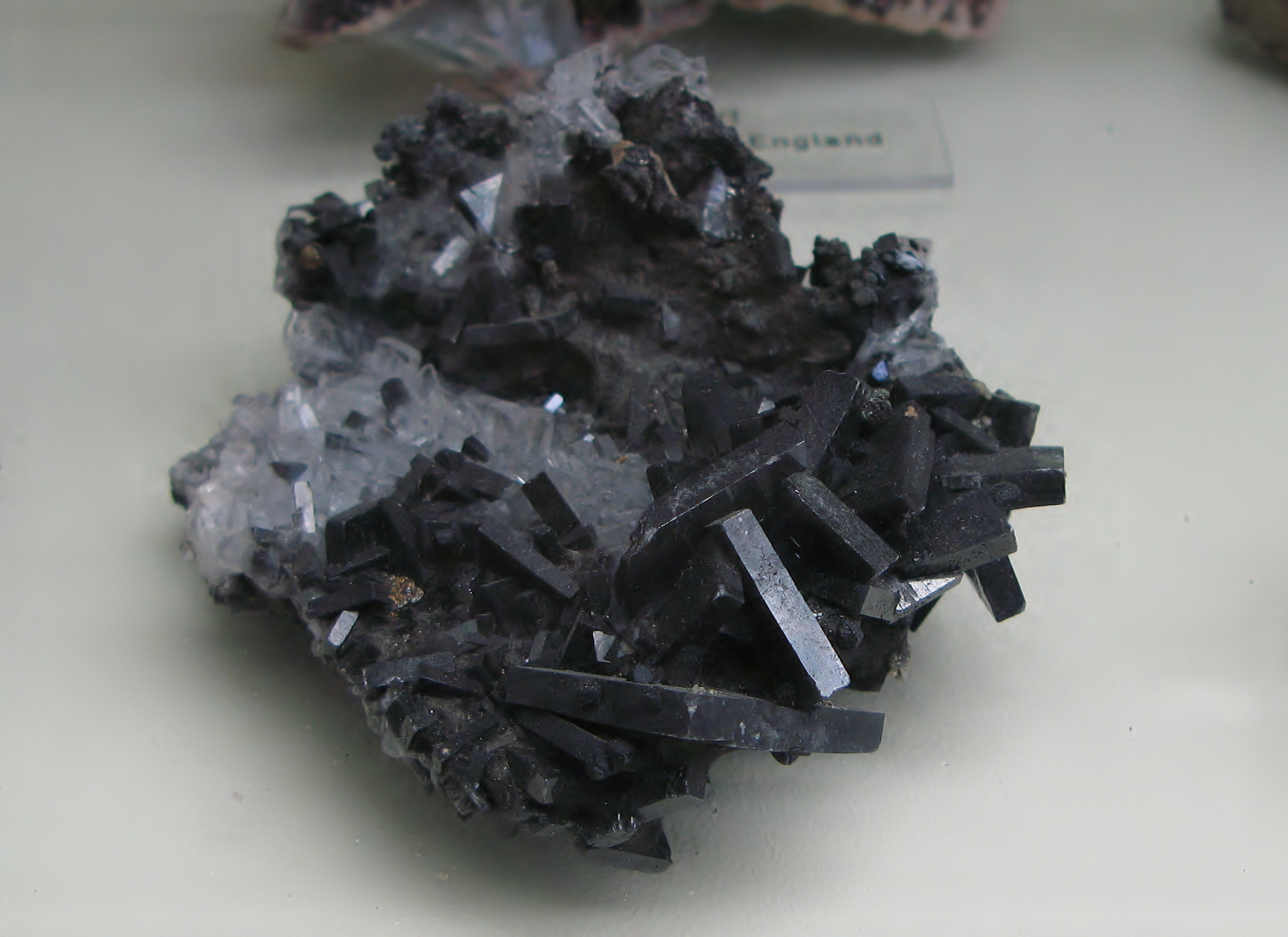
Baryte from Trepça Mines.

- The second largest coal reserves in Europe.
- The fifth largest reserve of lignite on the planet.

== Politics ==
- Reporters Without Borders: Press Freedom Index 2023, ranked 56th out of 180 countries.
- Freedom House: Freedom of the Press (report) 2017, ranked 96th out of 189 countries.
- Transparency International: Corruption Perceptions Index 2016, ranked 95th out of 178 countries.

== Religion ==
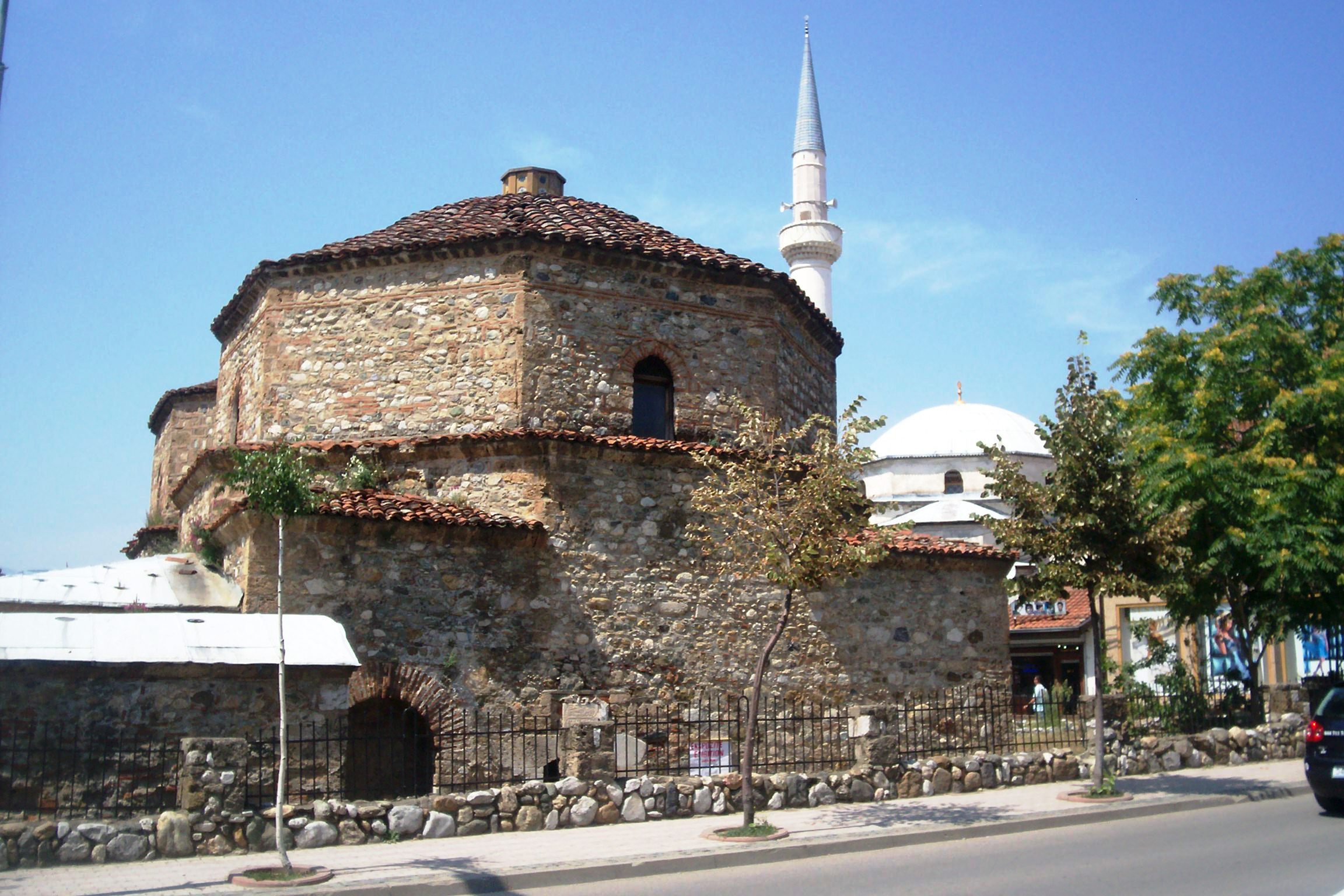
Church and Mosque in Prizren, symbol of religious tolerance.

- List of Muslim majority countries: ranked 31.
- The second European country with the highest concentration of Muslims (90%, only after Turkey).

== Geography ==
- Total area ranked 168 out of 249 countries.
- Coastline length: ranked 154 out of 154 countries.
