= Koznica =

- Location within Kosovo

Highest point
- Elevation: 1,230 m (4,040 ft)
- Coordinates: 42°39′32″N 21°22′30″E

Geography
- Location: Kosovo

Koznica (Albanian: Koznicë) is a mountain in eastern Kosovo, near the town of Artana. Its highest peak Gerbesh has an altitude of 1,230 metres (4,040 ft) above sea level. It is part of the Gollak mountains. The city of Pristina is located to the west of the mountain.
