= Climate of Kosovo =

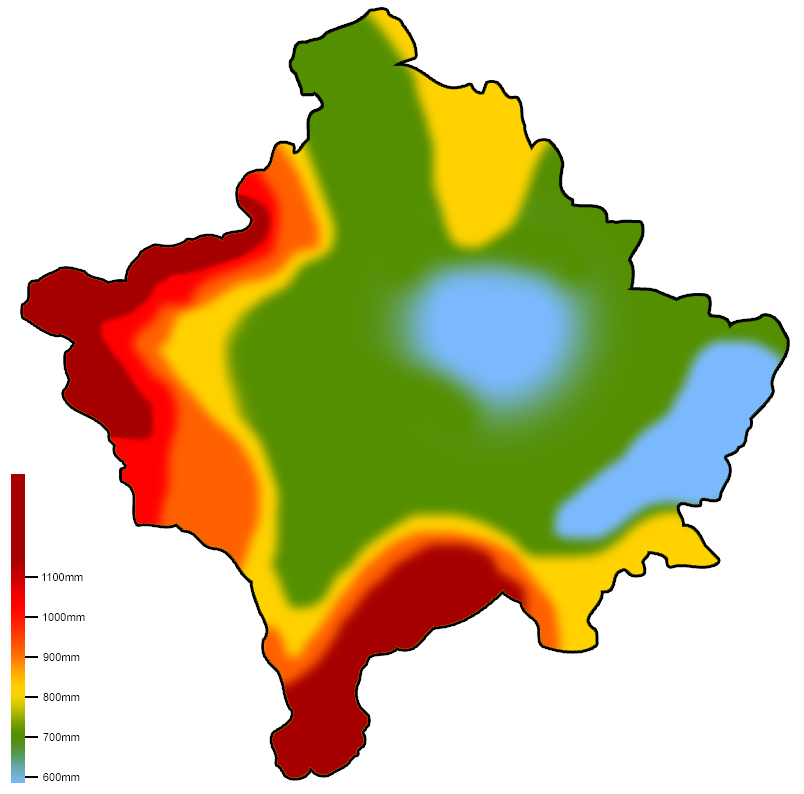

Kosovo is a relatively small country. Because of the climatic position and complicated structure of the relief it has a variety of climate systems.

Kosovo lies in the south part of the middle geographical latitude of the northern hemisphere and it is affected by the Mediterranean Mild Climate and European Continental Climate. Important factors that affect Kosovo's climate are: its position towards Eurasia and Africa, hydrographic masses (Atlantic Ocean and Mediterranean sea), atmospheric masses (tropic, arctic and continental) and others. Minor factors are: relief, hydrography, plain and vegetation.

== Areas ==
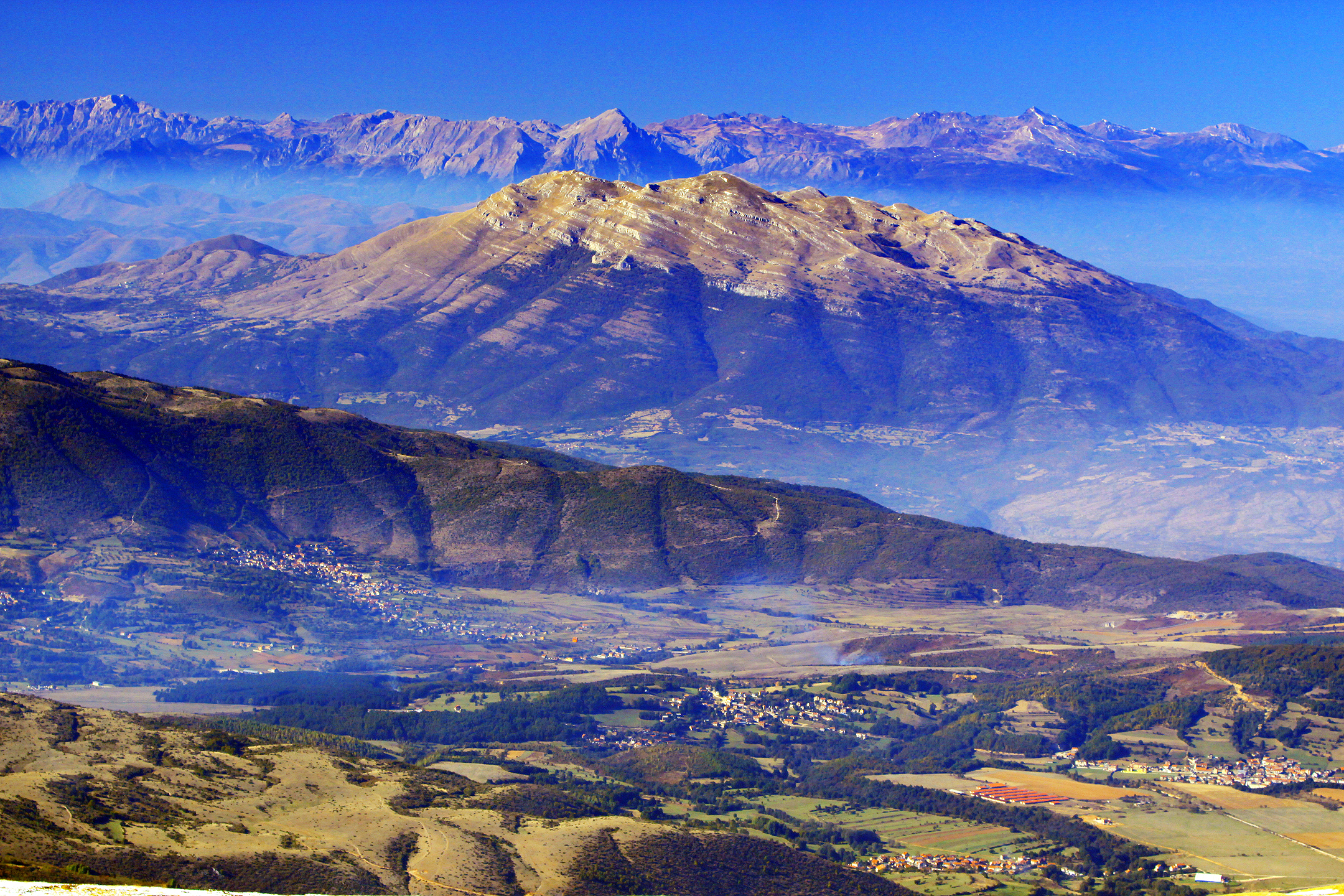
The view of Opoja region on the bottom, lower section of Koritnik, and Pashtrik mountain in the center.

The climatic area of the Ibar valley is influenced by continental air masses. For this reason, in this part of the region, the winters are colder with medium temperatures above −10 °C (14 °F), but sometimes down to −26 °C (−15 °F). The summers are not very hot with average temperatures of 20 °C (68 °F), but sometimes it will get up to 37 °C (99 °F). This area is characterized by a dry climate and a total annual precipitation of 600 mm per year, approximately.

The climatic area of Metohija, which includes the watershed of the White Drin river, is influenced very much by the hot air masses, which cross the Adriatic Sea. Medium temperatures during winter range from 0.5 °C (32.9 °F) to sometimes 22.8 °C (73.0 °F). The average annual precipitation of this climatic area is about 700 mm (28 in) per year. The winter is characterized by heavy snowfalls. The climatic area of the mountains and forest parts is characterised by a typical forest clime, that is associated with heavy rainfalls (900 to 1,300 mm (35 to 51 in) per year), and summers that are very short and cold, and winters that are cold and with a lot of snow. Finally, it can be stated that the Kosovo territory is characterised by a sunny climate with variable temperature and humidity conditions.

General air flows, physical, geographical and topographical characteristics enforce territorial and temporal changes of climatic elements.

== Air Temperature ==
Air Temperature is the main climatic element which tells the degree of air heat near-earth layers. In Kosovo there are thermal differences in horizontal and vertical direction. The eastern side is colder than the western part.

The average temperature of Kosovo for a year is 9.5 °C (49.1 °F). The warmest month is July with 28.3 °C (82.9 °F), the coldest is January with −18.7 °C (−1.7 °F). The highest average temperature for a year is in Prizren (12 °C (54 °F)), the lowest temperature in Podujevë (9 °C (48 °F)). Except Prizren and Istog, all other meteorological stations, in January have average temperatures under 0 °C (32 °F).

Except average temperature values, thermal characteristics of Kosovo will be better understood in the analyze of extreme values. Maximal values in all meteorological stations are higher than 35 °C (95 °F), while the absolute lowest value was registered on June 6, 1963 in Gjilan with a value of −32.5 °C (−26.5 °F). Based on the summary, the amplitude of the average of the average values in Kosovo is 20.5 °C (68.9 °F). Movements of air temperature from year to year are pretty much noticeable. In lower parts of Kosovo, tropic days usually last for 30 days.

Air temperatures in Kosovo measured in Celsius (°C)
| City | Elevation | Jan | Feb | Mar | Apr | May | Jun | Jul | Aug | Sep | Oct | Nov | Dec | Year |
|---|---|---|---|---|---|---|---|---|---|---|---|---|---|---|
| Peja | 523 | 0.1 | 1.3 | 5.9 | 11.5 | 15.4 | 19.5 | 22.2 | 20.9 | 17.7 | 12.6 | 7.9 | 0.8 | 11.3 |
| Prizren | 436 | 1.4 | 3.1 | 7.8 | 12.9 | 16.8 | 21.1 | 23.7 | 22.8 | 19.3 | 14 | 9.3 | 2.5 | 12.9 |
| Mitrovica | 521 | -0.7 | 0.5 | 5.3 | 10.5 | 14.9 | 18.9 | 21.5 | 20.3 | 16.8 | 11.9 | 7.2 | 0.5 | 10.6 |
| Prishtina | 630 | -0.9 | 0.1 | 4.8 | 10.5 | 14.9 | 19.1 | 21.1 | 20 | 16.3 | 11.8 | 7.1 | 0.3 | 10.4 |

== Precipitation ==
Precipitation is an important indicator of the climate in Kosovo and it represents a meteorological element with significant changes with time and territory. Key features of the rainfall of each territory are: the submission forms, their distribution during the year, annual amount, pluviometric regime, the number of days with precipitation and their intensity.

You can see all precipitation forms in Kosovo. Important significance has the rainfall in hills and valleys, and heavy snowfall in the high mountain areas such as Accursed Mountains and Šar Mountains. The presence of hail is an unfortunate phenomenon for the agriculture in Kosovo. This form of precipitation mostly occurs during July and August.

Even though Kosovo lies in a relatively small territory, there are noticeable differences between territories and their amount of precipitation. Kosovo is affected by middle-maritime and middle-continental precipitation regime. On the west, the middle-maritime form is more present. This type of precipitation regime is known for big rainfalls during the year (over 700 mm (28 in)), the maximum amount during November and the minimum during summer. The eastern part is affected by the middle-continental type of precipitation, which is known with lack of rainfall during a year (over 600 mm (24 in)), the maximum amount during May and the minimum during winter. The biggest amount of rainfall is in the west part of Accursed Mountains with over 1,750 mm (69 in), while the lowest amount of rainfall can be found in the east part – Kosovska Kamenica with less than 600 mm (24 in). Snowfall is a common occurrence during the cold months of the year. In the low parts of Kosovo there are averagely 26 days with snowfall, while the high parts have over 100 days. The number of days with snow and the thickness depend on the relief. Snowfall has an importance on keeping the wetness of the surface, creating water reserves, tourism etc.

== Winds ==
Winds are a random meteorological phenomenon in Kosovo. The dominant wind direction usually has the bigger force and speed. The average wind speed in Kosovo is 1.3 m/s in Peja to 2.4 m/s Ferizaj. Extreme wind speeds in Kosovo are around 31 m/s which occur during March and April; usually end up with causing damage on houses.

== Insolation ==
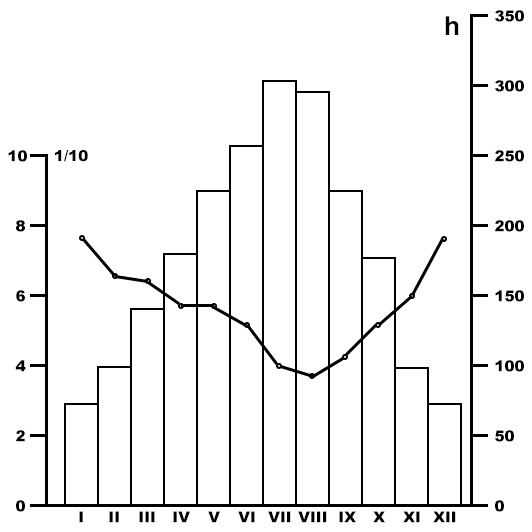
Graphical chart on Kosovo's insolation.

Insolation is a measure of solar radiation energy received on a given surface area and recorded during a given time. Insolation is a climatic element that has an importance in different economical activities such as: agriculture, tourism etc.

The period of insolation depends on astronomical, meteorological and relief factors. Insolation is smaller in narrow valleys, river valleys and mountain ranges as a result of the increase of overcast and elevation.

Kosovo has on average 2,066 hours with sun per year or approximately 5.7 hours per day. The highest insolation value is in Pristina with 2.140 hours for 1 year, while Peja with the smallest insolation value of 1.958 hours, with 2.067 hours and Prizren with 2.099 hours. The maximum insolation in Kosovo occurs during July, while the lowest insolation occurs in December.

== Climatic territorial differences ==
The climatic changes based on territories depend on various factors, such as: vegetation, humidity of the territory etc. Climate classifications are usually based on: wind exposure, mountain height and direction, climatic effects on vegetation and watercourses.

From all the climatic classifications made in Kosovo, the most accurate one is the one provided by W. Köppen. According to this classification, Kosovo is part of C and D types of climate. Kosovo's hot average climate during summer months is under 22 °C (72 °F) and the cold average is above −3 °C (27 °F). According to the thermal characteristics, amount of rainfall and their regime in low parts of Kosovo, we get two subtypes of climate:

- Dukagjin valley subtype and
- Kosovo valley subtype

The climatic subtype of the western part has soft winters and a big amount of rainfall. These characteristics are inherited by the Mediterranean mild climate. The climatic subtype of Kosovo has cold winters and lack of rainfall, characteristics inherited from the continental type of climate. Even though Kosovo has these climatic characteristics most of the time, there might be a major change in climate on certain years only. In 1992, Kosovo had a very hot and dry summer, which fits the B climatic type of Köppen. D-climatic type which is known for average temperatures of −3 °C (27 °F) during cold months and 15 °C (59 °F) during hot months can be found in high parts of Kosovo, such as Accursed Mountains, the Šar Mountains and Kopaonik. This type of climate is known by the name subalpine and alpine.

== Impact of climate change ==
Climate change plays a vital role in agriculture, rest, recreation, tourism, transport, medicine, and sanitary-hygienic conditions.

Kosovo has experienced rising temperatures over the past few decades, with winters becoming milder and summers increasingly hotter. In turn, this shift in temperature patterns is leading to Kosovo's increased energy consumption for cooling during the summer months and affecting agriculture and water resources.

A study by the UN Children’s Fund (UNICEF) examining the impact of climate change in Kosovo revealed that the country's youngest citizens are being particularly affected. The study found that the rapid environmental decline and worsening air pollution due to climate change are endangering their fundamental rights to health, education, and safety.

== Weatherboxes ==
Climate data for Pristina (1991-2020)
| Month | Jan | Feb | Mar | Apr | May | Jun | Jul | Aug | Sep | Oct | Nov | Dec | Year |
|---|---|---|---|---|---|---|---|---|---|---|---|---|---|
| Mean daily maximum °C (°F) | 3.3 (37.9) | 5.4 (41.7) | 10.1 (50.2) | 15.3 (59.5) | 19.8 (67.6) | 24.1 (75.4) | 26.8 (80.2) | 27.4 (81.3) | 21.6 (70.9) | 16.2 (61.2) | 10.3 (50.5) | 4.4 (39.9) | 15.4 (59.7) |
| Daily mean °C (°F) | −0.6 (30.9) | 1.1 (34.0) | 5.1 (41.2) | 10.1 (50.2) | 14.8 (58.6) | 18.9 (66.0) | 21.5 (70.7) | 21.8 (71.2) | 16.5 (61.7) | 11.2 (52.2) | 5.9 (42.6) | 0.8 (33.4) | 10.6 (51.1) |
| Mean daily minimum °C (°F) | −3.7 (25.3) | −2.5 (27.5) | 0.6 (33.1) | 4.9 (40.8) | 9.7 (49.5) | 13.8 (56.8) | 16.1 (61.0) | 16.3 (61.3) | 11.8 (53.2) | 7 (45) | 2.5 (36.5) | −2 (28) | 6.2 (43.2) |
| Average precipitation mm (inches) | 47 (1.9) | 45 (1.8) | 62 (2.4) | 73 (2.9) | 80 (3.1) | 67 (2.6) | 54 (2.1) | 40 (1.6) | 49 (1.9) | 48 (1.9) | 50 (2.0) | 60 (2.4) | 675 (26.6) |
| Average precipitation days | 7 | 6 | 8 | 9 | 10 | 9 | 7 | 6 | 6 | 6 | 7 | 8 | 89 |
| Mean daily sunshine hours | 4.7 | 5.3 | 7.1 | 9.1 | 10.1 | 11.2 | 11.5 | 11.0 | 8.6 | 6.7 | 5.7 | 4.5 | 8.0 |

Climate data for Pristina (1961–1990)
| Month | Jan | Feb | Mar | Apr | May | Jun | Jul | Aug | Sep | Oct | Nov | Dec | Year |
|---|---|---|---|---|---|---|---|---|---|---|---|---|---|
| Record high °C (°F) | 15.8 (60.4) | 20.2 (68.4) | 26.0 (78.8) | 29.0 (84.2) | 32.3 (90.1) | 36.3 (97.3) | 39.2 (102.6) | 36.8 (98.2) | 34.4 (93.9) | 29.3 (84.7) | 22.0 (71.6) | 15.6 (60.1) | 39.2 (102.6) |
| Mean daily maximum °C (°F) | 2.4 (36.3) | 5.5 (41.9) | 10.5 (50.9) | 15.7 (60.3) | 20.7 (69.3) | 23.9 (75.0) | 26.4 (79.5) | 26.7 (80.1) | 23.1 (73.6) | 17.1 (62.8) | 10.1 (50.2) | 4.1 (39.4) | 15.5 (59.9) |
| Daily mean °C (°F) | −1.3 (29.7) | 1.1 (34.0) | 5.0 (41.0) | 9.9 (49.8) | 14.7 (58.5) | 17.8 (64.0) | 19.7 (67.5) | 19.5 (67.1) | 15.9 (60.6) | 10.6 (51.1) | 5.1 (41.2) | 0.4 (32.7) | 9.8 (49.6) |
| Mean daily minimum °C (°F) | −4.9 (23.2) | −2.8 (27.0) | 0.2 (32.4) | 4.2 (39.6) | 8.5 (47.3) | 11.4 (52.5) | 12.5 (54.5) | 12.3 (54.1) | 9.4 (48.9) | 5.0 (41.0) | 0.9 (33.6) | −3.1 (26.4) | 4.4 (39.9) |
| Record low °C (°F) | −27.2 (−17.0) | −24.5 (−12.1) | −14.2 (6.4) | −5.3 (22.5) | −1.8 (28.8) | 0.5 (32.9) | 3.9 (39.0) | 4.4 (39.9) | −4.0 (24.8) | −8.0 (17.6) | −17.6 (0.3) | −20.6 (−5.1) | −27.2 (−17.0) |
| Average precipitation mm (inches) | 38.9 (1.53) | 36.1 (1.42) | 38.8 (1.53) | 48.8 (1.92) | 68.2 (2.69) | 60.3 (2.37) | 51.6 (2.03) | 44.0 (1.73) | 42.1 (1.66) | 45.4 (1.79) | 68.2 (2.69) | 55.5 (2.19) | 597.9 (23.54) |
| Average precipitation days (≥ 0.1 mm) | 13.6 | 12.3 | 11.4 | 12.1 | 12.8 | 11.9 | 8.3 | 7.9 | 7.5 | 8.6 | 12.3 | 14.5 | 133.2 |
| Average snowy days | 10.2 | 8.3 | 6.2 | 1.5 | 0.0 | 0.0 | 0.0 | 0.0 | 0.0 | 0.5 | 3.4 | 8.1 | 38.2 |
| Average relative humidity (%) | 83 | 77 | 70 | 65 | 67 | 67 | 63 | 62 | 68 | 74 | 80 | 83 | 71 |
| Mean monthly sunshine hours | 70.8 | 96.0 | 143.0 | 184.0 | 227.9 | 246.3 | 299.3 | 289.6 | 225.8 | 173.5 | 96.9 | 70.2 | 2,123.3 |
Source: Republic Hydrometeorological Service of Serbia

Climate data for Prizren (1961–1990)
| Month | Jan | Feb | Mar | Apr | May | Jun | Jul | Aug | Sep | Oct | Nov | Dec | Year |
|---|---|---|---|---|---|---|---|---|---|---|---|---|---|
| Record high °C (°F) | 20.2 (68.4) | 22.4 (72.3) | 26.0 (78.8) | 31.3 (88.3) | 33.8 (92.8) | 40.6 (105.1) | 40.8 (105.4) | 37.3 (99.1) | 35.8 (96.4) | 31.4 (88.5) | 25.6 (78.1) | 23.7 (74.7) | 40.8 (105.4) |
| Mean daily maximum °C (°F) | 3.3 (37.9) | 6.8 (44.2) | 11.9 (53.4) | 17.2 (63.0) | 22.5 (72.5) | 26.0 (78.8) | 28.5 (83.3) | 28.3 (82.9) | 24.5 (76.1) | 18.0 (64.4) | 11.1 (52.0) | 5.0 (41.0) | 16.9 (62.4) |
| Daily mean °C (°F) | 0.0 (32.0) | 2.8 (37.0) | 7.1 (44.8) | 11.9 (53.4) | 16.8 (62.2) | 20.2 (68.4) | 22.2 (72.0) | 21.8 (71.2) | 18.1 (64.6) | 12.3 (54.1) | 6.9 (44.4) | 1.8 (35.2) | 11.8 (53.2) |
| Mean daily minimum °C (°F) | −3.0 (26.6) | −0.6 (30.9) | 2.7 (36.9) | 6.9 (44.4) | 11.3 (52.3) | 14.4 (57.9) | 15.8 (60.4) | 15.4 (59.7) | 12.1 (53.8) | 7.3 (45.1) | 3.2 (37.8) | −1.0 (30.2) | 7.1 (44.8) |
| Record low °C (°F) | −23.6 (−10.5) | −19.1 (−2.4) | −11.7 (10.9) | −2.6 (27.3) | −0.4 (31.3) | 3.8 (38.8) | 7.3 (45.1) | 7.0 (44.6) | −0.8 (30.6) | −4.3 (24.3) | −12.6 (9.3) | −17.4 (0.7) | −23.6 (−10.5) |
| Average precipitation mm (inches) | 76.2 (3.00) | 54.1 (2.13) | 63.5 (2.50) | 61.1 (2.41) | 66.7 (2.63) | 69.7 (2.74) | 58.6 (2.31) | 127.4 (5.02) | 58.2 (2.29) | 55.1 (2.17) | 88.3 (3.48) | 81.1 (3.19) | 860.0 (33.86) |
| Average precipitation days (≥ 0.1 mm) | 12.8 | 12.1 | 12.1 | 12.8 | 12.3 | 11.6 | 8.9 | 7.5 | 8.1 | 9.3 | 12.6 | 13.5 | 133.6 |
| Average snowy days | 7.6 | 5.6 | 3.8 | 0.4 | 0.0 | 0.0 | 0.0 | 0.0 | 0.0 | 0.1 | 2.1 | 5.8 | 25.4 |
| Average relative humidity (%) | 81 | 75 | 68 | 64 | 64 | 61 | 58 | 59 | 67 | 74 | 79 | 82 | 69 |
| Mean monthly sunshine hours | 100.2 | 92.0 | 139.4 | 176.2 | 224.5 | 290.7 | 300.8 | 285.7 | 220.7 | 163.4 | 89.7 | 54.1 | 2,137.4 |
Source: Republic Hydrometeorological Service of Serbia

Climate data for Peja (1961–1990)
| Month | Jan | Feb | Mar | Apr | May | Jun | Jul | Aug | Sep | Oct | Nov | Dec | Year |
|---|---|---|---|---|---|---|---|---|---|---|---|---|---|
| Record high °C (°F) | 15.4 (59.7) | 22.6 (72.7) | 25.0 (77.0) | 28.0 (82.4) | 31.5 (88.7) | 35.8 (96.4) | 38.2 (100.8) | 35.9 (96.6) | 34.1 (93.4) | 28.3 (82.9) | 22.9 (73.2) | 18.9 (66.0) | 38.2 (100.8) |
| Mean daily maximum °C (°F) | 2.8 (37.0) | 6.0 (42.8) | 10.9 (51.6) | 16.1 (61.0) | 20.9 (69.6) | 24.1 (75.4) | 26.5 (79.7) | 26.4 (79.5) | 22.7 (72.9) | 16.9 (62.4) | 10.1 (50.2) | 4.5 (40.1) | 15.7 (60.3) |
| Daily mean °C (°F) | −0.5 (31.1) | 2.1 (35.8) | 6.4 (43.5) | 11.2 (52.2) | 15.9 (60.6) | 19.0 (66.2) | 21.1 (70.0) | 20.8 (69.4) | 17.2 (63.0) | 11.8 (53.2) | 5.9 (42.6) | 1.2 (34.2) | 11.1 (52.0) |
| Mean daily minimum °C (°F) | −3.6 (25.5) | −1.5 (29.3) | 2.0 (35.6) | 6.1 (43.0) | 10.3 (50.5) | 13.3 (55.9) | 15.0 (59.0) | 14.8 (58.6) | 11.5 (52.7) | 6.8 (44.2) | 2.3 (36.1) | −1.8 (28.8) | 6.3 (43.3) |
| Record low °C (°F) | −24.8 (−12.6) | −19.3 (−2.7) | −13.6 (7.5) | −3.8 (25.2) | 0.6 (33.1) | 3.5 (38.3) | 6.7 (44.1) | 5.2 (41.4) | −1.2 (29.8) | −4.8 (23.4) | −15.3 (4.5) | −15.2 (4.6) | −24.8 (−12.6) |
| Average precipitation mm (inches) | 85.9 (3.38) | 71.5 (2.81) | 65.2 (2.57) | 67.2 (2.65) | 68.2 (2.69) | 53.0 (2.09) | 54.7 (2.15) | 48.0 (1.89) | 52.1 (2.05) | 75.3 (2.96) | 118.2 (4.65) | 91.4 (3.60) | 850.7 (33.49) |
| Average precipitation days (≥ 0.1 mm) | 12.0 | 12.3 | 11.3 | 11.5 | 13.0 | 13.2 | 9.9 | 8.7 | 8.1 | 9.5 | 12.3 | 13.3 | 135.1 |
| Average snowy days | 8.1 | 6.0 | 3.7 | 0.6 | 0.0 | 0.0 | 0.0 | 0.0 | 0.0 | 0.1 | 2.0 | 6.5 | 27.0 |
| Average relative humidity (%) | 81 | 75 | 68 | 63 | 64 | 64 | 60 | 60 | 67 | 73 | 81 | 83 | 70 |
| Mean monthly sunshine hours | 69.5 | 93.3 | 143.0 | 172.0 | 207.8 | 257.7 | 274.3 | 264.9 | 206.3 | 152.6 | 86.8 | 55.3 | 1,983.5 |
Source: Republic Hydrometeorological Service of Serbia

== See also ==
- Kosovo
- Geography of Kosovo
- Tourism in Kosovo

== Bibliography ==
- Çavolli, Riza (1993). Gjeografia e Kosovës. ETMMK.
- Geographical Association of Kosova (2008). Geographical Exploration. SHOQATA E GJEOGRAFËVE TË KOSOVËS.
- Group of authors (2004). 40 Vjetori i Departamentit të Gjeografisë. DEPARTAMENTI I GJEOGRAFISË. ISBN 9951-00-032-0
