= Geography of Kosovo =

- Continent: Europe
- Region: Southeast Europe (Balkans)
- Area
  - Total: 10,887 km^{2} (4,203 sq mi)
  - Land: 99%
  - Water: 1%
- Coastline: 0 km (0 mi)
- Borders: Albania 113.551 km (70.557 mi); Montenegro 79.165 km (49.191 mi); North Macedonia 170.772 km (106.113 mi); Serbia 380.068 km (236.163 mi)
- Highest point: Velika Rudoka; 2,660 m (8,727 ft)
- Lowest point: White Drin; 297 m (974 ft)
- Longest river: White Drin; 122 km (76 mi)
- Largest lake: Lake Ujman (Gazivoda); 9.2 km^{2} (4 sq mi)
- Climate: Temperate Zone; Continental and Mediterranean
- Terrain: Mountains, Hills, Forest, urban

Kosovo is a landlocked country in Southeastern Europe. The country is strategically positioned in the center of the Balkan Peninsula enclosed by Montenegro to the west, Serbia to the north and east, North Macedonia to the southeast, and Albania to the southwest. It has no direct access to the Mediterranean Sea but its rivers flow into three seas, the Adriatic, Aegean and Black Sea.

The country possesses impressive and contrasting landscapes determined by the climate along with the geology and hydrology. Both, the Bjeshkët e Nemuna and Sharr Mountains, are the most defining feature of the country and simultaneously the most biodiverse regions of Kosovo. As far as the central region, the plains of Dukagjin and Kosovo stretches over the west and east, respectively. Additionally, Kosovo consists of multiple geographic and ethnographic regions, such as Drenica, Dushkaja, Gollak, Has, Highlands of Gjakova, Llap, Llapusha and Rugova.

The country is a quite rich country for its water sources, there are many long and short rivers, as well as artificial and natural lakes around the country. Most of the rivers that rise in Kosovo have their mouths outside the country's territory in the Adriatic, Aegean and Black Sea. The longest river is the Drini i Bardhë, while the shortest river is the Lumëbardhi i Prizrenit.

The climate of the country is mostly defined by its geographical location in the southeastern part of the european continent and strongly influenced by the seas in the west, south and east. It enjoys a combination of a continental climate and a mediterranean climate, with four distinct seasons.

Kosovo is characterised by rich flora and fauna, and a wide array of ecosystems and habitats considering its relatively small area. The country's biodiversity is conserved in two national parks and hundreds of other protected areas of different categories. The remote and forested regions are primarily inhabited by important species that are fast becoming rare in Southern Europe, amongst them the brown bear, grey wolf, lynx and golden eagle.

== Territory ==
=== Borders ===
The landlocked country of Kosovo lies in the heart of the Balkan Peninsula in Southeastern Europe. It borders the countries of Montenegro to the west, Serbia to the north and east, North Macedonia to the southeast and Albania to the southwest. The land area of the country is 10,910 square kilometres (4,210 sq mi), being the 161st-largest country in the world.

The border between Kosovo and Albania stretches for a total of 113.551 km (70.557 mi) and is situated along the southwestern edge of the country. This border is significantly marked by the Albanian Alps, the Koritnik and Gjallica Mountains, which occupy the vast expanse of land between the countries. The border between Kosovo and North Macedonia stretches for a total of 170.772 km (106.113 mi). This border is situated along the southeastern edge of the country, whereby the majority of this border follows the Sharr Mountains. The border between Kosovo and Montenegro measures at only 79.165 km (49.191 mi) in length, making it the shortest border in the country. This border is rugged and mountainous associated with the Albanian Alps. The border between Kosovo and Serbia stretches for a total of 380.068 km (236.163 mi) and is situated along the northern and eastern edge of the country.

== Physical geography ==
=== Topography ===
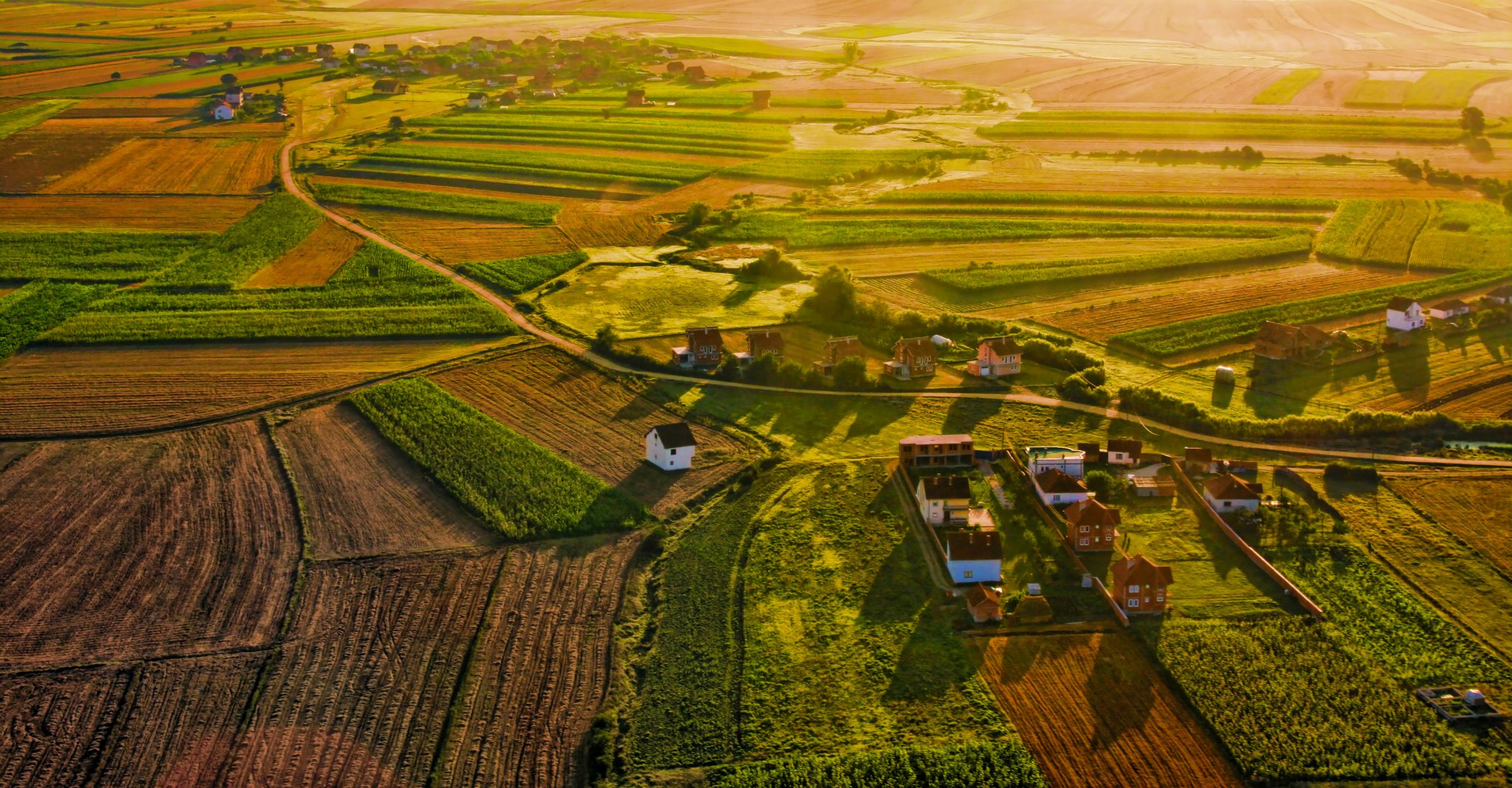
The Plain of Kosovo stretches in the east.

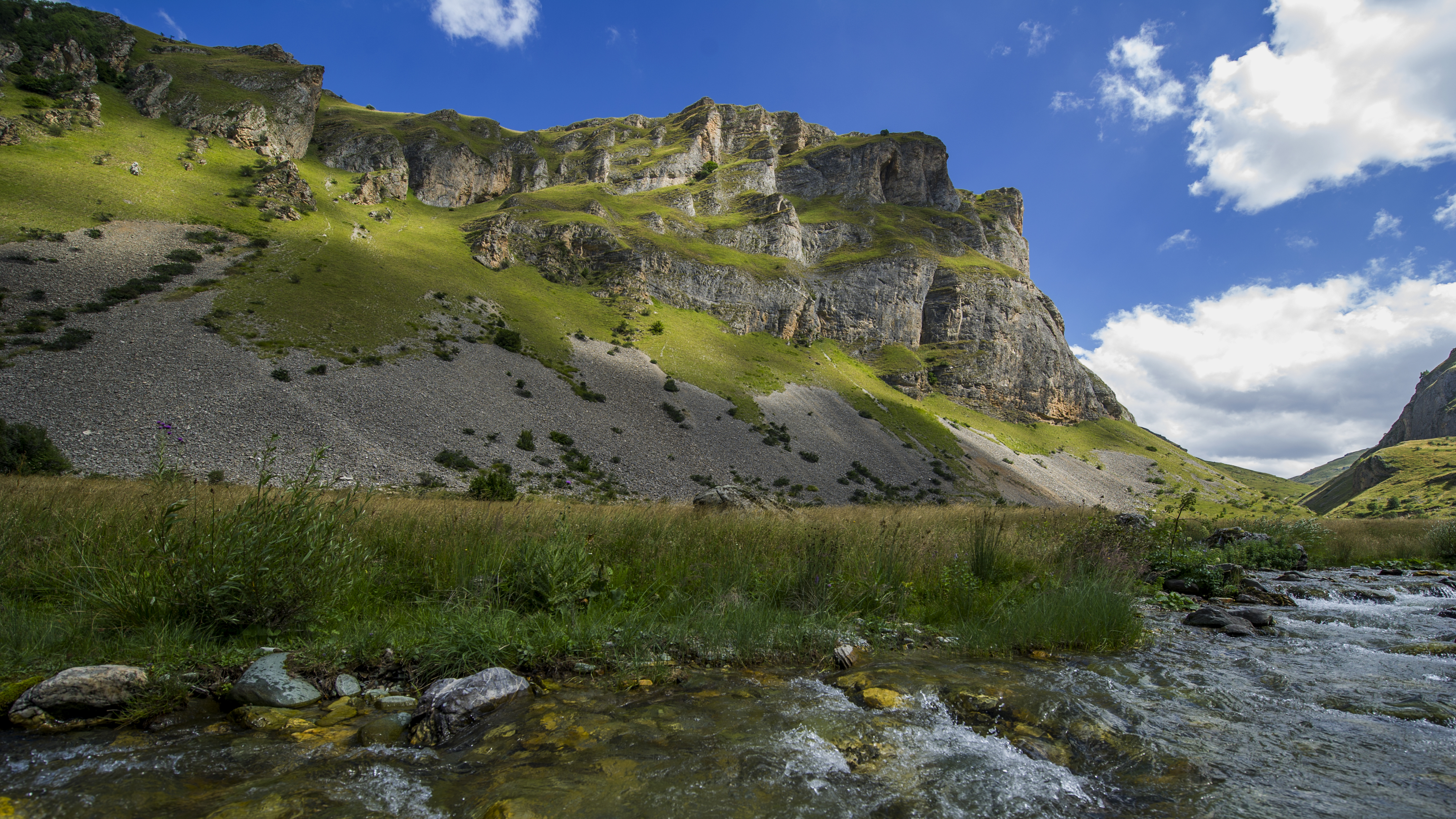
The Sharr Mountains stretches in the southeast.

The country of Kosovo features notable diversity with the landscape and relief. Framed along its borders by mountain ranges, as for instance the Albanian Alps, and the Sharr Mountains, the country's topography is clearly defined by two main plains, the plains of Dukagjini and Kosovo.

Most of the country is mountainous and hilly. The southern and southeastern edge is distinguished by the Sharr Mountains. The Albanian Alps dominate the western edge as they offer the highest mountain of Kosovo, Gjeravica. Often referred to as the Bjeshkët e Nemuna, the region is considered to be among the most inaccessible mountain range in Europe and the wildest range on the Balkan Peninsula, which is best described in their name.

Bjeshkët e Nemuna National Park and Sharr Mountains National Park were established to protect the landscape, scenery and natural environment of the country. They represent the most important regions of vegetation and biodiversity in the country, because they provide excellent conditions for a great wild and plant life.

The Kopaonik Mountains extend in the northern edge of the country and further run into central Serbia. They are characterized by its mineral wealth, especially abundant by lead and zinc, making it one of the richest regions in Europe. This is due to the diversity of its geological structure, particularly with the new vulcanization during the tertiary period.

=== Hydrography ===
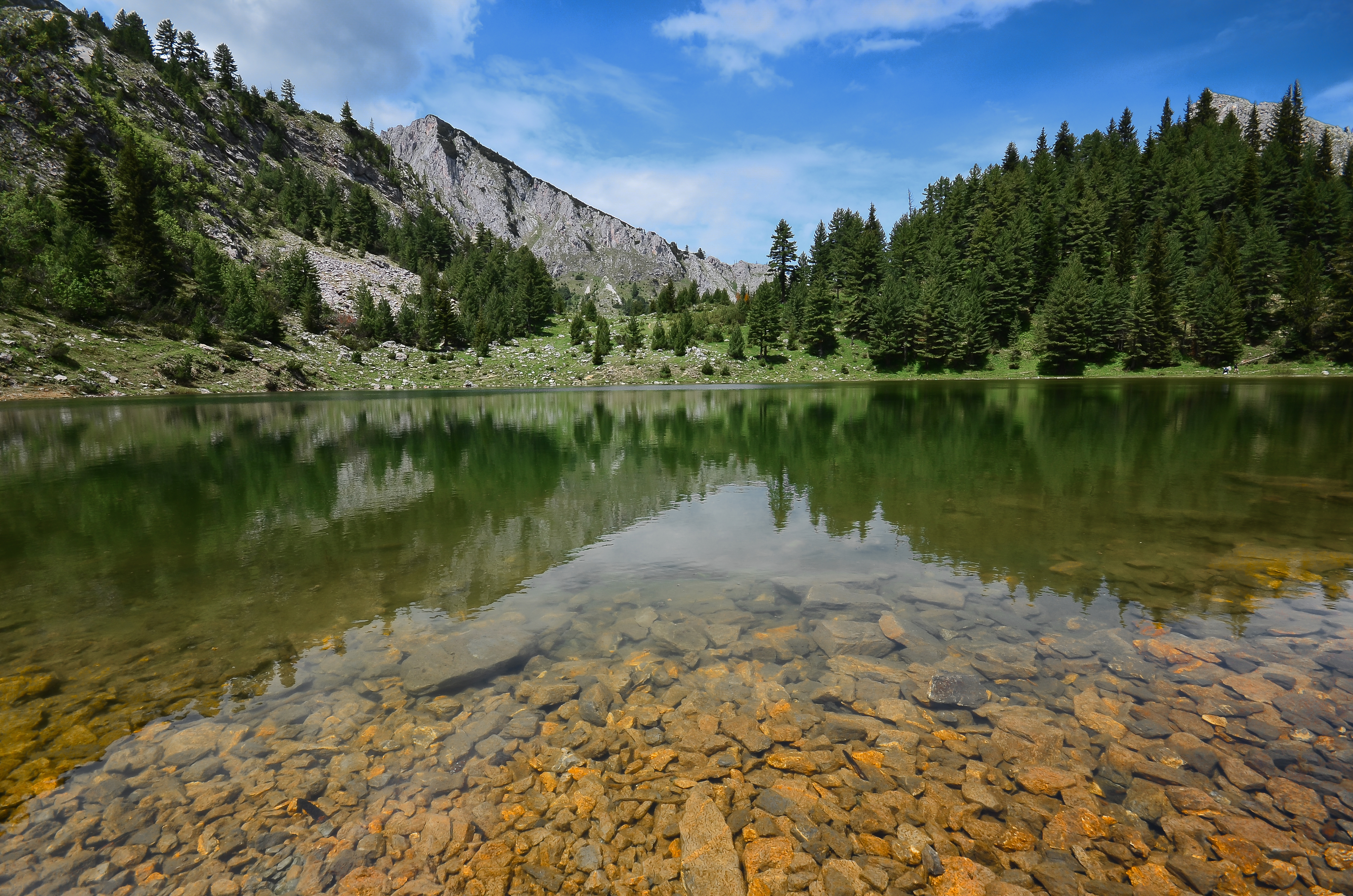
The Lake of Leqinat within the Bjeshkët e Nemuna National Park in the west of Kosovo

A landlocked country, there are several notable rivers and lakes within the country's borders. The drainage basin of the Black Sea comprises 50.7 percent of the territory of the country and totals 5,520 square kilometres (2,130 sq mi), which makes it the largest in Kosovo. The main rivers in the section of the country of the river basin are the rivers of Ibar and Sitnica.

In contrast, 43.5 percent of the country's territory is encompassed by the drainage basin of the Adriatic Sea. The area includes the largest rivers flowing in the country, the White Drin with its tributaries Erenik and Lumbardhi i Deçanit. The rest belongs to the Aegean Sea drainage basin, where the largest river by far is the Lepenac.

The Nerodime river is of particular significance because it represents Europe's only instance of a river bifurcation flowing into two seas, the Black and Aegean Sea. The bifurcation of the river is considered to be an artificial phenomenon, but created under extremely favorable natural conditions.

A number of natural lakes are located in the mountain ranges at various altitudes amongst them the Gjeravica, Leqinat, Jazhincë, and Zemra. Kosovo also does have a large number of karst springs, thermal and mineral water springs.

The main lakes are Gazivoda Lake (380 million m^{3}) in the north-western part, Radoniq lake (113 million m^{3}) in the south-western part, Batllava Lake (40 million m^{3}) and Badovc Lake (26 million m^{3}) in the north-eastern part. Other smaller scenic lakes include Zemra Lake, Gjervica Lake and Liqenat Lake.

== Biodiversity ==
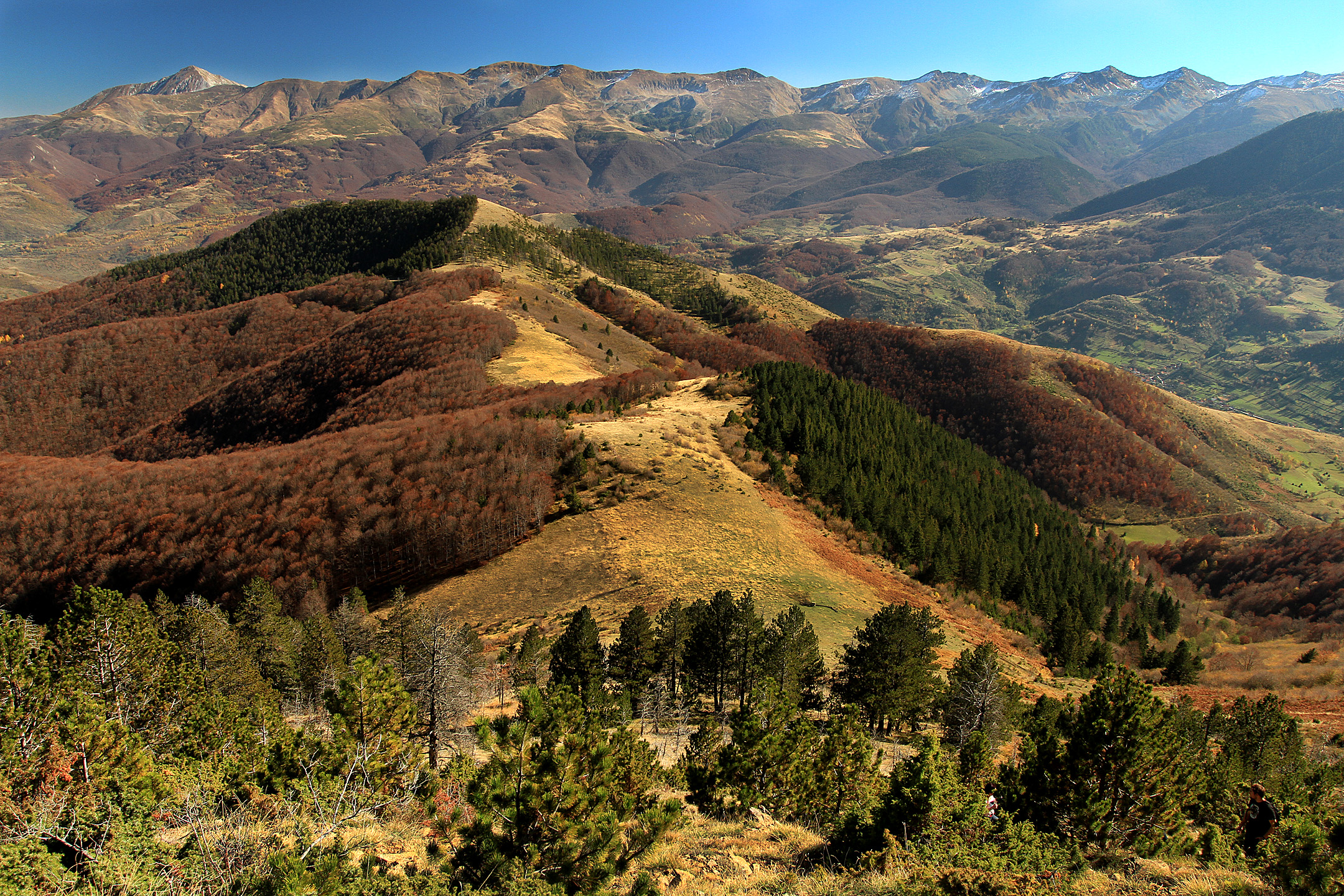
The Sharr Mountains National Park stretches in the southeast.

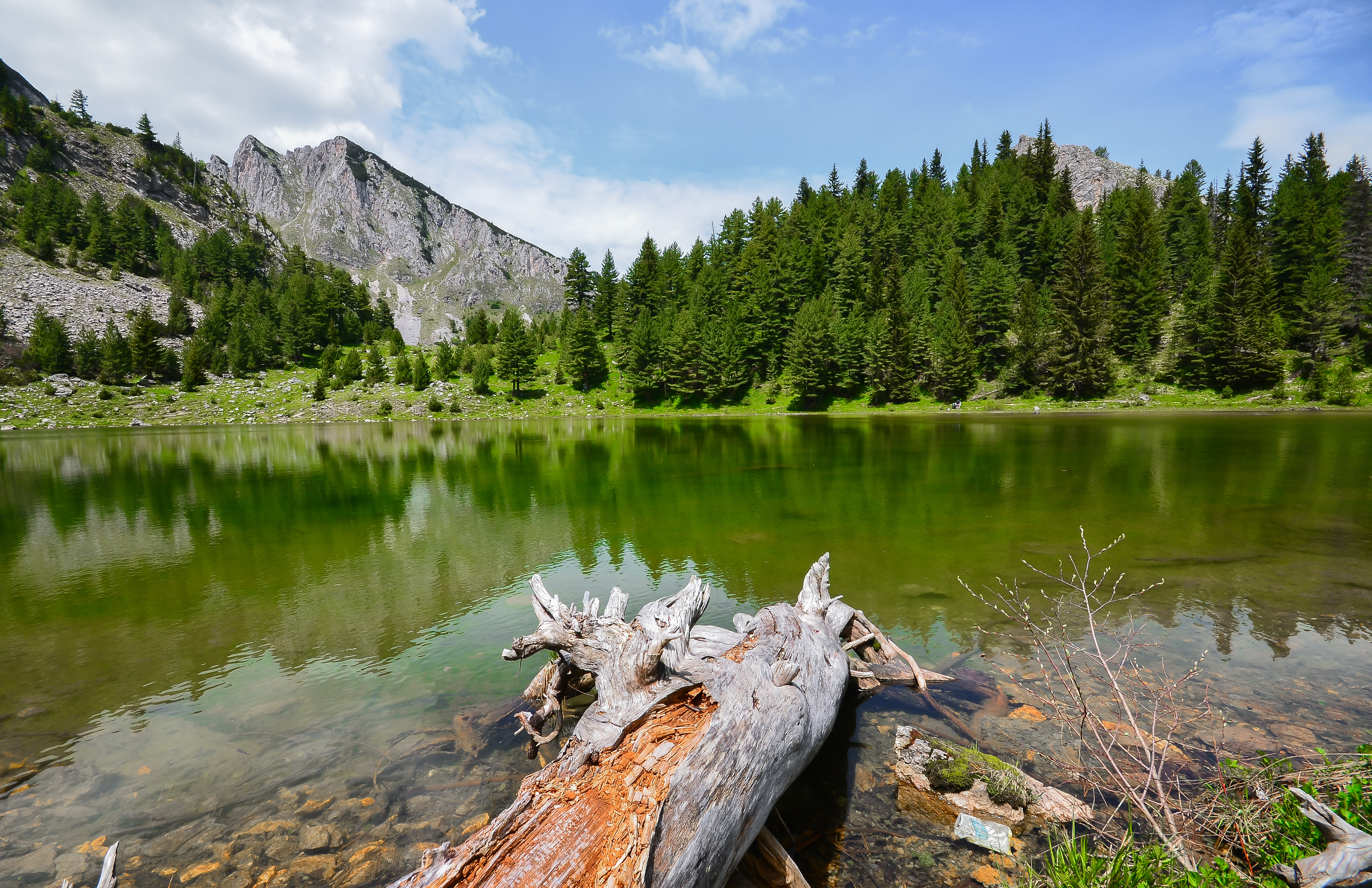
The Bjeshkët e Nemuna National Park stretches in the west.

Kosovo is characterised by a diverse biodiversity and an abundance of different ecosystems and habitats with a remarkable exponential value. It is located at the crossroads of several biogeographical regions and therefore has specific climate, geological, hydrological and morphological conditions.

In terms of phytogeography, the land area of Kosovo lies within the Boreal Kingdom, specifically within the Illyrian province of the Circumboreal Region. Its territory can be conventionally subdivided into four terrestrial ecoregions of the Palearctic realm, amongst them the Balkan and Dinaric mixed forests.

Kosovo is particularly rich in remote and mountainous landscapes endowed with forests. They are home to a large number of the country's animal species, including many endangered species. Kosovo is one of the rare countries in Europe with populations of rare species, the golden eagle, the brown bear, the grey wolf and the lynx.

The country has only two designated national parks. The Bjeshkët e Nemuna National Park in western and southwestern Kosovo is the largest national park by area in the country. The park encompasses 63,028 hectares (630.28 km^{2}) of the mountainous region of the Albanian Alps. The Sharr Mountains National Park was established to protect the spectacular scenery of southeastern Kosovo. It includes the country's section of the Sharr Mountains that cuts across the landscape along the border between Kosovo and North Macedonia.

== Climate ==
Kosovo is located between the Mediterranean Sea and mountainous regions of Southeast Europe, on the Balkan Peninsula. This geographic location gives the country its large annual temperature range. Summer temperature highs can reach 30 °C (86 °F), winter's temperatures as low as −10 °C (14 °F). According to the Strahler classification map the climate in Kosovo is considered moist continental. The country experiences warm summers and cold and snowy winters.

The climatic area of the Ibar valley is influenced by continental air masses. For this reason, in this part of the region, the winters are colder with medium temperatures above −10 °C (14 °F), but sometimes down to −26 °C (−15 °F). The summers are very hot with average temperatures of 20 °C (68 °F), sometimes up to 37 °C (99 °F). This area is characterized by a dry climate and a total annual precipitation of 600 mm per year, approximately. The climatic area of Dukagjin, which includes the watershed of the White Drin river, is influenced very much by the hot air masses, which cross the Adriatic Sea. Medium temperatures during winter range from 0.5 °C (32.9 °F) to sometimes 22.8 °C (73.0 °F). The average annual precipitation of this climatic area is about 700 mm (28 in) per year. The winter is characterized by heavy snowfalls. The climatic area of the mountains and forest parts is characterized by a typical forest clime, that is associated with heavy rainfalls (900 to 1,300 millimetres (35 to 51 in) per year), and summers that are very short and cold, and winters that are cold and with a lot of snow. Finally, it can be stated that the Kosovo territory is characterized by a sunny climate with variable temperature and humidity conditions.

== Extreme points ==
=== Elevation ===
- Highest point: Gjeravica, at 2,656 m (8,714 ft), 42°32′1″N 20°08′24″E, Deçan, District of Peja
- Lowest point: White Drin Valley near the border with Albania, at 297 m (974 ft), 42°9′45.7″N 20°32′43″E, Vërmicë, Prizren

== See also ==
- Biodiversity of Kosovo
- Climate of Kosovo
- Forests of Kosovo
