= List of lakes of Kosovo =

Kosovo is home to five large lakes. The largest of these is Gazivoda Lake, in the north-western part of Kosovo in the municipality of Zubin Potok. These are five of the largest lakes in Kosovo:

	Lake	Area (km^{2})	Altit. (m)	Depth (m)	(Million m^{3})	Type	Characteristics
1.	Gazivoda Lake	9.2	693	105	380	artificial	industrial reservoir (Ibar River)
2.	Radoniq Lake	5.06	455	30	113	artificial	industrial reservoir (Sosnica)
3.	Lake Batllava	3.07	600	35	40	artificial	industrial reservoir (Batllava)
4.	Badovc Lake	1.7		29	26	artificial	industrial reservoir (Gračanka)
5.	Fierza Reservoir	2.46	295	128		artificial	hydroelectric reservoir (Drin River)
6.	Mitrovica Lake	1.82	506	4		artificial	

- Gazivoda Lake is shared between Kosovo and Serbia. The total area of the lake is 11.9 km^{2}, while Serbia has less than one fourth of it (2.7 km^{2}).
- Fierza Lake is shared between Kosovo and Albania. The total area of the lake is 73 km^{2}, while Kosovo only encompasses 2.46 km^{2} of it.

== Other lakes ==
Other, smaller lakes are to be found in Kosovo as well. These four lakes are located in the west and are all fed by tributaries of the South Morava:

- Përlepnicë Lake
- Livoç Lake
- Ruboc Lake
- Tropojë Lake

Many smaller beautiful lakes are found on the mountains (Accursed Mountains and Šar Mountains). Leqinat lake and Little Liqenat Lake are found on Liqenat mountain, Zemra Lake and Gjeravica Lake are found near the peak of Gjeravica and Guri i Kuq Lake in the Rugova canyon, on the Guri i Kuq peak.

Konjushka's Lake is the highest lake in the Šar Mountains.
