= Bjeshkët e Nemuna National Park =

National park in western Kosovo

- IUCN category II (national park)
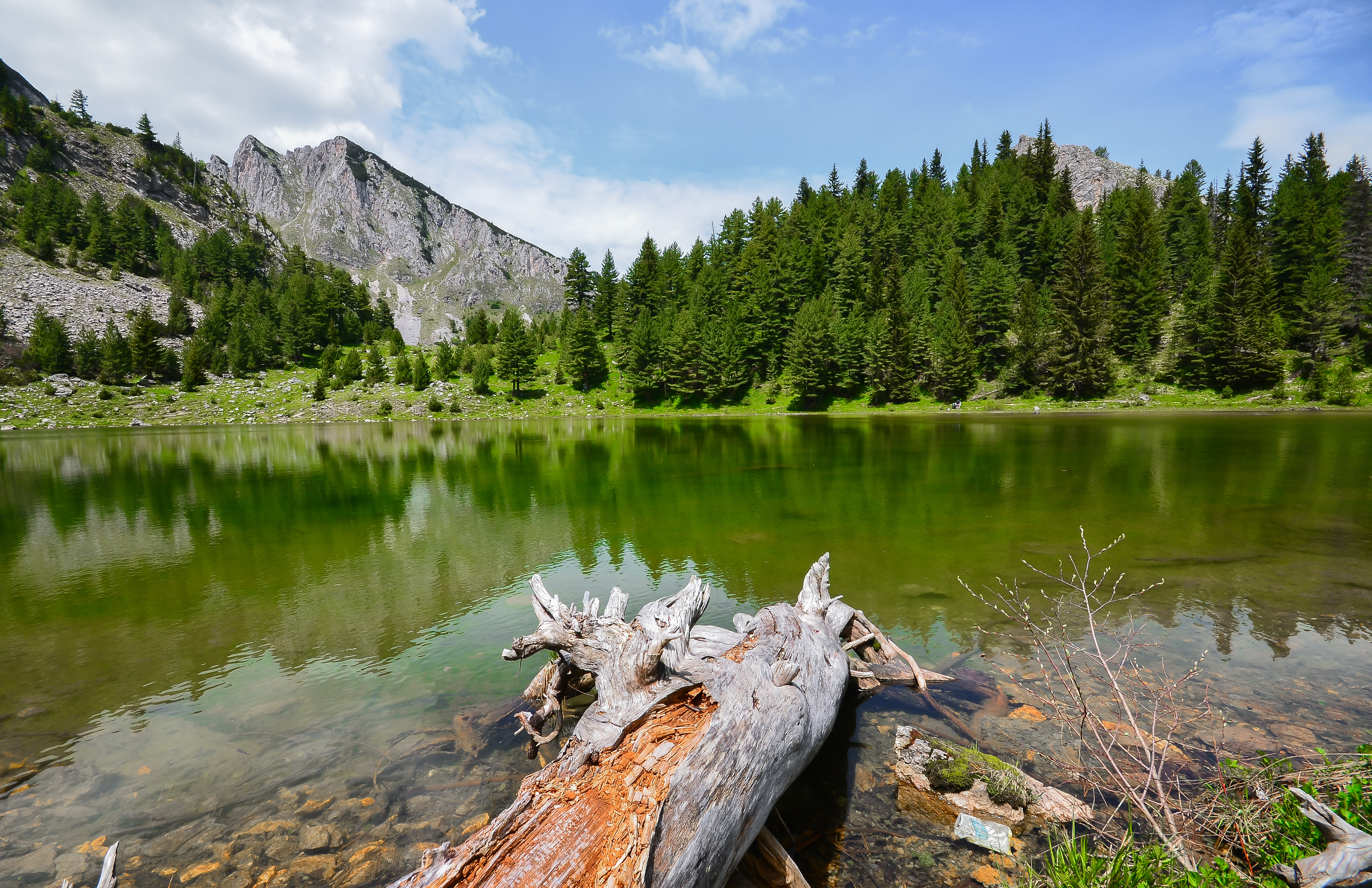
- Lake Liqenat

- Location within Kosovo
- Location: District of Peja
- Nearest city: Peja, Deçan, Junik
- Coordinates: 42°40′0″N 20°10′0″E
- Area: 63,028 hectares (630.28 km^{2})
- Established: 13 December 2012
- Governing body: Ministry of Environment Kosovo

Bjeshkët e Nemuna National Park (Albanian: Parku Kombëtar Bjeshkët e Nemuna, Serbian: Nacionalni park Prokletije / Национални парк Проклетије) is a national park in the districts of Gjakovë and Pejë in western Kosovo. It encompasses 63,028 hectares (630.28 km^{2}) of mountainous terrain, with numerous lakes, dense deciduous and coniferous forests and alpine landscapes. The park was established to protect its ecosystems and biodiversity, as well as the cultural and historical heritage. It borders the Alps of Albania National Park in Albania to the south.

The International Union for Conservation of Nature (IUCN) has listed the park as Category II. Notably, the park has been recognised as an important bird area of international importance by designation under the BirdLife International Convention.

The Accursed Mountains are the southernmost geological continuation of the Dinaric Alps. The portion within the country's territory extends approximately 26 km (16 mi) from east to west, and 50 km (31 mi) from north to south. Rising to an elevation of 2,656 m (1.650 mi), the Gjeravica mountain peak is the second highest natural point of the mountain range, as well as in the country.

== Biology and ecology ==
The wide range of elevations and rugged topography of the mountains has created favorable conditions for a diverse vegetation and biodiversity.

=== Fauna ===
Large mammals such as wildcats, chamoises, roe deers, grey wolves, as well as rare or endangered species like lynxes and brown bears can be found within the forests of the park. A high number of species of birds, more than a dozen fish species, and a few reptile and amphibian species have been reported. Almost 37 species of mammals, 148 species of birds, 10 species of reptiles, 13 species of amphibia and 129 species of butterflies have been documented within the boundaries of the park. In terms of phytogeography, the park falls within the Balkan mixed forests terrestrial ecoregion of the Palearctic temperate broadleaf and mixed forest. The flora is diverse and is characterized with high endemism. A total of over 1,000 plant species have been identified parkwide.

=== Flora ===
The vegetation is vertically divided into six distinct elevation zones. The oak forest zone, reaching approximately altitude of 800 metres, is dominated, among other by italian oak, austrian oak, and cornish oak. The beech forest zone can be found on the eastern part of the park at an altitude between 900 metres up to 1,320 metres. These include forests of silver fir, sycamore, south european flowering ash and bosnian pine. The mixed oak forest zone is mainly covered with silver fir, norway spruce and european hornbeam, between 1,200 and 1,540 metres. Within the dark coniferous forest zone, the most widespread floral communities of that type are dominated as well as by Bosnian pine, Macedonian pine and Norwegian spruce. The composition extends from an altitude between 1,540 metres up to 1,800 metres. The breeding of fir forests zone, lying at an altitude of 1850–1930 metres, is characterized by endemic species such as the Balkan pine. The shrub zone, at an altitude of 1850 to 2050 metres, is covered with grass, moss, lichen, and 55 species of herbaceous plants. The most common types include wood cranesbill, wild strawberry, willow gentian and wood forget-me-not.

== See also ==
- Biodiversity of Kosovo
- Geography of Kosovo
- National Parks of Kosovo
