= Zemra Lake =

Lake in Kosovo

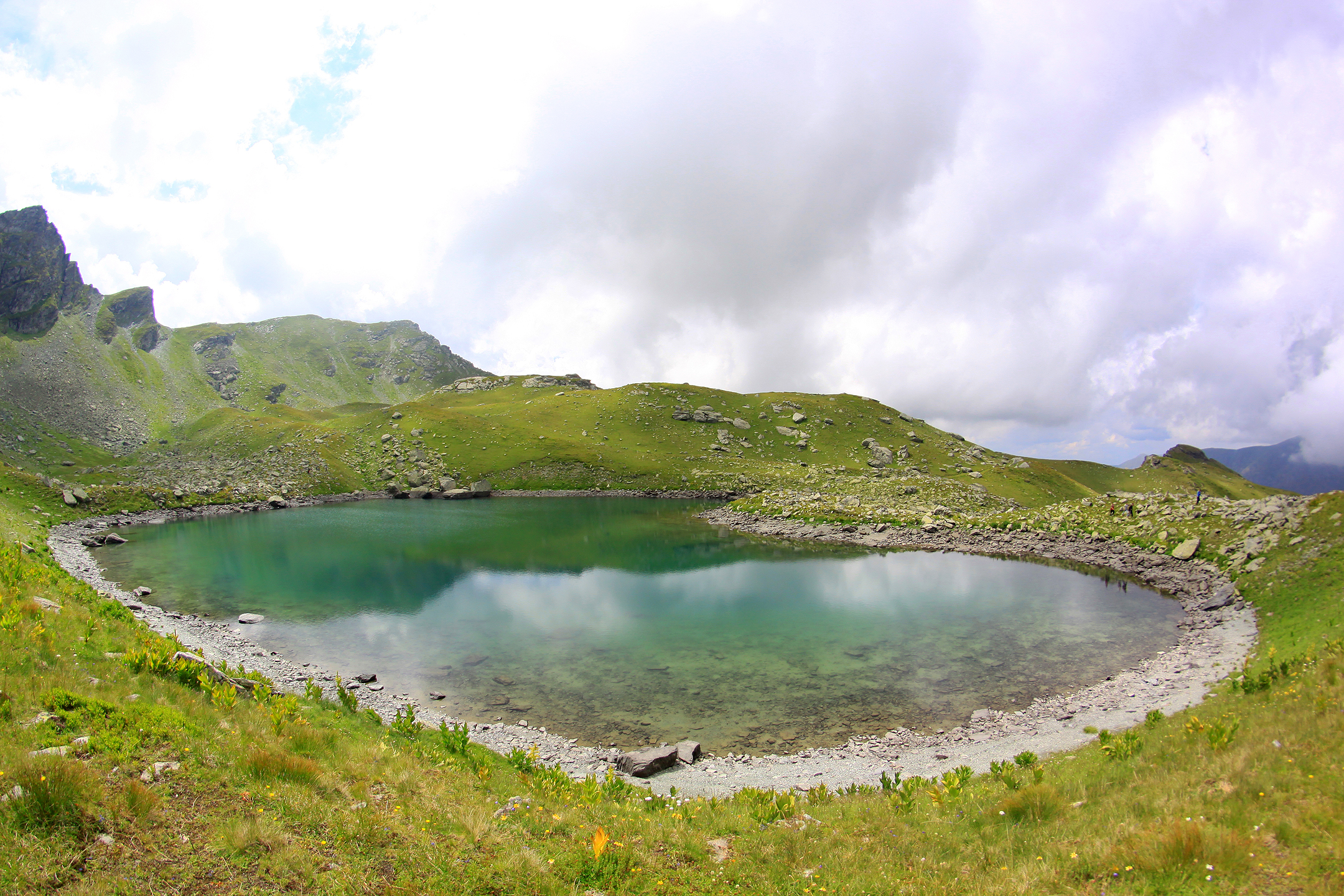
- The lake within the alps.

- Location within Kosovo Location within Europe
- Interactive map of Zemra Lake
- Location: Accursed Mountains; Kosovo, Southern Europe
- Coordinates: 42°31′49″N 20°07′14″E
- Max. length: 150 m (490 ft)
- Max. width: 120 m (390 ft)

The Zemra Lake (Albanian: Liqeni i Zemrës) is a lake in the western edge of the Republic of Kosovo. Roughly in shape of a heart, the lake stretches inside the Accursed Mountains, some 400 m (1,312 ft) away from Albania. It is situated between 2,200 and 2,500 metres of elevation above sea level on the northern slopes of Maja e Gusanit, near Maja e Gjeravicës.

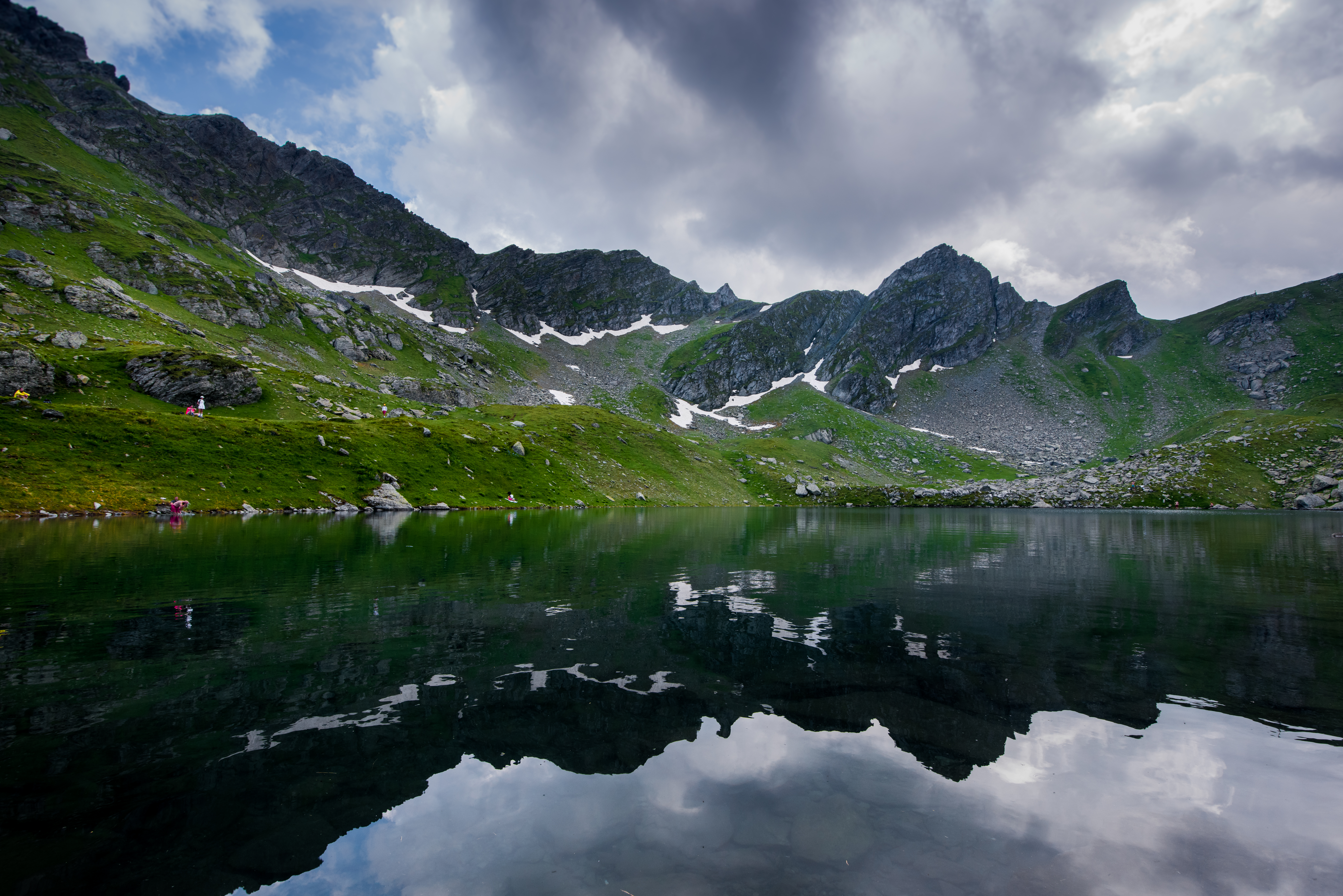

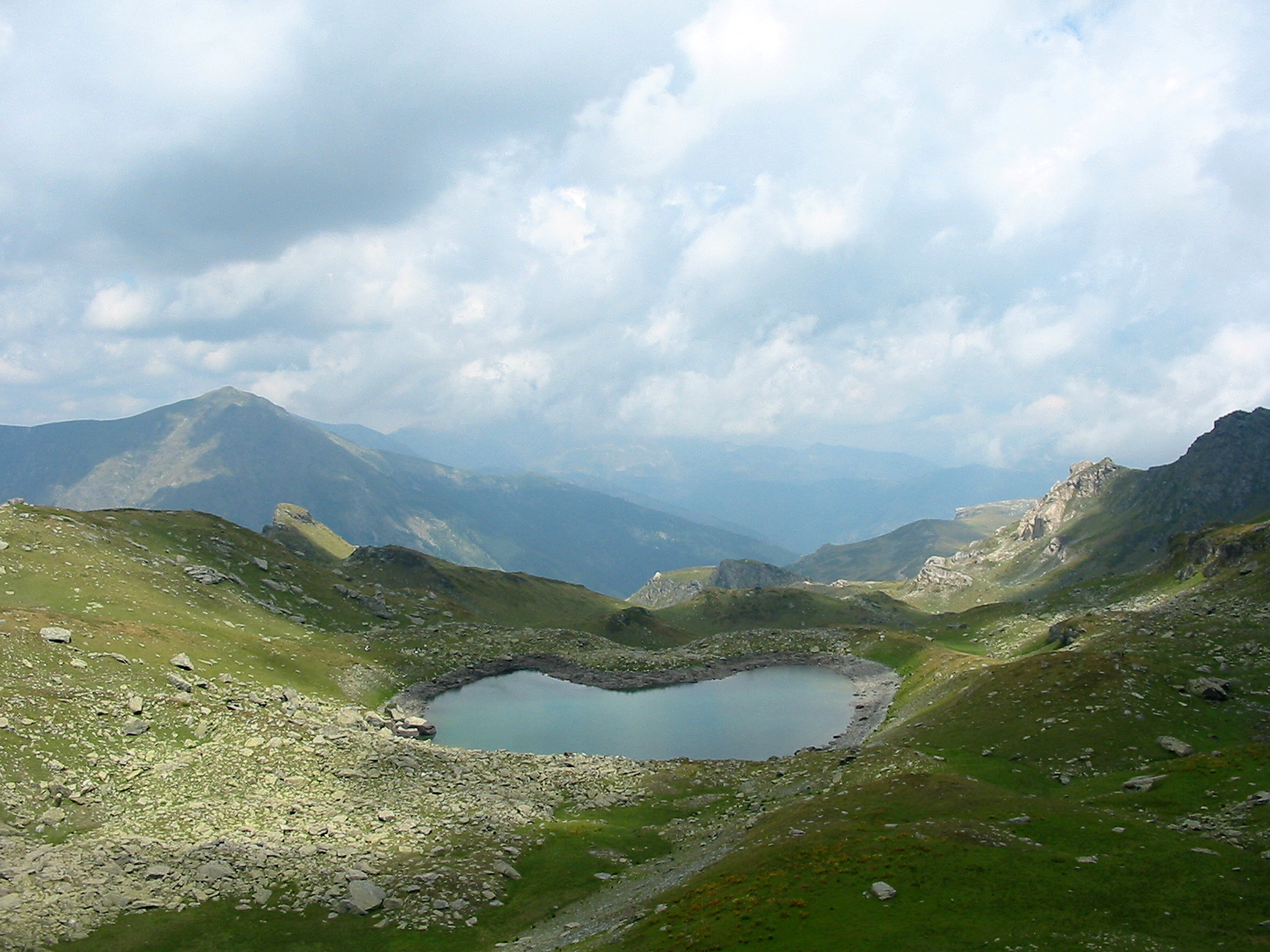

== See also ==
- Geography of Kosovo
- List of lakes in Kosovo
