= Livoç Lake =

Lake in Kosovo

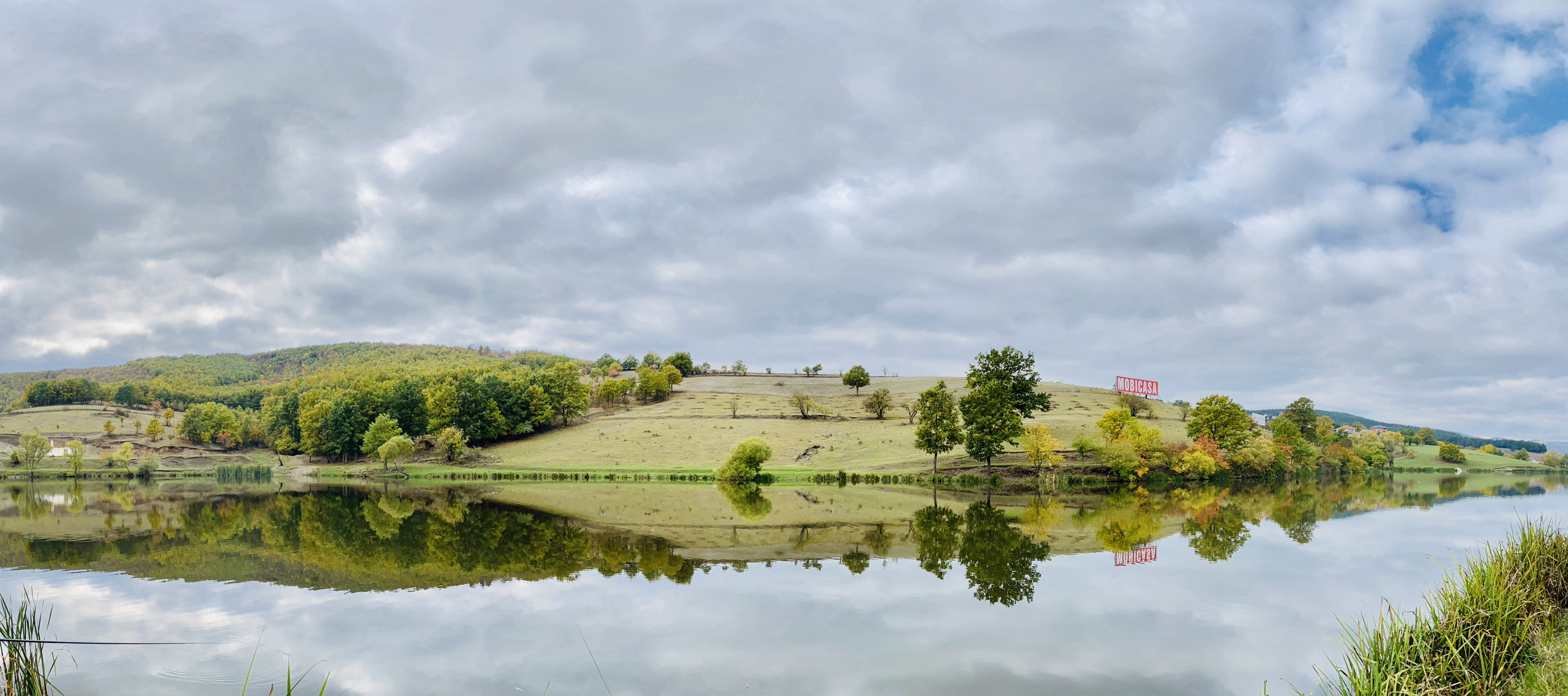
- Livoç Lake

- Location within Kosovo Location within Europe
- Interactive map of Livoç Lake
- Location: Near Gjilan, Kosovo
- Coordinates: 42°27′50″N 21°24′55″E
- Lake type: artificial lake
- Basin countries: Kosovo
- Max. length: 700 m (2,300 ft)
- Max. width: 200 m (660 ft)
- Surface area: 0.08 km^{2} (0.031 sq mi)
- Surface elevation: 565 m (1,854 ft)
- Islands: 0

Livoç Lake (Albanian: Liqeni i Livoçit; Serbian: Ливочко језеро/Livočko jezero) is a small artificial lake in eastern Kosovo. Livoç Lake is west of the city of Gjilan and borders the Gollak mountains to its west. The lake is fed by a small tributary of the South Morava. It is the second largest lake in the east of Kosovo only coming second to Përlepnicë Lake.

== See also ==
- List of lakes of Kosovo
