= Guri i Kuq Lake =

Lake in Kosovo

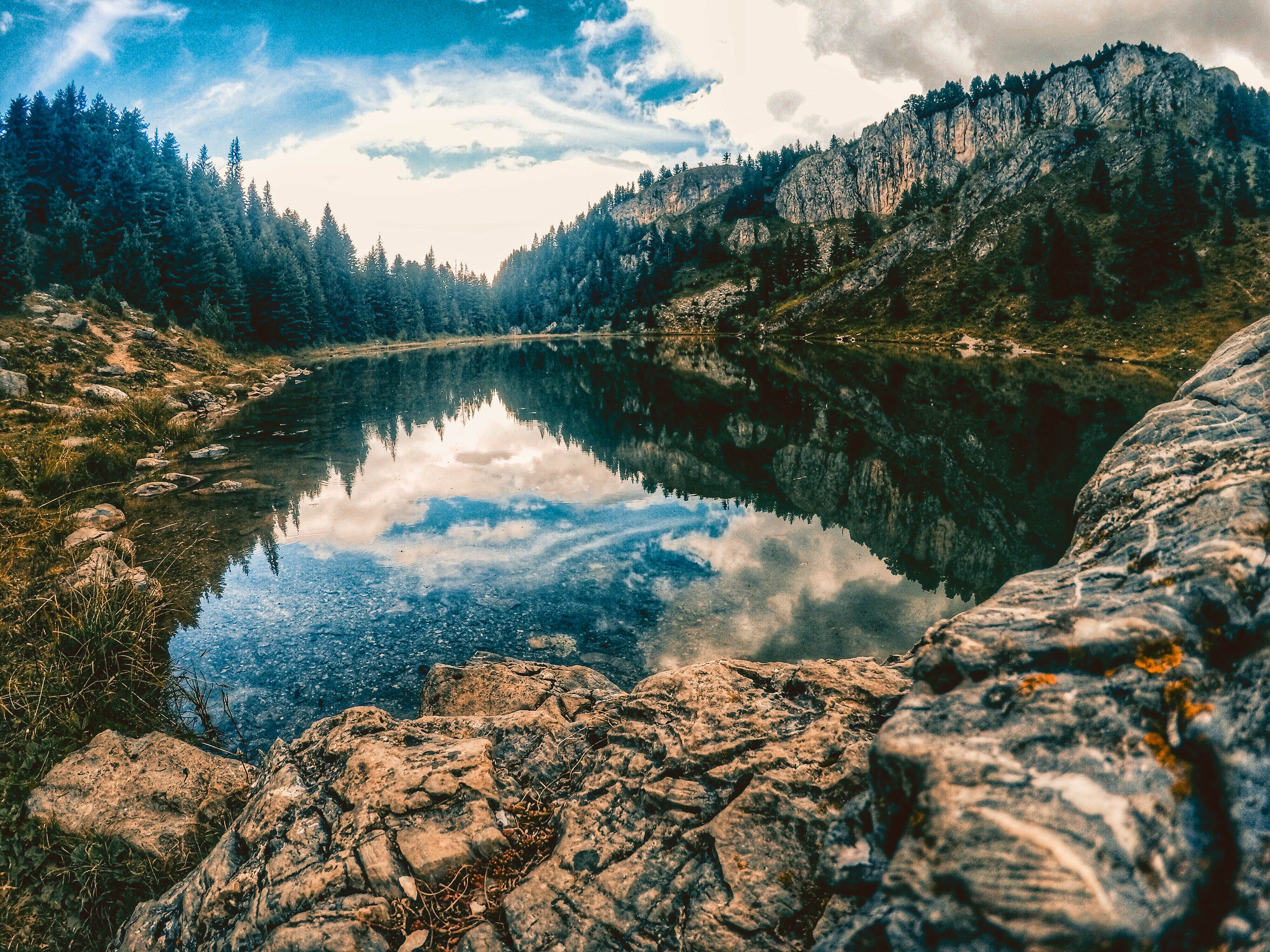
- In the distance is the Hajla mountain (2,403 m (7,884 ft))

- Location within Kosovo Location within Europe
- Interactive map of Guri i Kuq Lake
- Location: Accursed Mountains
- Coordinates: 42°39′17″N 20°06′21″E
- Basin countries: Kosovo

The Guri i Kuq Lakes or Liqenet e Kuqishtes (Albanian: Liqeni i Gurit të Kuq, lit. 'Red Stone Lake'; Serbian: Језеро Жути камен, romanized: Jezero Žuti kamen, lit. 'Yellow Stone Lake') are glacial lakes in Kosovo, located on the Guri i Kuq mountain, in the Accursed Mountains range.

They are the largest lakes in the Kosovan part of the range after Gjeravica Lake and Liqenat Lake. Unlike Liqenat Lake, the Guri i Kuq lake is not surrounded by trees but instead by large meadows. Just north of the lake is the Rugova Canyon.

== See also ==
- Guri i Kuq
- List of lakes of Kosovo
