= Gusani =

Mountain peak in Albania and Kosovo

- Location within Kosovo

Highest point
- Elevation: 2,539 m (8,330 ft)
- Coordinates: 42°31′32″N 20°07′19″E

Geography
- Location: Albania and Kosovo
- Parent range: Accursed Mountains

Gusani is a summit located on the border of Albania and Kosovo. At 2,539 m (8,330 ft) high, it is the highest mountain that is shared between the two. This mountain belongs to the Accursed Mountains range. It is connected by a ridge to Gjeravica in Kosovo, which is only a few kilometers south from it.

Maja e Gusanit is the seventh highest peak of Kosovo. According to Serbia's claim that Kosovo is part of Serbia, that country considers Gusan also the seventh highest peak of Serbia.
