= Ruboc Lake =

Lake in Kosovo

- Location within Kosovo Location within Europe
- Interactive map of Ruboc Lake
- Location: Mountains of Gollak
- Coordinates: 42°34′17″N 21°32′29″E
- Basin countries: Kosovo

Ruboc Lake (Albanian: Liqeni i Rubocit, Serbian: Језеро Robovac) is a very small lake in Kosovo. Robovac Lake is completely surrounded by the mountains of Gollak. It is the smallest lake in eastern Kosovo being about the same size as an average mountain lake.

== See also ==
- List of lakes of Kosovo
