= Tropojë Lake =

Lake in Kosovo

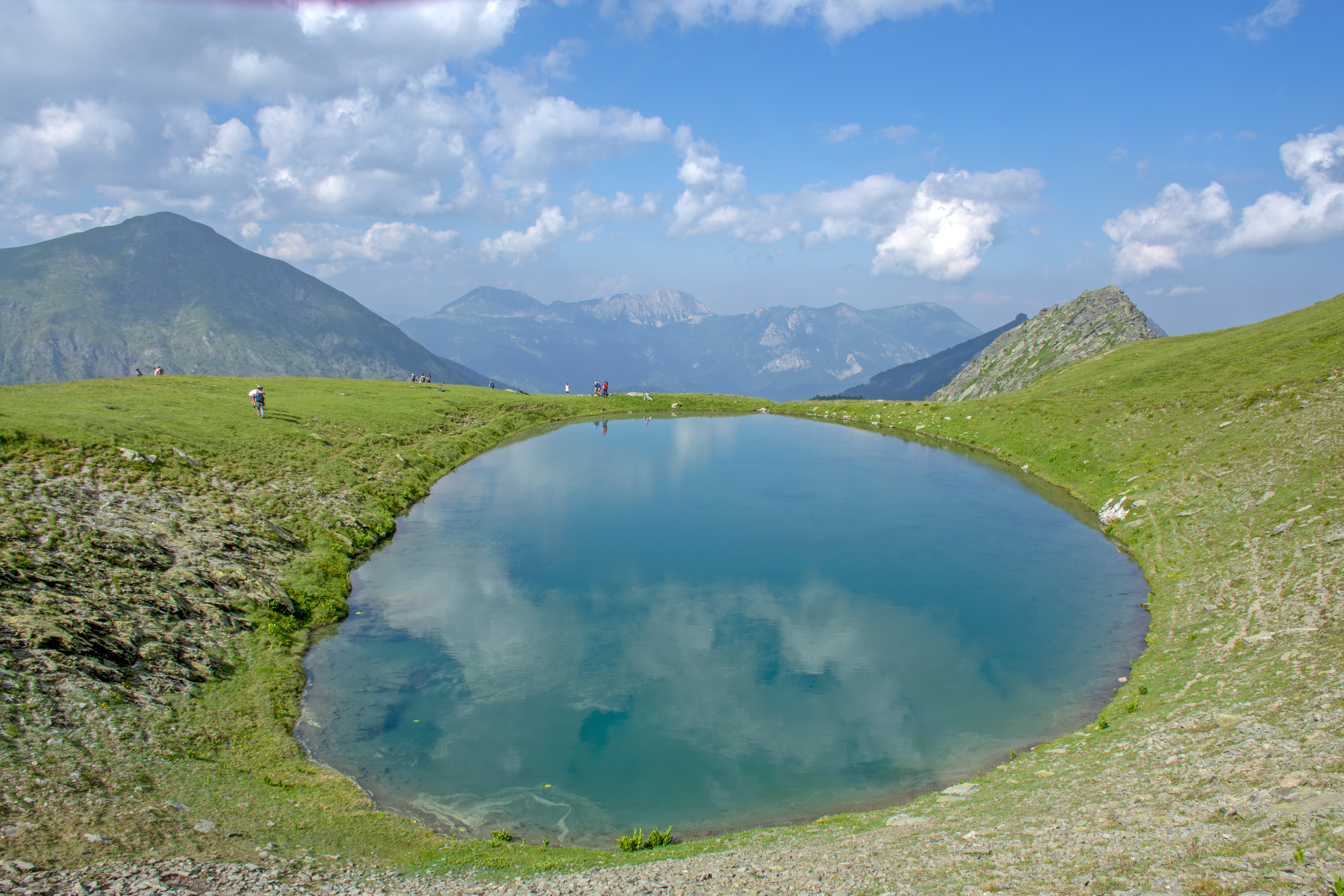
- Tropojë lake and the surrounding landscape

- Location within Kosovo Location within Albania Location within Europe
- Interactive map of Tropojë Lake
- Location: Accursed Mountains
- Coordinates: 42°32′46″N 20°05′35″E
- Basin countries: Kosovo
- Max. length: 100 m (330 ft)

Tropojë Lake (Albanian: Liqeni i Tropojës) is a small mountain lake in the Accursed Mountains in western Kosovo, only 180m from the Albanian border. The lake has an oval shape and is 100 m (330 ft) in length and 40 m (130 ft) in width. Rivers that originate on this lake flow downwards to join larger rivers and then finally flow into the White Drin.

== See also ==
- List of lakes of Kosovo
