= Junik Mountains =

Mountains on the border between Albania and Kosovo

Coordinates: 42°30′10″N 20°10′42″E

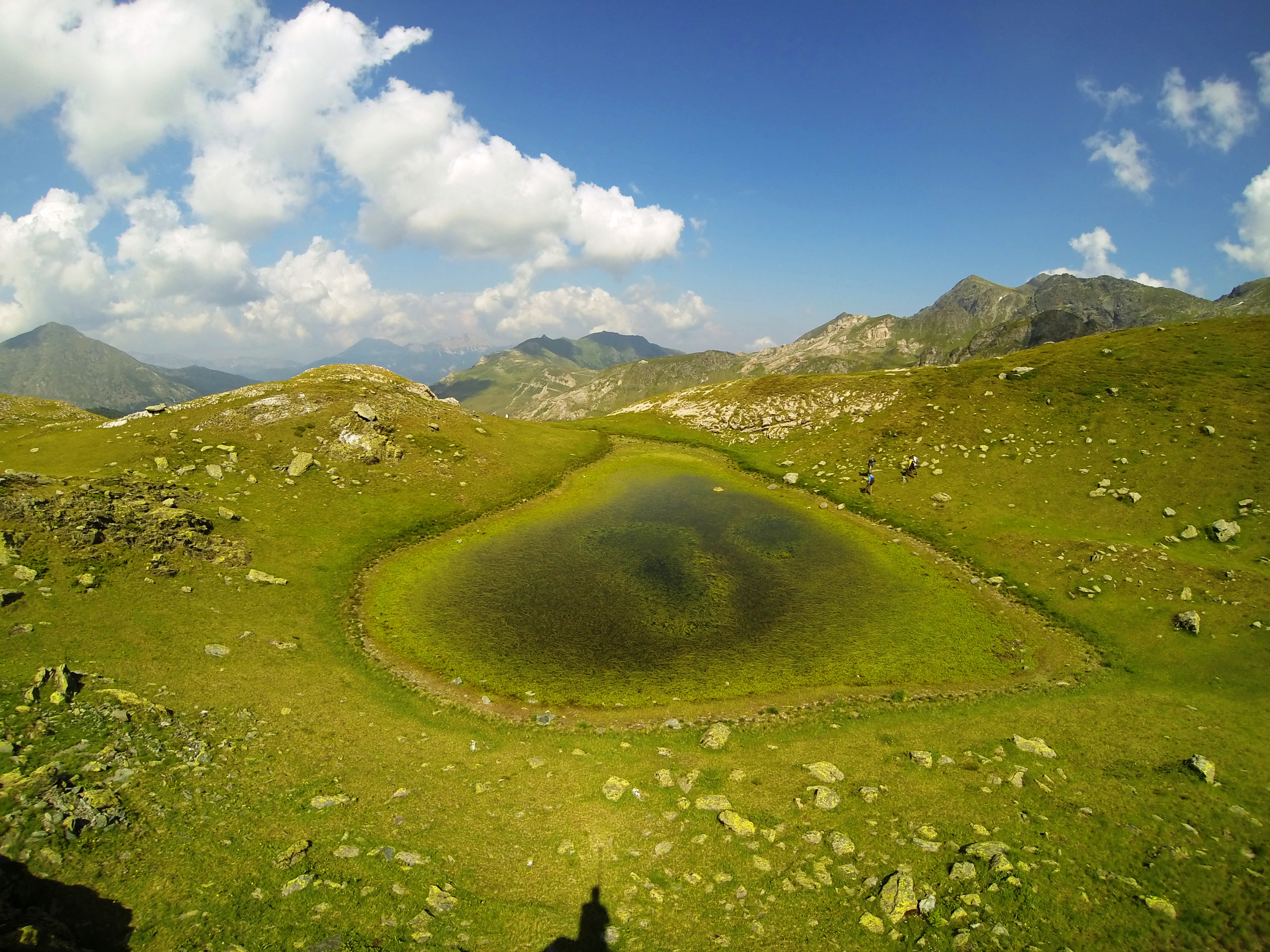
Lake at Junik Mountains

The Junik Mountains (Albanian: Bjeshkët e Junikut, Serbo-Croatian: Јуничке Планине / Juničke Planine), part of the Accursed Mountains, are on the border between Albania and Kosovo. They reach a height of 2,280 m (7,480 ft). On the Kosovo side is the Dukagjin region, some 8.5 km (5 mi) to the north-west of the Junik commune. Moronica Park, in southwestern Kosovo, marks the beginning of the Junik Mountains. The 1999 Battle of Košare was fought along the slopes of the Junik and Accursed Mountains.
