= Strahler =

Strahler is a surname. Notable people with the surname include:

- Arthur Newell Strahler (1918–2002), American geoscience professor
- Mike Strahler (1947–2016), American baseball player
- Adolf Straehler (1829–1897), sometimes Adolf Strähler, Silesier forester and botanist

== See also ==
- Strahler number
