= Erenik =

River in Kosovo

Erenik Ribnik
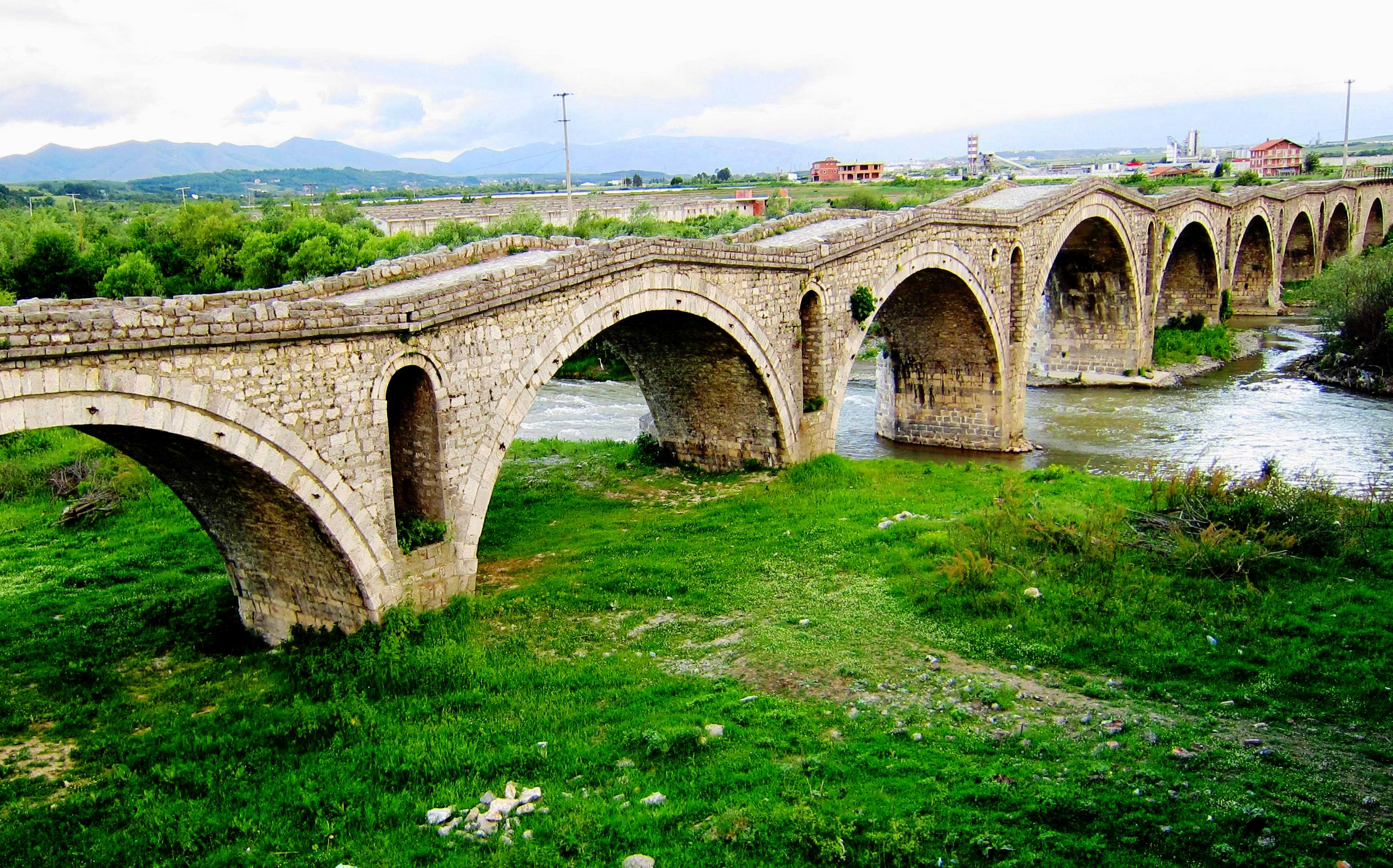
- Erenik
- Native name: Ereniku (Albanian); Ереник (Serbian)

Location
- Country: Kosovo

Physical characteristics
- Source
  - location: Gjeravica, Accursed Mountains, Kosovo
- Mouth
  - location: White Drin, east of Gjakova, Kosovo
  - coordinates: 42.3641°N 20.5266°E
- Length: 51 km (32 mi)
- Basin size: 516 km^{2} (199 sq mi)

Basin features
- Progression: White Drin→ Drin→ Adriatic Sea
- Cities: Junik, Gjakova

The Erenik (Albanian definite form: Ereniku, Serbian Cyrillic: Ереник), or Ribnik (Serbian Cyrillic: Рибник), is a river in Kosovo. Located in the west of the country, the 51 km (32 mi)-long Erenik is a right tributary to the White Drin.

The Erenik originates near the Albanian border, on the northern slopes of the Junik Mountains, a part of the Accursed Mountains, under the Gjeravica peak (2,656 m or 8,714 ft), the highest mountain in Kosovo. The river flows to the south and south-east, following the eastern edge of the Accursed Mountains, dividing them from the western region.

Before passing through Gjakova, there is a string of settlements, including the villages of Berjah, Stubëll, Nivokaz, Popoc, Shishman, and Ponoshec, the small town of Junik and the village and mine of Babaj i Bokës. It receives many streams from the right, flowing down from the Accursed Mountains (most notably, Shlepica and Reqica), but the Erenik's major tributaries are from its western side (Trava and Lumbardhi i Lloqanit).

After Gjakova, the Erenik flows beside the villages of Raçë and Bishtazhin, soon emptying into the White Drin near the village and hill of Pogragja. The river formed an epigene gallery feature called Ura e Fshejtë in the hill. The river valley in this final section serves as a part of the route of the Peja-Gjakova-Prizren road.

The Erenik belongs to the Adriatic Sea drainage basin, draining an area of 516 km^{2} (199 sq mi). It is not navigable.

== History ==
=== Kosovo War ===
From 24 March to 12 May, the Kosovo Liberation Army under Ramush Haradinaj had launched an offensive to capture villages in the Erenik Valley, and multiple villages east of Dečani to drive out the local Serbs and Yugoslav security forces. In the Erenik region, the KLA captured the villages of Hulaj, Smolica and Junik, while in the area east of Dečani, the KLA captured the villages Glođane, Dašinovac and Babaloć.

== See also ==
- Terzi Bridge

== Bibliography ==
- Mala Prosvetina Enciklopedija, Third edition (1985); Prosveta; ISBN 86-07-00001-2
- Jovan Đ. Marković (1990): Enciklopedijski geografski leksikon Jugoslavije; Svjetlost-Sarajevo; ISBN 86-01-02651-6
