= Gjeravica Lake =

Lake in Kosovo

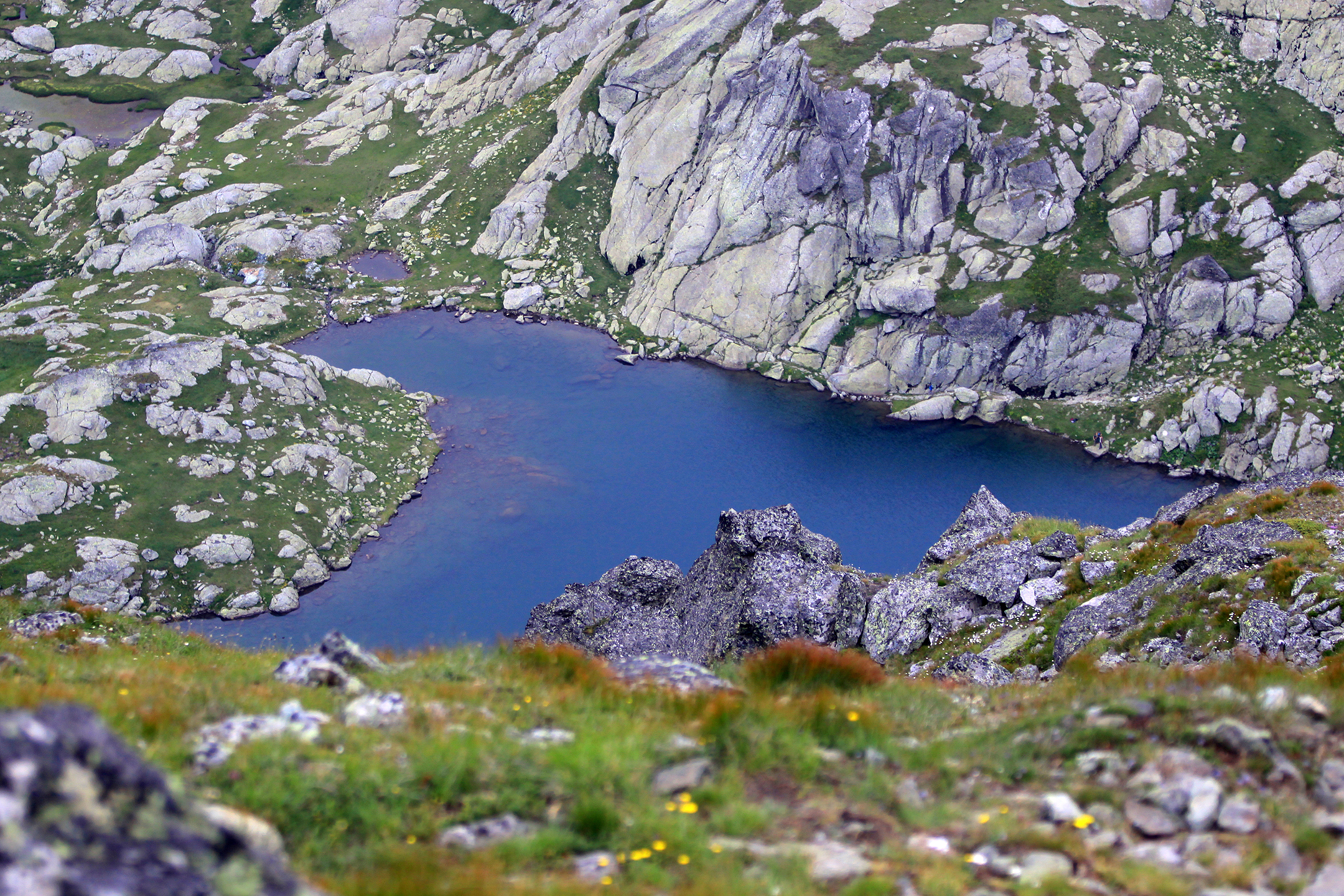
- Gjeravica lake

- Location within Kosovo Location within Europe
- Interactive map of Gjeravica Lake
- Location: Kosovo
- Coordinates: 42°31′51″N 20°8′6″E
- Primary outflows: Erenik
- Basin countries: Kosovo
- Max. length: 240 m (787 ft)
- Max. width: 120 m (394 ft)
- Surface area: 0.02(2 ha)
- Max. depth: 3.8 m (12 ft)
- Surface elevation: 2,200 m (7,200 ft)

Gjeravica Lake or Đeravica Lake (Albanian: Liqeni i Gjeravicës; Serbian: Језеро Ђеравица) is a mountain lake in Kosovo located just under the summit of Gjeravica mountain.

== Geography ==
The lake is about 2,200 m (7,218 ft) above sea level. It has an area of 2 hectares. The maximum length of this lake is 240 m (787 ft) and the width is 120 m (394 ft). The lake has a maximum depth of 3.8 m (12 ft). It is shaped like a tooth and is the origin of the Erenik river which flows down to the Metohija region of western Kosovo.

== Fauna ==
The lake is known for is its many salamanders, which feast on flying insects. The Lake contains many fish.

== Gallery ==
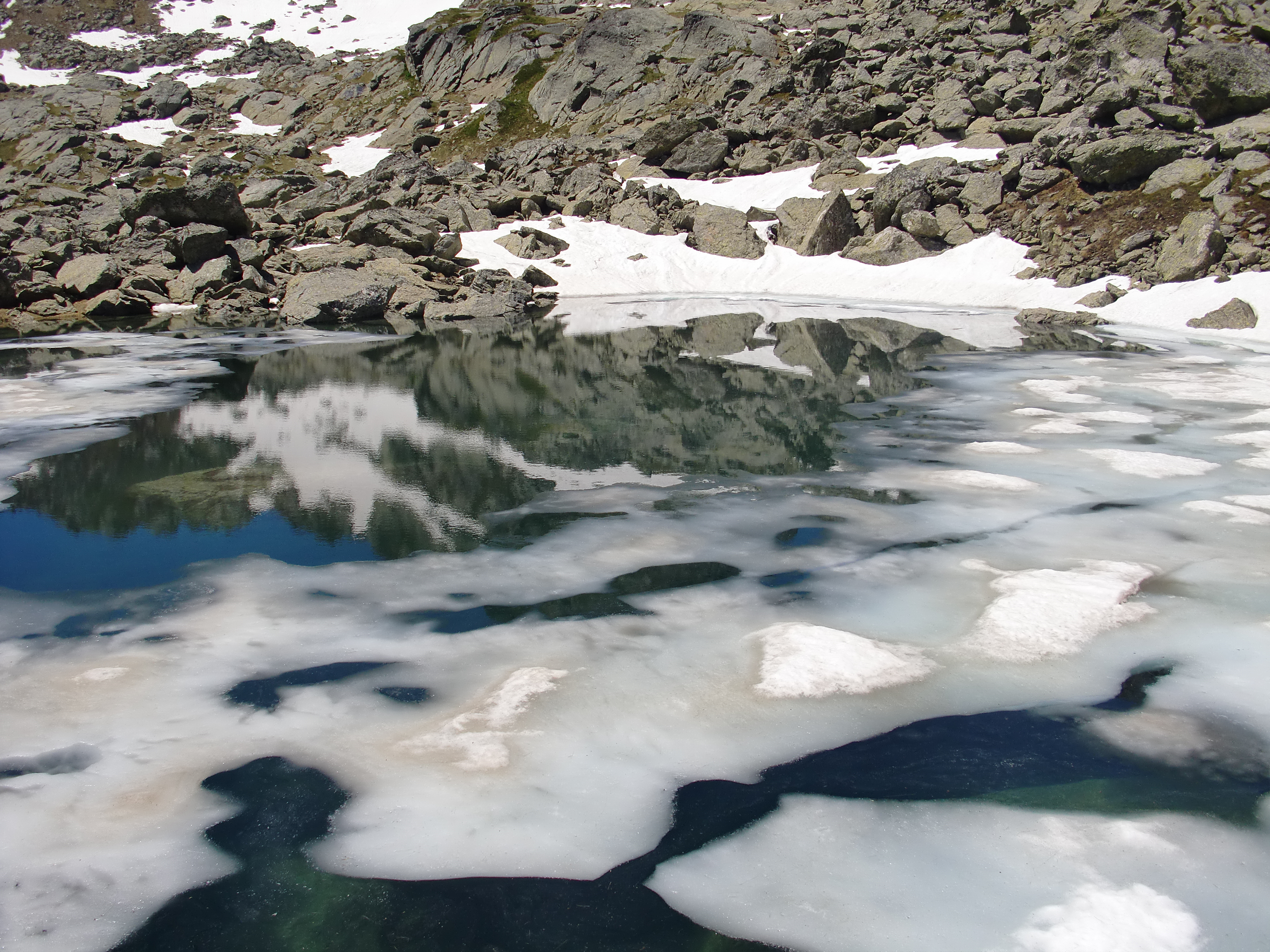

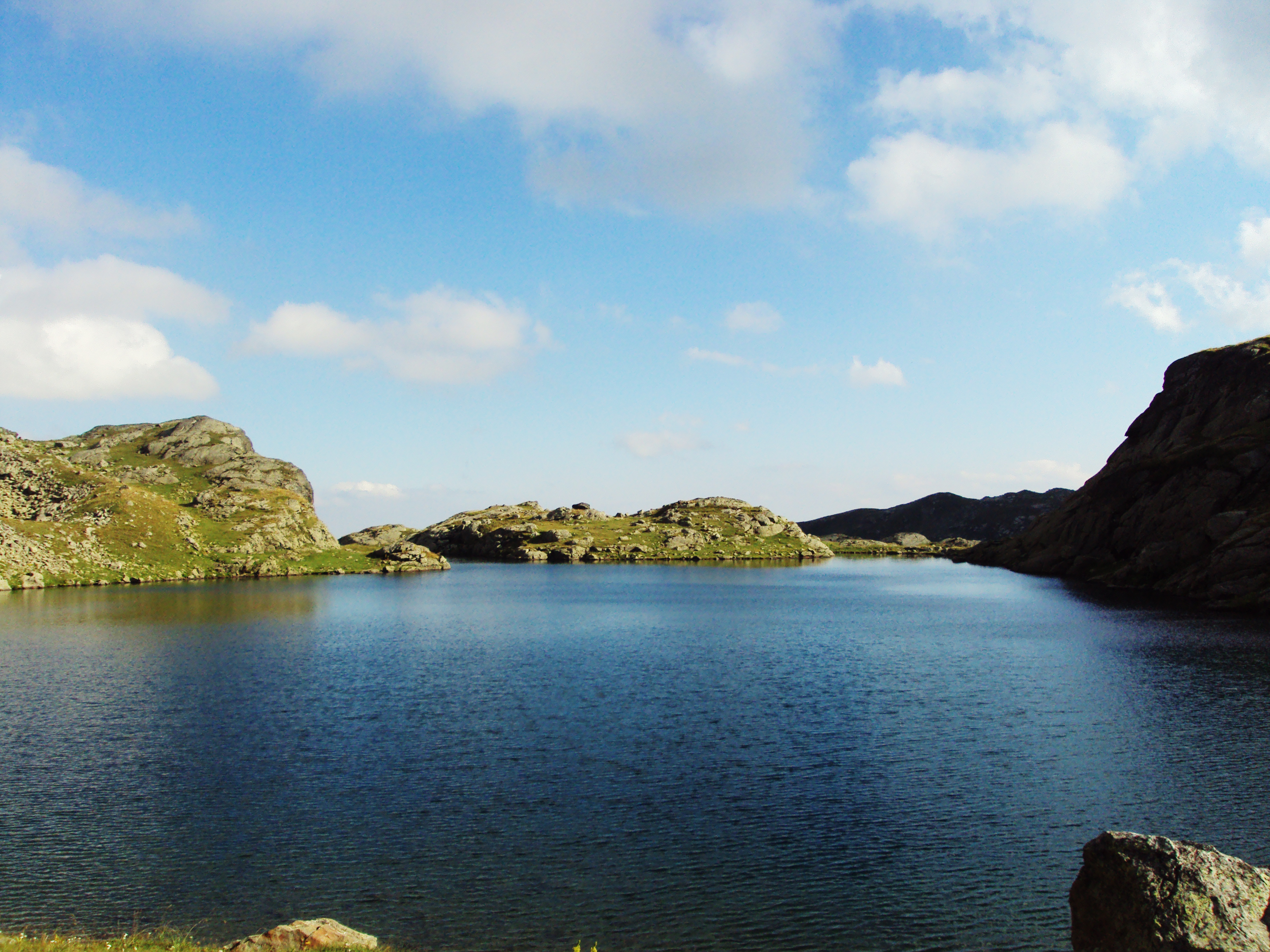

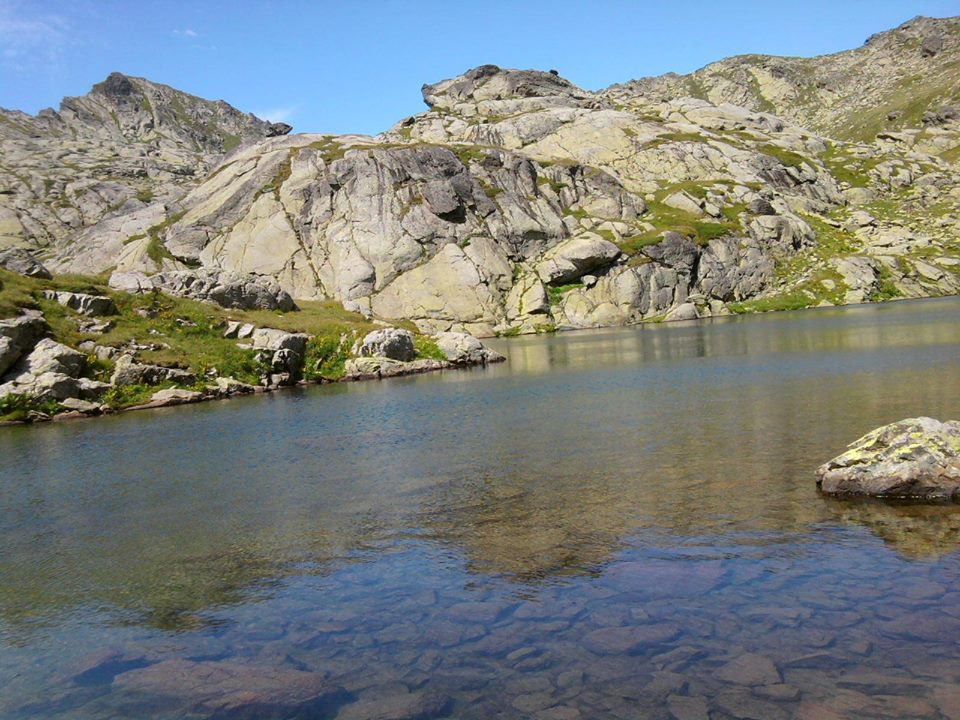

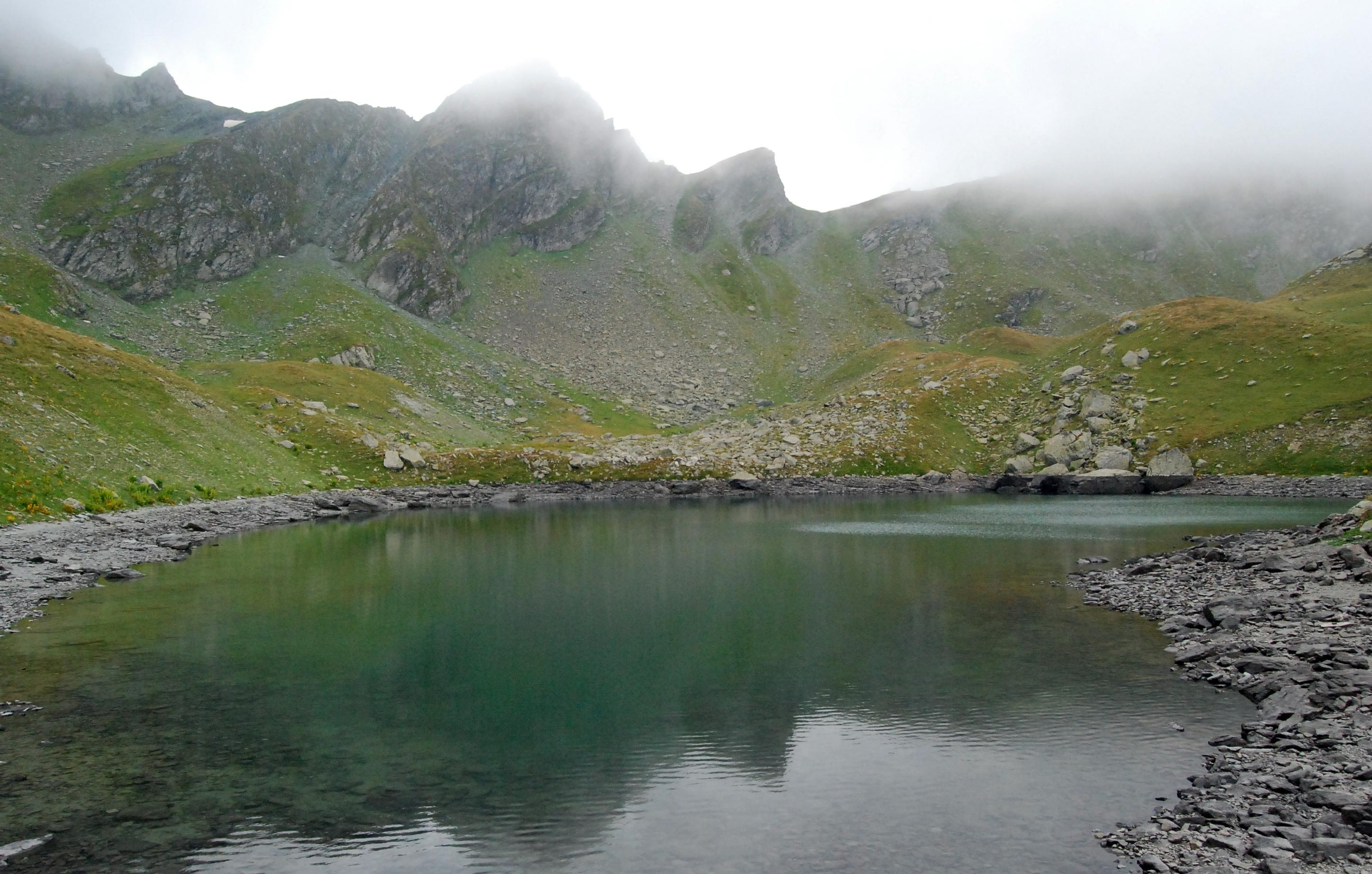

== See also ==
- List of lakes of Kosovo
