= Guri i Kuq =

Mountain in Kosovo

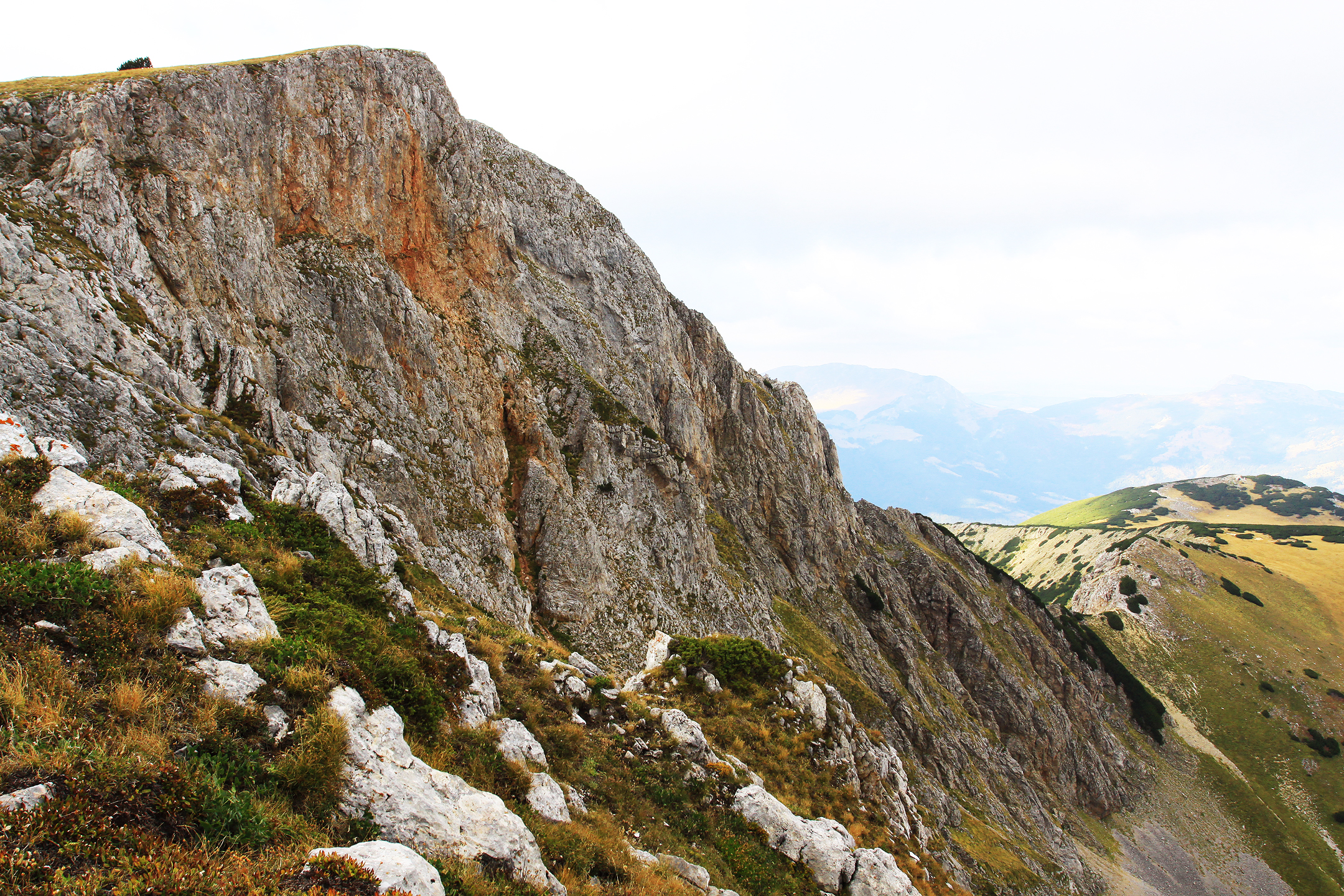
- Guri i Kuq, the highest summit in Rugova Gorge.

Highest point
- Elevation: 2,522 m (8,274 ft)
- Coordinates: 42°39′47″N 20°08′04″E

Geography
- Location within Kosovo Location within Balkans Location within Europe
- Country: Kosovo
- Parent range: Albanian Alps

Guri i Kuq (Albanian: Guri i Kuq or Guri i Verdhë; Serbian: Жути камен, Žuti kamen, translated as "red rock or yellow rock") is a mountain in the Accursed Mountains in Kosovo. Reaching a height of 2,522 m (8,274 ft) high, it is one of the highest mountains in the range. North of the mountain is the Rugova Canyon. The Kopranik mountain is located just east of Guri i Kuq. There is a lake near the summit of the mountain, the Guri i Kuq Lake.
