= Përlepnicë Lake =

Lake in Kosovo

- Liqeni i Përlepnicës (Albanian); Језеро Прилепница / Jezero Prilepnica (Serbian)
- Location within Kosovo Location within Europe
- Interactive map of Përlepnicë Lake
- Location: Gollak Mountains, eastern Kosovo
- Coordinates: 42°31′35″N 21°30′46″E
- Basin countries: Kosovo
- Max. length: 1.4 km (0.87 mi)
- Max. width: 300 m (980 ft)
- Surface area: 0.18 km^{2} (0.069 sq mi)
- Surface elevation: 620 m (2,030 ft)

Përlepnicë Lake (Albanian: Liqeni i Përlepnicës; Serbian: Језеро Прилепница / Jezero Prilepnica) is a small lake in eastern Kosovo, surrounded by the Gollak mountains. A stream from the South Morava River flows through the lake, making it the largest lake in eastern Kosovo.

The Përlepnicë Lake is just northeast of Gjilan and provides water for the city.

== See also ==
- List of lakes of Kosovo
