= Junik =

Junik: Junik or Juniku (Albanian) Junik or Јуник (Serbian)
- Town and municipality
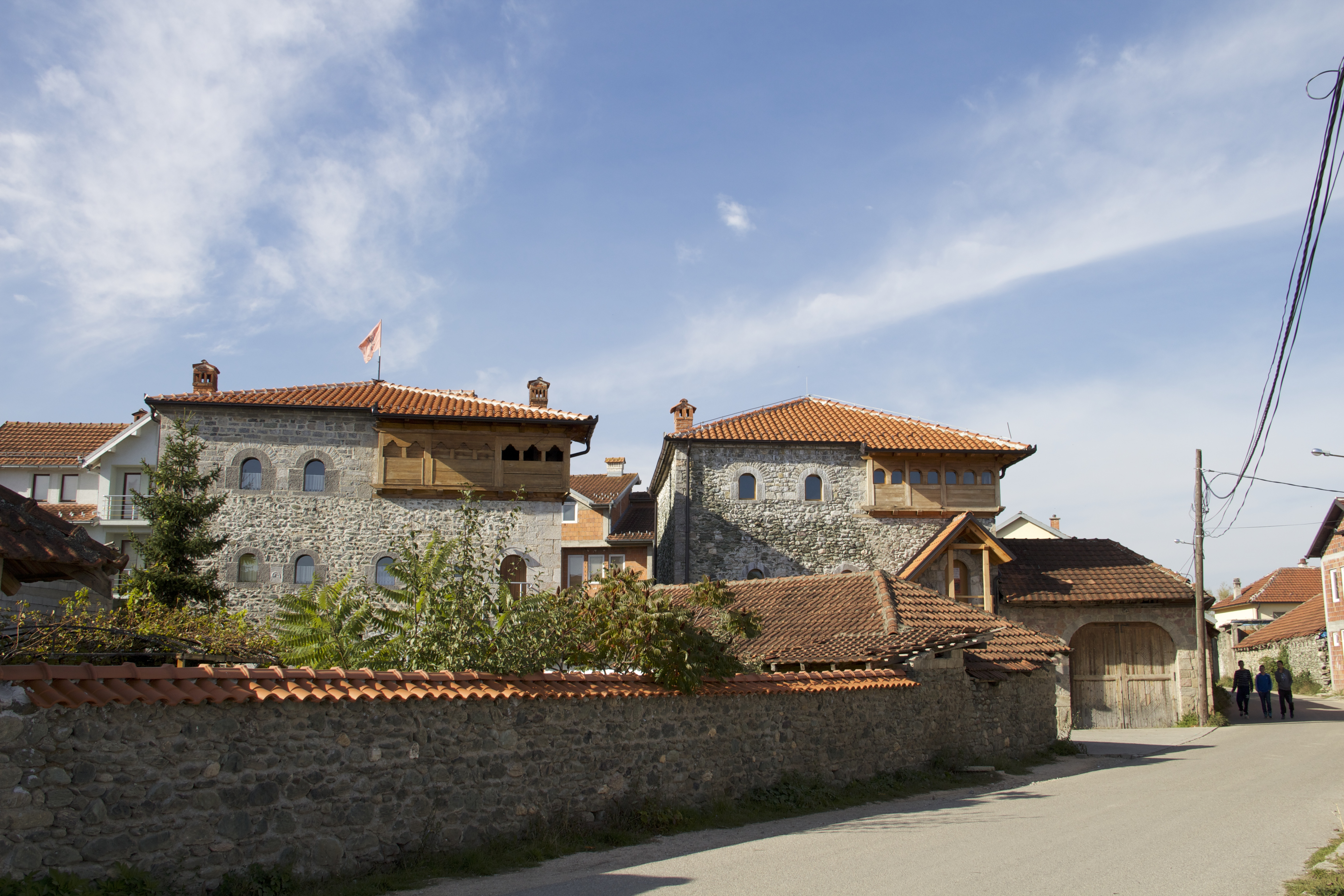

- Interactive map of Junik
- Location within Kosovo
- Coordinates: 42°28′34″N 20°16′39″E
- Country: Kosovo
- District: District of Gjakova
- Municipality: Junik Municipality
- Municipality: 2008

Government
  - Mayor: Ruzhdi Shehu (LDK)

Area
  - Municipality: 77.78 km^{2} (30.03 sq mi)
- Elevation: 517 m (1,696 ft)

Population (2024)
  - Municipality: 3,943
  - Density: 50.69/km^{2} (131.3/sq mi)
  - Ethnicity: 99.87% Albanian; 0.13% Other
- Demonym(s): Albanian: Junikas (m), Junikase (f)
- Time zone: UTC1
- Postal code: 50000
- Area code: +383 390
- Vehicle registration: 07
- Website: kk.rks-gov.net/junik

Junik (Albanian definite form: Juniku; Serbian Cyrillic: Јуник) is a town and municipality in the Gjakova District in western Kosovo.

== History ==
During the Ottoman occupation of the Balkans, Junik and the Municipality of Junik were part of the Nahiya of Altun-ili during the 15th century. In a 1485 defter of the region, Junik was mentioned with the name Lunik. In the 15th century, around half of Junik's population had typical Albanian anthroponomy. The Ottoman register from 1485 indicates that Junik was mostly inhabited by an Albanian population who bore Albanian names mixed with Slavic and Christian. Junik was also recorded with 52 households in the 1485 register. During the early period of Ottoman occupation, Gjakova and the Gjakova Municipality were part of the Nahiya of Altun-ili. Most of the villages in the Nahiya of Altun-ili were dominated by inhabitants with Albanian anthroponomy, which indicates that during the 15th century (as supported by Ottoman defters), the lands between Junik and Gjakova were inhabited by a dominant ethnic Albanian majority.

In 1915, Montenegrin troops entered Albanian villages, and in Junik, Vojvoda Milika Vojvodić from Morača terrorized the local population. According to Milan Scekic in Radio Petnica, Montenegrin officials, especially in Metohija, acted as petty tyrants, disregarding laws and oppressing locals. Vojvodić, as Junik's municipal president, abused his power so severely that even some Montenegrin gendarmes resented him—not out of sympathy for Albanians, but because he hoarded illicit gains instead of sharing them.

== Geography ==
Junik is located between Deçan and Gjakova along Kosovo's mountainous border with Albania. It has a convenient geographical position because it extends to the north-west of the Dukagjin plain, located on the left side of the Erenik river, which originates from the Gjeravica lakes and goes through the valleys of the Albanian Alps.

Junik is bordered by Deçan, Gjakova, Albania and Montenegro. The distance Junik-Peja is 25 km, Junik-Gjakova is 20 km, passing through the village of Batushë, while the distance from Junik to Rastavicë (Peja-Gjakova highway) is 5.5 km.

=== Climate ===
Junik has a continental climate, but with some Mediterranean features. This climate is suitable for the cultivation of various agricultural crops. The average monthly temperature is 21 °C (70 °F) in July and −11 °C (12 °F) in January.

=== Hydrology ===
The Erenik river is the largest and most important in the region, which also serves as a source of water for the irrigation of the Junik field.

== Demographics ==
According to the last census of 2024 by the Kosovo Agency of Statistics, Junik has 3,943 inhabitants.

=== Ethnicity ===
Of Junik's 3,943 residents, an overwhelming 99.87% are ethnic Albanians, reflecting a highly homogeneous population.

== Notable people ==
- Luan Krasniqi
- Robin Krasniqi
- Din Mehmeti

== See also ==
- District of Gjakova
- Neutral Zone of Junik
