= Gjeravica =

Mountain in Kosovo

- Đeravica
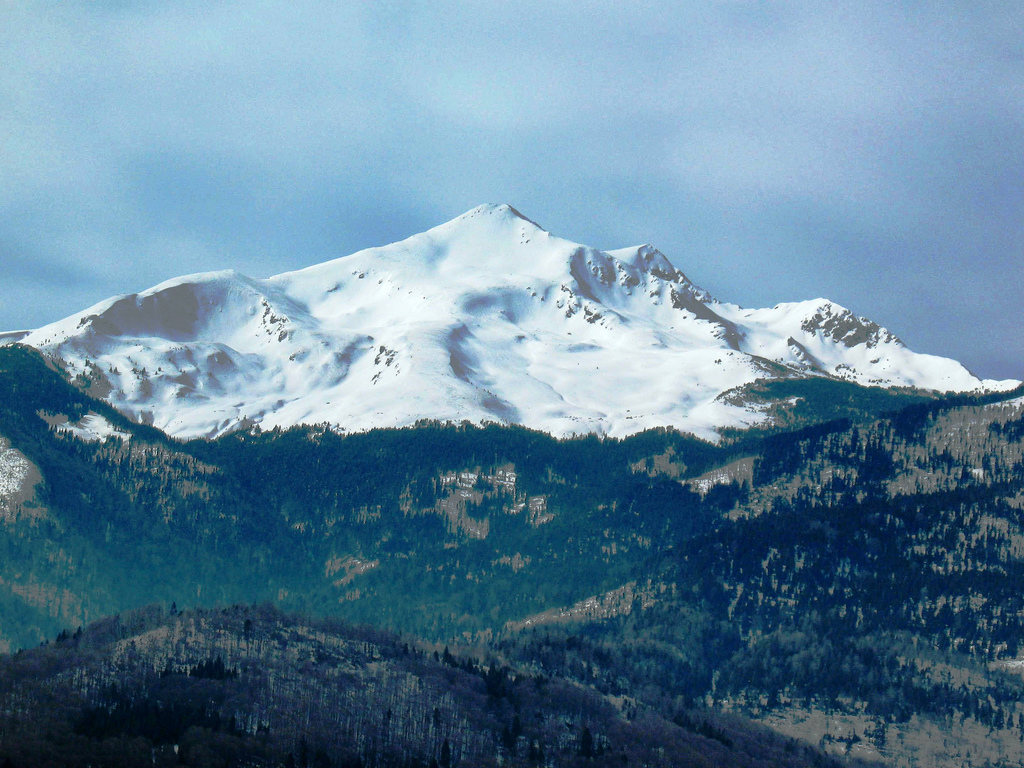
- Gjeravica

Highest point
- Elevation: 2,656 m (8,714 ft)
- Prominence: 1,018 m (3,340 ft)
- Isolation: 28.71 km (17.84 mi)
- Listing: Ribu
- Coordinates: 42°32′1″N 20°08′24″E

Naming
- Pronunciation: Albanian pronunciation: [ɟɛɾavitsa] Serbian pronunciation: [dʑɛraʋitsa]

Geography
- Location within Kosovo
- Location: Deçan
- Country: Kosovo
- Parent range: Accursed Mountains

Gjeravica (Albanian indefinite form: Gjeravicë; Serbian: Ђеравица / Đeravica) is a mountain peak in Kosovo. It also is the second-highest mountain peak in the Accursed Mountains range and the Dinaric Alps range, after Jezercë. It has an elevation of 2,656 m (8,714 ft) above sea level. Gjeravica is in the western part of Kosovo, in the municipality of Junik.

== Features ==
Gjeravica is somewhat different from the rest of the Accursed mountains in its lack of the stony, limestone texture the other mountains in Accursed Mountains have. Many large and small glacial lakes can be found near the summit. The largest of the lakes is Gjeravica Lake, which is just under the summit and is the origin of the Erenik river.

Gjeravica and the Accursed mountains range are rich in the growth of chestnuts, oak, beech and conifers. There are also wild strawberries growing in Gjeravica during the summer.

== Geography ==
=== Nearby settlements ===
- Deçan
- Junik
- Peja
- Belaje
- Krsi i Cenit
- Krsi i Zi

=== Nearby peaks ===
- Kumulore
- Tropojske Pločice
- Guri i Gjate
- Maja e Ram Arućit
- Ljogi i Prels

=== Cliffs ===
- Biga Tamas
- Krsi i Cenit
- Kumulore
- Krsi i Zi
- Guri i Mal
- Gurt e Ljove
- Brehov
- Minarja

=== Nearby springs ===
- Kroni Tedel
- Kroni Gusija
- Kroni i Lizit
- Kroni i Nuses
- Gura e Hasanags
- Kroni i Metes
- Gura e Mir
- Kroni i Rasave
- Kroni i Smajlit
- Gura i Cursis
- Gura Hods
- Kroni i Mir

== Tourism and access ==
Gjeravica is officially the highest peak in Kosovo (unofficially Great Rudoka) and one of the most visited alpine destinations in the western Balkans. The mountain is accessible from the village of Junik and through trails within Bjeshkët e Nemuna National Park, which protects the surrounding alpine ecosystem.

The best conditions for hiking are from June to October. During winter and early spring, snow cover on the upper sections requires appropriate alpine equipment. The summit offers panoramic views across Kosovo, Albania and Montenegro, with clear sightlines toward Jezercë to the southwest.

Unlike the limestone karst terrain characteristic of most Accursed Mountains peaks, Gjeravica's upper slopes feature a more varied geological composition. Several glacial lakes are visible on the approach to the summit, the largest being Gjeravica Lake, which sits just below the peak and marks the source of the Erenik river.

== History ==
=== Kosovo war ===
On 15 September 1998, during the Kosovo war, Agim Ramadani and his troops led an operation against Yugoslav soldiers in areas near Gjeravica. In the series of attacks that followed, 40 Yugoslav soldiers were killed and another 20 were injured.

== Gallery ==
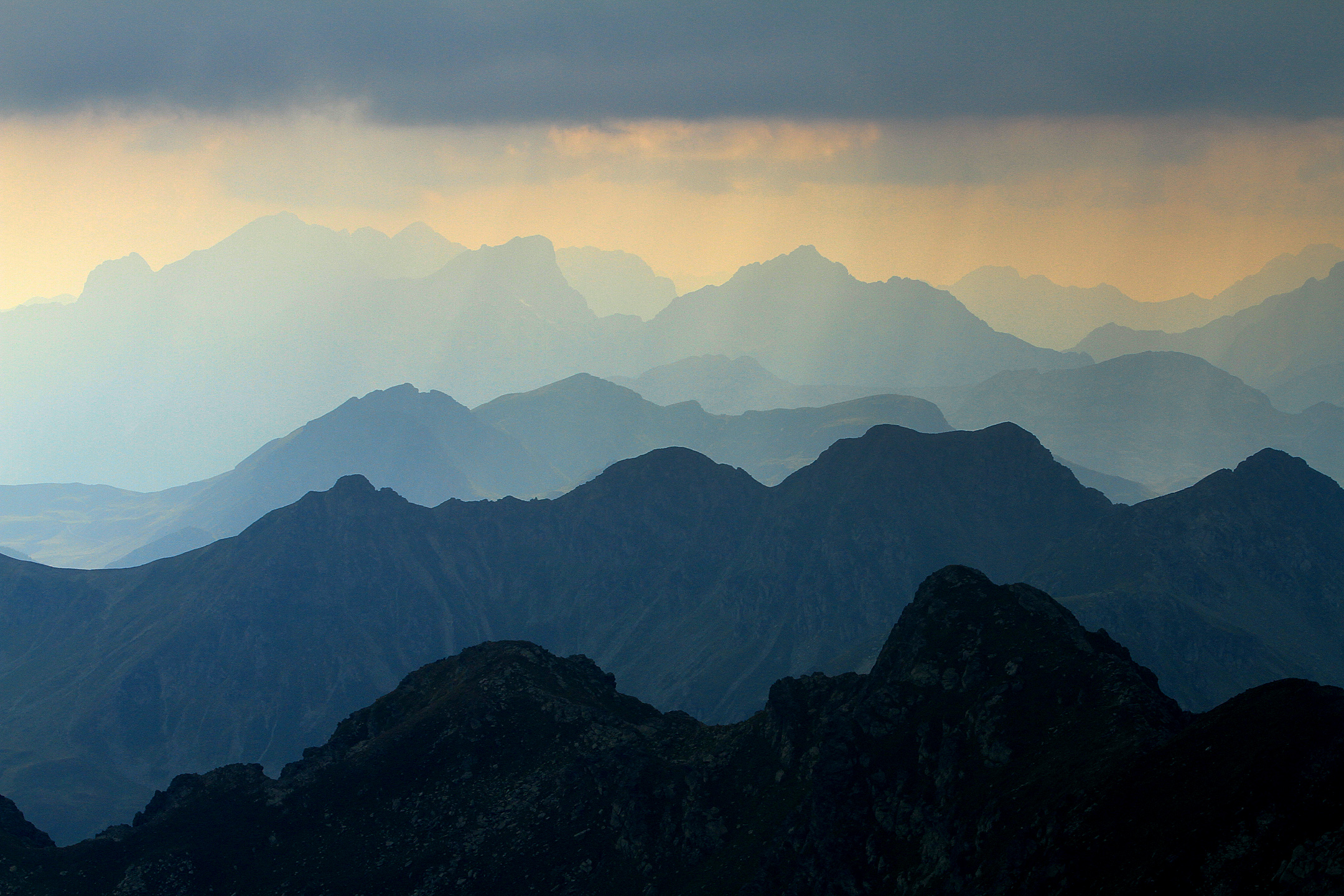
The mountains seen from the Gjeravica

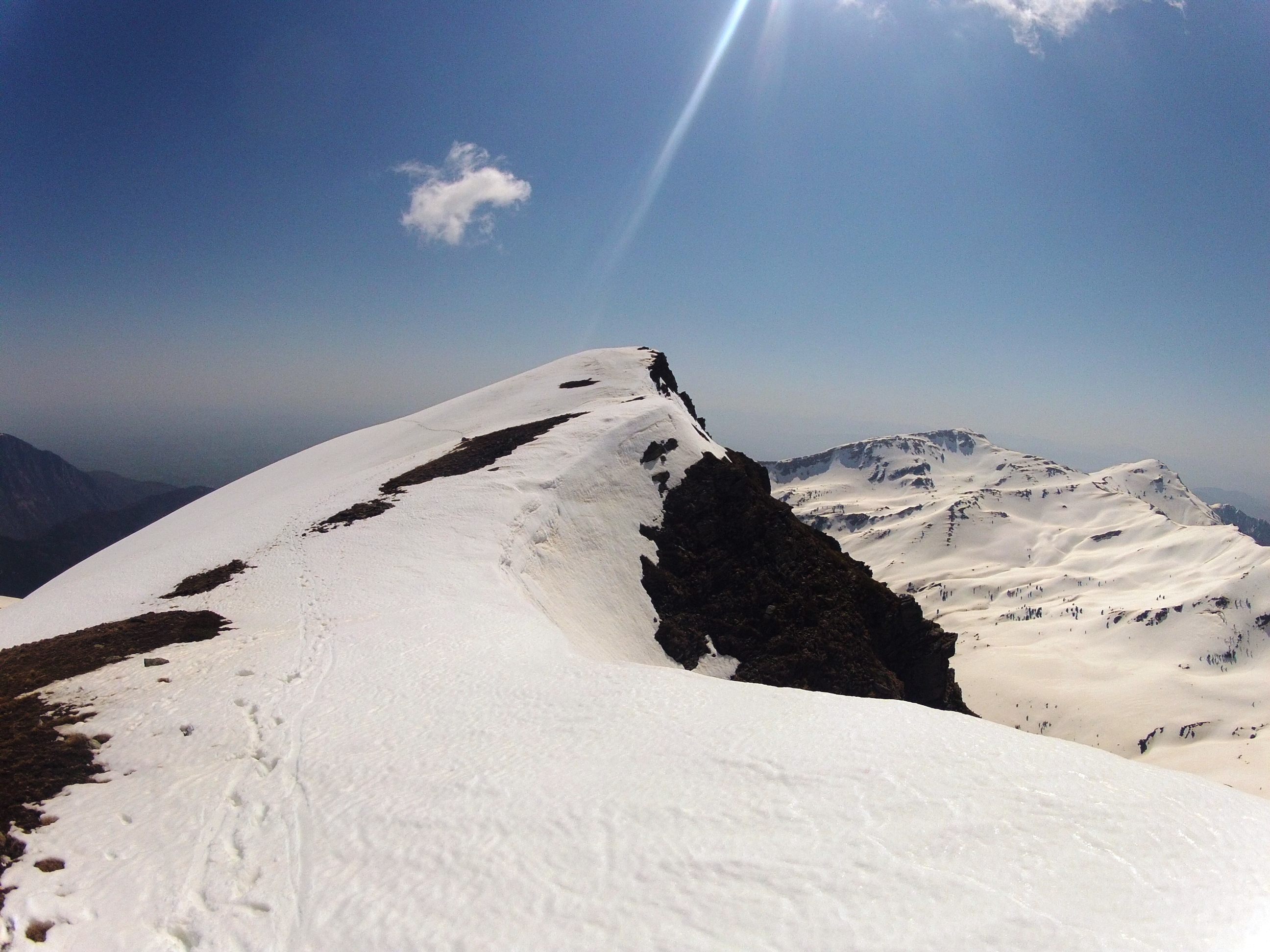
Gjeravica with snowy conditions during a sunny day

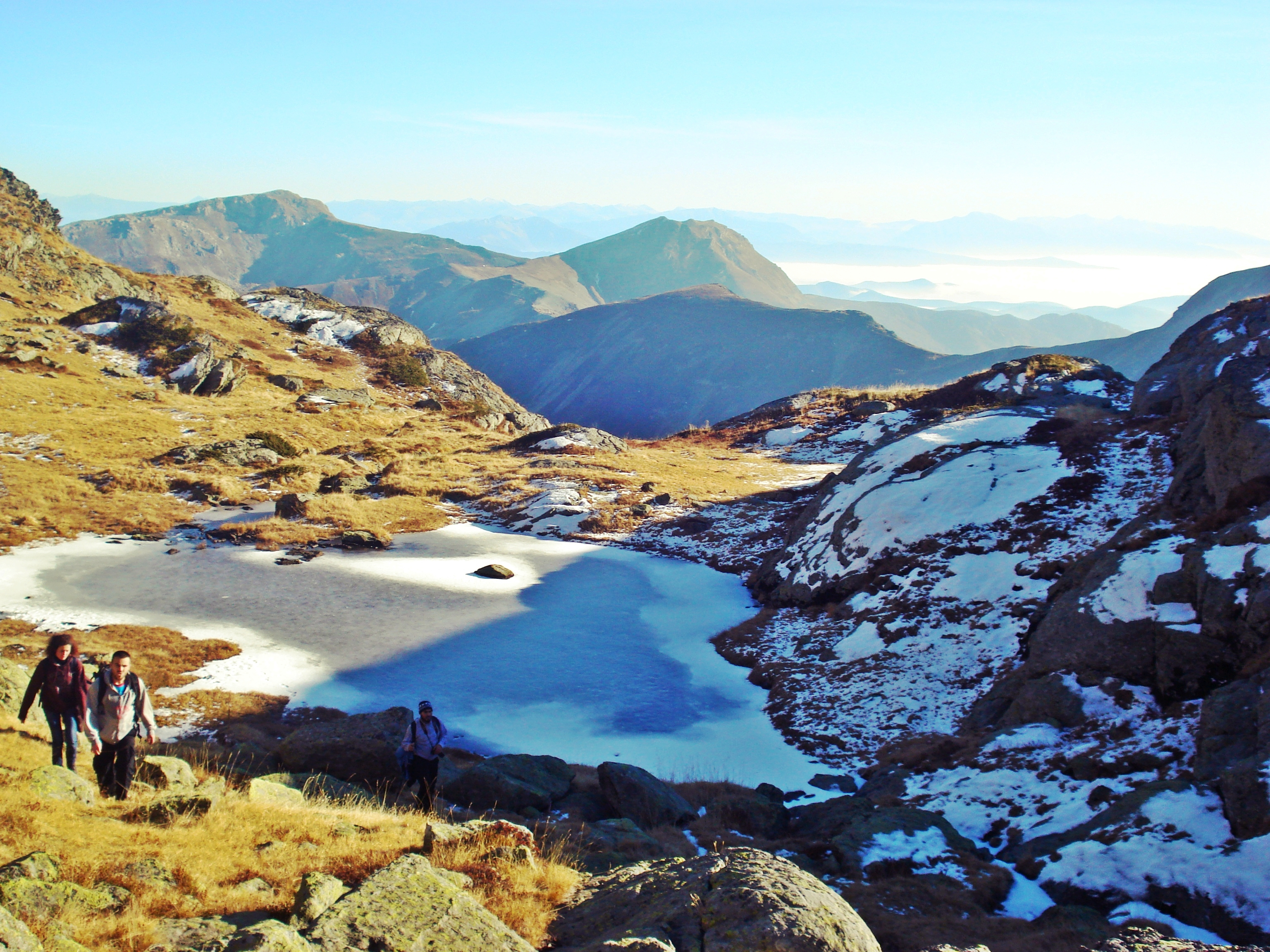
Frozen here is the Zemra Lake, a heart-shaped lake near the peak

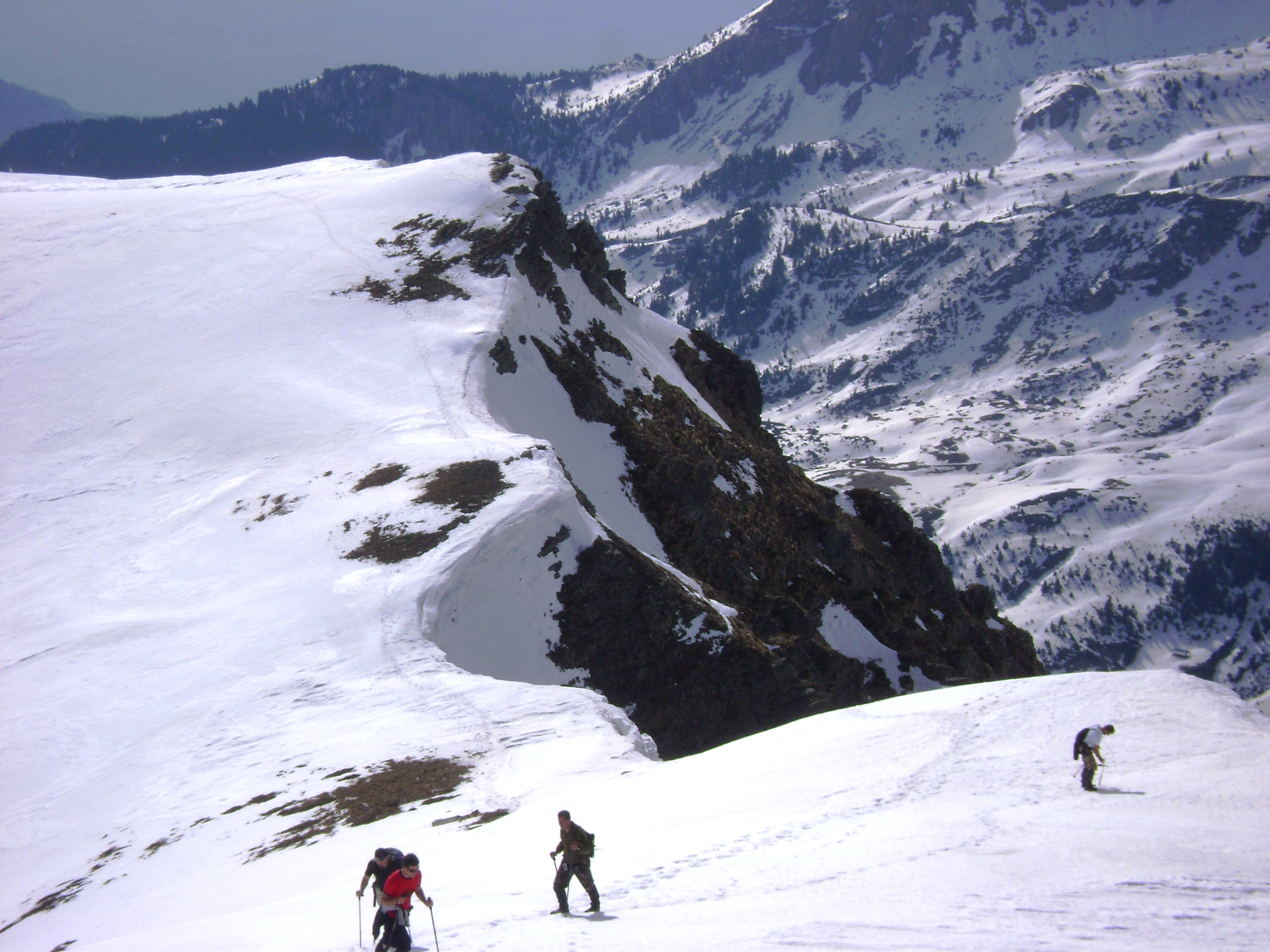
Skiers trying to slide down the peak

== See also ==
- List of mountains in Kosovo
- Bjeshkët e Nemuna National Park
- National parks of Kosovo
