= Literature of Kosovo =

The literature of Kosovo is composed of literary texts written in Albanian, Serbian, Bosnian, and Turkish, specifically by authors of Kosovo. Kosovo produced several prominent writers in the Ottoman era. However, Ottoman authorities banned the written use of the Albanian language until 1912. This policy continued during Serb rule until the outbreak of World War II.

After Serbia invaded Kosovo, Albanian-language schooling and publishing were suppressed. After the war, school tests were mostly in Serbian. Underground literature flourished in the late 1940s, which were written and published in Albanian. Under Aleksandar Ranković, everybody who bought the Albanian-language newspaper Rilindja was registered with the secret police. Full Albanian-language and cultural facilities were granted by the Yugoslav constitution of 1974, and Kosovo Albanian literature and culture flourished.

== Serbian literature in Kosovo ==
Kosovo, as well as Raška and Mount Athos, was the home of many pieces of early Serb literature from the 13th century onward. The most prominent Serb literary figures in Kosovo during the 20th century were novelist Vukašin Filipović, poets Darinka Jevrić, Petar Sarić and Radosav Stojanović, and short story writer Lazar Vučković.

== Ottoman era ==
During Ottoman rule, Kosovo was part of the broader Ottoman literary culture; Prizren had libraries, a medrese, schools, and a hamam. Prominent writers include:

- Pjetër Bogdani, the first Kosovar-Albanian writer;
- Celalzade Salih Çelebi, a historian;
- Pristinaşi Mesihi, who pioneered humorous Ottoman Turkish language poetry;
- Prizrenli Suzi Çelebi, who also founded an important vakıf;
- Aşık Çelebi, Ottoman biographer, poet, and translator.
- Tahir Efendi Jakova, Bejtexhinj movement poet, teacher, and religious leader

== Later history ==
Little is known in the field of literary in countries which were once part of the Soviet bloc. Strict politics and obscurantism had forbid authors to freely express their thoughts for years, and it was impossible for them to see their works published and gain prominence in the literary world. However, after the fall of the Soviet Union, Europe is now discovering a new interest in Eastern Europe. Not only in terms of travels and foreign relationships, but also from a cultural perspective. Kosovo certainly stands as the most peculiar nations which were formed from the dissolution of Yugoslavia. To this day, Kosovo's independence as a state is still open to debate, and the European Union has not expressed an opinion on this matter yet. With such undefined situation, one might wonder if there is a cultural voice that defines this country and the answer is not definite as well. The truth is that no one speaks of "Kosovar Literature" but it's more likely one hears of "Albanian Literature of Kosovo", because that is what it is. But despite this literature being defined through the use of the term "Albanian", it still holds a peculiarity which makes it a bit foreign to the Albanian ear. The 1990s were a particular hard time for Kosovo and in the years leading to the 1999 war, the country's dissidents could either be threatened or worse. Discrimination and the strictness of Serbian rule did not allow this generation of Albanian speaking writers to express themselves. In addition to the chaos and repression taking place in Kosovo, the country's intellectual minds had language issues to overcome: having been denied access to Albanian as a language as part of the educational system in Kosovo, barriers could then be found in literary form.

== After World War II ==
Albanian literature in Kosovo was set off by poet Esad Mekuli (1916–1993) who was the founder of the literacy periodical Jeta e Re in 1949, even though it was not active until the 1960s. In addition to that the novelist Adem Demaci, who spent twenty-eight years as a political prisoner of Yugoslavian government, also plays a huge role in the advancement of the magazine "Jeta e Re" which later was published as a book, as well as the successful collections Njifyell ndër male (1953; a flute in the mountains), and Kânga e vërrinit (1954; song of the lowland pastures) by Martin Camaj who become a leading scholar of Albanian studies at LMU Munich and the Sapienza University of Rome. In 1974, more freedom and a semblance of equality was given to Kosovo Albanians by the Yugoslav constitution for the first time, and literature bloomed on the Plain of the Blackbird in the following decade. From the several leading prose writers, some that are worth mentioning are Anton Pashku (1937–1995), Rexhep Qosja (b. 1936), notably for his explosive political novel Vdjeka më vjen prej syve të tillë (1974; death comes from such eyes), Nazmi Rrahmani who was a prolific novelist (b. 1941) and Teki Dervishi ( 1943). Kosovo's poetry has been a lot more creative and experimental compared Albania. Among its leading proponents are Din Mehmeti (1932), Besim Bokshi (b. 1932), Azem Shkreli (b. 1938), Rrahman Dedaj (1939), Ali Podrimja (1942), Eqrem Basha (1948), Sabri Hamiti (1950), and Basri Çapriqi (1960).

== Dialects ==
There are two distinct dialects in modern Albanian. Catholic priests wrote most of the Albanian literature in Toske dialect and Gheg which is spoken in northern Albania and Kosovo. It is also spoken in Northern Albania, North Macedonia, and in parts of Montenegro. Each area of Northern Albania has its own sub-dialect: Tirana, Durrës, Elbasan and Kavajë; Krujë and Laçi; Mati, Dibra and Mirdita; Lezhë, Shkodër, Krajë, Ulqin; etc. Malësia e Madhe, Rugova, and villages scattered alongside the Adriatic Coast form the northmost sub-dialect of Albania today. There are many other sub-dialects in the region of Kosovo and in parts of southern Montenegro, and in North Macedonia. The sub-dialects of Malësia e Madhe and Dukagjini near Shkodra are being lost because the younger generations prefer to speak the sub-dialect of Shkodra. The other dialect is Tosk which is spoken in south Albania. When Albanian language was standardized in 1972, it was more based on Tosk than Gheg . The difference between these two dialects is mostly linguistic, but we have cultural factors too. Albanian can be divided into two main dialects, Gheg and Tosk. The Shkumbin river is roughly the dividing line, with Gheg spoken north of the Shkumbin and Tosk south of it. The Gheg literary language has been documented since 1462. Until the Communists took power in Albania, the standard was based on Gheg. Although the literary versions of Tosk and Gheg are mutually intelligible, many of the regional dialects are not. Nevertheless, Albanian language literature from Kosovo is mostly written in the Gheg dialect.

== Prose and poetry ==
Poetry related to topics, such as war and the need for national freedom, was started by Esad Mekuli with the summary "Per Ty" which is considered an inspiration for many other authors. Another type of poetry is the one of Din Mehmeti and Ali Podrimja which is a form of exclamation. In addition to that, "Kurora Sonetike" which is structured by Enver Gjereqeku, also plays a huge role in Kosovo's Literature. During the 70s and 80s the most dominant kind of poetry was the one with unique poetic systems ruled by Sabri Hamiti and Musa Ramadani. Sabri Hamiti forms a system of poetic opus while Musa Ramadani forms a type of poetic book system. "Neurosis" which is a summary of poetry by Musa Ramadani deals with avant-garde visual subjects. However, another important event in Kosovo's Literature is Ali Podrimja's "Lum Lumi" which covers the whole 8th decade of the 20th century. Kosovar literature has divided prose in two lines: traditional and modern lines. Traditional is expressed in romantic spirit and the modern spirit with literary currents of European modernism. Prose takes place also in two paths: Modernist intellectual direction and social topic. Modern prose with authentic symbolic signs was founded by Anton Pashku. The modern spirit with postmodern elements was created by Rexhep Qosja and especially Musa Ramadani. Meanwhile, Hivzi Sylejmani, Nazmi Rrahmani and Zejnullah Rrahmani have worked on social topic; it is worth mentioning the "Hermetic code" prose by Zejnullah Rrahmani, Musa Ramadani, Beqir Musliu and Eqrem Basha. In this flow, Adem Demaci creates national prosaic code with "Gjaperinjt e gjakut (1958)" roman. Double coding prose was written by Rexhep Qosja "Nje dashuri dhe shtate faje", "Bijte e askujt", continuing with Musa Ramadani "Antiprocesioni", "Vrapuesja e Prizerenit" and Eqrem Basha "Lakorja e x-it", "Marshi i kermilllit".

== Literary criticism ==
Carriers of literary criticism in Kosovo were three leaders, Rexhep Qosja, Ibrahim Rugova and Sabri Hamiti. Rexhep Qosja passes systematically literary works according to the integral method, while Ibrahim Rugova and Sabri Hamiti pass the contemporary criticism with more sophisticated methods inspired by French schools. These last two become icons of literature, criticism and literary thought for the Albanian Literacy in general.

== Albanian verbal creations ==
Verbal creations, which are often called as traditional creations, like songs, riddles, tales or other are called such because they are confessed orally and are transferred to us from mouth to mouth. These creations are divided into lyrical creations and epic creations, while the traditional poetry can be found as epic-lyrical. Usually, oral poetry is accompanied by instruments. Verbal creations were born earlier than writing creations. In fact, each traditional creation is a product of the human mind, but it adapts the environment with time. Verbal creations are created by extending and increasing wider, and while they are changed or adapted, they lose their authorship and become traditional creations.

== Authors ==
=== Pjetër Bogdani ===
Pjetër Bogdani (c. 1630 – December 1689), known in Italian as Pietro Bogdano, is the most original writer of early literature in Albanian. He was born in Prizren. Pjetër Bogdani is considered the first Kosovar-Albanian writer. He is author of the Cuneus Prophetarum (The Band of the Prophets), 1685, the first prose work of substance written originally in Albanian Gegnisht (i.e. not a translation).

=== Shtjefën Gjeçovi ===
Shtjefën Konstantin Gjeçovi-Kryeziu (1874 – 1929) was an Albanian Catholic priest, ethnologist and folklorist. He is known for being the father of Albanians' folklore studies.

=== Esad Mekuli ===
Esad Mekuli (17 December 1916 – 6 August 1993) was an Albanian poet, critic and translator. He was the first president of the Academy of Sciences and Arts of Kosovo. Robert Elsie considered him the father of modern Albanian poetry in Yugoslavia, and his influence in Kosovo remains immense.

=== Rexhep Qosja ===
Rexhep Qosja (born 1936) is an Albanian writer, literary critic and Professor at University of Prishtina. He has been considered the first postmodern Albanian novelist and one of the greatest Balkans literary critics. He is the first Doctor of Philological Sciences in Kosovo. Qosja is the author of various anthologies and scholarly monographs, including a three-volume history of Albanian literature in the Romantic period. He is also the author of the novel Vdekja më vjen prej syve të tillë (Death Comes to Me from Such Eyes, Pristina, 1974), translated into French, Italian, Greek, German, Dutch, Slovenian, Bulgarian and Serbian.

=== Ibrahim Rugova ===
Ibrahim Rugova (2 December 1944 – 21 January 2006) was a Kosovo-Albanian politician, scholar, and writer, who served as the President of the partially recognised Republic of Kosova, serving from 1992 to 2000 and as President of Kosovo from 2002 until his death in 2006. He studied literature at the University of Prishtina and the University of Paris, and received a doctorate with a dissertation on Albanian literary criticism. He spent two years (1976–1977) at the École Pratique des Hautes Études of the University of Paris, where he studied under Roland Barthes.

=== Ali Podrimja ===
Ali Podrimja plays a huge role in Kosovar and even Albanian literature. He was born in 1942 in Gjakova. He published prose and poetry from 1961, and has published ten volumes of his poetry to date. While at school he had already published his first collection of poems, "Thirrje" (1961, tr: The Calls). In his following books, he revealed himself to be a mature symbolist, who could avail himself of a diversity of rhymes and metres. A turning point in his work came with the poetry collection "Lum Lumi" (1982). It is an homage to his young son Lumi, who died of cancer. He examines themes of loneliness, fear, death and fate. Podrimja's tone, however, remains laconic. His poems exhibit a dense structure, and he plays with powerful images and avoids any artistic prolixity. As a master of terse symbols and allegories, he also weaves elements of orally transmitted Albanian folk poetry, unusual metaphors and modern language use into his poetry, and surprises the reader with unexpected syntactic structures and subtle rhymes. Podrimja's collection "Ich sattle das Ross den Tod" (1991) I Saddle Death the Steed) was the very first German-language publication by a contemporary Albanian poet. In it, he condenses his experience of daily menace, injustice and Europe's apathy. Podrimja's books were translated also in other languages as: English, French, Italian, Polish, Romanian, Turkish, Greek, Serbian, Croatian, Slovenian, and also were present in many anthologies in foreign languages.

=== Sabri Hamiti ===
Having huge impact in the Kosovar Literature, poet and critic Sabri Hamiti born in Podujevë in 1950, studied comparative literature both in Zagreb and at the Ecole Pratique des Hautes Etudes in Paris, where the demigods of French structuralism brought their influence to bear on him. He finished his doctorate at the University of Prishtina. Hamiti is the author of numerous volumes of prose, poetry and drama, as well as innovative criticism. Among his most recent verse collections are: Thikë harrimi, Prishtina 1975 (Knife of oblivion); Trungu ilir, Prishtina 1979 (The Illyrian stock); Leja e njohtimit, Prishtina 1985 (Identity papers); Kaosmos, Prishtina 1990 (Chaosmos), and ABC, Prishtina 1994. He was an editor at the publishing house "Rilindja" until 1991, as well as a professor of literature in the University of Pristina from 1993 until his retirement in 2020.

==== Eqrem Basha ====
Eqrem Basha, born 1948 in Dibra, PR Macedonia, is among the most respected contemporary writers of Kosovo in recent years. His life and literary production are intimately linked to Kosovo and its capital Pristina, where he has lived and worked since the 1970s. Basha is the author of eight volumes of innovative verse spanning the years from 1971 to 1995, three volumes of short stories and numerous translations (in particular French literature and drama). Eqrem Basha is an enigmatic poet. Perplexing, fascinating, and difficult to classify in a literary sense, he succeeds in transmitting a certain mystique to the inquisitive reader. At one moment he seems coolly logical and shows an admirable ability to reason deductively, and the next moment he is overcome by absurd flights of fancy into a surrealistic world where apparently nothing makes any sense. His verse is light, colloquial and much less declamatory than that of many of his predecessors.

==== Anton Pashku ====
Anton Pashku was born on January 8, 1937, in Graždanik (village near Prizren). He finished high school education in Pristina. He worked as a redactor in the "Rilindja" journal. He began publishing his literary writings since 1955 and wrote prose and drama. In his stories he distinguished three basic thematic districts; the district of love, loneliness, and the district of violence on the individual. Even though he did not have many writings, the ones that he wrote venerate out literature in general. His best novels are: "Tregime"(1961, "Një pjesë e lindjes"(1965), "Kulla"(1968), "Sinkopa" (1969), "Oh"(1971)," Kjasina"(1973), "Gof" (1976) and "Lutjet e mbrëmjes" (1978). With the undisputed artistic values, the novel "Oh" had a slow but strong influence on the Albanian prose. Anton Pashku brings a spirit entirely in the tradition of modern Albanian prose. He was elected member of the Science and Art Academy in Kosovo. He died in Pristina.

==== Rifat Kukaj ====
Rifat Kukaj (25 October 1938 – 11 September 2005) was a Kosovar Albanian and a successful writer in Albanian literature for grown ups and children. He was born in the Drenica region of the Kingdom of Yugoslavia, in present-day Kosovo. He was educated in Drenica and Pristina. Rifat Kukaj has published over forty books. His best novels are Bardhi e Mirushja, Rrasa e zogut, Shkrepi i diellit, Lepuri me pesë këmbë, Vjollca magjike, Zogu i bardhë, Kokërrmeli e pilivesa, Gjeli në kuvertë, Xhuxhi nga xhuxhishta. Rifat Kukaj is best known for his poems for children. He has published the following volumes of poems for children: Gjerdani i blertë, Lejlekët në luhaja, Vallja e kallinjve, Deti u bëftë kos, Çka fshin dhelpra me bisht, Pshurrani i gjyshit, Shtegu i laureshave, Trimëritë e karkalecit, Zogu i Lasgushit. He has also published many volumes of stories, among others: Harmonika, Përqafimet e njoma, Rrëfenjëza, Ujku me kamerë, Djaloshi i zjarreve, Elefanti që fluturonte. He was very well known for his unique humor and was widely perceived as the pioneer of urban humor culture in Priština. Rifak Kukaj has also translated a number of books from Slovenian, Serbian, and Croatian to Albanian.

=== Din Mehmeti ===
Din Mehmeti (1932 – 12 November 2010) was an Albanian poet from Kosovo. He was among the best-known classical representatives of contemporary verse in Kosovo.

==== Azem Shkreli ====
Azem Shkreli (1938–1997) has been described as a poet of profound ideas and critical judgments. He was born in the Rugova mountains near Peja and became head of Kosova Film Studios in Prishtina. Shkreli is an intellectual poet who, though highly expressive, is by no means verbose. His urban perception of things has given new significance to his experience of rural customs among the rugged tribes of the Rugova highlands with their traditional wisdom and way of life. His early volumes of verse offered masterful portraits of these legendary mountain inhabitants. The idyllic though specifically organized landscape which Azem Shkreli paints does not blind him to problems of ethics. Much of his verse, a moral catharsis in words, is devoted to the oppressed peoples of the Third World, expressing a poetic solidarity with them against exploitation and suffering. Shkreli is also the author of the short story collection Sytë e Evës, Prishtina 1965 (Eve's eyes), and the novel Karvani i bardhë, Priština 1960 (The white caravan). For many years he has been chairman of the Kosovo Writers Association and Founding Director of Kosova Film. Shkreli climbed to the top of today's Albanian poetry, and he consolidated and reinforced this place from one poetic work to the other, until his last work called "Zogj dhe Gure", published in 1997, which in that year he died.

=== Basri Çapriqi ===
Basri Çapriqi (1960–2018) was an Albanian poet and literary critic. He was born in Krute (Krytha) in Ulcinj Municipality (Ulqin), present-day Montenegro and studied Albanian language and literature at the University of Pristina, where later he was a professor. He has been considered one of the best Albanian poets.

=== Sali Bashota ===
Sali Bashota was born on 31 August 1959 in Çaravik in the municipality of Klina in Kosova. He studied Albanian language and literature at the University of Prishtina where he later taught literature. He is well-known poet.

=== Edi Shukriu ===
Edi Shukriu (22 October 1950 – January 2023) was a Kosovan political figure, archaeologist, and writer.

=== Flora Brovina ===
Flora Brovina (born 30 September 1949) is a Kosovar Albanian poet, pediatrician and women's rights activist. She was born in the town of Skenderaj in the Drenica Valley of Kosovo, and was raised in Pristina, where she went to school and began studying medicine. After finishing her university studies in Zagreb, where she specialized in pediatrics, she returned to Kosovo and worked for a time as a journalist for the Albanian-language daily newspaper Rilindja. Soon thereafter, she returned to the health care profession and worked for many years in the Pediatrics Ward of the Pristina General Hospital.

=== Muhamet Hamiti ===
Muhamet Hamiti was born in the Podujevo municipality of Kosovo in 1964. He earned his BA in English language and literature at the University of Pristina in 1987; earned his MA in English literature at the Zagreb University (in Croatia) in 1990, and his PhD in English literature at the University of Pristina in 2006 with a thesis on the prose fiction of James Joyce and Joseph Conrad. In the 1990s, Hamiti was an independent scholar at the University of East Anglia and at Birkbeck College, University of London, respectively, pursuing research in and studies of literature. He taught English literature at the University of Pristina from 1989 until 2008. He is author of a monograph book on English literature, a range of literary essays, as well as literary translations from and into English.

=== Ag Apolloni ===
Ag Apolloni (born 13 June 1982) is an Albanian writer, poet, playwright, scholar, and essay writer. He is a professor at the University of Prishtina, Kosovo. His literary works are widely acclaimed for their dramatic dimension, philosophical treatment, and critical attitude towards history, politics, and society.
