= Radosav Stojanović =

Serbian writer and journalist (born 1950)

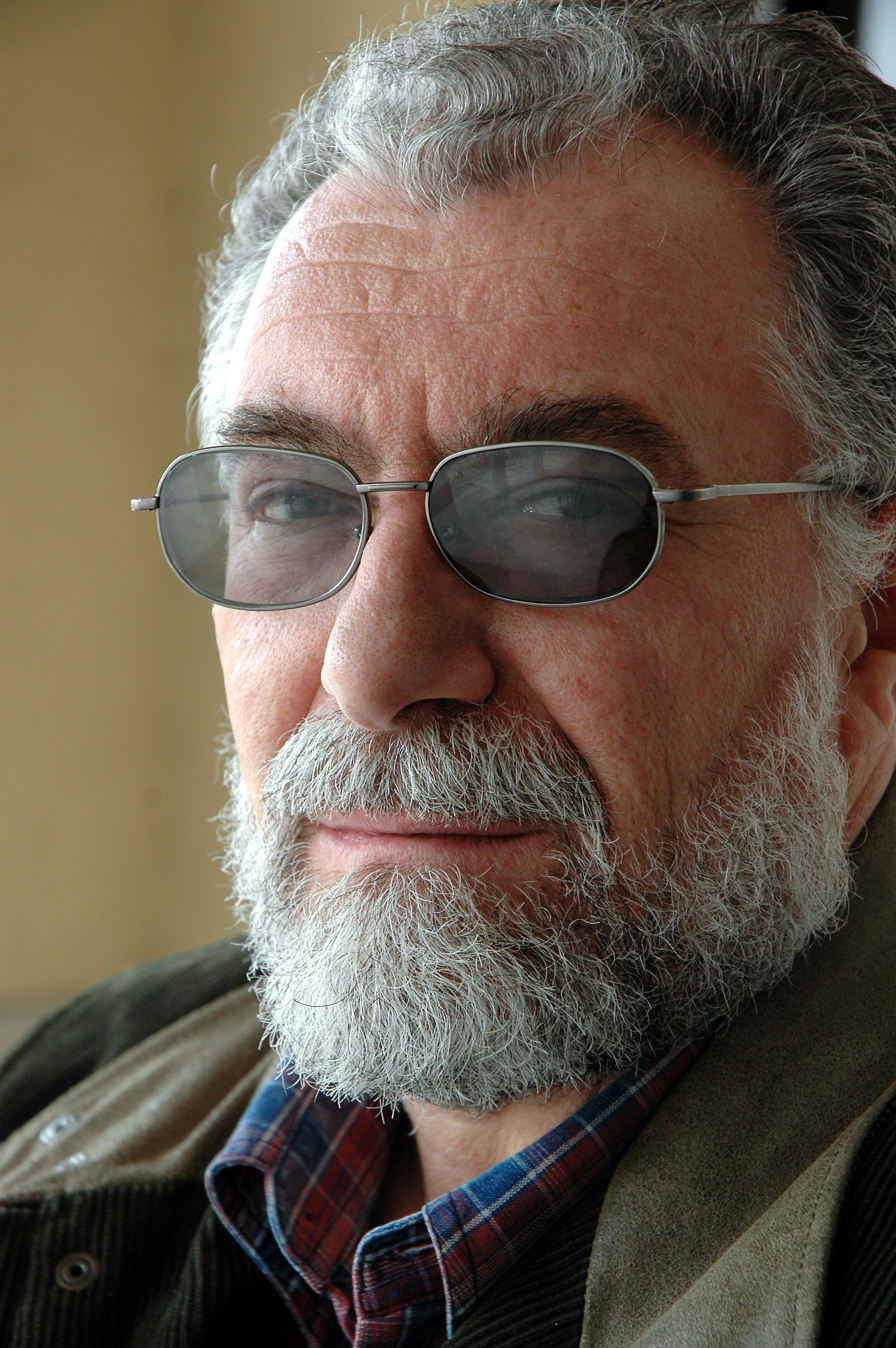
- Born: 1 November 1950 (age 75); Parunovac, FPR Yugoslavia
- Occupations: Writer, poet, lexicographer and publicist

Radosav Stojanović (Serbian Cyrillic: Радосав Стојановић; born 1 November 1950) is a Serbian writer, journalist and lexicographer.

== Biography ==
He grew up in Mlačište in Crna Trava and attended school in Mlačište, Crna Trava, Niš and Priština. He graduated from Priština University in Serbo-Croatian Language and Serbian literature.

He was a teacher at "Ivo Lola Ribar" Secondary School in Priština, a journalist, editor and editor-in-chief (1990–1993) for the "Jedinstvo" daily newspaper, and director of the Provincial National Theatre (1993–2004) in Priština

He was a full-time columnist and chronicler for "Književne reči" from Kosovo and Metohija (1985–1988), and president of the Literary Society of Kosovo and Metohija (1990–1992). He was editor of the "Stremljenja" magazine and editor-in-chief of "Srpski jug" (2004–2006) in Niš. He is member of the Writers' Association of Serbia since 1985 and the Journalists' Association of Serbia since 1979. He is also a member of the Society of Writers and Literary Translators of Niš.

Stojanović's work is included in anthologies and selections of Serbian poetry and short stories, both in his home country and abroad. His works have been translated into other languages. He was exiled from Kosovo in June 1999. He lives in Niš and Čemernik.

== Works ==
=== Books of poetry ===
- Inoslovlje, Jedinstvo, Priština, 1979
- Rukopis čemerski (The Čemerski Manuscript), Jedinstvo, Priština, 1982
- Đavolja škola (Devil's School), BIGZ, Beograd, 1988, ISBN 86-13-00261-7
- Povratak na kolac (Return to the Stake) Nolit, Beograd, 1990, ISBN 86-19-01817-5
- Sidro (Anchor), Rad, Beograd, 1993, ISBN 86-09-00302-7
- Netremice, Hvosno, Leposavić, 2003, ISBN 86-83629-12-0 and 2004, ISBN 86-83629-17-1
- Trepet (Quiver), Vranjske – Društvo književnika Kosova i Metohije, Vranje – Kosovska Mitrovica, 2007, ISBN 978-86-84287-39-9
- Pesme poslednjeg zanosa (Poems of Final Rapture), selected and new poems, Panorama, Priština – Beograd, 2012, ISBN 978-86-7019-292-8
- Bequeathing / Zаveštаnje, selected and new poems about love, Serbian – English edition, translated by Dusica Vuckovic, Hybrid Publishers, Melbourne, Victoria, Australia, 2014, ISBN 9781925000764
- Kad bi ljubavi bilo (If There Was Love), Majdan, Kostolac, 2015, ISBN 978-86-85413-72-8
- Pesme sudnjeg dana (Doomsday Songs) Čigoja štampa, Beograd, 2019.

=== Short story collections ===
- Aritonova smrt (Ariton's Death), Prosveta – Jedinstvo, Beograd – Priština, 1984
- Apokrifne price (Apocryphal Stories), Jedinstvo, Priština, 1988, ISBN 86-7019-028-1
- Mrtva straža (Deathwatch), Književne novine, Beograd, 1988, ISBN 86-391-0143-4 and Novi svet, Priština, 1997, ISBN 86-7967-015-4
- Kraj sveta (End of the World), Rad, Beograd, 1993, ISBN 86-09-00332-9
- Gospodar uspomena (Lord of Memories), Nolit, Beograd, 1996, ISBN 86-19-02135-4
- Živi zid (Human Wall), selection, SKZ, Beograd, 1996, ISBN 86-379-0582-X
- Molitva za dečansku ikonu (A Prayer for the Icon of Dečani), Prosveta, Niš, 1998, ISBN 86-7455-379-6
- Hristovi svedoci (Christ's Witnesses), Filip Višnjić, Beograd, 2001, ISBN 86-7363-279-X
- Crnotravske priče (Stories from Crna Trava), selection, Prosveta, Niš, 2002, ISBN 86-7455-557-8
- Vlasinska svadba (Vlasina Wedding), Narodna knjiga, Beograd, 2004, ISBN 86-331-1455-0
- Euridikini prosioci (Eurydice's Suitors), Panorama, Beograd – Priština, 2007, ISBN 978-86-7019-273-7
- Zapisano u snovima (Written in Dreams), stories about love, Panorama, Priština – Beograd, 2013, ISBN 978-86-7019-295-9
- Hvatanje straha (Catching Fear), Panorama, Priština – Beograd, 2015 ISBN 978-86-7019-312-3
- Priče sa krsta (Stories from the cross) Panorama-Jedinstvo, Priština - Kosovska Mitrovica, 2019 ISBN 978-86-7019-326-0

=== Novels ===
- Divlji kalem (Wild Graft), Narodna knjiga, Beograd, 2002, ISBN 86-331-0397-4; and Vranjske knjige, Vranje, 2010, ISBN 978-86-84287-61-0
- Angelus (Angelus), SKZ, Beograd, 2004, ISBN 86-379-0858-6
- Mesečeva lađa (Moon Vessel), Narodna knjiga, Beograd, 2005, ISBN 86-331-2160-3
- Tri hvata neba (Three seizes the sky), Niški kulturni centar, Niš, 2018. ISBN 978-86-6101-161-0

=== Children's literature ===
- Kakvu tajnu kriju ptice (What secrets are hidden by birds), Panorama, Beograd-Kosovska Mitrovica, 2016, ISBN 978-86-7019-314-7
- Priče iz unutrašnjeg džepa (Stories from the inner pocket), Panorama-Jedinstvo, Priština-Kosovska Mitrovica, 2018, ISBN 978-86-7019-321-5

=== Lexicography ===
- Crnotravski rečnik (Crna Trava Terminology), Srpski dijalektološki zbornik no. LVII, SANU – Institut za srpski jezik SANU, Beograd, 2010

=== Non-fiction ===
- Živeti s genocidom, hronika kosovskog beščašća 1980 – 1990 (Living with Genocide, a chronicle of the dishonor of Kosovo 1980 – 1990), Sfairos, Beograd, 1990, ISBN 86-81277-35-9
- Uprkos svemu, 70 godina Narodnog pozorišta u Prištini (Despite all, 70 years of the National Theater in Pristina), Narodno pozorište Priština, Gračanica - Priština, 2019. ISBN 978-86-914293-1-7
- Srpska knjiga na Kosovu i Metohiji 1945-2020 (Serbian Book in Kosovo and Metohija 1945-2020), Alma, Beograd, 2023. ISBN 978-86-6122-103-3
- Kosovska hronika ili letopis "Jedinstva" 1944-2004 (Kosovo chronicle or yearbook "Jedinstva" 1944-2004), Alma, Beograd, 2023. ISBN 978-86-6122-119-4

=== Dramas ===
- Mrtva straža (Deathwatch), Novi svet, Priština, 1993, ISBN 86-7967-002-2
- Krivovo i druge drame (Krivovo and Other Dramas), Panorama, Beograd – Priština, 2003, ISBN 86-7019-238-1

=== Dramas published other than in books ===
- Propast sveta na Veligdan (The End of the World on Easter Day), Teatron, 107, Beograd, 1999
- Sendvič, (Sandwich), Srpski jug, 5, 2006
- Sabor na Gorešnjak (Assembly on the day of Summer Archangel), Riječ/Riječ, godina IV, br. 3 – 4, Brčko, 2009, and Gradina, 37, 2010

=== Performed dramas ===
- Mrtva straža (Deathwatch), Provincial National Theatre, Priština, 1994, directed by Miomir Stamenković
- Propast sveta na Veligdan (The End of the World on Easter Day), "Bora Stanković" Theatre, Vranje1997, directed by Jug Radivojević
- Metohijska ikona (The Icon of Metohija), monodrama, National Theatre, Peć, 1997, directed and played by Miomir Radojković
- Krivovo (Krivovo), "Bora Stanković" Theatre, Vranje, 2003, directed by Jug Radivojević

=== Radio drama ===
- Poslednji pogled na Dragodan (A Final Look at Dragodan), directed and played by Stevan Đorđević, Radio Priština – Radio Toplica, Prokuplje, 2004

=== Journal editor ===
- Tri veka seoba Srba (Three Centuries of the Great Migration of the Serbs),1990
- Vidovdanski glasnik, 1993
- Srpski jug, 2004 – 2006

== Awards ==
- Annual award "Jedinstvo" for journalism, 1981 and 1982
- Stevan Sremac Award for newspaper article, 1987, 1991 and 1992
- Lazar Vučković Award, for poetry1985 and short story1992
- Zlatno pero despota Stefana Lazarevića (Despot Stefan Lazarević Golden Pen), 1990
- Milutin Uskoković, second, 1993 and 2000
- Literary Society Award of Kosovo and Metohija for best book, 1999
- Laza K. Lazarević Award, 2001
- Rade Drainac Award, 2004
- Special Award of the "Joakim Vujić" Professional Theatre Festival of Serbia, 2000

== See also ==
- Darinka Jevrić
- Lazar Vučković
- Vukašin Filipović

== Literature ==
- Julie Mertus: Kosovo: how myths and truths started a war, Univerzitety of California Press, Berkeley / Los Angeles / London, 1999, pp. 119 and 348
- Elsie, Robert (2004). Historical Dictionary of Kosova. Lanham, Maryland: Scarecrow Press. ISBN 9780810853096.
- Cindi Tino-Sandoval: Yorba Linda, Columbia University Press, New York, 2005, pp. 530 – 531
- Narativna gramatika, književni svet Radosava Stojanovića u svetlu kritike, Niški kulturni centar – Filozofski fakultet u Nišu, Niš, 2016
- Enciklopedija srpskog naroda, Zavod za udžbenike, Beograd, 2008, p 1100
- Staniša Vojinović: Bibliografija Radosava Stojanovića, Vlasotinački zbornik, no. 3, Vlasotince, 2009, pp. 494 – 534,
- Slobodan Simonović: Enciklopedija Kruševca i okoline, Kruševac, 2011, pp. 430 – 431,
- Enciklopedija Niša, kultura, Centar za naučna istraživanja SANU i Univerziteta u Nišu, Niš, 2011, pp. 440–441
- Danilo Kocić, Leskovačački pisci i njihovo doba(I – II) Leskovac, 2016
- Ismet Markoviq: Stojanoviq (Stojanović) Radosav (1950), Fjalori enciklopedik i Kosoves, II L-ZH, Akademia e skencave dhe e arteve e Kosoves, Priština 2018, стр. 1535;
