= Šćepanović =

Šćepanović is a Slavic surname of Montenegrin origin. Notable people with the surname include:

- Aleksandar Šćepanović (born 1982), Croatian basketballer
- Blažo Šćepanović (1934–1966), Montenegrin writer
- Branimir Šćepanović (1937–2020), Serbian writer
- Marko Šćepanović (born 1982), Montenegrin footballer
- Miloš Šćepanović (born 1982), Montenegrin water polo player
- Nebojša Šćepanović (born 1967), Montenegrin footballer
- Vlado Šćepanović (born 1975), Montenegrin basketball player
- Vučina Šćepanović (born 1982), Serbian footballer
