= Lazar Vučković =

Serbian poet (1937-1966)

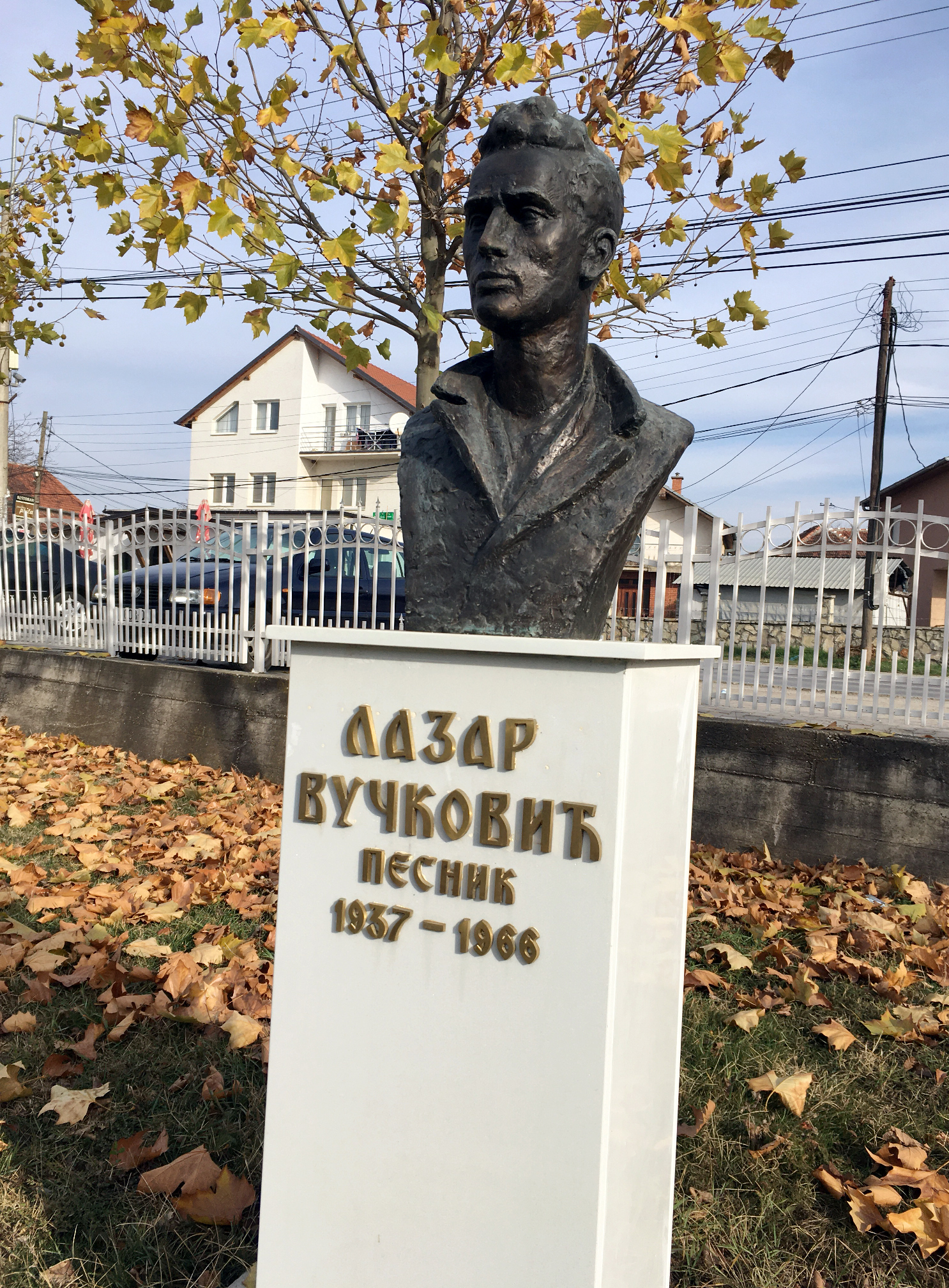
- A bust of Vučković in Gračanica
- Born: 1937; Gornje Selo, Prizren, Kingdom of Yugoslavia
- Died: 26 August 1966 (aged 28–29); Struga, SR Macedonia, SFR Yugoslavia

Lazar Vučković (1937 – 26 August 1966) was a Serbian and Yugoslav poet. Along with poets and writers Petar Šarić, Vukašin Filipović, Darinka Jevrić, Radosav Stojanović and Vladan Virijević, he is considered one of the leading 20th-century Serbian writers from Kosovo and Metohija.

== Biography ==
He grew up in Gornje Selo, near Sredska, on the slopes of the Šar Mountains, where he finished elementary school. He studied high school in Ferizaj. He was a journalist and reporter for the "Jedinstvo" newspaper in Priština. He was one of the first Serbian post-war poets in Kosovo and Metohija. He also wrote stories and poeticized reports for the newspaper Jedinstvo. He published his first works in Jedinstvo and the magazines Stremljenja, Omladini, Mladosti, Susretima, Jeta e re, Rilindja, Odjek.

Vučković drowned in Lake Ohrid together with the Montenegrin poet Blažo Šćepanović, at a time when they were participating in the Struga Poetry Evenings, in the summer of 1966. Another Serbian poet, Oskar Davičo, who was with them also fell in the water when the boat capsized but survived because he knew how to swim; unfortunately, Vučković and Šćepanović did not.

== Legacy ==
"Lazar Vučković Days of Poetry" are held annually each summer in Serbia to commemorate his accomplishments in literature.

In September 1969, a bust was unveiled in his hometown of Gornje Selo, in the parish of Sredac, and where the first Poetry Meetings "Lazar Vučković" were held.

On Christmas 2014, a bust was stolen from the monument to Lazar Vučković which had been erected by the staff of the newspaper Jedinstvo at the cemetery in Gornje Selo, the poet's birthplace.

== Works ==
- Touch of Summer, poetry (together with Radoslav Zlatanović and Božidar Milidragović), Jedinstvo, Priština, 1962
- The Lost Sea, poetry, Jedinstvo, Priština, 1966
- Vjersha ("Verses"), poetry (in Albanian, together with Rade Nikolić and Radoslav Zlatanović), Rilindja, Priština, 1966
- Pesme ("Poetry": collected poems), Jedinstvo, Priština, 1976
- Proza ("Prose": collected stories, reports and criticism), Jedinstvo, Priština, 1980
- Pesme ("Poems": selected poetry with a critical discussion by Prof. Dr. Novica Petković), BIGZ - Jedinstvo, Belgrade - Priština, 1986
- A survey of modern poetry from Kosovo (1988)
- Oluja i dom: izabrane pesme (1997)

== Literature ==
- Radomir Ivanović: Književno stvaralaštvo Kosova na srpskohrvatskom jeziku, Zajednica naučnih ustanova Kosova, Priština, 1971 / Радомир Ивановић: Књижевно стваралаштво Косова на српскохрватском језику, Заједница научних установа Косова, Приштина, 1971
- Radomir Ivanović: "Believer of Poetry", preface to the book Lazar Vučković: Poetry, Jedinstvo, Priština, 1976 / Радомир Ивановић: Верник поезије, предговор књизи Лазар Вучковић: „Поезија“, Јединство, Приштина, 1976
- Novica Petković: "Poetry handful of Lazar Vučković", preface to the book Lazar Vucković: Poems, BIGZ - Jedinstvo, Belgrade - Priština, 1986 / Новица Петковић: "Песничка прегршт Лазара Вучковића", поговор књизи Лазар Вучковић: Песме, БИГЗ - Јединство, Београд - Приштина, 1986.
- Prose (collected stories, reports and criticism), Jedinstvo, Priština, 1977.
- Poems (selected poetry with a critical discussion by Prof. Dr. Novica Petković), BIGZ - Jedinstvo, Belgrade - Priština, 1986.
