= Stanoc i Epërm =

Bletajë: Stanoc i Epërm (Albanian); Горње Становце/Gornje Stanovce (Serbian)
- Village
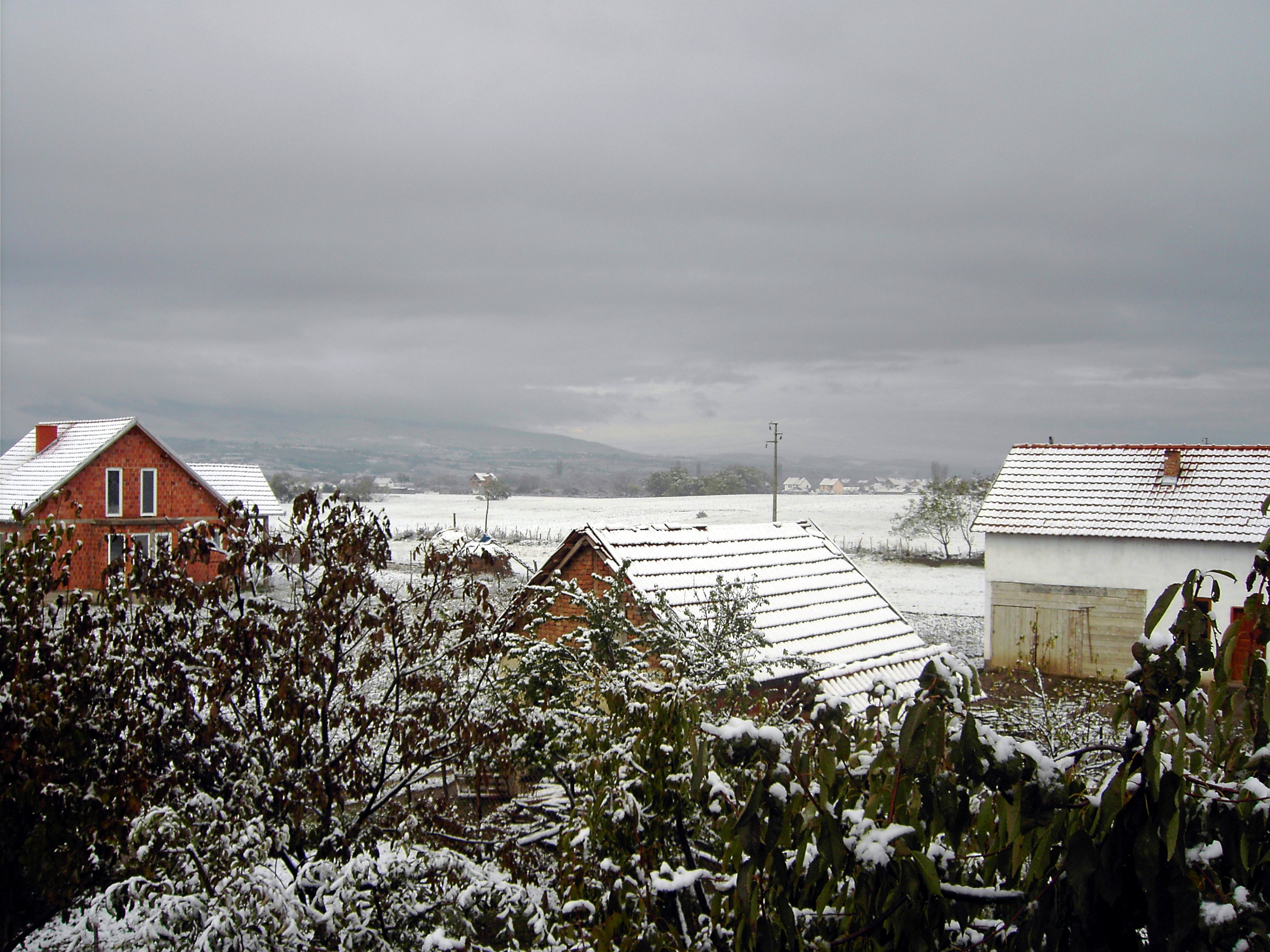

- Location within Kosovo
- Coordinates: 42.761122°N 21.051346°E
- Location: Kosovo
- District: Mitrovicë
- Municipality: Vushtrri
- Elevation: 559 m (1,834 ft)

Population (2011)
  - Total: 2,501
- Time zone: UTC+1 (CET)
  - Summer (DST): UTC+2 (CEST)

Bletajë, formerly known as Stanoci i Epërm (Albanian: Stanoc i Epërm, Serbian Cyrillic: Горње Становце/Gornje Stanovce) until 1999 is a village in Vushtrri municipality, Kosovo.

From 1864 up until the Kosovo War, the village housed a large Circassian community. When the war broke out, however, the Circassian residents were evacuated to the Adyghe Republic, which is their original homeland.

== See also ==
- Vushtrri
- Stanoc i Poshtëm
- Circassians in Kosovo
