= Stanoc i Poshtëm =

Buzëlumi: Stanoc i Poshtëm (Albanian); Доње Становце/Donje Stanovce (Serbian)
- Village
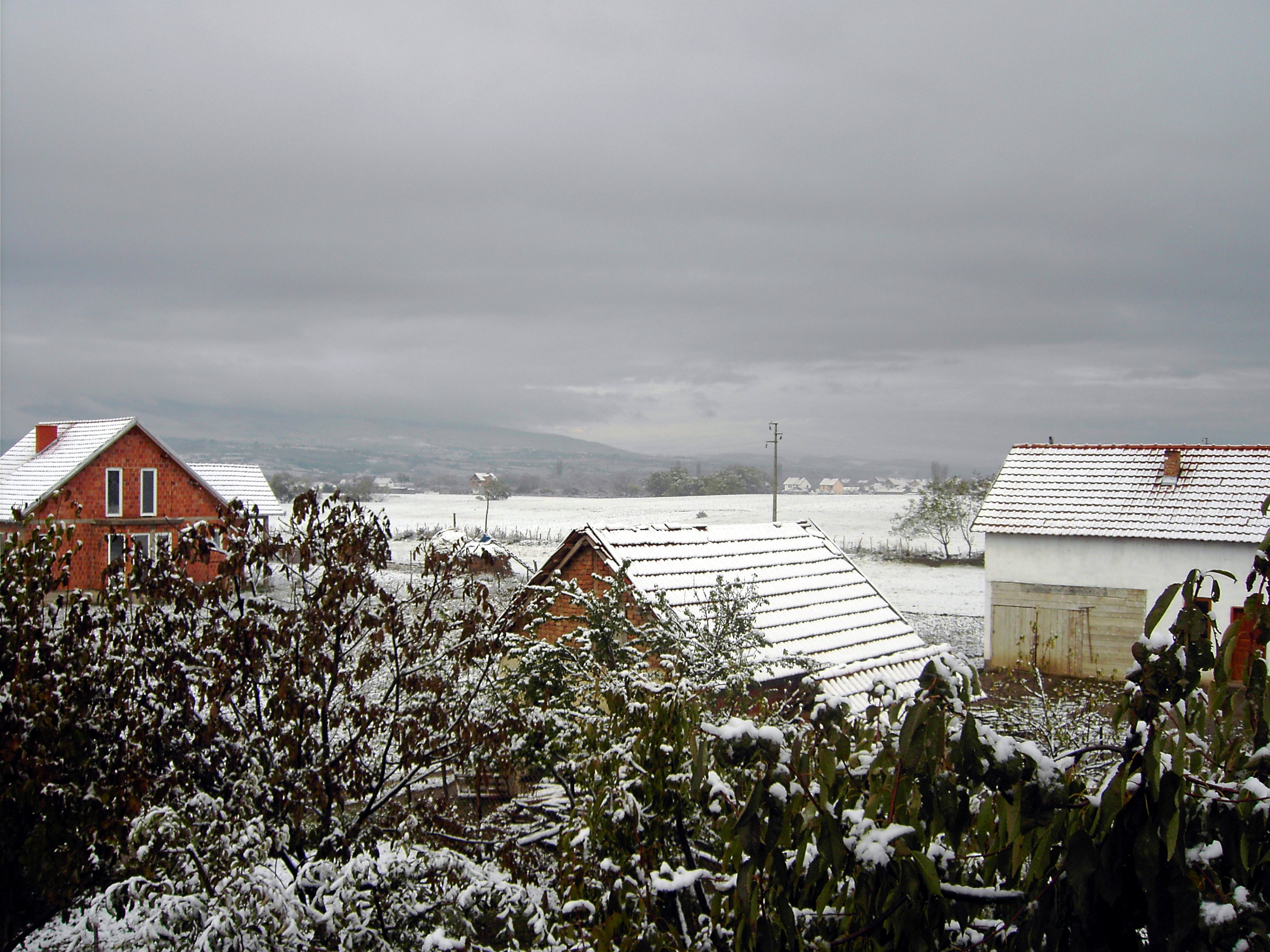

- Location within Kosovo
- Location: Kosovo
- District: Mitrovicë
- Municipality: Vushtrri

Population (2011)
  - Total: 4,237
- Time zone: UTC+1 (CET)
  - Summer (DST): UTC+2 (CEST)

Buzëlumi, officially known until 1999 as Stanoc i Poshtëm (Serbian: Доње Становце, romanized: Donje Stanovce) is a village in Vushtrri municipality, in Kosovo. It is located near the city of Vushtrri in the Mitrovica District of northeastern Kosovo. Together with the Upper Stanovc they made Stanoc, as a biggest villages in Kosovo. Stanovc is situated between the river Sitnica and the Pristina-Mitrovica road. It is approximately 15 km (9 mi) from the Pristina.

The village has a population of about 3700, and the land is mainly used for agriculture.

The mountain of Çyçavica rises to a height of 1,091 m (3,579 ft) to the west of the village.

The village housed a large Circassian population until the Kosovo War, when they were evacuated to Mafekhabl.

== See also ==
- Vushtrri
- Stanoc i Epërm
- Circassians in Kosovo
