= Circassians in Kosovo =

Ethnic group in Kosovo

Çerkezët në Kosovë (Albanian) Черкези на Косову (Serbian) Косовам ис Адыгэхэр (Adyghe)
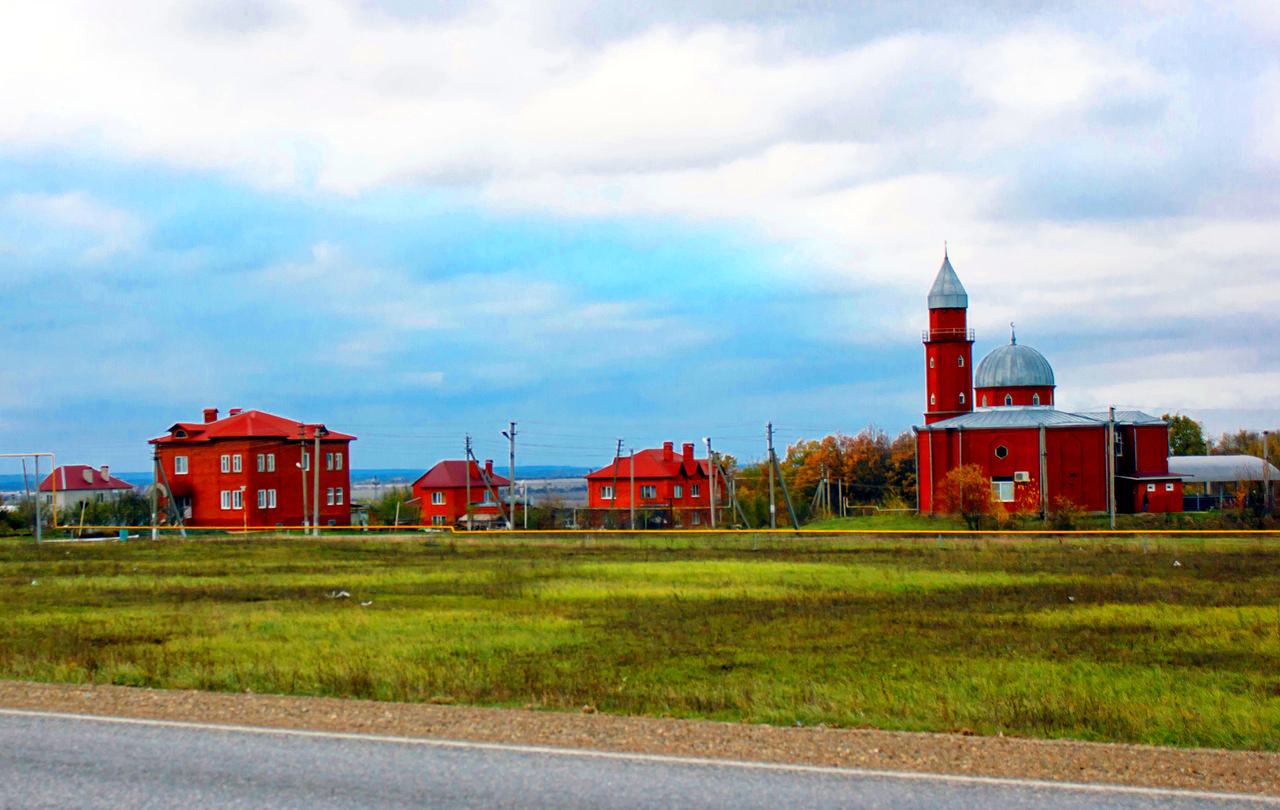
- The village of Mafekhabl, which was founded by the Kosovo Circassians who returned to the Caucasus

Total population
- 40,000 (1870); 6,400 (1890); 200 (1998)

Regions with significant populations
- Mitrovica District (formerly); Mafekhabl, Adygea (present)

Languages
- Circassian, Albanian, Serbo-Croatian, Russian

Religion
- Sunni Islam

Related ethnic groups
- other Circassians

The Circassians in Kosovo (Note: Adyghe: Косовам ис Адыгэхэр, romanized: Kosovam yis Adıgexer; Albanian: Çerkezët në Kosovë; Serbian: Черкези на Косову, romanized: Čerkezi na Kosovu) were a group of the Circassian people who lived in Kosovo beginning in the mid-19th century, when they were exiled during the Circassian genocide to the Ottoman Empire after the Russo-Circassian War. During this time, the Circassians in Kosovo were from three of the twelve Adyghe tribes: the Abаdzeh, Shapsug and Ubykh. In 1998 they numbered 200.

== History ==
=== Arrival in Kosovo ===
After the Circassian genocide following the Russo-Circassian War, large number of Circassians were exiled to the Ottoman Empire, including in Kosovo. Between 1858 and 1862, 6,000 Circassian families settled in Kosovo. Other Circassians were settled in Niš and Prokuplje between 1862 and 1863. Around 12,000 Circassians were once again sent to Kosovo and Serbia in following months. In total, 40,000 Circassians were settled in Kosovo alone.

The Ottoman Empire aimed to make life easier for the newly arrived Circassians, and did not tax them and they were provided with materials to farm with. The Circassians were not well received by both Albanians and Serbs. Both Albanians and Serbs considered the Circassians to be wild and primitive Barbarians. People of the Kosovo region as well as some regional governors helped Circassians. Since there was no mosque in Babimusa at the time, where more than 200 Circassian families were settled, the local administration started to work on the construction of a mosque at the end of 1864.

=== Decrease in population ===
==== Majority leaving the region (1877–1878) ====
The Circassians in Bulgaria fiercely opposed the Bulgarian Revolt in 1876. Kosovo Circassians also joined the Bulgarian Circassians. European countries in turn demanded that the Circassians leave the region.

Circassians sided with the Ottoman army during the Russo-Turkish War (1877–1878). After the war, the Circassians were seen as a "Muslim threat" and expelled from Kosovo, Bulgaria and other parts of the Balkans by Russian armies following the end of the Russo-Turkish war. They were not allowed to return, so the Ottoman authorities settled them in new other lands such as in modern Jordan (see Circassians in Jordan), where they would have conflict with Bedouin Arabs, and Turkey (see Circassians in Turkey).

==== Last remnants leaving for Adygea (1998-1999) ====
As a small community, the Circassians in Kosovo successfully managed coexistence and securing adequate means of living. Good relations with both Serbs and Albanians were sought, although they often maintained closer ties with Albanians due to cultural and religious similarities, which is also why intermarriage was not uncommon. When the Kosovo War began, Aslan Dzharimov appealed to officials for the repatriation of the Kosovo Circassians, ultimately resulting in their emigration to their ancestral homeland, Republic of Adygea, where they founded a village named Mafekhabl near the republic's capital of Maykop. Muammar Gaddafi sent support and donations to the village. Gaddafi, according to his own words, showed a deep respect for the Circassians and their historical suffering.

== Known families ==
Below is a list of some of the Circassian families who live or have lived in Kosovo.

- Abadze (Абадзэ)
- Gut (Гут)
- Makho (Махо)
- Sheudzhen (Шэуджэн)
- Tsey (Цей)
- Tyghuzh (Тыгъужъ)
- Jeu (Жьэу)

== Settlements ==
Towns and villages where Circassians were once present include Lumadh, Stanoc i Epërm, Stanoc i Poshtëm.
