= Sehadete Mekuli =

Albanian physician

- Born: Sehadete Doko; October 16, 1928; Ohrid, Kingdom of Serbs, Croats and Slovenes
- Died: November 12, 2013 (aged 85); Pristina, Kosovo
- Education: Ss. Cyril and Methodius University of Skopje
- Occupations: Physician, professor
- Known for: Treating injured students of the 1981 protests in Kosovo
- Spouse: Esad Mekuli
- Children: 2

Sehadete Mekuli (16 October 1928 – 12 November 2013), also spelled Sadete Mekuli, was a Yugoslavian-born Albanian gynecologist, professor, and public figure. She became known for tending to the injured students of the 1981 protests in Kosovo, when Albanians demanded more autonomy within the Yugoslav federation. As a result of her actions, she was denied a full professorship at the University of Pristina School of Medicine and was forced into early retirement in 1988. She is the inspiration for the character of Teuta Shkreli in Ismail Kadare's 1985 novel The Wedding Procession Turned to Ice (Albanian: Krushqit jane te ngrire).

== Biography ==
She was born Sehadete Doko on 16 October 1928 in Koroshishta, Struga, Kingdom of Yugoslavia (now in North Macedonia). She pursued secondary studies in 1947 in her native city and then studied medicine in the Ss. Cyril and Methodius University of Skopje, graduating on 7 January 1954. On 1 April 1954, she started to work in the Hospital of Pristina as a gynecologist and obstetrician. Mekuli specialized in gynecology in March 1960 in Belgrade. From 1960 until 1962 she was the Chief of the Gynecology and Obstetrics Pavilion of the Pristina Hospital. In 1963, for political reasons, she left the hospital and became Chief of the Dispensary (a public dispensary), within the House of Health of Pristina. In January 1968, she returned to her position as Chief of the Gynecology and Obstetrics Pavilion in the Pristina Hospital. She also developed a lecture series for schools and dormitories to improve the health education of girls.

After the opening of the University of Pristina, Mekuli was elected primarius of the School of Medicine which opened in 1970. She earned her doctorate at the University of Belgrade in 1973 and became an associate professor at the University of Pristina in 1976. Mekuli participated in the founding of the Association of Kosovo's Physicians and directed the publishing of Praxis medica, a medicine journal. Beginning in 1972, she was director of the Gynecology Clinic within the School of Medicine of the University of Pristina. Mekuli published 31 articles in medical journals.

=== 1981 protests in Kosovo ===
In 1981 Mekuli tended to the Albanian students injured by the police during the 1981 protests in Kosovo, when the Albanians were demanding more autonomy within Yugoslavia. She was accused of "showing too much zeal" in treating the wounded and siding with the students in their demands as well. Because of her actions, the University of Pristina refused to promote her to full professor, and she was forced into early retirement in October 1988. Following the dissolution of Kosovo in 1989, all health workers in the clinic were expelled. In 1996 Mekuli opened a gynecology and obstetrics clinic in conjunction with the Mother Teresa charity organization, which brought in gynecologists from around Kosovo to treat women.

Her work and figure inspired the character of Teuta Shkreli in Ismail Kadare's novel The Wedding Procession Turned to Ice (Albanian: Krushqit jane te ngrire).

== Personal life ==
Mekuli was the wife of Albanian poet Esad Mekuli (1916–1993). She died in Pristina in November 12, 2013 and was survived by her two children.
