= Mlačište =

Mlačište Млачиште (Serbian)
- Village
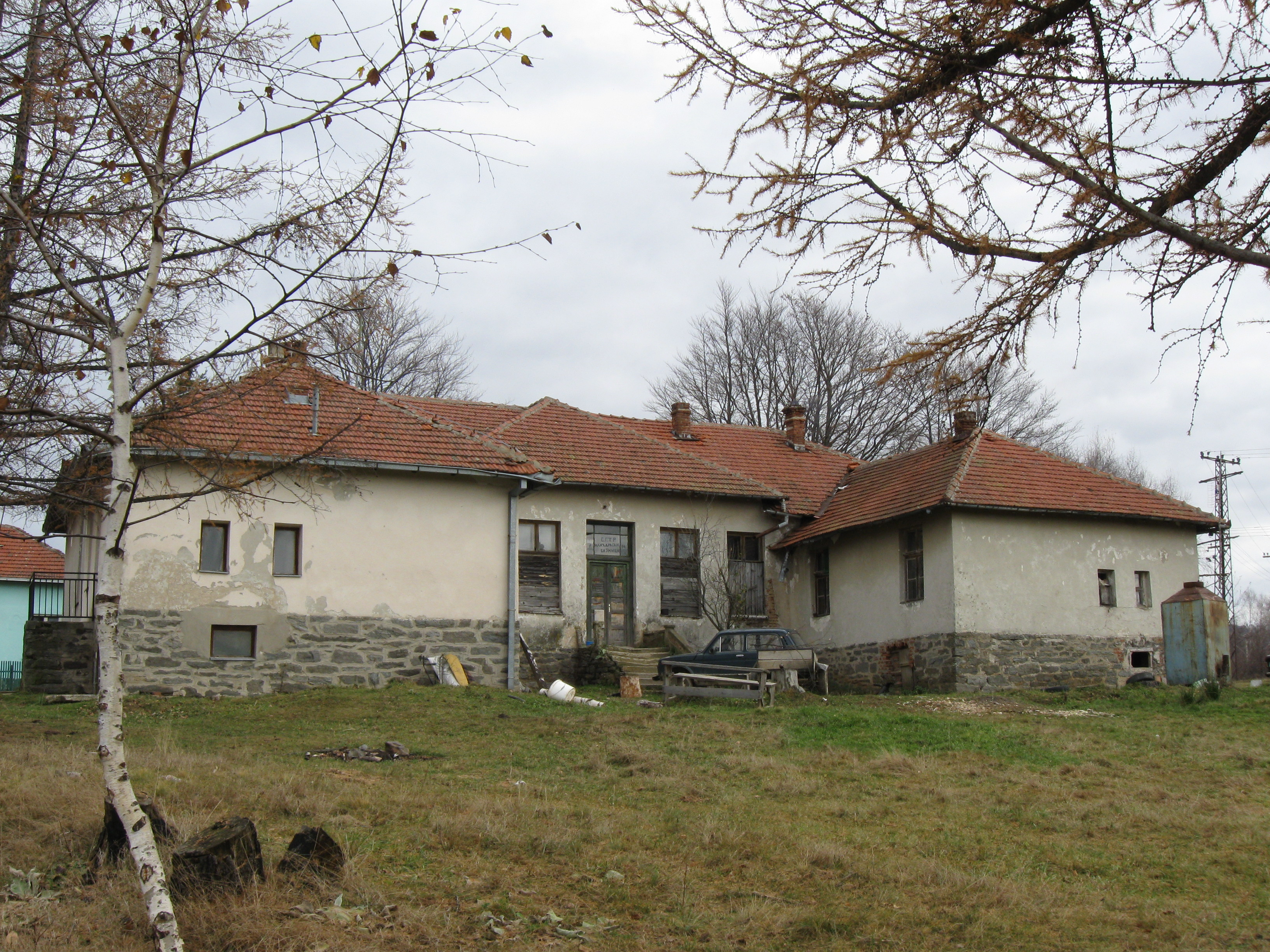
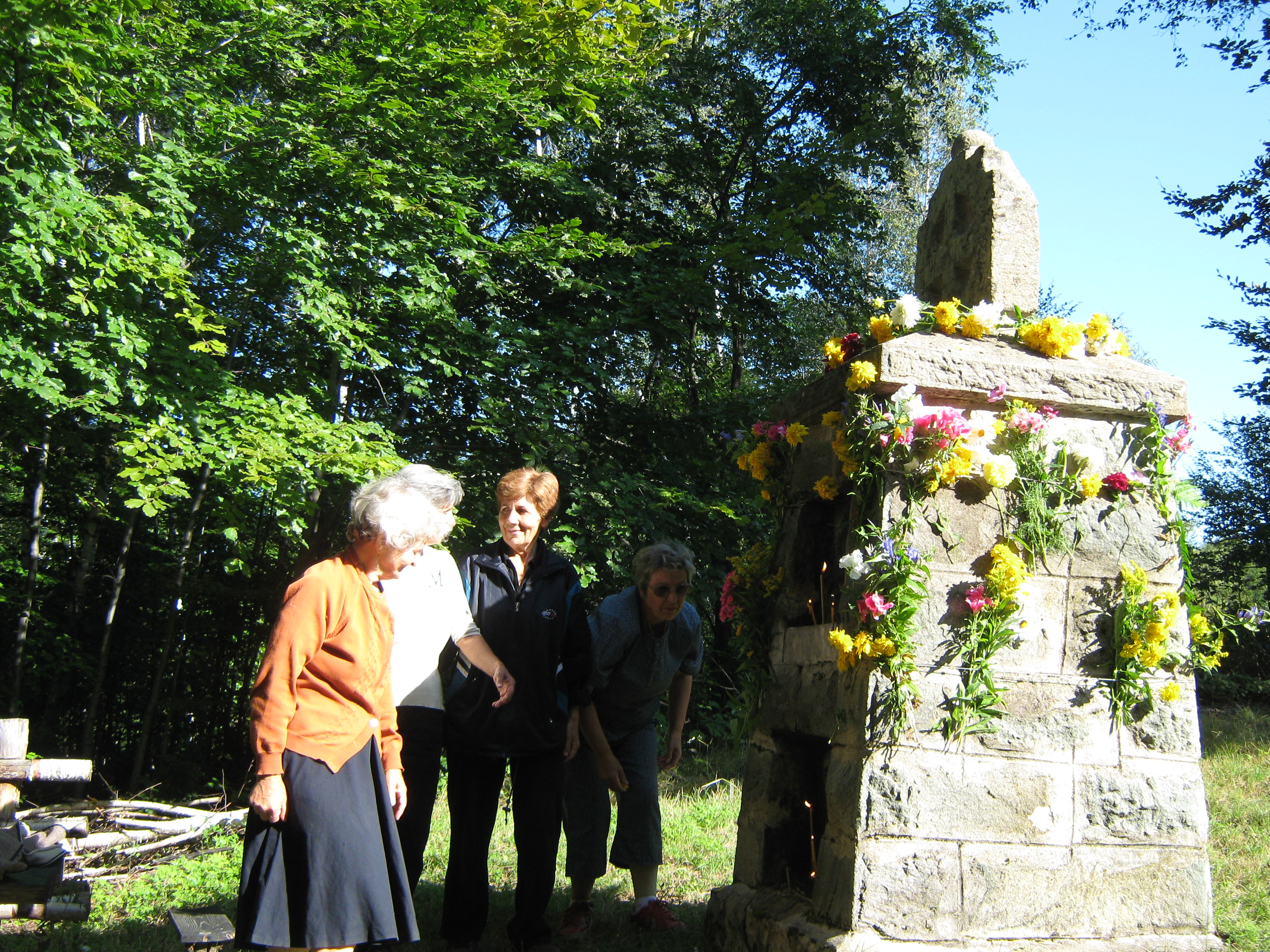
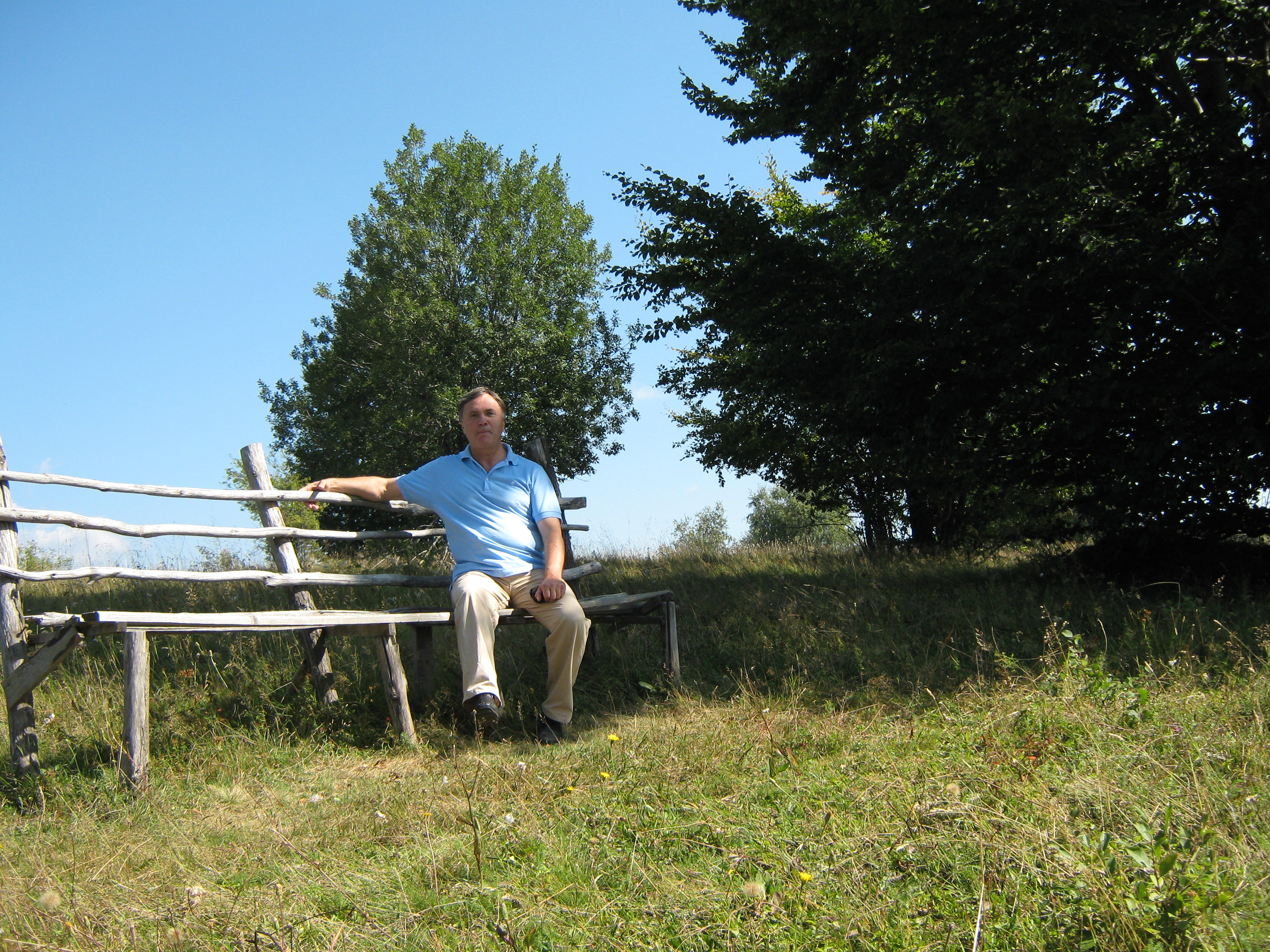
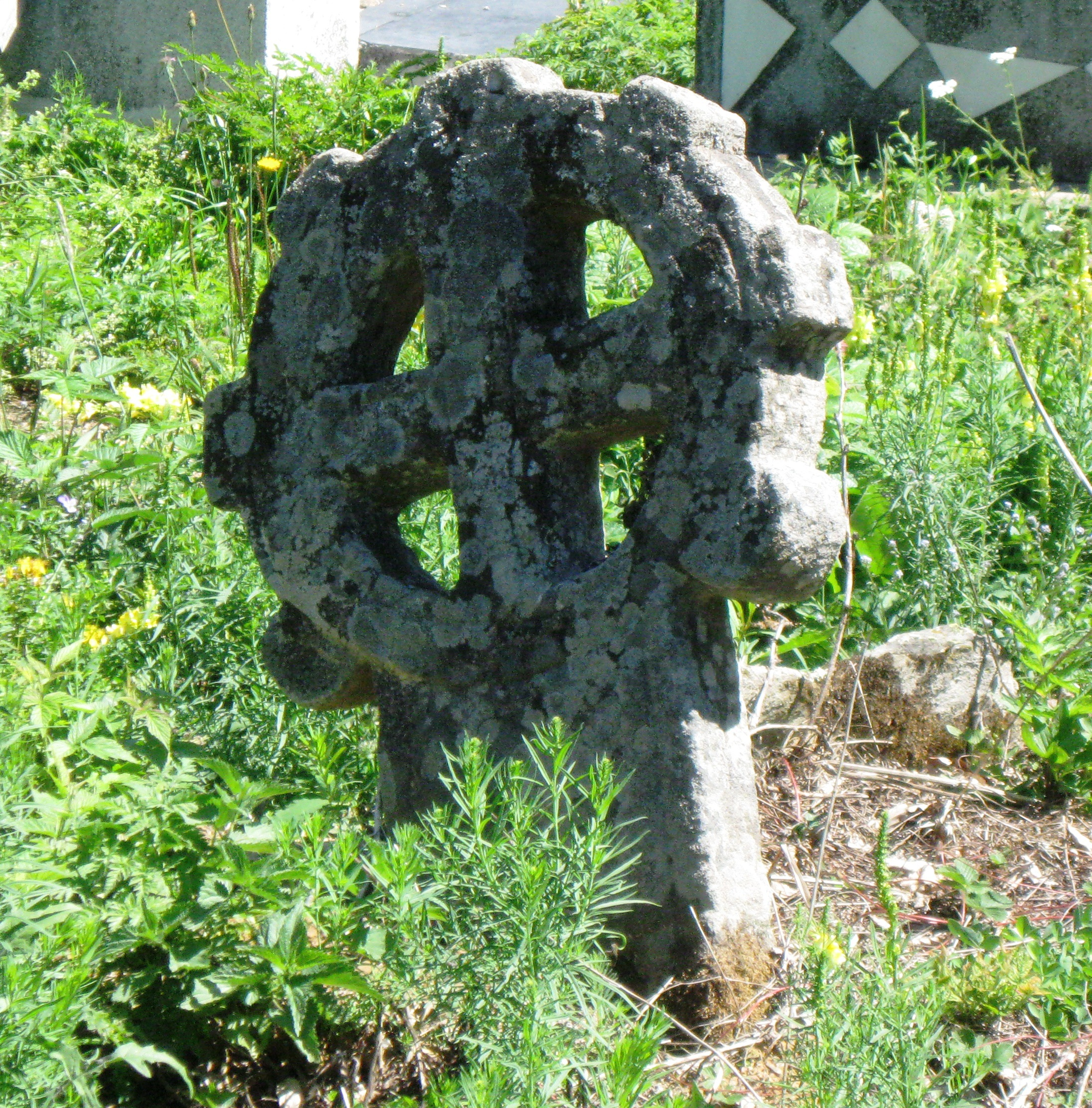
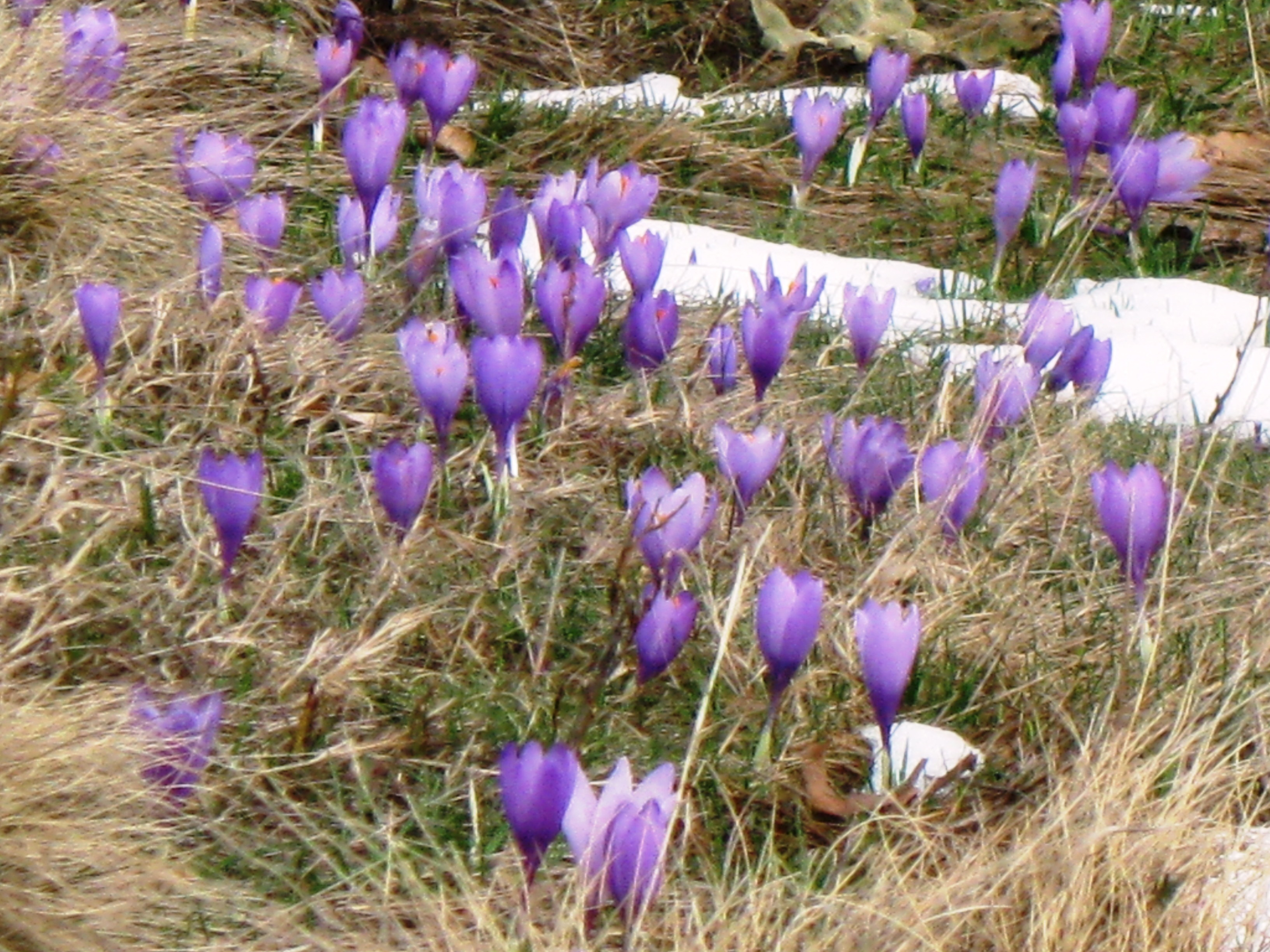
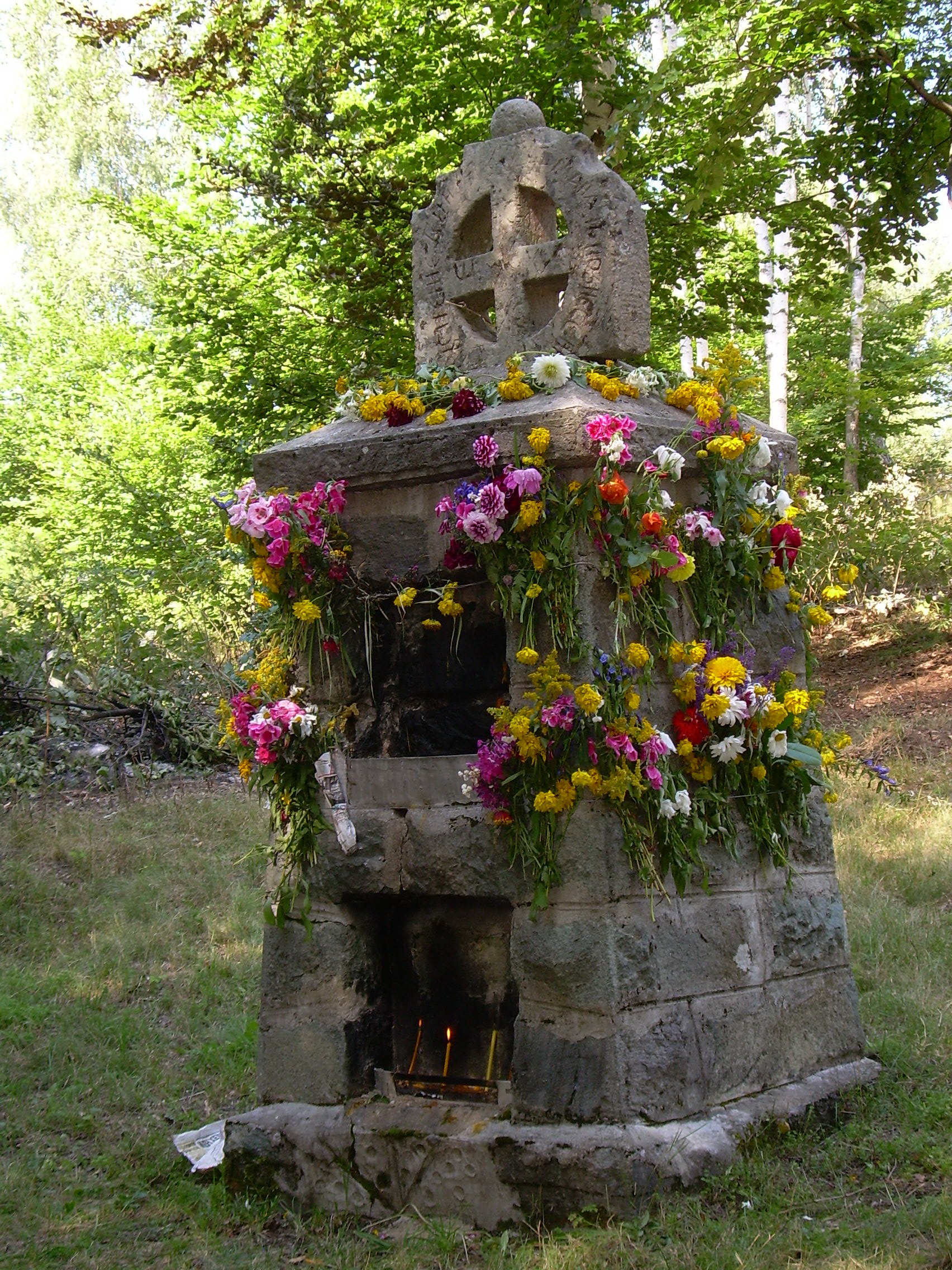
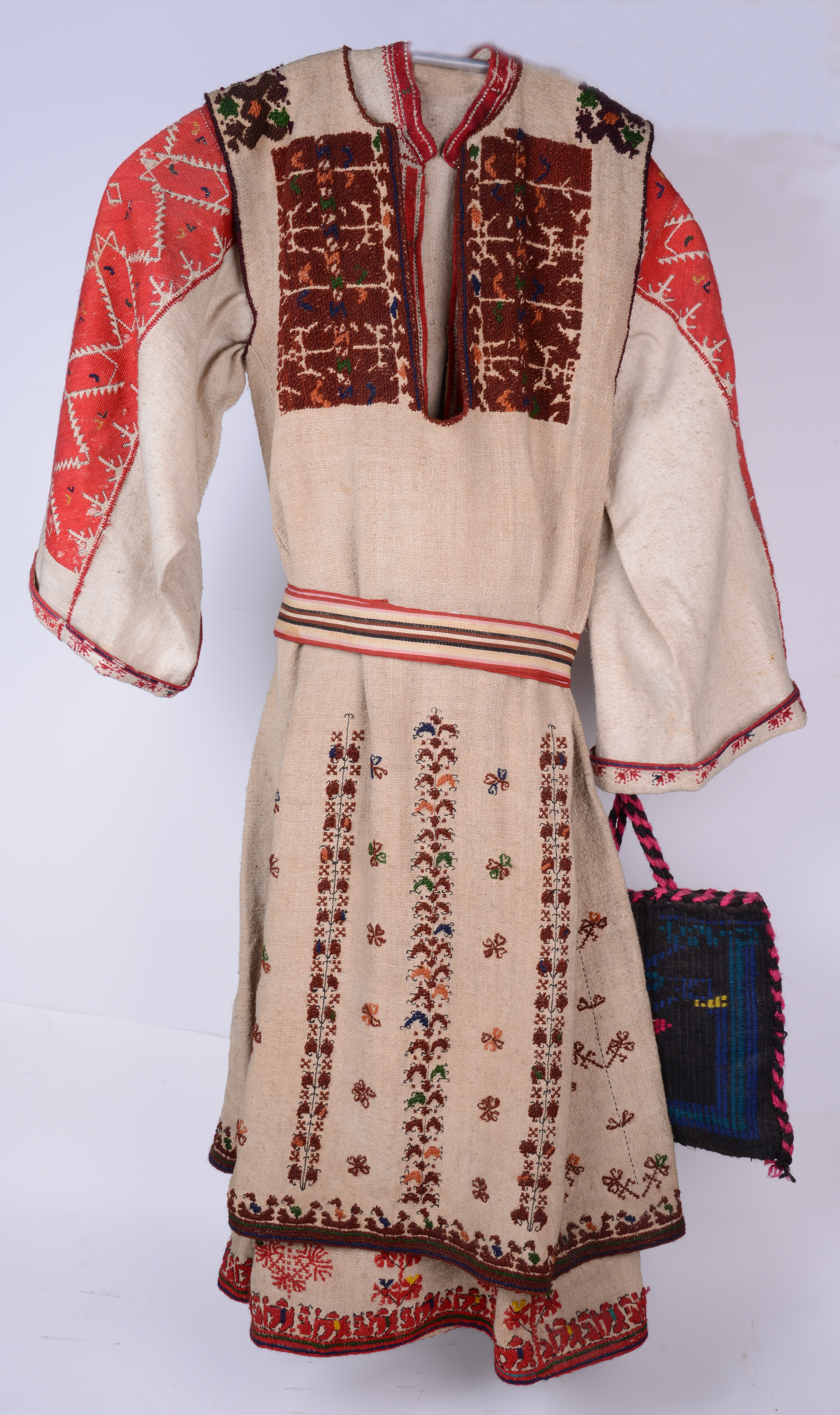
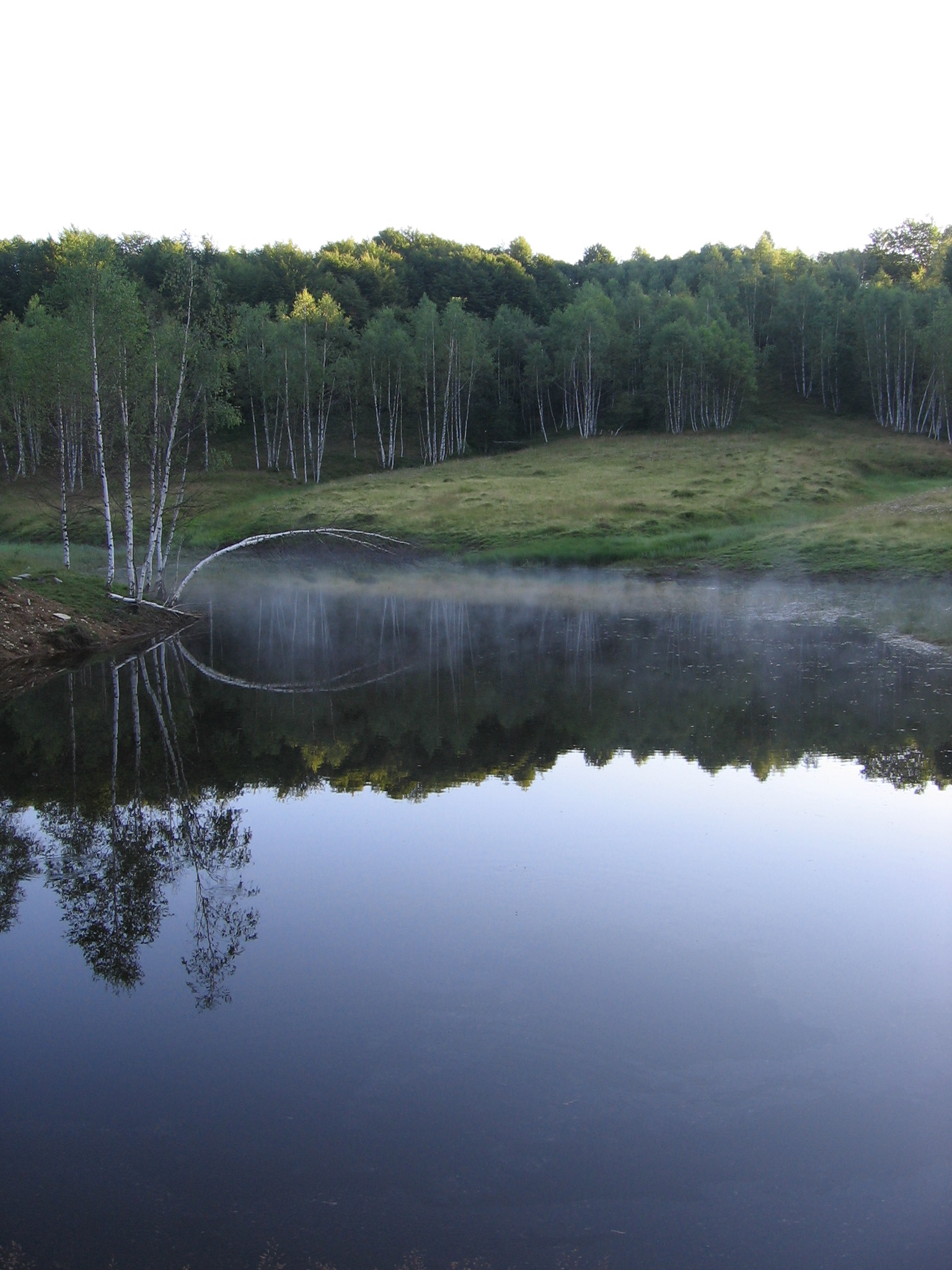

- Location within Serbia
- Coordinates: 42°47′19″N 22°13′28″E
- Country: Serbia
- District: Jablanica District
- Municipality: Crna Trava

Population (2002)
  - Total: 29
- Time zone: UTC+1 (CET)
  - Summer (DST): UTC+2 (CEST)

Mlačište (Serbian Cyrillic: Млачиште) is a village in the municipality of Crna Trava, Serbia. According to the 2002 census, the village has a population of 29 people. 15 tumuli have been found but not excavated on the Mali Čemernik (Čemernik).
