= Din Mehmeti =

Albanian poet and writer from Kosovo (1929–2010)

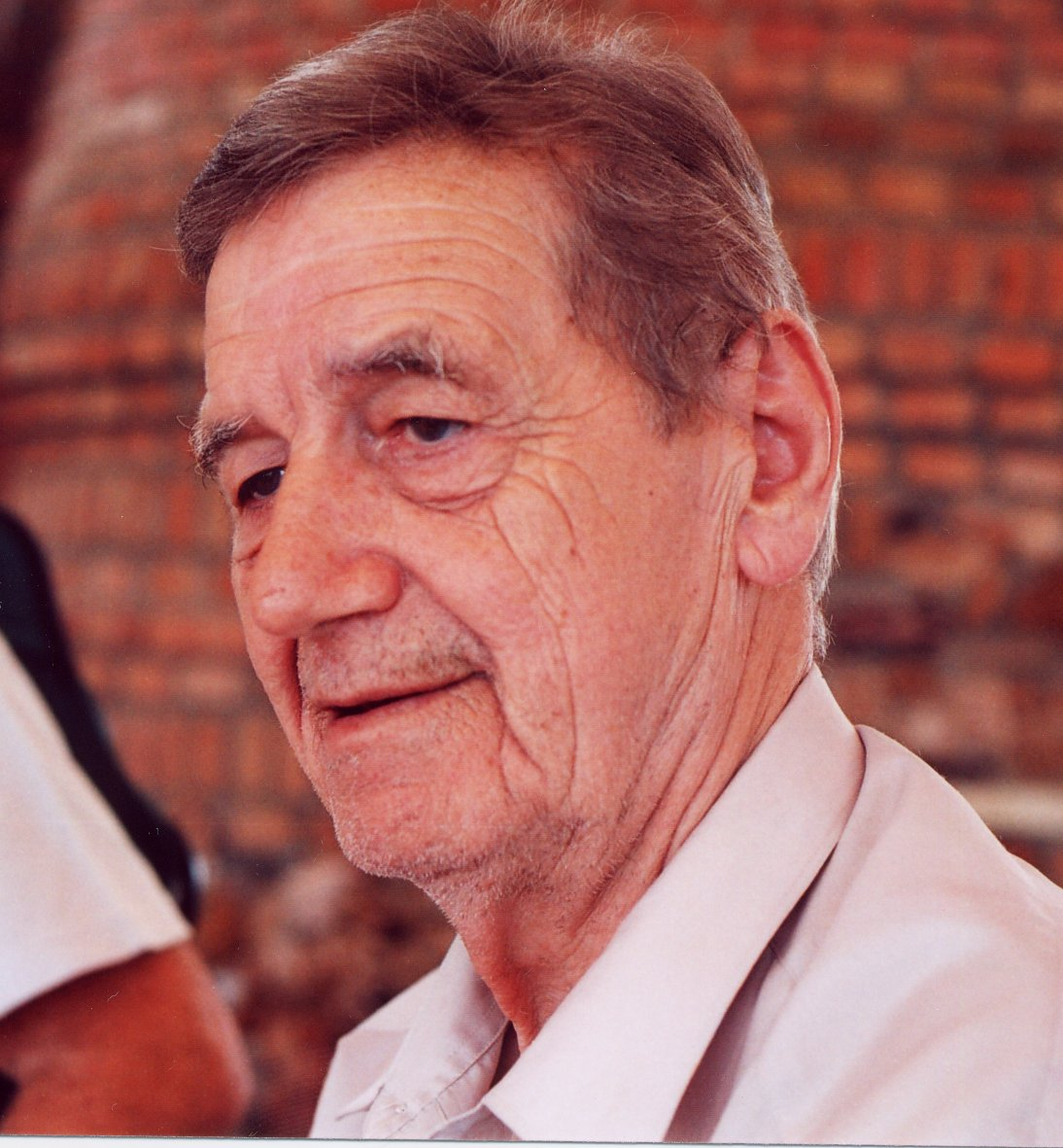
- Mehmeti in 2006
- Born: 1932; Gjocaj (sq), Kingdom of Yugoslavia
- Died: 12 November 2010 (aged 77–78); Gjakova, Kosovo
- Education: University of Belgrade
- Occupations: poet, writer
- Writing career
- Language: Albanian
- Period: 1961–2001

Din Mehmeti (1932 – 12 November 2010) was an Albanian poet from Kosovo. He was among the best-known classical representatives of contemporary verse in Kosovo.

== Career ==
Mehmeti was born in 1932 in Gjocaj, Junik, near Gjakova, Kosovo, and attended the University of Belgrade for Albanian language and literature.

== Bibliography ==
- Në krahët e shkrepave (1961)
- Rini diellore (1966)
- Dridhjet e dritës (1969)
- Heshtja e kallur (1972)
- Fanar në furtuna (1981)
- Agu, dramë (1982)
- Prapë fillimi (1996)
- Klithmë është emri im (Tirana, 2002)
- Mos vdis kur vdiset (2001)
