= Nebojša Šćepanović =

Montenegrin footballer

Personal information
- Full name: Nebojša Šćepanović
- Date of birth: 4 December 1967 (age 58)
- Place of birth: Kolašin, SR Montenegro, SFR Yugoslavia
- Height: 1.81 m (5 ft 11 in)
- Position: Midfielder

Senior career*
Years	Team	Apps	(Gls)
1987–1988	Priština	8	(0)
1988–1990	Budućnost Titograd	5	(0)
1990–1993	Sutjeska Nikšić	64	(8)
1993–1994	Hajduk Kula	28	(2)
1994–1995	Vojvodina	25	(9)
1995–1996	Oviedo	7	(0)
1996	→ Villarreal (loan)	9	(1)
1998	Paniliakos	15	(0)
2000	Kozani		
Total		161+	(20+)
- * Club domestic league appearances and goals

Nebojša Šćepanović (Serbian Cyrillic: Небојша Шћепановић; born 4 December 1967) is a Montenegrin former professional footballer who played as a midfielder.

== Career ==
Šćepanović made his Yugoslav First League debut with Priština in the 1987–88 season. He subsequently spent two years at Budućnost Titograd.

In September 1995, Šćepanović was transferred to La Liga side Oviedo. He, however, failed to make an impact with the Asturian team and was eventually loaned to Segunda División club Villarreal in January 1996.
