= Eqrem Basha =

Albanian poet and writer

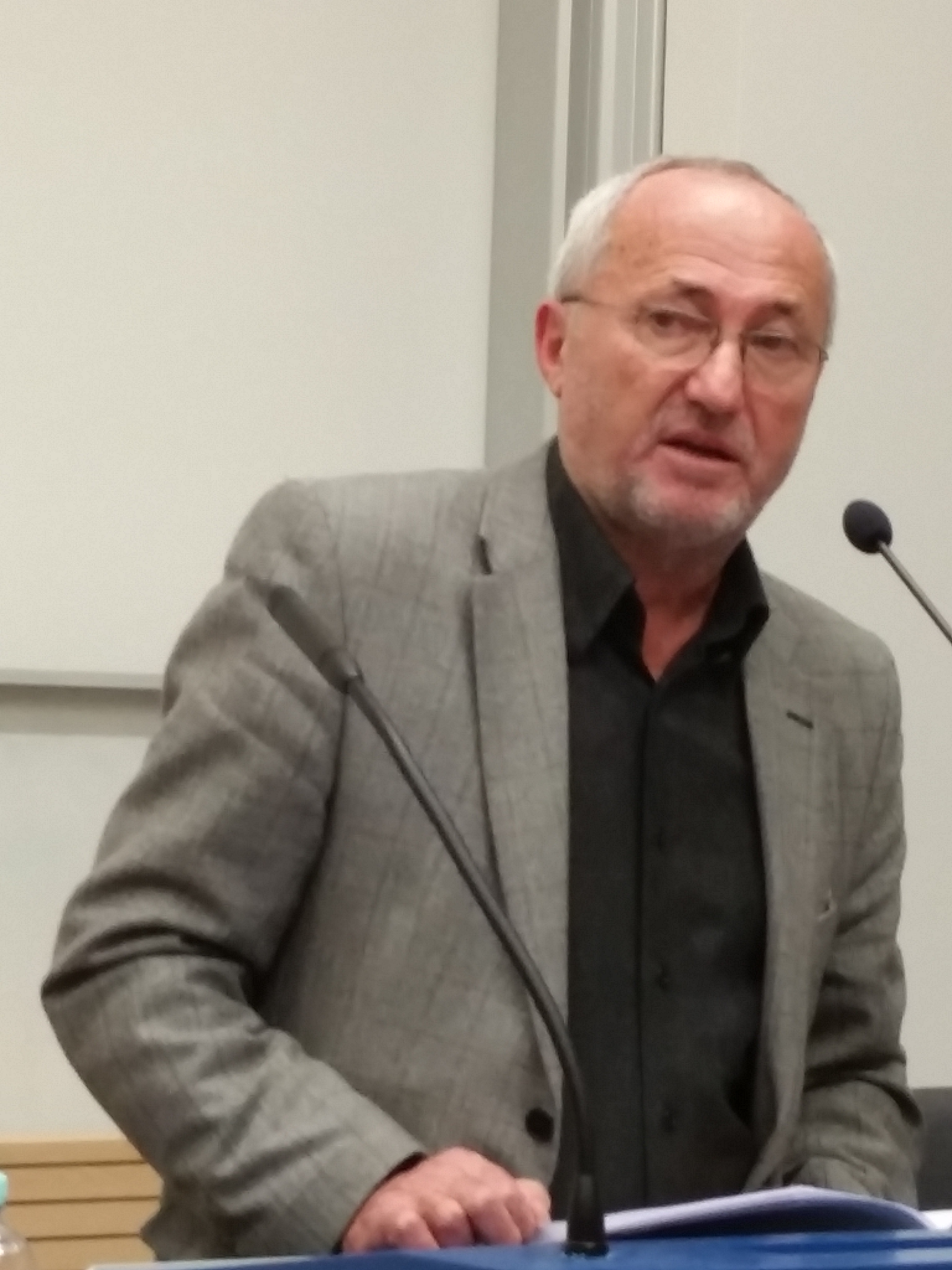
- Born: 1948 (age 77–78); Debar, PR Macedonia, FPR Yugoslavia
- Education: University of Pristina
- Occupation: Writer

Eqrem Basha (Macedonian: Еќрем Баша, Ećrem Baša) (born 1948 in Debar, PR Macedonia, FPR Yugoslavia) is writer from Kosovo. He is the author of eight volumes of innovative verse, three volumes of short stories and numerous translations.
