= Blažo Šćepanović =

Montenegrin and Yugoslav writer

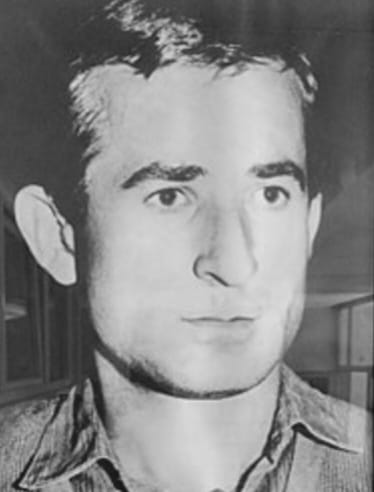
- Born: 7 April 1934; Bijelo Polje, Kingdom of Yugoslavia
- Died: 26 August 1966 (aged 32); Struga, SR Macedonia, SFR Yugoslavia
- Resting place: Belgrade New Cemetery
- Education: University of Belgrade Faculty of Philosophy
- Occupation: Writer
- Writing career
- Language: Serbo-Croatian
- Genre: Poetry
- Notable work: Smrću protiv smrti

Blažo Šćepanović (Serbian Cyrillic: Блажо Шћепановић; 7 April 1934 – 26 August 1966) was a Montenegrin and Yugoslav writer.

== Biography ==
Šćepanović was born in 1934 in the Bijelo Polje settlement Livadice. He graduated from the University of Belgrade Faculty of Philosophy. He worked in the Cultural and Educational Council of the SFR Yugoslavia.

Together with the poet Lazar Vučković, he drowned in Lake Ohrid, during his stay at the Struga Poetry Evenings, one of the most important cultural events in the former Yugoslavia. Another poet, Oskar Davičo, was with them and also fell into the water when the boat capsized but survived because he knew how to swim while Vučković and Šćepanović did not.

Although Šćepanović died at the very beginning of his poetry career, he managed to leave behind several collections of poetry.

== Works ==
Books

- Lobanja u travi (1957)
- Ivicom zemlje zmija (1958)
- Smrću protiv smrti (1959) – together with Branko Miljković
- Smrt pjesnikova (1961)
- Zlatna šuma (1966)
- Ljubavlju izmjereno vrijeme (1973) – published posthumously
- Pjesnikov dvojnik (1976) – published posthumously
