= Mafekhabl =

Mafekhabl Мафэхабль Мафэхьабл
- Aul
- Location within Republic of Adygea Location within Russia
- Coordinates: 44°38′N 40°10′E
- Country: Russia
- Region: Adygea
- District: Maykopsky District
- Time zone: UTC+3:00

Mafekhabl (Russian: Мафэхабль; Adyghe: Мафэхьабл) is a rural locality (an aul) in Kirovskoye Rural Settlement of Maykopsky District, Russia. The population was 140 as of 2018. There are 7 streets. The village was founded after the Circassians of Kosovo emigrated to the Republic of Adyghea in the Russian Federation as refugees due to the war.
