= Esad Mekuli =

Albanian poet and scholar

- Born: December 17, 1916; Plav, Kingdom of Montenegro
- Died: August 6, 1993 (aged 76); Pristina, FR Yugoslavia
- Citizenship: Yugoslav
- Education: University of Belgrade
- Spouse: Sehadete Mekuli
- Writing career
- Pen name: Sat Nokshiqi; Sat Hoxha
- Language: Albanian

Esad Mekuli (Serbian Cyrillic: Есад Мекули; 17 December 1916 – 6 August 1993) was a Yugoslav(Albanian) poet, critic and translator. He was the first president of the Academy of Sciences and Arts of Kosovo. Robert Elsie considered him the father of modern Albanian poetry in Yugoslavia, and his influence in Kosovo remains immense.

== Biography ==
Esad Mekuli was born in Plav to Haxhi Hoxhë Smajl Ademi of the Mekuli brotherhood in Nokshiq (sk. Novšiće). After finishing the local primary school, Mekuli studied in Pejë, graduating in 1936. He then registered in the faculty of veterinary medicine at the University of Belgrade. There he came in contact with Marxist circles, and was a veteran of the Spanish Civil War; for his political activity he was arrested in 1940. He was released in April 1941 after the declaration of amnesty. He began working in Peć as a veterinarian and was arrested again by the Italian army in 1942 for being suspected of having connections with the resistance movement. After his release, he joined the partisan forces in 1943 and became the editor of illegal partisan newspaper "Lirija" (Freedom).

After World War II he continued to work as a veterinarian, as well as the editor of the only legal Albanian newspaper of Kosovo "Rilindja" (Rebirth). In 1949 he founded the literary magazine "Jeta e Re" (New Life) and remained its editor-in-chief until 1971. He also wrote and cooperated with many newspapers in Kosovo, Montenegro, Serbia and Croatia. He was the first head of the Kosovo Writers' Association and the first head of the Academy of Sciences and Arts of Kosovo. His works also include translations of Yugoslav literature into Albanian, such as that of Montenegrin poet Petar II Petrović-Njegoš, and Serbian translations of Albanian literature. His pen names include Sat Nokshiqi and Sat Hoxha. He died in Pristina on August 6, 1993.

Esad was married to Sehadete Mekuli, gynecologist, public figure, and inspiration for the character Teuta Shkreli in Ismail Kadare's 1985 novel Krushqit jane te ngrire (The Wedding Procession Turned to Ice).

== Works ==
- Për ty (For You) – Pristina, (1955)
- Dita e re (New Day) – Pristina, (1966)
- Avsha Ada (Avsha Ada) – (1971)
- Vjersha (Poems) – (1973)
- Brigjet (Shores) – (1981)
- Rini e kuqe (Red Youth) – Pristina, (1984)
- Në mes të dashurisë dhe urrejtjes (Between love and hate) – Tiranë, (1986)
- Dita që nuk shuhet (The day which doesn't extinguish) – Pristina, (1989)
