= Vukašin Filipović =

Serbian writer, painter and professor (1930–1990)

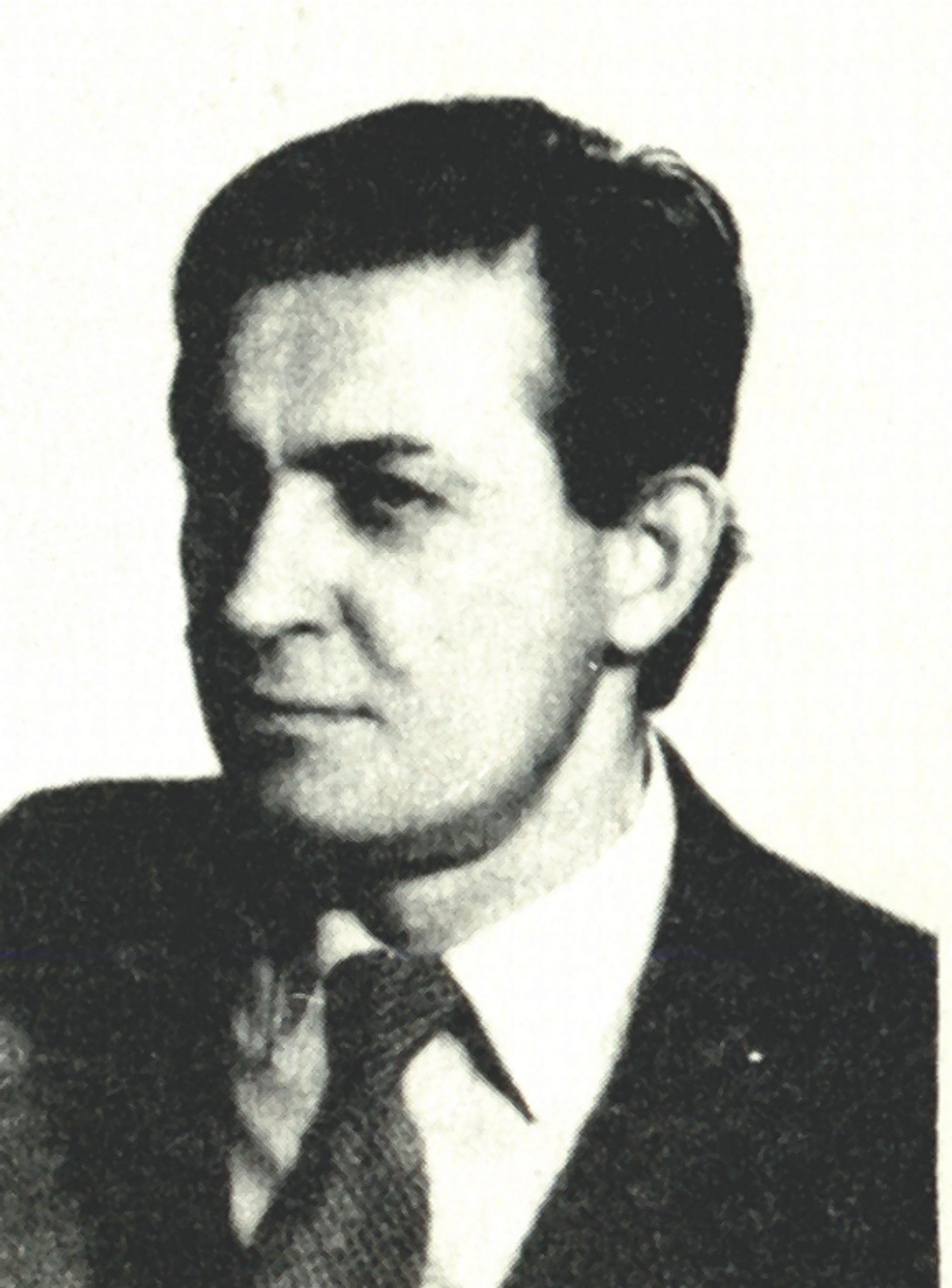

Vukašin "Vuk" Filipović (Stanovc, near Vučitrn, Morava Banovina, Yugoslavia, 30 August 1930 – Priština, Kosovo, Serbia, Yugoslavia, 9 June 1990) was a Serbian writer, painter and professor at the University of Priština. He is considered one of the most important Serbian 20th-century writers.

== Biography ==
He attended primary school in Babin Most, Bresje and Priština, and high school in the Second Men's Gymnasium in Belgrade and Priština, and graduated in Serbian literature at the Faculty of Philosophy in Belgrade in 1954. He received his doctorate at the same faculty in 1964 on the topic "Childhood in the work of Bora Stanković". He was a professor at the "Ivo Lola Ribar" Gymnasium in Priština (1954–1959), a lecturer at the Higher Pedagogical School and, from September 1960 until his death, a lecturer and professor at the Faculty of Philosophy in Priština in the subjects of Literary Theory and Modern Serbian Literature of the 20 century.

He is one of the founders and the first editor-in-chief of the literary magazine Vidici (1953–1954) in Belgrade. He is the initiator and editor-in-chief of the magazine Stremljenja (1965–1979) in Priština. As a student in Belgrade, he published about thirty stories with topics from Kosovo life in Mladi Borac, Mlada Kultura, NIN, Naši odjeku, and the newspaper Jedinstvo. His novel Tragovima ("Traces" in manuscript) was awarded at the "National Education" competition in Sarajevo in 1957 for a Yugoslav novel. The Provincial National Theater in Priština performed his plays: "Dark Rooms" (Albanian Drama, 1956) and "Snow and Fire" (Serbian Drama, 1963). He organized two solo exhibitions of paintings in 1957 and 1960. His exhibition was the first solo exhibition of paintings in Kosovo and Metohija. He also illustrated the collection of poems by Rado Nikolić "Shadows", and published numerous art contributions in Jedinstvo. He encouraged and helped young creators in Kosmet to affirm themselves. He was one of the initiators of the publishing activity of the newspaper Jedinstvo in 1961, in which he later published all his books.

He was a member of the Academy of Sciences and Arts of Kosovo (ANUK) since its founding, and from 1986 to 1990 he was its president, in one term and president of the Council of Academies of Sciences and Arts of SFR Yugoslavia. He did not join Serbian, Montenegrin and Muslim writers and intellectuals in 1986 in protests against the Albanian irredentists.

== Works ==
=== Non-fiction ===
- U svetu književnog dela [In the World of Literature], 1966
- Detinjstvo u delu Bore Stankovića [Childhood in the work of Bora Stanković], 1968
- Pripovedač Ivo Ćipiko, Pisci i Vreme [Storyteller Ivo Ćipiko, Writers and Time], Priština, 1970
- Simboli epskog prostora [Symbols of Epic Space], 1972
- Poetika trajanja [Poetics of Duration], 1973
- Svet književnog dela [World of Literature], 1975
- Delo Ive Andrića [The work of Ivo Andrić], 1975
- Poezija i poetika Stevana Raičkovića [Poetry and poetics of Stevan Raičković], 1977
- Umetnost Veljka Petrovića [The Art of Veljko Petrović], 1980
- Pisci i vreme 2 [Writers and Time 2], 1982
- Ogledi i studije [Trials and Studies], 1985

=== Novels ===
- Tragovima (Traces), Narodna prosvjeta, Sarajevo, 1957; (Gjurmat, translated into Albanian by Vehap Shita, Rilindja, Priština, 1958)
- Steep Coast, Jedinstvo, Priština, 1961, (second edition: New World, Priština, 1996)

=== Performed dramas ===
- Dark Chambers (Albanian: Oda e erret), Provincial National Theater (Albanian Drama), Priština, directed by Slavoljub Stefanović Ravasi, 1956
- Pohod, radio drama, Radio Priština, 1962
- Snow and Fire, Provincial National Theater (Serbian Drama), Priština, directed by Aleksandar Kovačević, 1963; National Theater, Leskovac, 1964

=== Painting exhibition ===
- Watercolours, Foyers of the Provincial National Theater, Priština, 1957 and 1960

== Awards ==
- Award of the Association of Cultural and Artistic Societies of Kosovo and Metohija for the drama "Dark Rooms",
- Third Prize of the "National Education" in Sarajevo for the novel, 1956,
- Award of the Regional Secretariat for Education and Culture AKMO, 1958,
- December Award of Kosovo, 1964,
- November Award of Priština, 1966,
- Kosovo Writers' Association Award, 1976,
- 7 July Award of SR Serbia, 1982,
