= Darinka Jevrić =

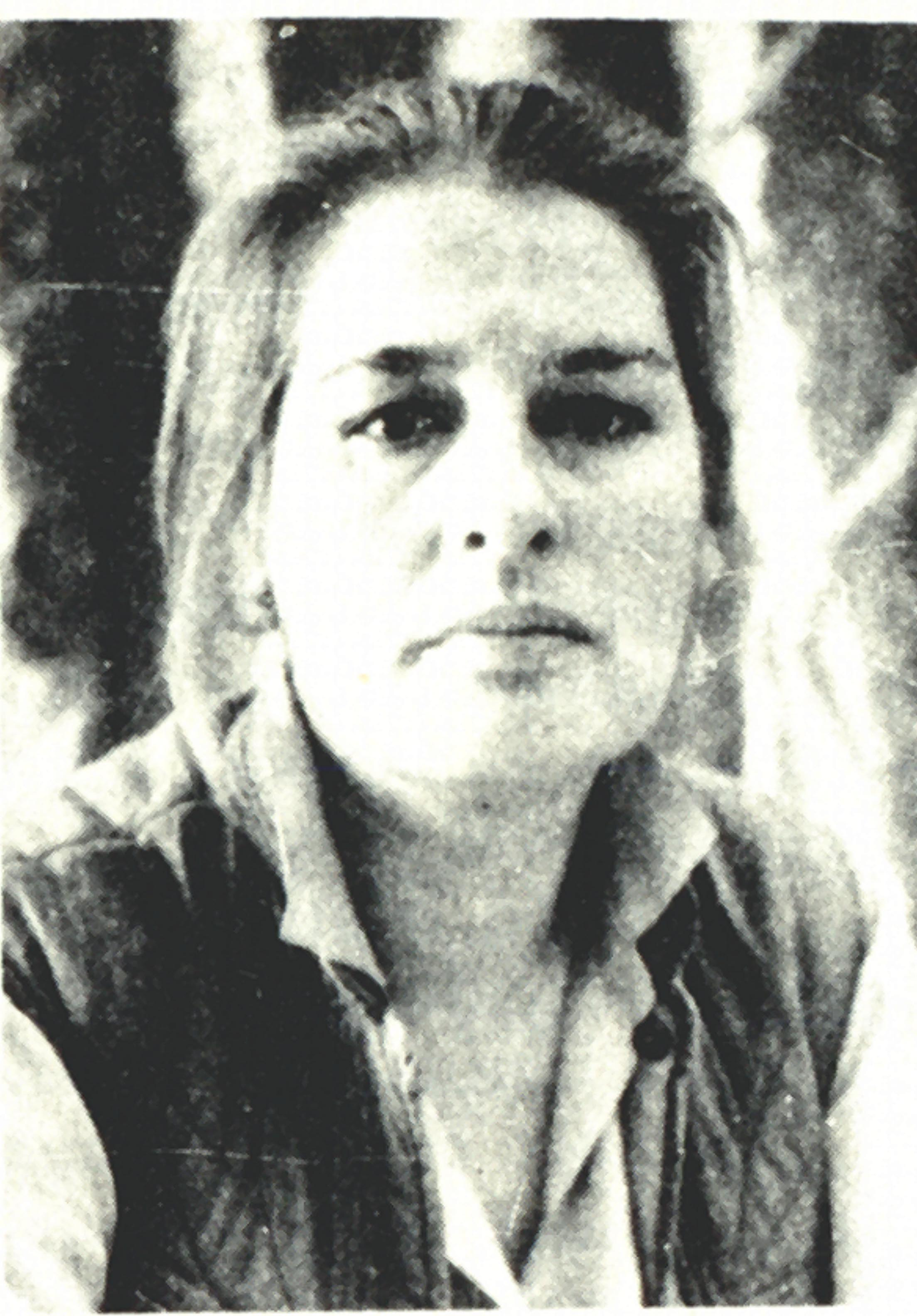
- Darinka Jevrić
- Born: 21 October 1947; Glođane, Peć, FPR Yugoslavia
- Died: 16 February 2007 (aged 59); Belgrade, Serbia
- Occupations: Poet, author
- Writing career
- Notable works: The Broken Silence (1973); Hvostanska zemlja (1990); Dečani bells and other poems (2004)

Darinka Jevrić (Serbian Cyrillic: Даринка Јеврић; 21 October 1947 – 16 February 2007) was a Kosovo Serb poet.

== Background ==
Jevrić was born in Glođane (Gllogjan) near Peć. She worked for 25 years as a cultural journalist and critic at the Pristina-based Jedinstvo newspaper.

Her first poems were included in an anthology in 1970. They were followed in her lifetime by eight books published between 1973 and 2006. Her most famous poem is "Dečanska Zvona" ("The Deçani Bells").

At the end of the Kosovo War in June 1999, Jevrić was one of the few Serb intellectuals who chose to stay in Kosovo. She lived in Pristina until the March 2004 anti-Serb riots. She died in Belgrade, aged 59.
